= Transport in Melilla =

Melilla is a Spanish autonomous city, located in the north coast of Africa. It has an airport, a port and roads.

== Air transport ==
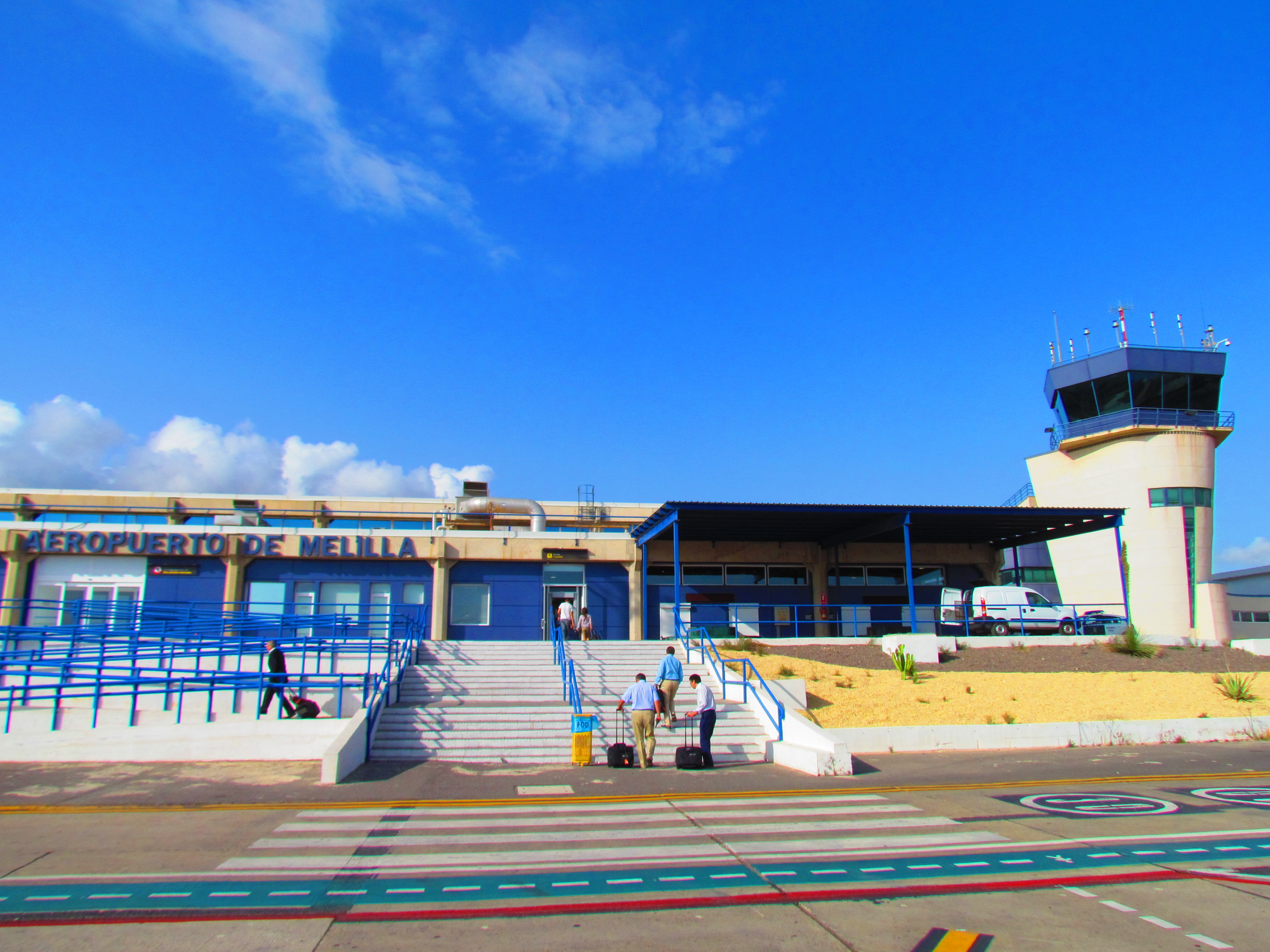
Melilla Airport terminal

In Melilla, there is a national airport, Melilla Airport (IATA: MLN, OACI: GEML), which has a paved runway and a terminal. It has flights to Madrid, Barcelona, Málaga, Gran Canaria and Palma de Mallorca.

Some airlines with Melilla Airport as their hub are: Melilla Airlines, Ryjet, Airmel or Pauknair.

== Maritime transport ==
There is a port, with ferry connection to Málaga, Almería and Motril.

== Roads ==
There are 28 kilometers of roads in Melilla. 27 of those kilometers are roads with a single lane per direction, and only one kilometer has multiple lanes. There are no freeways (in Spanish: autovía or autopista) in the whole autonomous city.

=== Crossing points ===
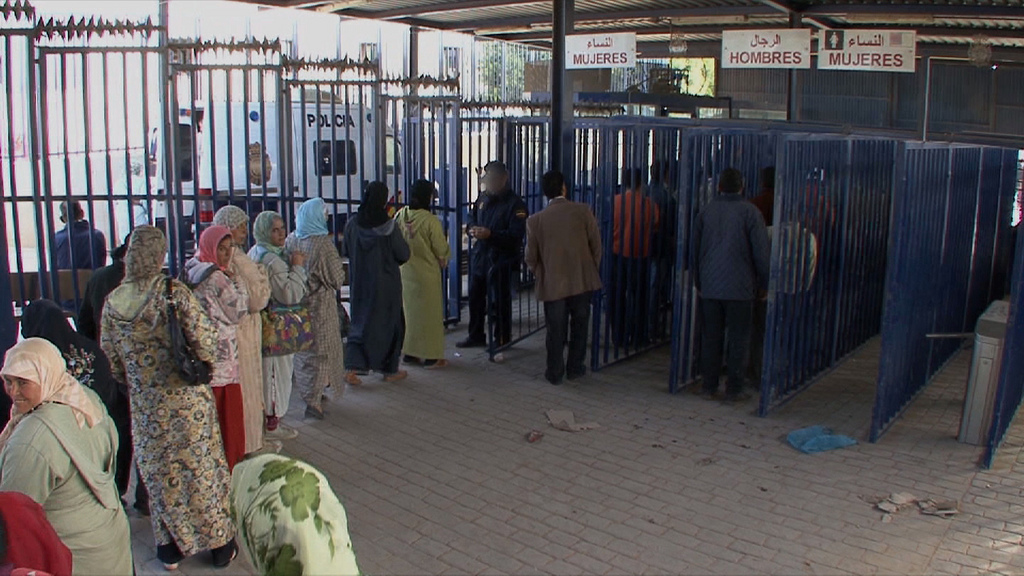
Border crossing between Melilla and Beni Ansar

There are 4 crossing points between Melilla and Morocco, being the most important one the Beni Ensar Crossing Point.

== Rail transport ==
There are no railways in Melilla.

== Bus ==
The city of Melilla has 6 bus lines:

- Line 1: Barrio Chino - García Cabrelles
- Line 2: Plaza España - Frontera Benienzar
- Line 3: Real - General Marina
- Line 5: Plaza Torres Quevedo - Cabrerizas
- Line 6: Plaza Torres Quevedo - Mariguari
- Line 7: García Cabrelles - Farhana
