= LagunAir =

Spanish airline

IATA	ICAO	Call sign
N7	LGA	LAGUNAIR
- Founded: September 29, 2003
- Ceased operations: 2008
- Hubs: León Airport
- Focus cities: Salamanca Airport, Valladolid Airport
- Fleet size: 4
- Destinations: 19
- Parent company: AGELCO Group
- Headquarters: León, Spain
- Key people: Ignacio Tejera Montaño (CEO)

LagunAir Líneas Aéreas, usually referred to simply as LagunAir, was an airline based in León, Spain. It operated scheduled domestic passenger services to 19 destinations on the Spanish mainland, and to Menorca, Mallorca, and Ibiza. Its main base was León Airport and it maintained focus city operations at Valladolid Airport and Salamanca Airport.

== History ==
Initially owned by the León Airport Consortium the company began to operate on September 29, 2003 with a flight from León to Barcelona's El Prat airport. LagunAir stopped operating on 31 January 2005, allegedly due to excessive technical difficulties in operating from León Airport and the mismanagement of the latter by Aena. In February 2005 it was bought and relaunched by AGELCO Group, acronym for Agrupación de Empresarios Leoneses de la Construcción, a local Leonese investor group. The company and the investors received extensive local government support. The company resumed operations on 1 March 2005.

The new ownership re-oriented the firm and set up a long-term strategy aimed at becoming the leading regional airline in Castilla and León. Electronic ticketing was introduced in May 2005, and the company reached several agreements with major Spanish tour operators. The strategic expansion plan included increasing the company's capital to 14 million euros, in order to renew the current SAAB turboprop fleet with longer-range Embraer jet aircraft, and setting up focus city operations at the other major Castilla and León airports, beginning with Valladolid Airport and Salamanca Airport.

On October 9, 2008, the company announced on its website that it had ceased flight operations and tickets sales until further notice. All pending bookings were transferred to Air Nostrum

== Destinations ==
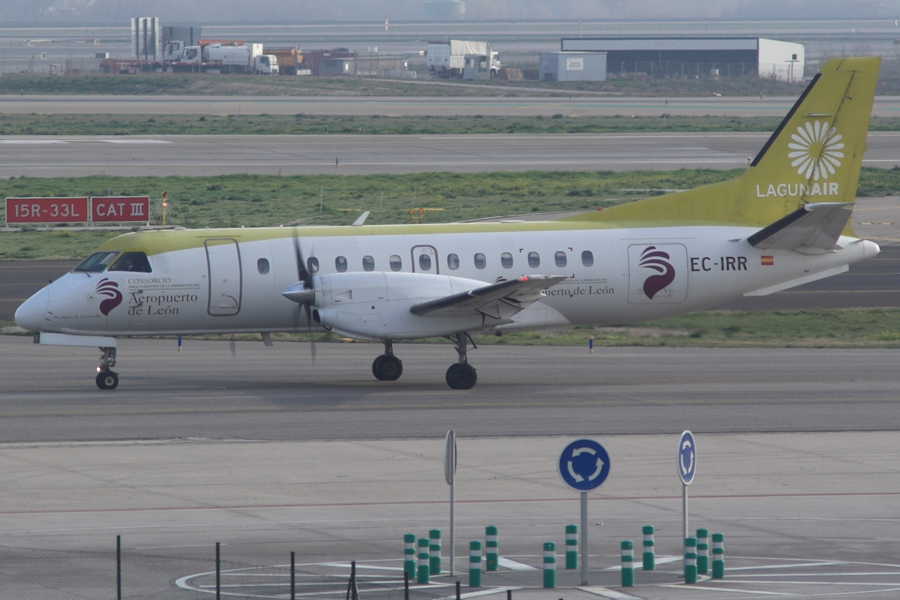
LagunAir Saab 340

- Barcelona (Barcelona El Prat)
- Ibiza (Ibiza Airport)
- Jerez de la Frontera (Jerez Airport)
- León (León Airport)
- Menorca (Menorca Airport)
- Palma de Mallorca (Son Sant Joan Airport)
- Salamanca (Salamanca Airport)
- Valencia (Valencia Airport)
- Valladolid (Valladolid Airport)

== Fleet ==
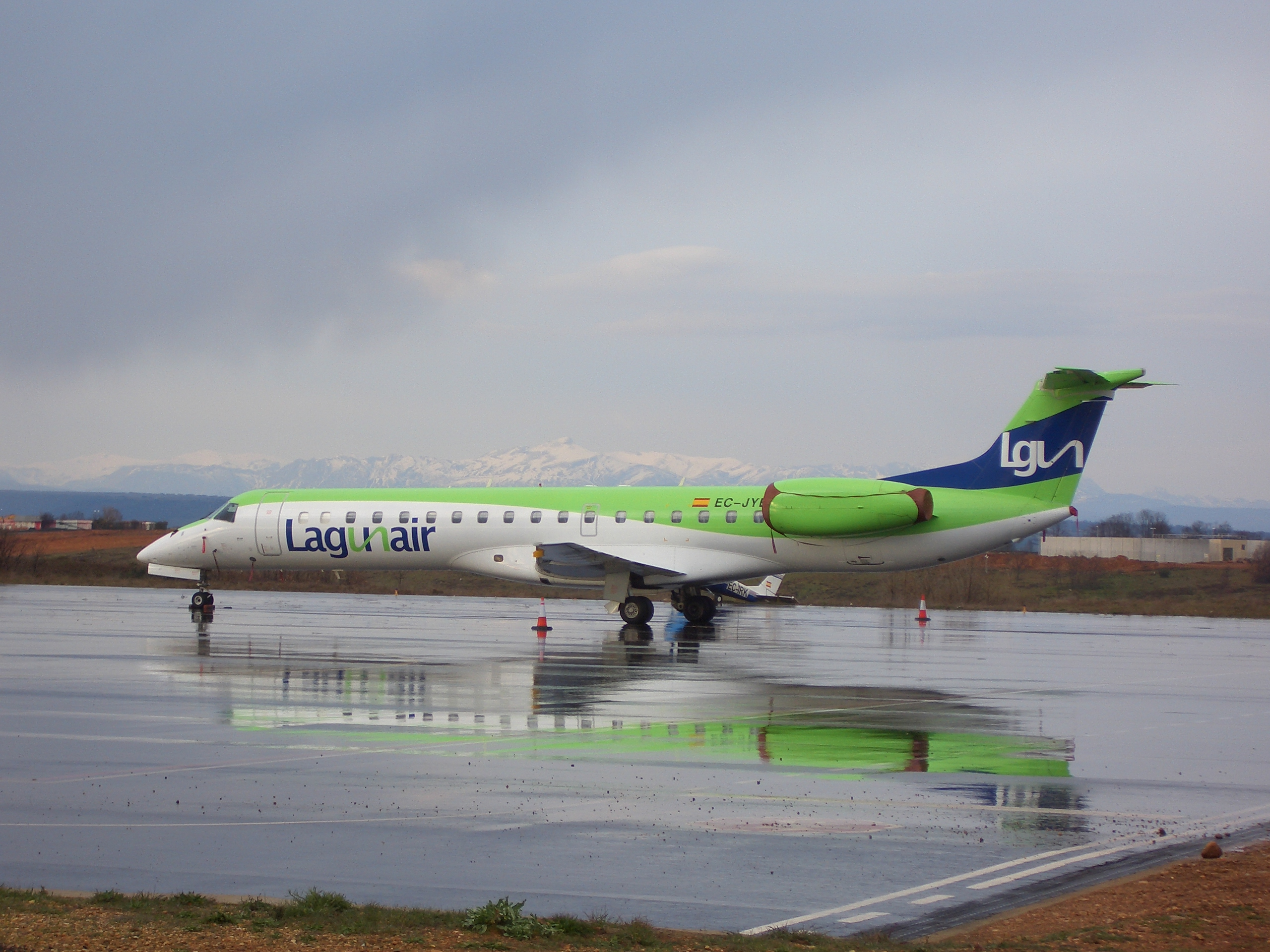
Embraer ERJ 145

The LagunAir fleet consisted of the following aircraft (as of 21 September 2008) :

- 3 Embraer ERJ 145
- 1 Saab 340A

== See also ==
- List of defunct airlines of Spain
