= La Cerdanya Aerodrome =

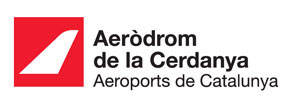
- IATA: none; ICAO: LECD

Summary
- Airport type: public
- Owner: Generalitat de Catalunya; La Cerdanya County Council
- Operator: Aeroports de Catalunya; Gestió Aeroportuària Ceretana, SL
- Serves: Puigcerdà
- Location: Alp
- Elevation AMSL: 3,609 ft / 1,110 m
- Coordinates: 42°23′18″N 1°52′00″E
- Interactive map of La Cerdanya Aerodrome

Runways
| Direction | Length | | Surface |
| Direction | ft | m | Surface |
|---|---|---|---|
| 07/25 | 4,101 | 1,250 | Asphalt |

La Cerdanya Aerodrome (Catalan: Aeròdrom de la Cerdanya) is an airfield located in the Catalan town of Alp, in the Cerdanya county. It was founded in 1971 with the establishment of the now-disappeared Aero Club de la Cerdanya.

The Aerdrome grew because of the gliding activity of the Centre de Vol a Vela La Cerdanya, which later became a section of the Aero Club Barcelona-Sabadell.

Integrated into the Catalan Government's new airports plan, the airfield management, which belongs to Aeroports de Catalunya and the Cerdanya County Council, was put up for public tender in 2008, which was won by Gestió Aeronàutica Ceretana, S.L. consortium, composed by Aero Club Barcelona-Sabadell, CAT Helicòpters, Masella, and La Molina.

== See also ==
- Lleida–Alguaire Airport
- Andorra–La Seu d'Urgell Airport
