= León Airport =

León Airport Aeropuerto de León

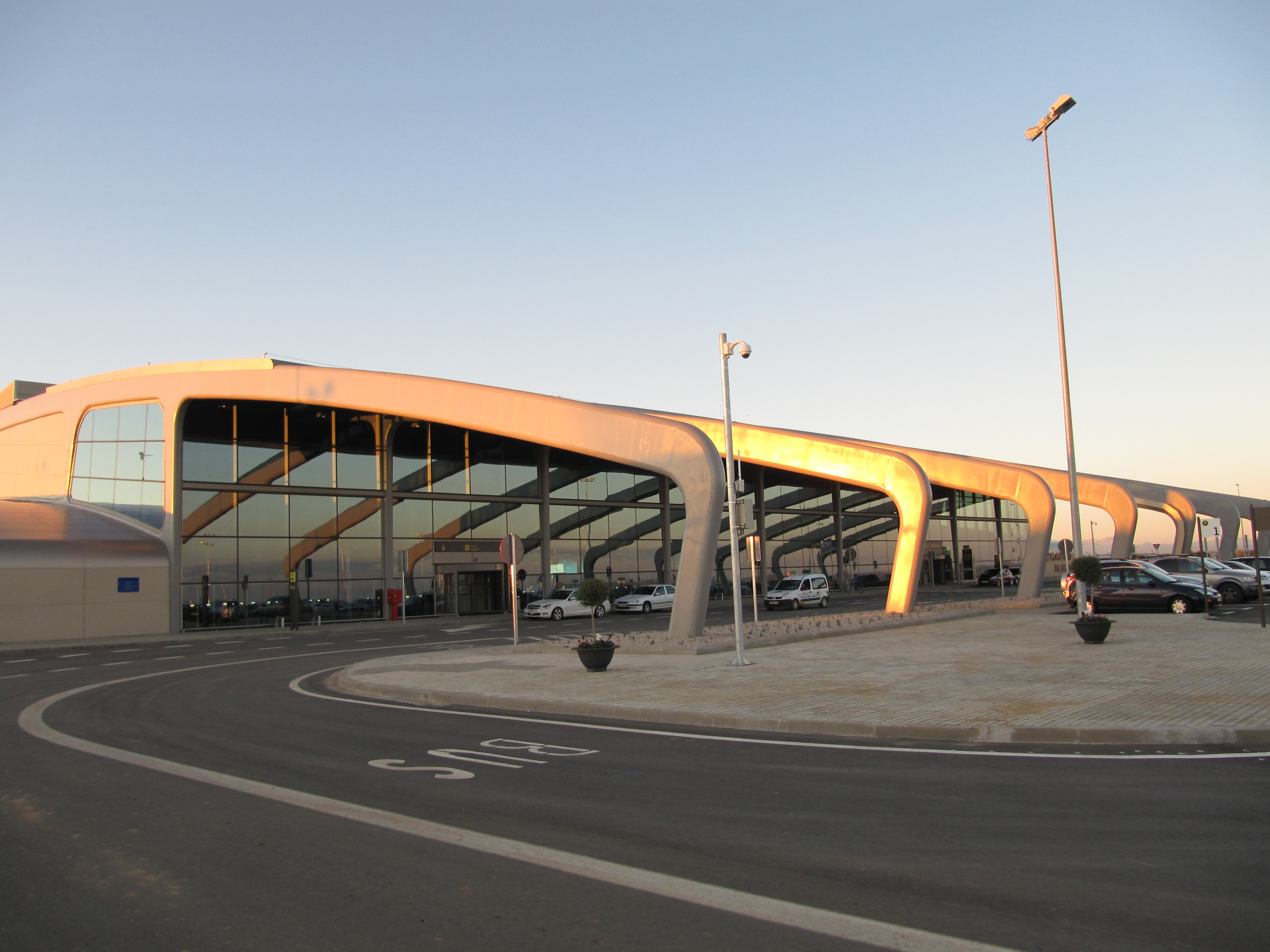
- IATA: LEN; ICAO: LELN

Summary
- Airport type: Public
- Owner/Operator: AENA
- Serves: León, Castile and León, Spain
- Location: San Andrés del Rabanedo and Valverde de la Virgen
- Built: 1924
- Elevation AMSL: 3,005 ft (916 m)
- Coordinates: 42°35′20″N 5°39′20″W
- Website: aena-aeropuertos.es

Map
- Location of airport in Spain

Runways
Direction	Length		Surface
Direction	m	ft	Surface
05/23	3,000	9,843	Asphalt
06/24	1,100	3,609	Natural ground compact

Statistics (2025)
- Passengers: 74,143
- Passenger change 24-25: ▲19.4%
- Movements: 3,767
- Movements change 24-25: ▲15.3%
- Sources: https://www.aena.es/es/estadisticas/inicio.html

León Airport, Spanish: Aeropuerto de León or Aeropuertu de Llión in Leonese language (IATA: LEN, ICAO: LELN), is a minor domestic airport located 6 kilometres (4 mi) from León, Castile and León, Spain. It is one of the oldest military air bases in Spain, and the airport with the highest elevation of the Iberian Peninsula.

== History ==
=== Foundation and early years ===
In March 1920, a ministerial provision on territorial distribution and organisation of military forces and services designated León as a location for one of the air stations established under the provision. In 1924, works were approved to adapt the air station so that León airport could be used for stopovers by aircraft on the route that linked Madrid and Asturias. In 1929, the military aerodrome was provisionally authorised to provide commercial air navigation services.

The aerodrome was located one kilometre north of the village of Virgen del Camino and seven kilometres south of the city of León. An area of hard flat land was dedicated to pasture, and its navigation aids comprised a marking in the middle of the airfield and a windsock. It had four hangars to house and repair aircraft, as well as fuel, oil, water and telephone services. At that time the station was the headquarters of Number One Squadron's 21st Inspection Unit, within the Northwest Regional Fleet.

During the Spanish Civil War, the León aerodrome was the headquarters of numerous airborne units and at the end of the conflict it was listed as class A. At that time it had radio and telephone facilities, a radiogoniometer and night lighting.

In the 1940s, an aviation school was installed in the facilities, where the first pilots graduated at the General Aviation School. When this was closed it was replaced by the Apprentices School and later by the Airforce Specialists School.

=== Start of commercial flights ===
In 1964, León Airport was opened to commercial traffic. It now had an airfield with facilities for landing in two directions. The aeronautical limitations were published in 1967 and remained unmodified until 1988. In 1990, the local and regional governments decided to sponsor an airport infrastructure project that would encourage aeronautical activity in the province. For this purpose, Leon's Provincial Council requested authorisation from the Spanish Ministry of Defence to install civil facilities on the land of the military air station, with permission being granted in 1991.

In 1994, the first stage of León's civil airport project was drawn up and a runway, a link road and an aircraft parking area were built and inaugurated in 1995. The plans for the second stage of the project were drawn up in 1997 and a terminal and service building were built, the works finishing in January 1999. On 2 June 1999, León's civil airport was officially inaugurated, following which Iberia established scheduled flights to Madrid and Barcelona.

=== Developments since 2000 ===
In 2003, a new Rescue and Fire Fighting Services Building was built, with its corresponding developed and landscaped area, as well as a technical block and an elevated water tank. In October 2005, the runway and aircraft parking apron extensions were put into service and an instrument landing system (ILS CAT I) was installed. Initially owned by the León Airport Consortium, the airline LagunAir began operating on September 29, 2003 with León as its hub airport.

On 22 December 2007, the then Prime Minister of Spain, José Luis Rodríguez Zapatero, presented the third expansion of the airport. This consisted of the construction of a new 9,600 m^{2} terminal divided into two floors, the development of a new 30,250 m^{2} apron area and a new parking lot with capacity for 275 cars and 8 buses. These works duplicated the current capacity of the airport, and allow wide-body aircraft to land, extending the flight range to 4000 nautical miles, making routes to the US, Middle East and Africa possible. On 13 January 2008, the Ministry of the Environment decided that an Environmental Impact Statement was unnecessary, thus allowing the immediate approval of the project. Finally, the works of the new terminal concluded during the month of September 2010, inaugurated by the Ministry of Public Works on October 11, 2010.

Nowadays, the airport has a passenger capacity of 600,000 passengers annually, and has the facilities that potentially allow it to operate national and international flights. Since 2017, an effort to boost traffic in LEN has been made, and traffic has started to grow. Charter flights and travel agency tours have provided León with international flights for a long time now, but in 2019, Air Nostrum announced it is researching the possibility of opening routes to London, Paris, Rome or Frankfurt due to the growing demand the year of 2018. In 2018, the airport handled 55,946 passengers. 3,145 passengers in June, a 245,2% increase compared to June 2017.

For 2022, a 16% increase in seats offered is planned compared to 2021. During 2023, weekly Ski Charter flights were added from Oporto and flights to Palma de Mallorca Airport were extended to year round.

== Airlines and destinations ==
The following airlines operate regular scheduled and charter flights at León Airport:

Airlines	Destinations
Iberia	Barcelona; Seasonal: Ibiza, Gran Canaria, Málaga, Menorca, Palma de Mallorca

== Statistics ==
=== Busiest routes ===
Busiest domestic routes from LEN (2025)
Rank	Destination	Passengers	Change 2024 / 25
1	Barcelona	27,980	▼0.6%
2	Palma de Mallorca	19,150	▲16.3%
3	Gran Canaria	4,135	▲7.1%
5	Ibiza	2,794	▲76.2%
4	Málaga	1,660	▲35.1%
Source: Estadísticas de tráfico aereo
