= Air Andorra =

Spanish regional airline

- Founded: 2015
- Hubs: La Seu d'Urgell Airport
- Fleet size: 1
- Headquarters: Barcelona, Spain

Air Andorra was a Spanish regional airline start-up based out of La Seu d'Urgell Airport near Andorra that never started operations.

== History ==
Air Andorra had been formed by aviation industry members with the intention to be based in La Seu d'Urgell Airport, Spain, and to serve Andorra from there, as there are no airports within Andorra. As of 2021, the airline founded in 2015 never actually started any operations. Its sole direct competitor would have been Andorra Airlines.
