= Andorra Airlines =

Spanish virtual airline

- Founded: 2015
- Focus cities: Andorra–La Seu d'Urgell
- Headquarters: Barcelona, Spain
- Key people: Jorge Soriano, Chairman & CEO
- Website: www.andorraairlines.com

Andorra Airlines is a Spanish virtual regional airline headquartered in Barcelona and based at Andorra–La Seu d'Urgell Airport, serving the microstate of Andorra.

== History ==
The airline was founded in 2015 by businessman Jorge Soriano and two partners. They had plans to start operations by 2016 from Andorra–La Seu d'Urgell Airport, which opened in 2010 and it is geographically located in Catalonia. The aim was to connect Andorra, an independent principality under the protection of France and Spain, with major Spanish and European destinations because the tiny nation totally lacked scheduled flights. This was delayed by several years due to the bankruptcy of the investment fund in charge of funding of the company.

== Destinations ==
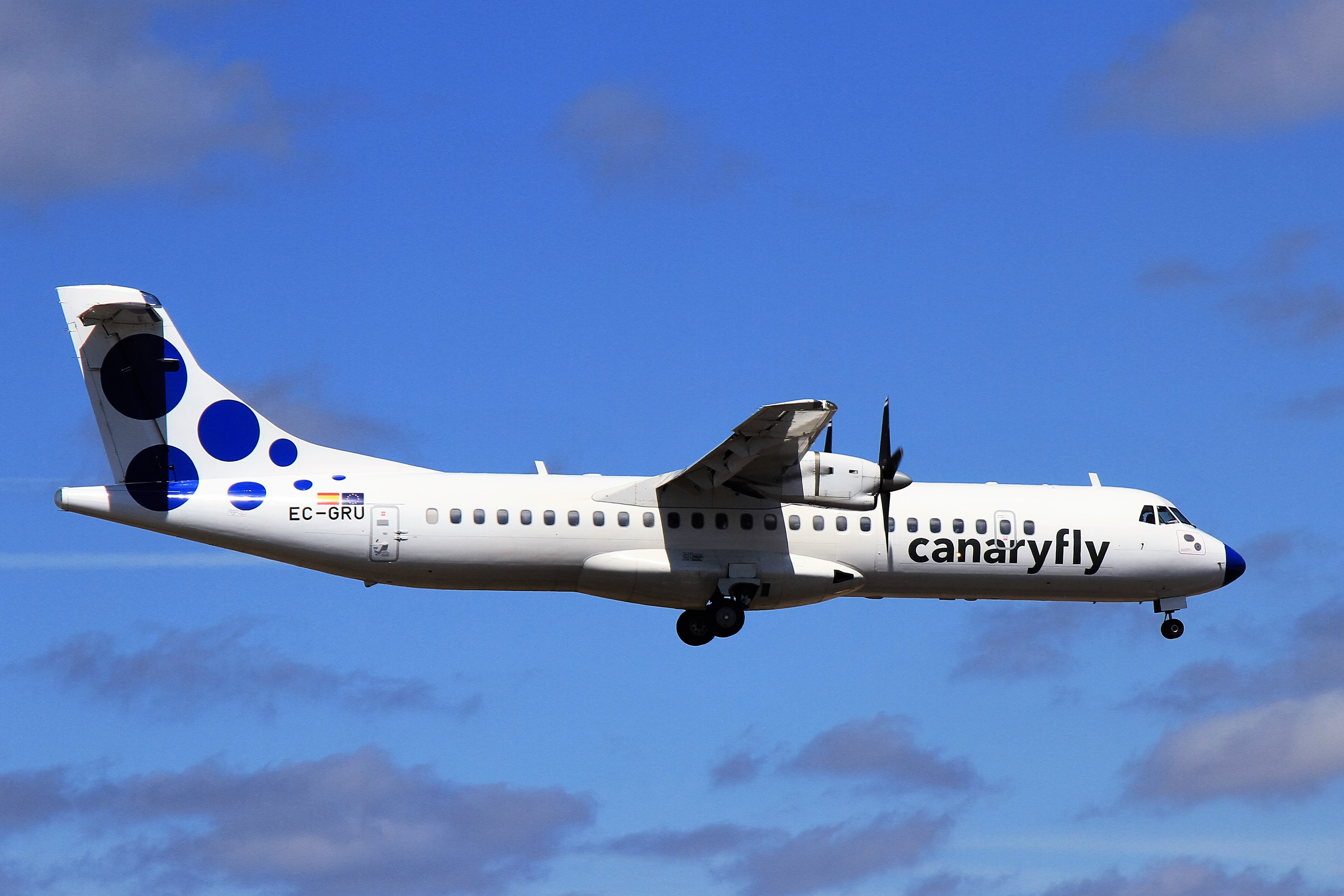
Canaryfly ATR72 operated the first flight for Andorra Airlines in April 2021.

Andorra has been called the 'largest country without an airport' as it is served from the Andorra–La Seu d'Urgell Airport, which is geographically located in nearby autonomous community of Catalonia (Spain).

In 2020, the company announced plans to inaugurate flights to Madrid and Palma de Mallorca using ATR turboprops. In February 2021, a Canaryfly ATR 72 with Andorra Airlines stickers arrived at La Seu Airport. At the time, the company planned to have the aircraft based there for a few months. On 20 April 2021, the company operated the first charter flight. As of July 2021, Andorra Airlines had plans to operate flights from La Seu airport to Madrid, Palma de Mallorca and Porto.

A pilot scheme by Andorra Airlines competitor Air Nostrum, to operate year-round flights to Palma de Mallorca was trialled in 2023, and the success of the scheme, with 70% occupancy on planes, led that company to announce plans to operate the route year round from 2026.

== Fleet ==
Andorra Airlines lacks an AOC and doesn't operate any aircraft. During 2021, it marketed flights operated by Canaryfly using an ATR 72.
