= Tadair =

Spanish airline

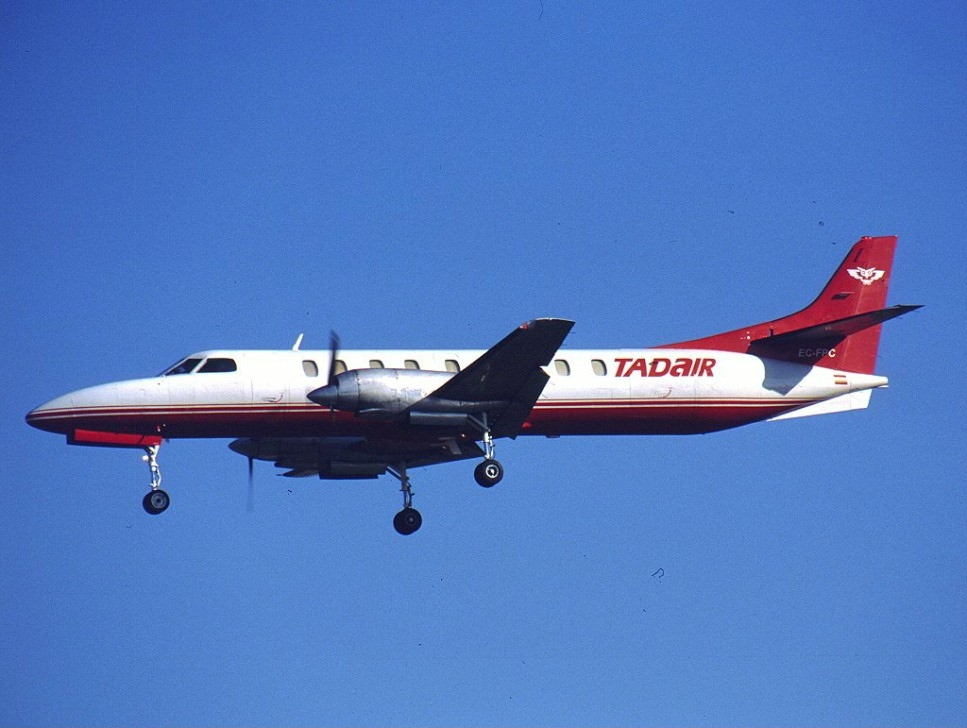
- Tadair Fairchild Swearingen Metroliner
IATA	ICAO	Call sign
-	TDC	Tadair
- Founded: 1990
- Ceased operations: 2003
- Focus cities: Sabadell, Spain
- Headquarters: Barcelona
- Key people: Paco Irigoyen

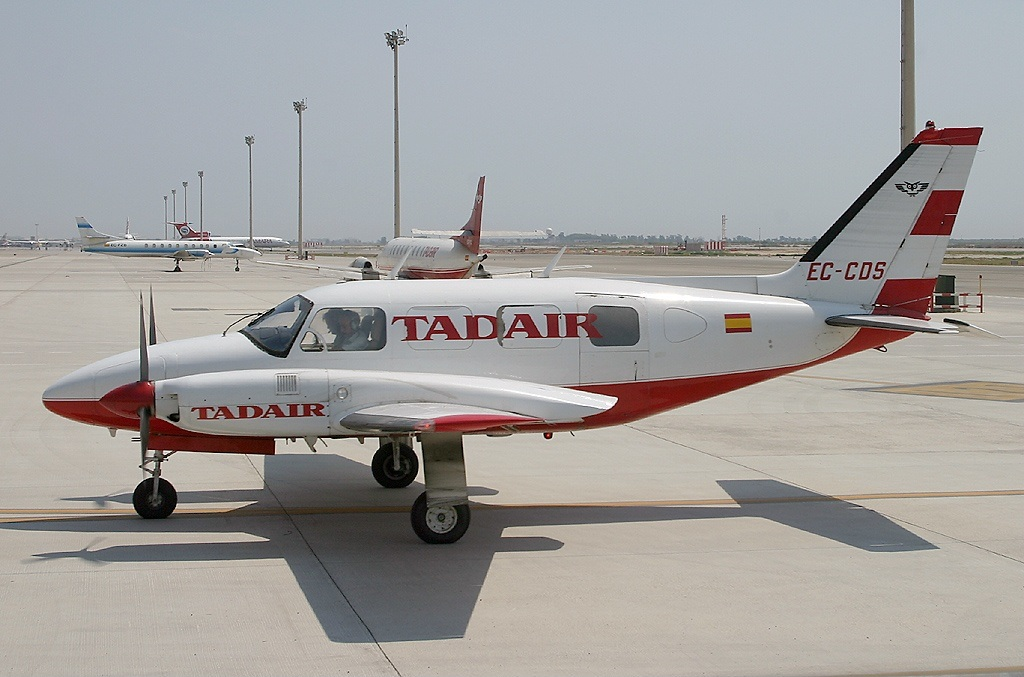
Tadair Piper PA-31-310 Navajo B

Tadair was an airline based in Barcelona, Catalonia, Spain.

== History ==
Tadair was established in 1990 and operated general aviation aircraft associated with its flying school as well as regional charter services.

The company had a number of fatal accidents during its history. On 12 April 2002 there was an accident at Palma de Mallorca Airport involving Tadair's Fairchild Metro II that resulted in two casualties.

Tadair filed for bankruptcy in 2003. At the moment of ceasing operations it had only one Fairchild Metro II aircraft. Following the bankruptcy of the company numerous lawsuits were filed by creditors against the successor company Speed Fly SL.

== Fleet ==
The Tadair fleet consisted of 19 aircraft in 1998.

- 10 Fairchild Metro II
- 9 Piper PA-31 Navajo
