= Tauima Aerodrome =

Tauima Aerodrome Aeródromo de Tauima
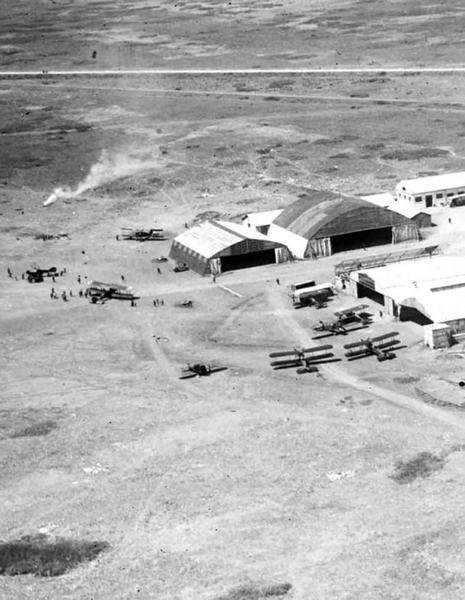
- IATA: none; ICAO: none

Summary
- Airport type: Public
- Owner/Operator: Spanish Army
- Serves: Melilla
- Location: Tauima, Morocco
- Opened: 1931
- Built: 27 July 1931. (94 years)
- Elevation AMSL: 0 m / 0 ft
- Coordinates: 35°16′47″N 02°57′23″W

Map

Runways
| Direction | Length | | Surface |
| Direction | m | ft | Surface |
|---|---|---|---|
| 08-26 | 1,400 | 4,701 | Asphalt |

The Tauima aerodrome was a Spanish military installation that existed in the town of Tauima, in the former Spanish protectorate of Morocco. Said aerodrome, which was located in the vicinity of Melilla, served as a base for the planes of the Spanish Military Aeronautics.

== History ==
In 1921 Moroccan troops seized the territories near Melilla, including the Zeluán aerodrome, so military aviation had to look for a new place. The chosen place is located in the area of Cabrerizas Altas, to the north of the City of Melilla; the aerodrome is a narrow field of only 300 m on its longest side. Recovered by the Spanish army and the land occupied, the aerodrome was moved from the equestrian area where it had been permanently established, to an 8 km^{2} plain to the south of Nador, next to the town of Tauima.

The facilities are limited to a few detachable hangars and field workshops, surrounded by a protective wall. At the same time, the Atalayón Seaplane Base was installed in the bay of Mar Chica. These two aeronautical facilities played a very important role in the Alhucemas landing, in September 1925.

Once the war was over, the aerodrome facilities were improved, replacing the wooden control tower in the mid-1930s with another made of masonry. Tauima Aerodrome is officially opened to civilian traffic by a dahir, decree of the Sultan, on 27 July 1931.

At the beginning of the civil war, the rebel troops occupied the airfield on 17 July. Subsequently, several lines were inaugurated, both from Tauima Aerodrome, and from the Atalayón seaplane base: Rome-Palma de Mallorca-Melilla-Cádiz, Melilla-Seville, Melilla-Tétouan and Melilla-Málaga-Seville-Lisbon, all served by the Italian company Ala Littoria. The entry of Italy in the World War II, brings the suppression of the lines of Ala Littoria which is replaced by TAE (Spanish Air Traffic) with route 558 carried out Madrid-Málaga-Tétouan-Melilla and this in turn, in December 1940, was replaced by Iberia that maintained the line Seville-Málaga-Melilla.

In the mid-1940s, runway 08-26 was built, which is 1,400 m long and occupies all the available space. In July 1946, Tauima Aerodrome is declared customs and is open to national and international traffic. It was at that time, faced with international agreements and pressure, that Spain began to accommodate charter and irregular flights. In this context, CANA (Auxiliary Air Navigation Company) appeared, carrying out Tétouan-Melilla-Málaga-Granada. In 1955 the construction of the control tower for the transmitter center was awarded, but the decolonization process of the kingdom of Morocco in 1956 forced the Spanish government to gradually withdraw the troops and Airlines.

Morocco at the end of 1957, called a conference to negotiate an air agreement with Spain. The meetings were held from 2 to 11 December in Madrid, within the framework of tense relations between the two countries, motivated by events in Sidi Ifni, which were going to prevent the negotiations from prospering.

In February, the Moroccan government unilaterally announced its intention for Royal Air Maroc to start flights between Tétouan and Nador on a provisional basis, using Tauima Aerodrome, as long as the air agreement with Spain is not signed. On 10 March 1958 the negotiations broke down and immediately afterwards the neighboring country prohibited the lines Tétouan-Melilla (Tauima) and Melilla (Tauima)-Málaga of the company Iberia. The Spanish government adopted the same measure against all those from Royal Air Maroc to Spain, while closing the airports of Tétouan and Melilla, still controlled, to civilian traffic by the Spanish army.

When talks resumed, the Moroccan government accepted Spain's proposal that Spanish cabotage flights heading from the peninsula to Melilla (Tauima) be considered. Thus, once Tauima Aerodrome is handed over to the Alaouite authorities, goods and passengers bound for Melilla -with transit treatment- will not be subject to Moroccan customs and border controls. to be able To carry out this transit, transportation to and from the city of Melilla would be carried out with vehicles specially "sealed" by the authorities of the two countries. Morocco did not look favorably on this situation because it feared that Spain tried to get similar privileges with respect to Tétouan Airport and the city of Ceuta.

In 1958, Tauima Aerodrome was still included in the investment plan for Spanish airports.

Meanwhile, and after multiple studies, the Ministry of Finance would allocate 184 million for the construction of the new Melilla airport, but unfortunately, an agreement by the Council of Ministers assigned it to urgent military purposes, leaving its construction formally suspended.

The alternative solution was to propose again a heliport in the equestrian area or in the Malla area or, failing that, build a runway barely 400 m long for landing and short takeoff aircraft, STOL.

This situation was maintained until 1967, when the construction of an airport in the City of Melilla was included in the II economic and social development plan. The chosen plots of land, practically the only ones available, are parcels to the southwest of the city, close to the old Yasinem highway. The works are awarded in October 1967; The electrical radio installation was carried out in December 1968 and upon completion on 24 July 1969, the order by which the airport of the City of Melilla was open to civil, national and international passenger traffic.

Inauguration of Melilla Airport

Melilla Airport was inaugurated on 31 July 1969 by the Air Minister, José Lacalle Larraga, to definitively replace Tauima Aerodrome, a town located in the former Spanish protectorate in Morocco.

== Airlines and destinations ==
| Year | Airline | Destination | Aircraft |
|---|---|---|---|
| 1931 | Ala Littoria | Málaga Seville Cádiz Palma de Mallorca Rome Lisbon Tétouan | Planes Junkers G 24 Junkers F 13 Savoia-Marchetti S.M.73 Fokker F.VIIb/3m Seaplanes Dornier C J Wal C R Superwal Savoia-Marchetti S.55 Savoia-Marchetti S.66 |
| 1940 | TAE (Spanish Air Traffic) | Málaga Madrid Tétouan | Douglas DC-1 Douglas DC-7 |
| 1941 | Iberia | Málaga Seville Tangier Tétouan | Douglas DC-1 Junkers Ju 52 |
| 1946 | CANA (Auxiliary Air Navigation Company) | Málaga Granada Tétouan | Miles Aerovan Lockheed 18 Lodestar |
| 1959 | Spantax | Málaga | Douglas DC-3 |

== Sources ==
- Cabello Alcaraz, J. (1951). Apuntes de geografía de Marruecos [Notes of the Geography of Morocco]. Editora Marroquí.
- Casanova, Julián; Espinosa, Francisco; Mir, Conxita; Moreno Gómez, Francisco (2004). Morir, matar, sobrevivir. La violencia en la dictadura de Franco [Die, kill, survive. Violence during the Franco dictatorship]. Barcelona: Ed. Crítica.
- Gil Honduvilla, Joaquín (2007). Justicia en guerra. Bando de guerra y jurisdicción militar en el bajo Guadalquivir [Justice in war. Band of war and military jurisdiction in the lower Guadalquivir]. Seville City Council, Board of Trustees of the Real Alcázar.
- González Álvarez, Manuel (2006). Aspectos militares de la Guerra Civil. La actuación en España de la Legión Cóndor [Military aspects of the Civil War. The performance of the Condor Legion in Spain]. Universidad de León.
- Hidalgo Salazar, Ramón (1975). La ayuda alemana en España. 1936–1939 [German aid in Spain. 1936–1939]. Madrid: Editorial San Martín.
- Preston, Paul (2013) [2011]. El Holocausto Español. Odio y Exterminio en la Guerra Civil y después [The Spanish Holocaust. Hate and Extermination in the Civil War and Afterwards]. Barcelona: Debolsillo.
