= PauknAir Flight 4101 =

1998 aviation accident

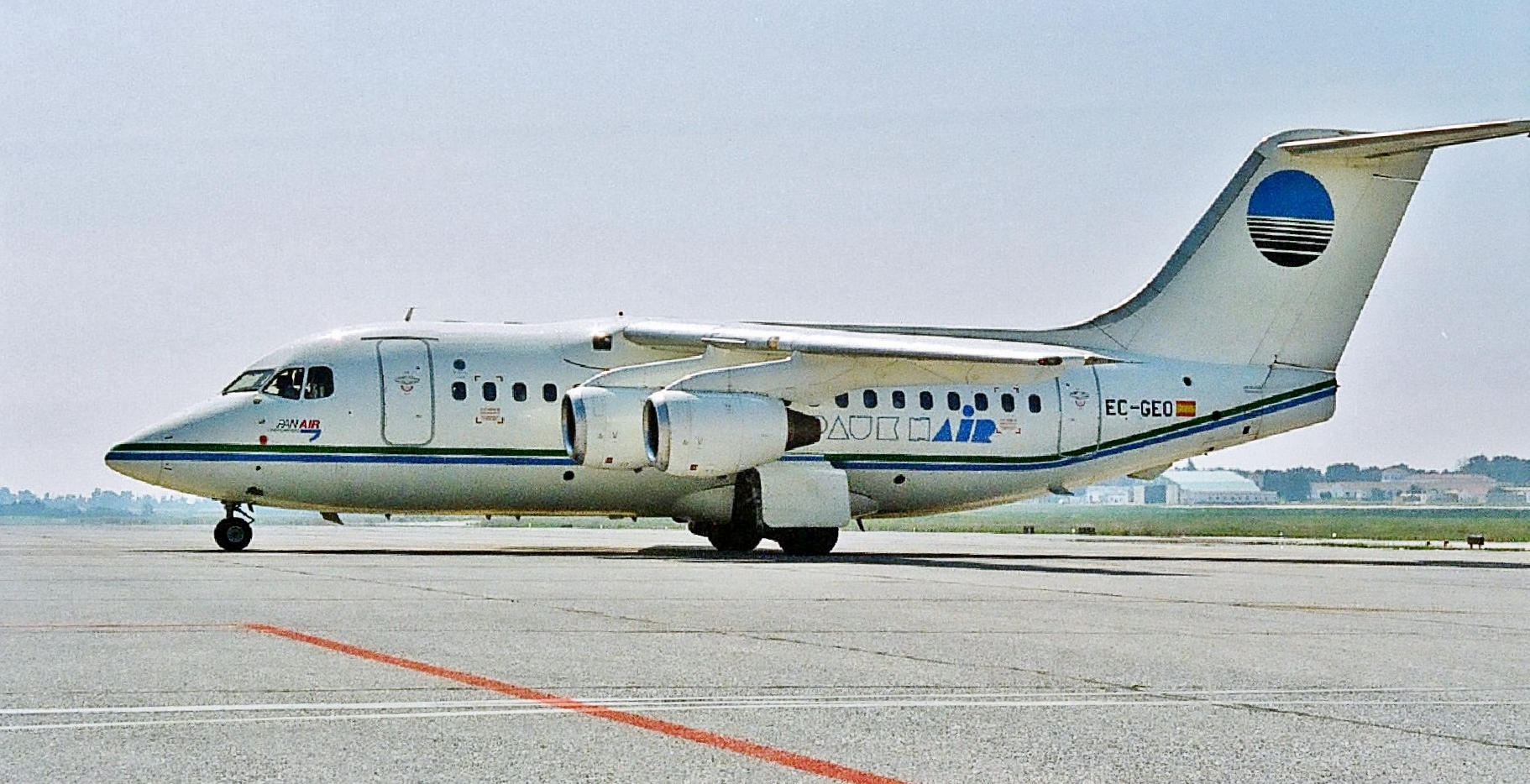
- The aircraft involved in the accident, April 1997 at Malaga Airport

Accident
- Date: 25 September 1998
- Summary: Controlled flight into terrain due to pilot error
- Site: Boumahfouda, Morocco; 35°24′53″N 002°58′29″W

Aircraft
- Aircraft type: British Aerospace 146
- Operator: PauknAir
- ICAO flight No.: PNR4101
- Registration: EC-GEO
- Flight origin: Málaga Airport
- Destination: Melilla Airport
- Occupants: 38
- Passengers: 34
- Crew: 4
- Fatalities: 38
- Survivors: 0

PauknAir Flight 4101 was a British Aerospace 146 that crashed on a flight from Málaga, Spain, to the Spanish North African exclave of Melilla on 25 September 1998. All 38 passengers and crew on board the aircraft were killed in the accident.

== The aircraft ==
The aircraft, a British Aerospace 146 series 100 (BAe 146-100), made its first flight in 1983 and was the seventh BAe 146 built and was originally delivered to British Airways and it was transferred to Dan-Air London a year later. After the aircraft spent several years in storage, PauknAir took over the aircraft when the airline commenced operations in September 1995.

== Accident ==
The aircraft took off from runway 14 at Malaga's Pablo Ruiz Picasso Airport at 8:23 AM Spanish time on 25 September 1998. On board were 34 passengers and a crew of four. The flight was under the command of 39-year old Captain Diego Clavero Muñoz and 28-year old First Officer Bartolomé Jiménez. The flight proceeded normally, without any problems and with fair weather conditions.

The descent began at 8:41 Melilian time (6:41 Moroccan time). In the area of Cape Tres Forcas (the headland on which Melilla is situated), low visibility is common, as clouds accumulate between the valleys formed by the steep mountains of the cape. The descent continued in Instrument meteorological conditions. In communications with air traffic controllers, the pilot complained of the fog. Some of his last words were: "I see nothing".

At 6:49, there were two terrain awareness and warning system (TAWS, also known as GPWS) alerts of "terrain" in the cockpit, which indicates that the aircraft was too low. At 6:50, the aircraft impacted terrain at 886-foot (270 m) elevation and broke up.

=== Cause ===
The accident investigation concluded "Given the facts and analysis conducted, the Commission concluded that the accident was caused by a collision with terrain in IMC. This confirms the hypothesis put forward by members of the committee of investigation from the beginning of their investigations, it is a type of CFIT accident (Controlled Flight Into Terrain) due to a combination of several factors:

- Non-application of the arrival procedure, including descending below the minimum safe altitude
- Inadequate crew coordination
- Non-application of company procedures regarding GPWS alarm."
