= Aeroports de Catalunya =

Aeroports Públics de Catalunya S.L.U.
- Type: Government entity
- Industry: Aviation
- Founded: 2008
- Headquarters: Barcelona, (Catalonia, Spain)
- Area served: Catalonia
- Key people: Daniel Albalate (President of Aeroports de Catalunya)
- Services: Airport management
- Website: aeroports.gencat.cat

Aeroports de Catalunya is a public company, owned by the Government of Catalonia, and attached to its Ministry of Land and Sustainability. It manages airports, airfields or heliports which form part of the company or of the Catalan government.

It was created in 2008 with the aim of consolidating a model of airport management in Catalonia alternative to the Spanish government's Aena.

== Network ==
As of August 2010, Aeroports de Catalunya owned:

- Andorra–La Seu d'Urgell Airport
- Lleida–Alguaire Airport
- La Cerdanya Aerodrome (jointly owned with the local County Council)
