= Melilla Airlines =

Travel agency based in Melilla, Spain (2013–15)

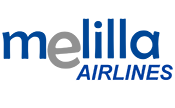
- Founded: 2013
- Commenced operations: 29 April 2013
- Ceased operations: 2015
- Headquarters: Melilla, Spain

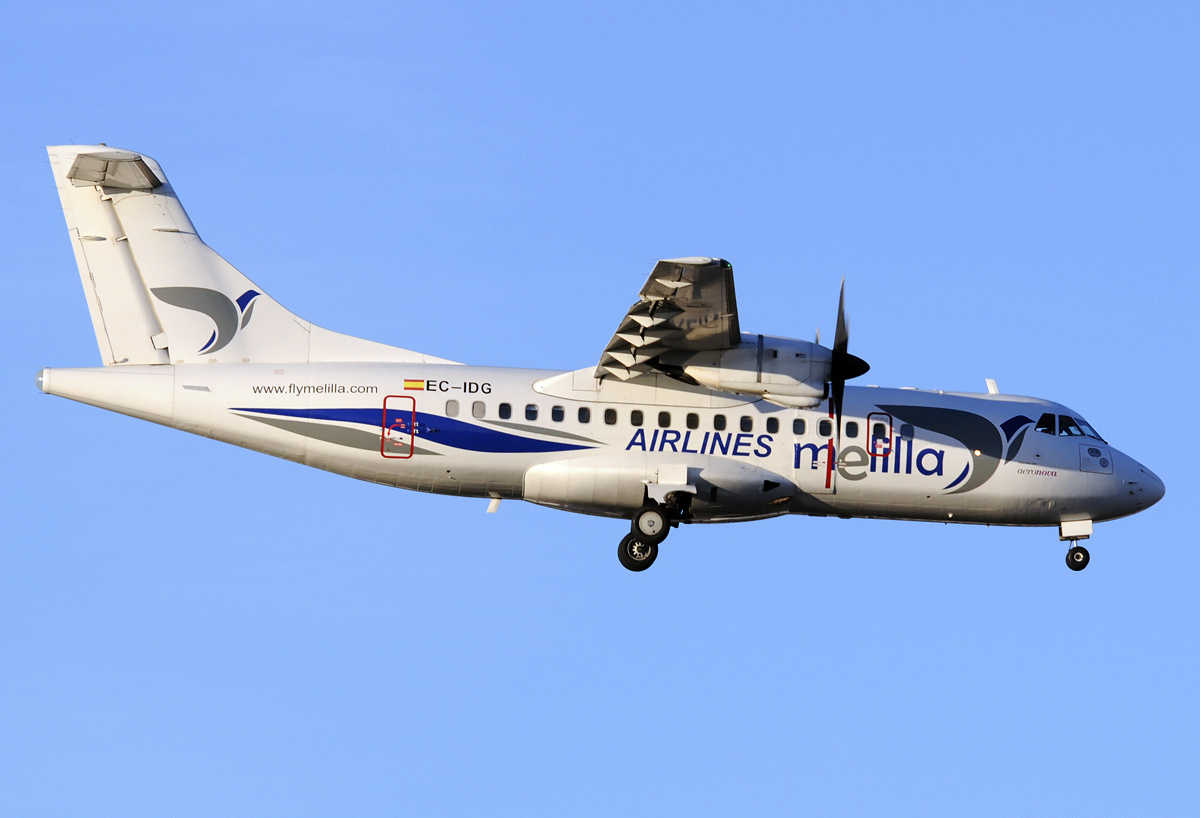
Melilla Airlines ATR-42-300

Melilla Airlines (a.k.a. Melilla Airways SL) was a travel agency based in Melilla, Spain. Its headquarters was Melilla Airport. In spite of the company's name, Melilla Airlines lacked a valid Air Operator Certificate. It was not a fully certified airline, but operated as a travel agency that re-sold flights from Aeronova.

== History ==
The agency was founded in 2013 and began operations on 29 April 2013, with the inaugural route of Málaga - Melilla. In February 2015, Aeronova terminated its collaboration with the company due to disputes, which resulted in Melilla Airlines being dissolved.

== Destinations ==
Spain

- Málaga – Málaga Airport
- Melilla – Melilla Airport
