= Lleida–Alguaire Airport =

Lleida–Alguaire Airport Aeroport Lleida-Alguaire

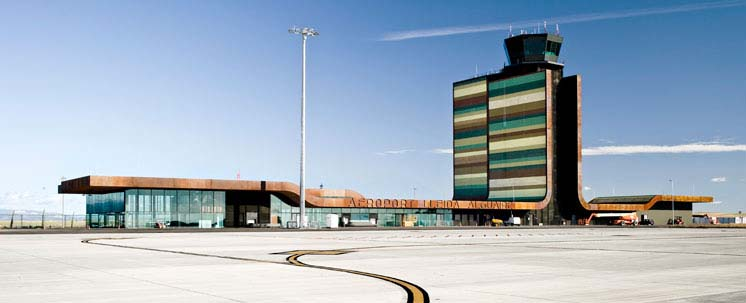
- IATA: ILD; ICAO: LEDA

Summary
- Airport type: Public
- Owner: Generalitat of Catalonia
- Operator: Aeroports de Catalunya
- Serves: Andorra and Lleida
- Location: Alguaire, Spain
- Opened: 17 January 2010; 16 years ago
- Elevation AMSL: 1,148 ft (350 m)
- Coordinates: 41°43′40″N 000°32′09″E
- Website: aeroportlleida.cat/en/

Map
- Location within Spain

Runways
Direction	Length		Surface
Direction	m	ft	Surface
13/31	2,500	8,202	Asphalt

Lleida–Alguaire Airport (IATA: ILD, ICAO: LEDA) (Catalan: Aeroport de Lleida-Alguaire, Spanish: Aeropuerto de Lérida-Alguaire) is an airport located in Alguaire, Catalonia, Spain; about 15 km (9.3 mi) from the centre of Lleida and about 150 km (93 mi) from the centre of Barcelona.

== History ==
Lleida–Alguaire was designed as a regional airport to provide both passenger and cargo transport to Western Catalonia (the Ponent region and Catalan Pyrenees), Andorra and some counties (comarques) in La Franja. The airport construction project had a budget of 130 million euro and it was the first airport built and owned by the Generalitat of Catalonia, via its public-capital company Aeroports de Catalunya. It is also one of the few Spanish airports not owned by Aena.

The original plan intended for the full redevelopment of the already existing Alfés aerodrome located south of Lleida but due to pressure from ecologist groups this plan never materialised. It was later decided to locate the airport north of the city next to the future A-14 highway because of its convenience. Together the airport and the highway, which ends abruptly a few kilometres north of the airport, have caused endless amounts of controversy over the years as locals consider both projects as fake promises and embezzlement of public funds.

The airport was inaugurated on 17 January 2010 with the arrival of an Airbus A320 from Barcelona operated by Vueling with members of the Catalan authorities and the press on-board.

Since then, following the success from other Spanish airports like Teruel Airport, Lleida-Alguaire has been working to position itself as an aircraft maintenance and aircraft storage facility, as well as cooperating with both public and private research projects. In recent years, the airport has also gained popularity as a flight training location.

== Airlines and destinations ==
Airlines	Destinations
Iberia	Palma de Mallorca; Seasonal: Ibiza, Menorca

== Statistics ==
Lleida Airport Passenger Totals 2010-2016 (x10.000)
Updated: 8 March 2018.

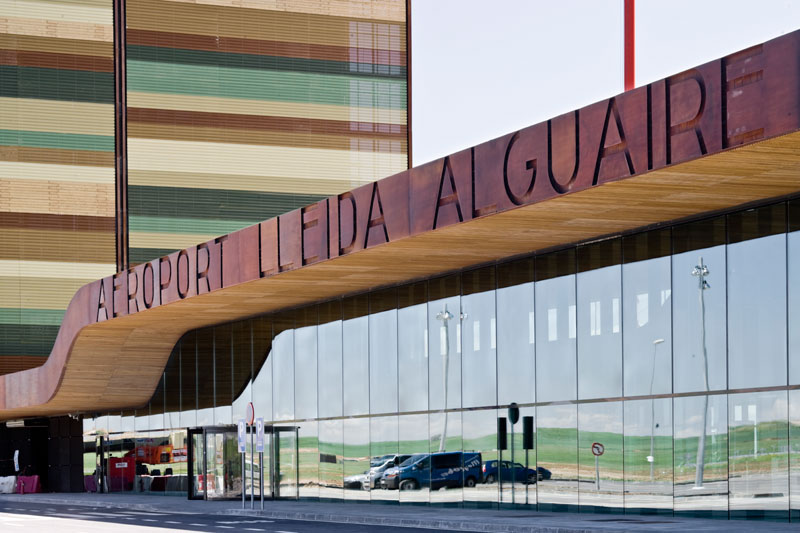
Airport Entrance

The following table shows total passenger numbers at Lleida–Alguaire Airport from 2010 to date.

Year	Passengers (thousands)
2010	62
2011	33
2012	33
2013	29
2014	30
2015	30
2016	33
Source: Aeroports de Catalunya

== Ground transportation ==
Two new highways, the Autovías A-14 and A-22, provide road access to the airport.
