= PauknAir =

Spanish regional airline, 1995–1998

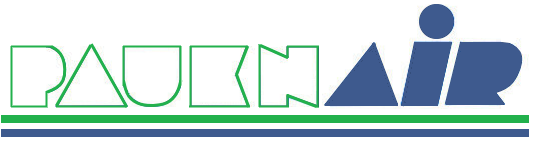
IATA	ICAO	Call sign
PV	PNR	PAUKNAIR
- Founded: 1995
- Commenced operations: September 1995
- Ceased operations: November 1998
- Operating bases: Melilla Airport
- Fleet size: 2
- Destinations: Domestic scheduled
- Headquarters: Melilla, Spain
- Website: www.melilla.com/pauknair

PauknAir, also known as Melilla Jet, was a Spanish regional airline which operated between 1995 and 1998. The airline operated flights between various Spanish domestic destinations.

== History ==
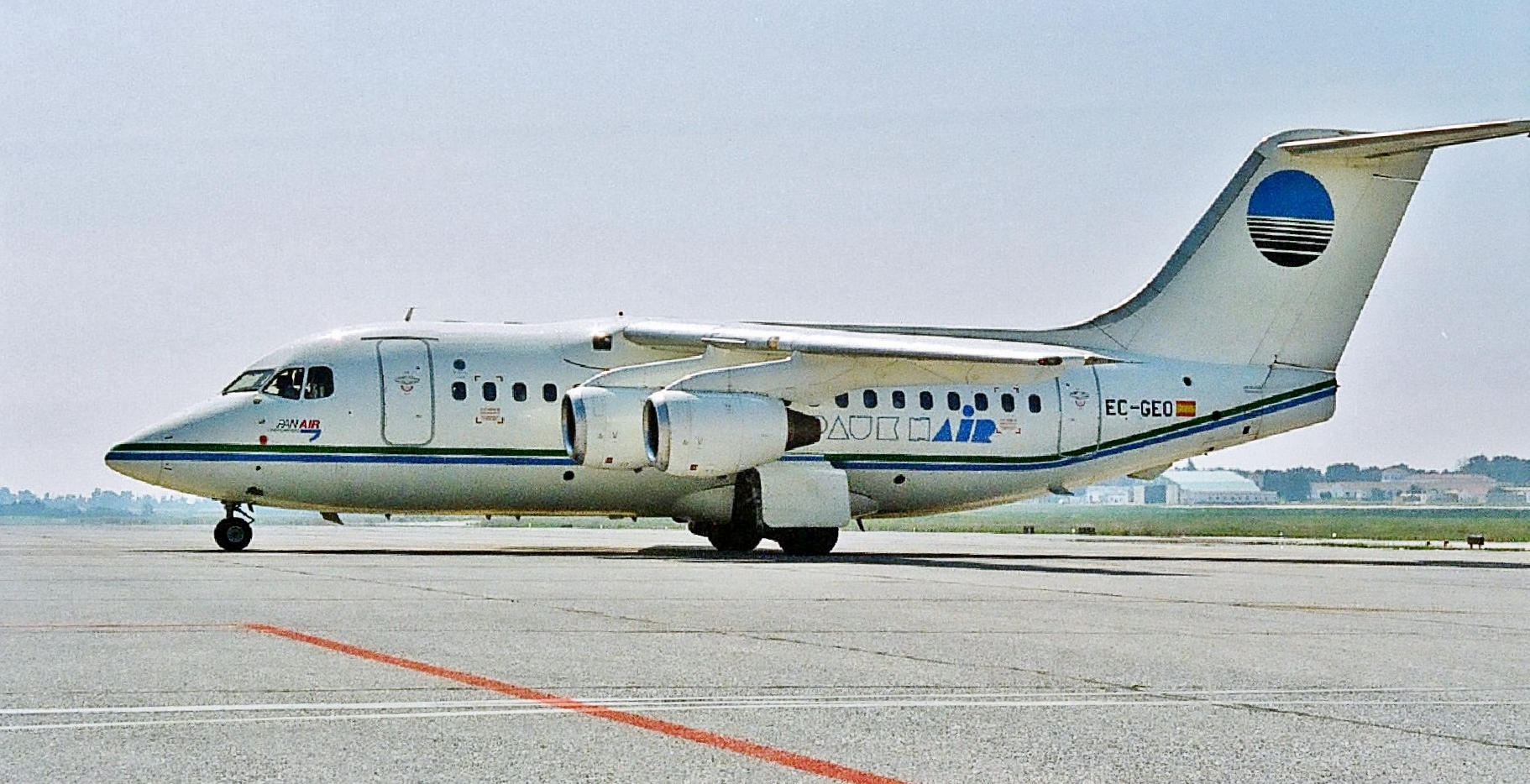
An PauknAir BAe 146, April 1997 at Malaga Airport. This aircraft would later be involved in the crash of PauknAir Flight 4101 in 1998

PauknAir was founded in 1995 and commenced operations in September 1995 with two BAe 146 aircraft operated on its behalf by PAN Air. It was majority owned by Paukner SA, a Spanish company involved in the travel industry, with a 78% holding; private interests based in Melilla, a Spanish exclave in North Africa, held 20% of the company, with the remaining 2% held by the governing council of Melilla. The airline provided air services from Melilla to Madrid and Málaga.

In November 1998, PauknAir ceased operations following the crash of PauknAir Flight 4101 on 25 September 1998. The crash caused a drop in passenger numbers for PauknAir; this sealed the fate for the airline.

== Fleet ==
PauknAir operated the following aircraft before ceasing operations:

- 2 British Aerospace BAe 146-100

== Accidents and incidents ==
- On 25 September 1998, PauknAir Flight 4101 flew into a hill on approach to Melilla; all 34 passengers and four crew died.
