= Ryjet =

Spanish airline, 1999–2012

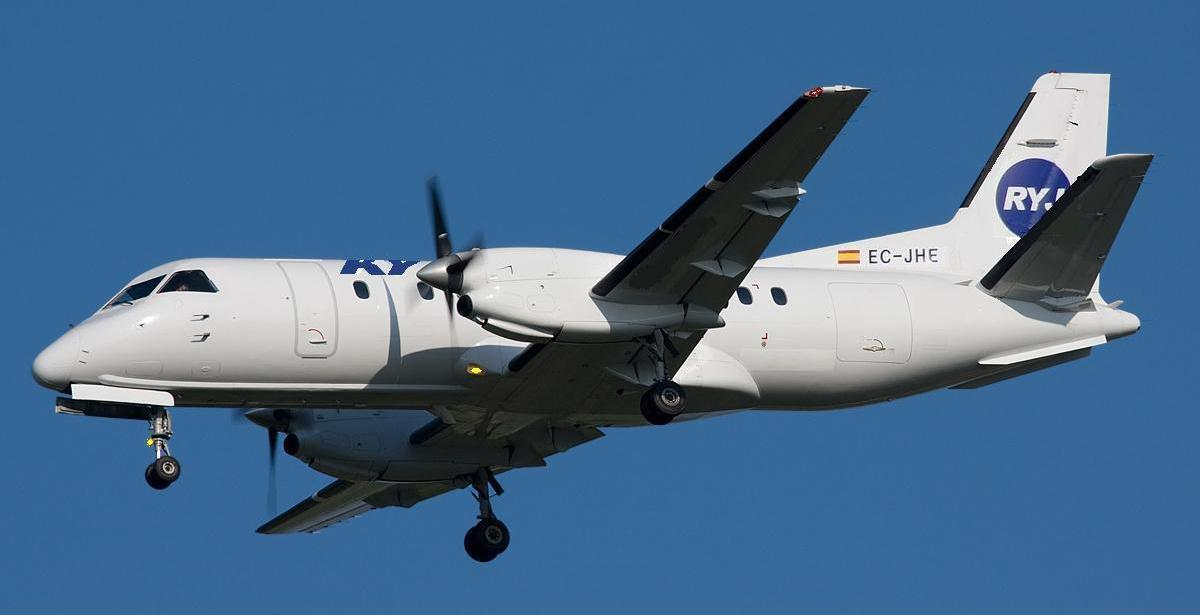
- Ryjet Saab 340
IATA	ICAO	Call sign
W2	RYJ	RYJET
- Commenced operations: 1999
- Ceased operations: 2012
- Operating bases: Málaga Airport Melilla Airport
- Fleet size: Fleet below
- Headquarters: Campanillas

Ryjet, also known as RYJET - Aerotaxis del Mediterraneo, was a small Spanish airline based in Málaga. Despite its name, the airline's fleet included no jets, only turboprop aircraft.

== History ==
The airline was founded in 1999 and projected to operate air taxi, cargo and charter services covering Spain, Portugal and Morocco. Most of its operations, however, were between Málaga and Melilla. By 2011, the airline had established a kind of airbridge between the southern Spanish city and the Spanish possession on the Moroccan coast raising the number of its flights to 108 per month.

Ryjet made headlines in 2007 when it was revealed that it had asked high amounts as down-payments to pilots who wished to work for the company. In the following years, other irregularities were detected in the operation of the airline.

By March 2012, Ryjet had run into severe financial trouble and had difficulties paying its bills; three months later —owing to default in payments to its lessors and to its employees— Ryjet announced that it ceased operations.

== Fleet ==
- 1 Saab 340
- 1 BAE Jetstream

== See also ==
- List of defunct airlines of Spain
