= Andorra–La Seu d'Urgell Airport =

Andorra–La Seu d'Urgell Airport Aeroport Andorra–La Seu d'Urgell Aeropuerto Andorra–La Seu d'Urgell
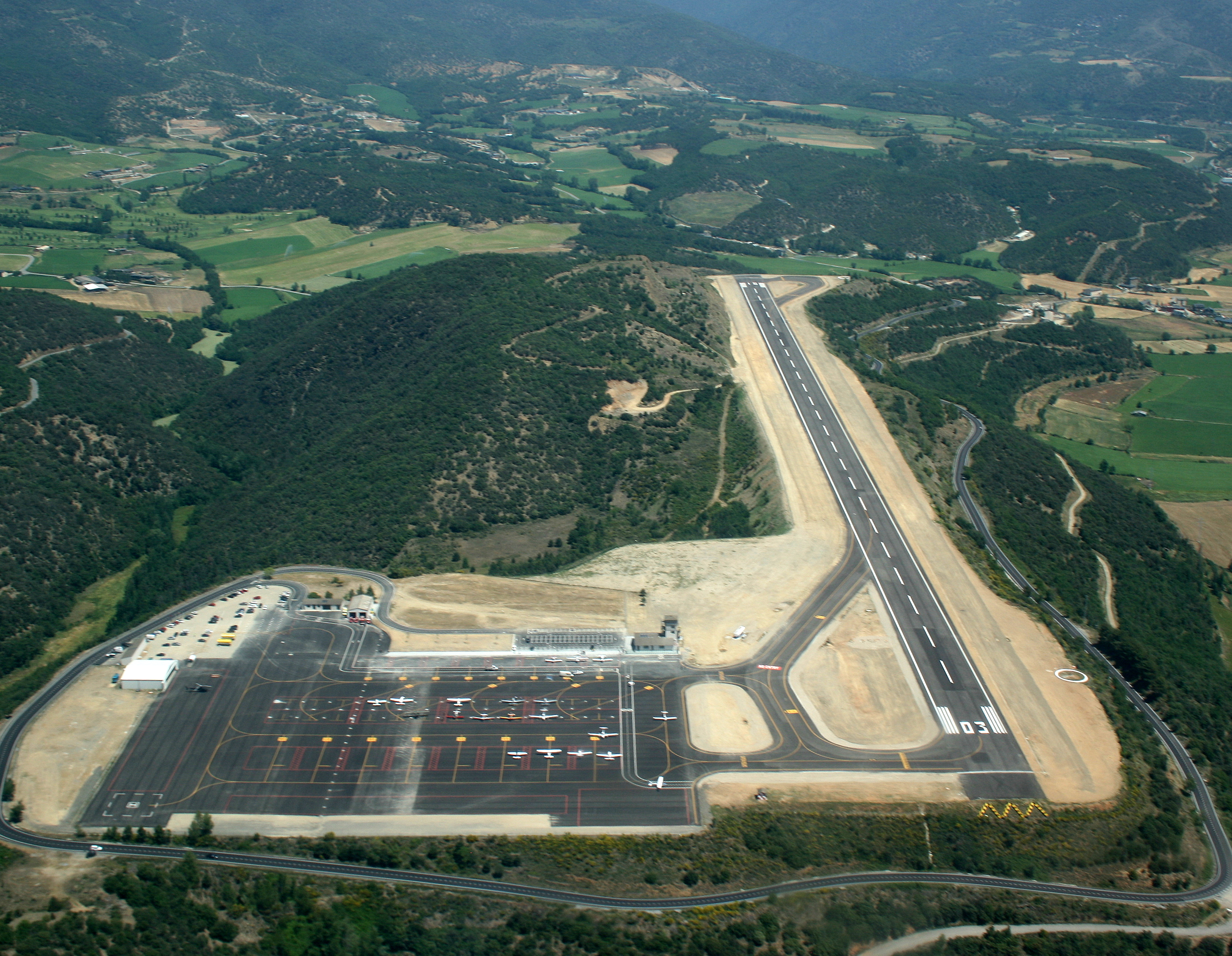
- IATA: LEU; ICAO: LESU

Summary
- Airport type: Public
- Owner: Generalitat de Catalunya
- Operator: Aeroports de Catalunya
- Serves: La Seu d'Urgell (Spain) and Andorra
- Location: Montferrer i Castellbò, Spain
- Hub for: Andorra Airlines
- Elevation AMSL: 2,630 ft (800 m)
- Coordinates: 42°20′29″N 1°24′17″E
- Website: aeroportandorralaseu.cat/

Map
- Location within Spain

Runways
Direction	Length		Surface
Direction	ft	m	Surface
03/21	4,157	1,267	Asphalt

Andorra–La Seu d'Urgell Airport (Catalan: Aeroport Andorra–La Seu d'Urgell, Spanish: Aeropuerto Andorra–La Seu d'Urgell; IATA: LEU, ICAO: LESU) is a public airport owned by the government of Catalonia and hosts general aviation and commercial flights. It is located in the municipality of Montferrer i Castellbò in Catalonia, eastern Spain, and serves the city of La Seu d'Urgell and the microstate of Andorra, which is 12 km north of the airport. The airport has a short runway which limits aircraft sizes and the distance to destinations.

== History ==
La Seu d'Urgell airfield opened in 1982 but was closed to commercial traffic in 1984 and was used only by private aircraft until 2008, when the airport was purchased by the Catalan government and closed pending its redevelopment and reopening as a commercial airport. In 2008, the Institut Català del Sòl (a department of the Catalan government) bought 85% of the airport's land to create Pirineus–La Seu d'Urgell Airport. In 2009, a contract was awarded to Acsa Sorigué for the redevelopment work towards reopening the airport.

The airport reopened on 4 June 2010. In the first year there was a total of 1,751 flights, with more than 3,000 people on board. An agreement between the Catalan government and the Principality of Andorra, located 12 km away, was reached in 2014 to rename the facility Andorra–La Seu d'Urgell Airport following financial investment from Andorra.

On 8 January 2015, the airport opened as a public airport, and started receiving regular or tourist charter flights during 2015. Eight tourist charter flights per direction were operated by Swiftair during the summer 2015, four from Madrid, four from Palma de Mallorca. Air Andorra and Andorra Airlines were meant to begin operations in 2016, with both airlines using the airport as its main hub and offering flights to various airports in Spain and France. Neither airline ever began operations. French regional airline Twin Jet operated flights to the airport during March 2018, with routes from Madrid, Marseille and Palma de Mallorca.

In 2025, the airport has set an annual passenger record with a total of 19,160 travelers. The figure represents an 18% increase compared to 2024, when 16,188 users were recorded. Growth has been driven by regular connections to Palma and Madrid, operated twice a week. As for operations, the infrastructure recorded 6,187 movements over the year, 15% more than in 2024, when 5,396 were recorded.

== Airlines and destinations ==
The following airlines operate regular scheduled and charter flights at Andorra–La Seu d'Urgell Airport:

Airlines	Destinations
Chalair Aviation	Madrid, Palma de Mallorca, Paris Orly; Seasonal: Lyon, Nantes, Nice
Iberia	Madrid, Palma de Mallorca
