= Melilla Airport =

International airport in the Spanish autonomous city of Melilla

Melilla Airport Aeropuerto de Melilla

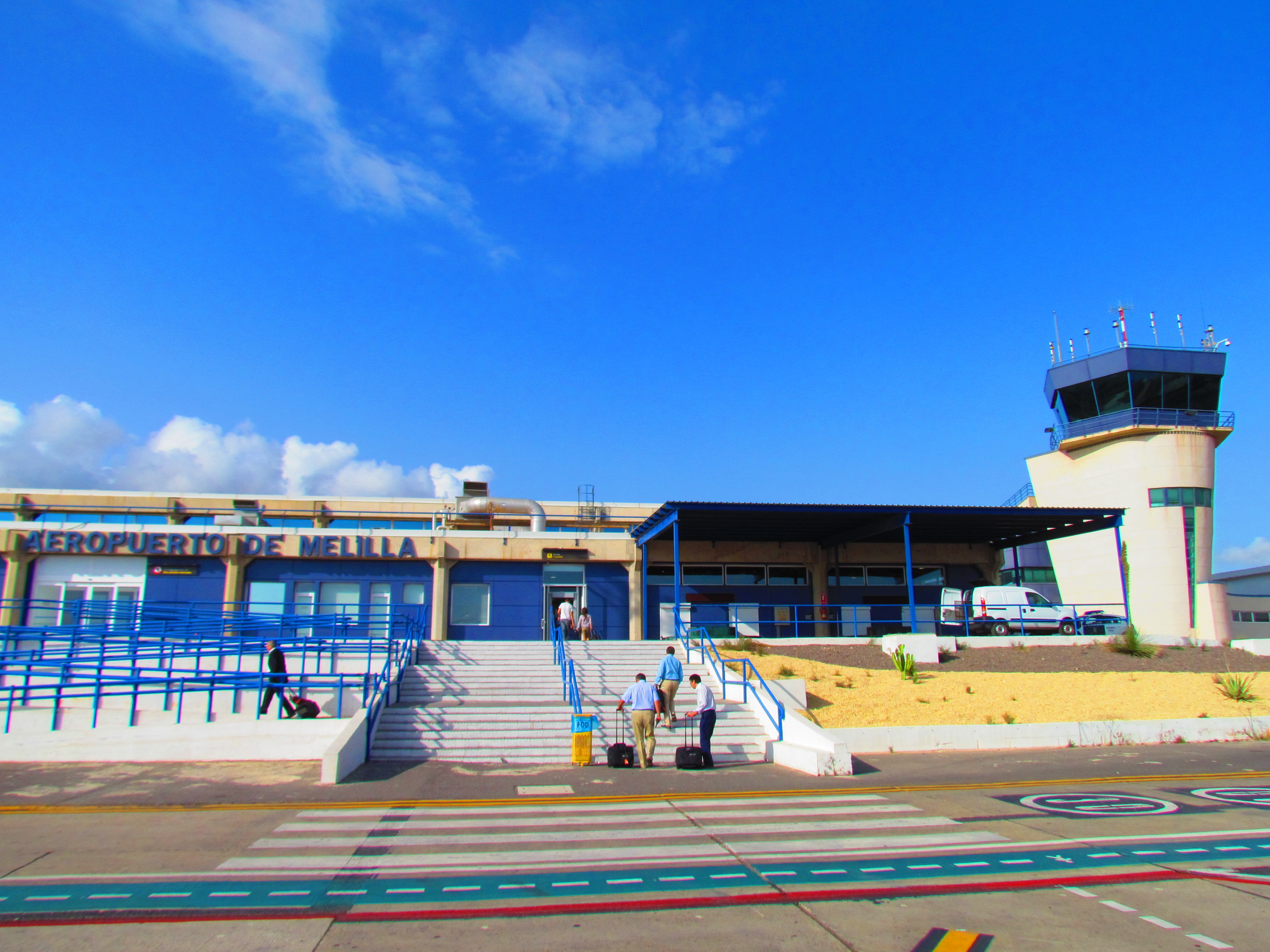
- IATA: MLN; ICAO: GEML

Summary
- Airport type: Public
- Owner/Operator: AENA
- Serves: Melilla
- Location: Melilla, Spain
- Opened: 1969
- Built: 1969; 57 years ago
- Elevation AMSL: 48 m (157 ft)
- Coordinates: 35°16′47″N 02°57′23″W
- Website: www.aena.es/en/melilla.html

Map
- Location of airport in Spain

Runways
Direction	Length		Surface
Direction	m	ft	Surface
15/33	1,433	4,701	Asphalt

Statistics (2024)
- Passengers: 507,957
- Passengers change 23–24: ▲1.4%
- Movements: ▲10,977
- Cargo (tonnes): ▲25 Source: Spanish AIP at EUROCONTROL and Melilla Airport Statistics, Aena

Melilla Airport (IATA: MLN, ICAO: GEML) is an airport in the Spanish autonomous city of Melilla, an exclave of Spain in north Africa. The airport is located about 4 km (2.5 mi) southwest of the city center, near the border with Morocco. It is the only airport in Spanish territory on the African coast. The airport currently ranks twenty-ninth at national level in terms of passenger numbers. It has the capacity to move up to 500,000 passengers and the annual average of passengers is around 490,000. In 2024 it reached 507,957 passengers. Currently, only one airline, Iberia Regional/Air Nostrum, operates commercial passenger flights from the airport to eleven Spanish cities: Almería, Asturias, Barcelona, Granada, Gran Canaria, Madrid, Málaga, Palma de Mallorca, Santiago de Compostela, Seville and Tenerife North. Between 1931 and 1967 Melilla was served by the Tauima Aerodrome (now Nador International Airport), even when Morocco had gained its independence in 1956. This airport opened in 1969.

== Schedule ==
Air operations hours are between 07:15 and 22:15 throughout the year.

== History ==
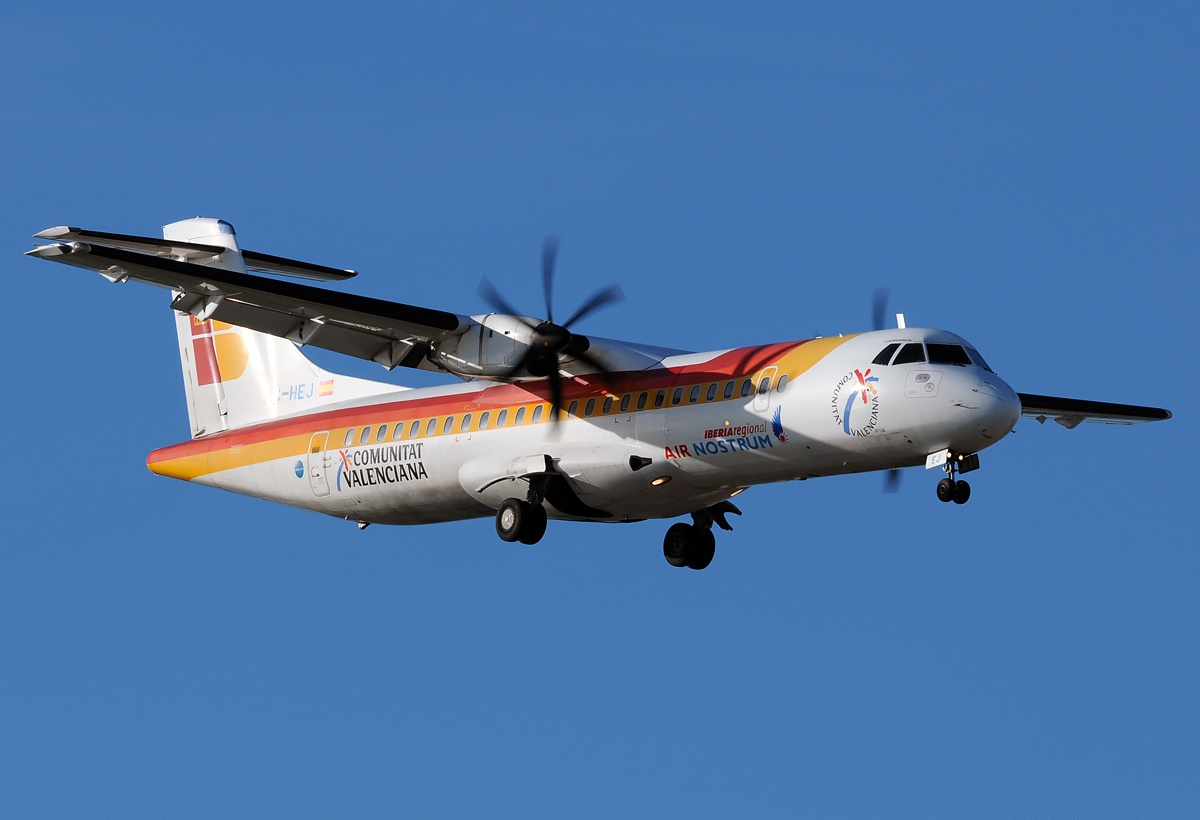
Iberia Regional/Air Nostrum ATR 72-600 currently connects Melilla with Málaga, Madrid, Granada, Almería, Seville and Barcelona, and seasonally with Palma de Mallorca and Gran Canaria

=== 20th century ===
In the 1920s, several military aerodromes were built in the area for the Air Arm of the Spanish Army:

- Ramel – now in Morocco
- Arcila – now in Morocco
- Zeluan – now in Morocco

Following the conflict between Spain and Morocco, a new military airfield was built near Cabrerizas Altas. This airport had a simple 300 m (984 ft) landing area. As tension settled and Spain was able to re-establish land around Melilla, this airport was relocated again further south of city.

The new airport, Tauima Aerodrome, was opened for civilian flights 1931 and used also by the military. The El Atalayón hydroplane air station (now site of oyster farm) in the Mar Chica was operational in the 1930s to provide additional air travel options using Dornier Do J seaplanes. In 1956 the end of the Spanish protectorate over northern Morocco placed the airport outside of control from Spain, although some investment from Spain was done in the aerodrome until 1958. Limited access to the airport was given to Melilla by secured bus until 1967. The Tauima aerodrome later became Nador International Airport.

In 1969, the current airport was opened within Melilla's borders and was strictly a civilian facility. Spantax began operating on it, with a De Havilland Canada DHC-6 Twin Otter, and later, with a De Havilland Canada DHC-7.

In 1980, Spantax was replaced by Aviaco, a subsidiary of Iberia at the time, which would use a Fokker F27.

In 1992, Binter Mediterráneo would enter, also a subsidiary of Iberia, which operated with CN-235, and which later replaced Aviaco. It linked the city of Melilla with: Málaga, Almería, Valencia and, in its last year, with Madrid.

In 1995, PauknAir entered service, which operated with BAe 146, and which broke Iberia's monopoly on operations from Melilla. It managed to connect the city with 7 national airports: Málaga, Madrid, Almería, Barcelona, Palma de Mallorca and it was the first time that it connected the city of Melilla with Santiago de Compostela and Santander. This airline would cease its operations in 1998.

In 1997, a historical record of 351,569 passengers was broken.

Sadly, PauknAir ceased operations after one of its planes crashed in 1998. After these events, a new VOR radio aid was built to support aircraft without having a published approach.

=== 21st century ===
For 2000, Aena anticipated a volume of 500,000 passengers per year, but the fatal PauknAir accident in 1998 and the subsequent construction of the Nador airport cut short the growth. Falling from 365,000 annual passengers (1,000 pax/day) to around 220,000 annually.

Definitively, in 2001, Air Nostrum acquired Binter Mediterráneo, thus keeping the monopoly of Melilla routes: Málaga, Almería, Valencia and Madrid. It began operating with Fokker 50, Dash 8 and later with ATR 72. Today is carrying out regional flights for Iberia.

In 2002, the new control tower was inaugurated, as well as new improvements to the airport infrastructure in the city.

In 2003, the departure of a Fokker 50 from the Dutch company Denim Air, operating for Air Nostrum, forced the replacement of the company's Fokker 50 and Dash 8 with the new ATR 72.

In 2004, Vueling carried out studies to implement the Barcelona-Melilla route, but never began operations due to the dimensions of the runway and the category of the airport. This route was moved to Nador. That same year, Airmel-Club Aéreo de Melilla appears teaching private airplane pilot classes, thus adding to the multiple visits of small planes, rallies and aerial hugs that have been taking place in the city throughout its history.

In February 2005, the runway expansion works were completed, thus going from 1,344 meters to 1,428 meters.

In October 2006, Air Nostrum began operating the Barcelona route, launching 4 weekly flights; and in March 2007 the operation was increased with a daily flight, reaching the record number for the route with 21,212 passengers transported.

In 2008, Air Nostrum implemented the Seville, Palma de Mallorca and Valencia routes, operated by the Dash 8. In addition, that same year, the airport obtained the European ISO 9001 quality and ISO 14001 environmental management certification.

At the beginning of 2009, Air Europa carried out tests with the Embraer 195 in the LGW simulator to present them to Civil Aviation to obtain the corresponding permits, made maximum landing weight approaches, on both runways, in all types of weather conditions, with engine failure, etc. They also tested takeoffs with different flap settings and weights, and aborted takeoffs. It was determined that the plane landed perfectly at maximum landing weight, and to take off, tables were obtained from the technical office with the maximum permissible weights for each destination. For routes like Madrid-Melilla, the number of passengers had to be limited to 110. In the Melilla-Madrid, Málaga-Melilla and Melilla-Málaga flights; there was no limitation. The company, finally, could not operate in Melilla because the classification of the airport, category 2C, did not allow the operation of the Embraer 195, category 3C.

At the beginning of 2011, Airmel announced that it was going to start operations from Melilla with an ATR 42-300, but it never started operations due to the airline's lack of commitment to continue with the incipient airline.

On 21 November 2011, Helitt Líneas Aéreas began operations with the inaugural route Málaga-Melilla; a week later the line Melilla-Barcelona began to operate and on 2 December, the route Melilla-Madrid, all with daily flights; that once again broke with the monopoly of Air Nostrum in operations from and with Melilla. On 25 January 2013, it temporarily stopped offering commercial flights. That same year Ryjet began operations with Málaga-Melilla, ceased operations in 2012.

At the beginning of 2013, there were rumors that Air Europa wanted to operate from Melilla, this time with one of its ATR 72-500, rumors that did not materialize.

On 16 April 2013, Melilla Airlines began operations with the inaugural route Málaga-Melilla, making regional flights with Málaga, months later with Badajoz Airport, although the connections with Badajoz did not give results, the occupation of the route to the Costa del Sol was good. A year and a half later, it ceased operations.

On 21 July 2014, Air Europa confirmed the previous rumors, took a step forward and decided to start operations with the inaugural route Málaga-Melilla with a first flight of around 90% occupancy.

At the end of the year 2016, Iberia announced the cancellation of the routes with Almería and Granada, a fact materialized at the beginning of January 2017, as there was a notable adjustment of its national routes in general and its structure as an airline.

Throughout the year 2018, the procedures for, under pressure from the Government of the Autonomous City itself and its citizens, given the widespread frustration and discomfort with the cancellation of the lines with Granada and Almería, are initiated, elaborated and formalized. after more than twenty years with daily and weekly flights, make the lines with Almería, Granada and Seville a public service obligation. This data means the resumption of services with Granada and Almería, and the new service with Seville, all of which are scheduled for the end of 2018 and the beginning of 2019.

On 30 November 2018, Hélity began operations with the inaugural route Ceuta-Melilla with a first flight of an AgustaWestland AW139.In January 2020 suspends the line with Melilla. The reason is that Melilla reported that helicopter operations at Melilla airport could only be carried out from sunrise to sunset.

Just one year later, on 30 November 2019 Aena announced the change of category from 2C to 3C in March 2021. Then there was talk of the second semester of 2022. Then the exact date was given: 30 November 2022 and now the Government delegate postpones it within a maximum period of two months, which would place a new limit in March of this year. The airport changes to category 3C on 23 February 2023.

In January 2022, Air Europa suspends the line with Melilla, the reason is that it will use its ATR 72 in the Canary Islands. The company has shown its interest in continuing to connect the city with the peninsula if the airport's classification changes or if the runway is expanded and larger aircraft such as the Embraer 195 of its fleet can land.

Melilla Airport closed 2022 as the busiest year in its history, 447,450 travelers, bordering on its capacity limit of 500,000 passengers/year.

At the beginning of 2023, the Romanian airline AirConnect proposed a connectivity plan for Melilla with Málaga, Madrid and other European cities such as Porto, Lisbon and Faro.

In July 2023, the government of Melilla requested that the airlines with Madrid and Málaga be declared Public Service Obligations, the extension of the airport's schedule and landing strip.

In October 2023, EasyJet and Binter Canarias showed their interest in operating in Melilla and the need to expand the landing strip for their respective Airbus A319 and Embraer 195-E2. In addition, Aena gave the go-ahead so that, starting in April 2024, the airport's hours will be between 07:15 and 22:15 throughout the year. Also, Aena put out to tender the work to expand the airport's departure lounge. In addition, the local government announced tourist vouchers that will subsidize 75% of air transportation to "non-resident" travelers in Melilla.

Melilla airport closed 2023 with a total of 501,069 passengers and 10,755 operations, exceeding, for the first time in its history, half a million travelers and 10,000 landings and takeoffs in one year and exceeding 100% of its capacity limit. 500,000 passengers/year.

In November 2024, following the cancellations and diversions to Málaga due to low clouds, the Government of Melilla presented a non-legislative proposal in the Congress of Deputies, the main objective of which is to ask the Government of Spain to create a technical commission to study both the extension of the runway and the elements of satellite navigation that are viable for the Melilla airport. In addition to declaring the Málaga and Madrid lines as a public service obligation.

At the end of 2024, Moeve has supplied sustainable aviation fuel (SAF) to Air Nostrum at Melilla Airport. The energy company thus becomes the first company to offer this biofuel in the autonomous city, as it also recently did at airports in the Canary Islands.

The year 2024 has marked the record for the "highest volume of traffic" in the history of Melilla airport, with a total of 507,957 passengers and 10,977 flights.

In January 2025, Binter Canarias announced that it is evaluating the feasibility of operating flights at Melilla Airport following recent improvements to its infrastructure. In 2024, the airline had identified difficulties operating its Embraer 195-E2 due to the airport's runway limitations. However, with the airport's classification being upgraded from 2C to 3C, larger aircraft are now permitted to operate. This improvement opens the possibility for greater connectivity for Melilla, potentially facilitating new air routes between the city and other parts of Spain.

In February 2025, Air Nostrum announced new routes to Asturias and Tenerife North.

In April 2025, the Joint Committee on Insularity of the Congress approved the creation of a technical commission to study the extension of the runway at Melilla Airport. The commission will assess the technical, economic, and environmental feasibility of the project, in light of the sustained increase in passenger numbers and the operational limitations of the current airfield. The proposal was supported by the PP, Vox, and Canarian Coalition, while the PSOE voted against it and Sumar abstained.

== Runway expansion ==
Initially, a runway measuring 1,600 m × 45 m (5,249 ft × 148 ft) was proposed, in a first phase, which could be extended to 2,280 m (7,480 ft). Finally, the new airport had a runway 750 m (2,460 ft) long by 45 m (148 ft) wide. In 1974, the work to extend the flight runway from the initial 750 m to 975 m (3,199 ft) was completed.

In 1982, the runway was extended again to 1,080 m (3,540 ft), after the accident on 6 March 1980, a De Havilland Canada Dash 7 from Spantax. In 1995, with the entry of PauknAir, the flight runway was extended by 300 m (980 ft), whose total length on that date was 1,347 m (4,419 ft).

In February 2005, after a Fokker 50 of Air Nostrum left the runway in 2003 during landing, the last runway extension of 118 m (387 ft) was put into service towards the south which also made it necessary to bury the airport access road, resulting in a new total length of 1,433 m (4,701 ft), whose length is the one today it owns the Melilla infrastructure. The current runway dimensions limit operations to the ATR 72 model.

The northern orography of Melilla means that the threshold of runway 15 (north) is displaced 235 m (771 ft), resulting in an available landing distance of only 1,198 m (3,930 ft). To the south, the landing distance from Melilla is greater: 1,371 m (4,498 ft).

With the current dimensions of the Melilla airport, airlines could begin operating with aircraft with between 110 and 180 seats, such as the EMB195; Airbus 220; Airbus 318/319/320; Boeing737. On the other hand, very penalized. The local orography causes this threshold to be moved to the north, which greatly penalizes the payload (passengers and suitcases) and distance from which it would be arrived. This last point is very important to be able to reach central Europe, especially in the case of takeoff distances declared by both airports.

With the change of category to 3C and adaptation of the approach to type C, companies with aircraft such as the A320 and the Boeing737 can operate with the current dimensions in Melilla, but with penalties, which is why it is necessary to extend the runway by 270 m (890 ft), towards the south and another 350 m (1,150 ft), useful to the north.

With the arrival of more operators and competition in routes and prices, the quality of the passage is improved and it is even more justified, if possible, to expand the runway.

Despite the increase in passengers and the demands for the expansion of the runway or its adaptation to other aircraft models with greater capacity, this has not been carried out by Aena, making it impossible for other airlines to arrive nor new routes.

The airport's Master Plan does not contemplate expanding the runway because only the aircraft ATR 72 and the destinations Málaga and Madrid are analyzed. Despite the fact that the ATR needs 1,853 m (6,079 ft) of runway to operate at maximum load and range.

Takeoff

The runway length necessary to take off in MTOW conditions, as well as its range if they carried, in those conditions, their MPL. This track length is reflected in the table:

Aircraft	MTOW (kg)	MPL (kg)	TORL (m)	Range (NM)
ATR-72	21,500	7,500	1,853	597

With the current runway – 1,433 m (4,701 ft) for takeoffs in the 15 direction and 1,372 m (4,501 ft) m for takeoffs in the 33 – direction the ATR-72 aircraft operates with limitations in its payload. However, for the main destinations operated from the airport, Málaga which is 112 nautical miles (207 km; 129 mi) distant and Madrid which is 314 nautical miles (582 km; 361 mi) distant, there are no limitations regarding the number of passengers transported.

Landing

The runway length necessary to land the ATR-72 aircraft under Maximum Landing Weight (MLW) conditions has been analyzed as it is the most restrictive. The results obtained are shown in this table:

Aircraft	MLW	Length dry runway (m)
ATR-72	21,350	1,124

With the current runway and under MLW conditions, the aircraft analyzed can operate without landing weight limitation.

In July 2023, the Melilla government promoted an expansion of the airport runway.

== Operations ==
Melilla Airport has the following air spaces and dependencies to carry out its functions: Melilla Corridor. Operations between Melilla Airport and the Peninsula are carried out along the Melilla Corridor. The AIP ENR 2.1 classifies this Corridor as uncontrolled airspace (Class G), specifying that flights at FL60 or lower will be under the jurisdiction of Sevilla ACC, and flights at FL70 or higher will be under the jurisdiction of Casablanca ACC. These are the following declared distances for 1.428 m runway by its threshold 15 and 33:

Designation	TORA (m)	ASDA (m)	TODA (m)	LDA (m)
15	1,433	1,433	1,433	1,198
33	1,371	1,371	1,371	1,371

The airport changes its category to category 3C on 23 February 2023 after the announcement by Aena that it allows the operation of jet aircraft such as the CRJ-200, Embraer 170, Embraer 195-E2, Bae 146, Airbus A220, Airbus A318, Airbus A319, Airbus A320, Airbus A320neo and Boeing 737, all of them penalized in payload (passenger and luggage) and distance from which they would arrive. It is necessary to extend the runway by 270 m., towards the south and another 350 m., useful to the north so that these jet planes can operate without penalty.

The geopolitical situation of the city means that the approach of the aircraft has to be done 'in a curved way', so as not to invade Moroccan airspace and hence the difficulty in installing the ILS (Instrument Landing System) guidance system in straight line that works in most airports in the world. The current radio aids (VOR/DME and NDB) are on Melilla soil, but they do not prevent the city from being cut off on days with low clouds at 700/800 feet. With an offset locator or RNAV (satellite) Approach System, airport operations with adverse weather conditions would be allowed.

Melilla airport, despite its low traffic, is located next to the Moroccan border and, since there is no agreement with Morocco, planes must perform difficult maneuvers during takeoffs and landings to avoid entering airspace from Morocco. Even so, there is no cause for concern as so far there have been no problems related to that.

== Infrastructure ==
=== Terminal ===
The terminal has a total of 6 check-in counters, 3 boarding gates and 2 baggage reclaim carousels. It also has a Support Office for Passengers, Users and Clients / It is in charge of processing the suggestions of the passengers on the services and facilities of the airport. It also has claim forms from Aena Aeropuertos; Security control, passport control and a Melilla Turismo Stand in the arrivals area.

=== Airfield ===
- Control tower
- Runway 15/33: 1433 m
- Platform: 6 parking spaces.
- Helicopter Platform: 1 parking space
- Fire station

== Awards ==
In 2014, the Melilla Delegation of the Spanish Committee of People with Disabilities (CERMI) recognized Melilla Airport with the CERMI MELILLA 2014 AWARD for its "Barrier-Free" service for people with reduced mobility. (PMR).

In 2018 and 2019, it was recognized with the Airport Service Quality, ASQ award by the ACI for the best European airport for the quality of service provided to the traveler.

== Airlines and destinations ==
The following airlines operate regular scheduled and charter flights at Melilla Airport:

Airlines	Destinations
Iberia	Almería, Granada, Gran Canaria, Palma de Mallorca, Seville; Seasonal: Asturias, Santiago de Compostela

== Statistics ==
=== Passenger figures ===
Melilla Airport passengers • 2000–2023 (data in hundreds of thousands/passengers)

Passenger traffic by destination 2024 (data in hundreds of thousands/passengers)

Number of passengers, operations and cargo since the year 2000:

Year	Passenger	Change	Operations	Change	Cargo (t)	Change
2000	263,751	——	8,916	——	650	——
2001	229,806	▼12.9%	8,707	▼2.3%	587	▼9.7%
2002	211,966	▼7.8 %	8,013	▼8.0 %	546	▼7.0 %
2003	223,437	▲5.4%	9,017	▲12.5%	479	▼12.3%
2004	245.102	▲9.7 %	9.098	▲0.9%	387	▼19.2%
2005	271,589	▲10.8%	9,296	▲2.2%	323	▼16.6%
2006	313,543	▲15.4%	10,696	▲15.1%	431	▲33.5%
2007	339,244	▲8.2%	11,146	▲4.2%	434	▲0.6%
2008	314,643	▼ -7.3%	10,959	▼10.7%	386	▼11.0%
2009	293,695	▼6.7%	9,245	▼15.6%	350	▼9.2%
2010	292,608	▼0.4%	8,935	▼3.4 %	340	▼2.8%
2011	286,701	▼2.0 %	9,119	▲2.1%	265	▼22.0 %
2012	315,850	▲10.2%	9,922	▲8.8%	235	▼11.3%
2013	289,551	▼8.3%	7,893	▼20.4 %	164	▼30.2%
2014	319,603	▲10.4%	8,873	▲12.4%	136	▼17.0 %
2015	317,806	▼0.5%	8,409	▼5.2 %	136	▼0.2%
2016	330,116	▲3.9%	8,535	▲1.5%	141	▲3.8%
2017	324,366	▼1.7%	7,956	▼6.8 %	134	▼4.5%
2018	348,121	▲7.3%	8,085	▲1.6%	127	▼5.3%
2019	434,660	▲24.9%	9,768	▲20.8%	134	▲5.3%
2020	195,636	▼55.0%	5,158	▼47.2%	32	▼76.1%
2021	332,446	▲69.9%	7,828	▲51.8%	9	▼69.1%
2022	447,450	▲34.6%	9,772	▲24.8%	22	▲122.7%
2023	501,069	▲12.0%	10,755	▲10.1%	25	▲11.6%
2024	507,957	▲1.4%	10,977	▲2.1%	31,934	▲29.4%
Source: Aena Statistics

=== Busiest domestic destinations ===
Position	Destination	Passengers	Change(%)
1	Málaga	232,876	▲5
2	Madrid	133,000	▲14.4
3	Granada	51,740	▲20.7
4	Almería	47,762	▲25.4
5	Seville	20,450	▲3.5
6	Barcelona	10,000	▲44.1
7	Gran Canaria	2,965	▲0.1
8	Palma de Mallorca	5,119	▲68.6
9	Santiago de Compostela	586	▲0
10	Tenerife North	0	▲0
11	Asturias	0	▲0
Source: Melilla Airport, AENA.

== Military use ==
Melilla Airport is frequently used by the Spanish Air Force as an airport of departure and arrival of soldiers destined for missions carried out by the Spanish Army abroad.

== Access ==
Cars access the airport from the city center using the ML-204 road, which also connects with the ring road ML-300.

There is a taxi rank near the arrivals hall.

Melilla airport also has a vehicle for hire (vehículos de turismo con conductor, or VTC) service that operates in the city.

== Incidents and accidents ==
- In 1944, a Ju 52 plane from Iberia L.A.E. made an emergency landing on a plain at Cabo de Tres Forcas. There were no casualties. The fuselage of this plane was used as a throne for the Virgin of Hope (Málaga).
- On 25 September 1998, PauknAir Flight 4101, a BAe 146, crashed into a hill on approach to Melilla, killing all 38 occupants.
- On 17 January 2003, an Air Nostrum Fokker 50, operating for Iberia, overran the runway and broke apart. Nine people were injured, but there were no fatalities.

== See also ==
- Sania Ramel Airport
