= Palma de Mallorca Airport =

International airport on Mallorca, Spain

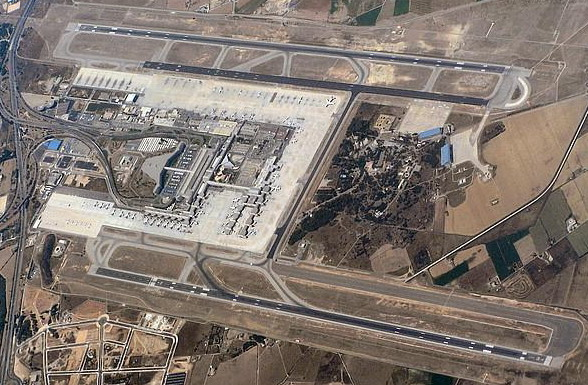
- IATA: PMI; ICAO: LEPA

Summary
- Airport type: Public and military
- Owner/Operator: AENA
- Serves: Mallorca
- Location: Palma de Mallorca, Spain
- Focus city for: Air Europa; easyJet Europe; Eurowings Europe; Norwegian Air Shuttle; Ryanair; Vueling
- Elevation AMSL: 8 m (26 ft)
- Coordinates: 39°33′06″N 002°44′20″E
- Website: www.aena.es/en/palma-mallorca-airport/index.html

Maps
- Airport diagram

- Location within Spain

Runways
Direction	Length		Surface
Direction	m	ft	Surface
06L/24R	3,270	10,728	Asphalt
06R/24L	3,000	9,842	Asphalt

Statistics (2025)
- Passengers: 33,806,427
- Passenger change 24-25: ▲1.5%
- Aircraft movements: 246,486
- Movements change 24-25: ▲6.2%
- Cargo (kilos): 5,836,421
- Cargo change 24-25: ▼13.6%
- Sources: Passenger Traffic, AENA; Spanish AIP, AENA

Palma de Mallorca Airport (IATA: PMI, ICAO: LEPA) — also known as Son Sant Joan Airport – is an international airport located eight kilometres (five miles) east of Palma, Mallorca, Spain, adjacent to the village of Can Pastilla.

In 2024, the airport handled 33.3 million passengers, making it the third busiest airport in Spain, after Madrid–Barajas and Barcelona–El Prat; and the fourteenth in Europe. The airport is the main base for the Spanish carrier Air Europa and also a focus airport for Eurowings, EasyJet, Jet2.com, Ryanair and Vueling. The airport shares runways with the nearby Son Sant Joan Air Force Base, operated by the Spanish Air and Space Force.

== History ==
=== Early years ===
The interest of the Spanish Government in developing airmail during the first decades of the 20th century, led to a study of the possibility of establishing an air mail line to the Balearic Islands. Finally, in 1921, the company Aeromarítima Mallorquina established the postal line Barcelona – Palma, which used seaplanes in the port of Palma de Mallorca. Before the creation of this airline, trials were complete in two flat fields: Son Sant Joan and Son Bonet, both of which were later chosen for the construction of aerodromes.

In 1934, the company Aero-Taxi de Mallorca was created with the intention of starting tourist flights to the island, establishing a flight school in Son Sant Joan. A year later, another one was founded in Son Bonet.

In May 1935 the company LAPE, Líneas Aéreas Postales Españolas (Spanish Postal Airlines), a predecessor of Iberia; was founded. A month later, in August, the first regular air route between Madrid and Palma, stopping at Valencia, was created using the Son Sant Joan aerodrome. A year later, this line was replaced by a new one connecting Palma and Barcelona. Three years later, Lufthansa and Iberia established new lines in Son Bonet, while Son Sant Joan was beginning to be used by the military. Through the years, Son Bonet became the main civilian airport on the island, while the creation of Son Sant Joan Air Force Base limited further civilian enterprises at the aerodrome.

In 1954, the runway was enlarged and paved to enable the operation of F-86 Sabre fighters, which also meant the diversion of the Palma–Llucmajor road. During those years, the first paved taxiways and aprons were built, while Son Bonet received the first big groups of European tourists through the airlines BEA, Air France and Aviaco.

=== International airport ===
The increase in traffic, and the inability to enlarge Son Bonet led the authors of the 1958 National Airport Plan to propose building a large civilian airport near the Son Sant Joan airbase. The National Airport Council approved this plan the following year and commercial traffic was transferred from Son Bonet to Son Sant Joan. This was the birth of what today is known as the Palma de Mallorca Airport. During that year, a terminal and a civilian apron were built south of the military facilities, along with a VHF communication center. Also, a VOR was installed on the island.

Finally, on 7 July 1960, the airport was opened to both domestic and international traffic.

Just two weeks later, expansion of the airport was declared urgent by the government, and on summer 1961 the works of extension of the runway and taxiway were started. At the end of the year, more plans were made, including a power plant, a communications centre and fire and rescue facilities.

=== Growth since the 1960s ===
In 1980, passenger growth led to the construction of yet another new terminal building, the current central terminal building. This building is now the airport's primary entrance and exit and houses the airport's check-in and baggage claim areas. Construction started in mid-1993 and it was designed by the Majorcan architect Pere Nicolau Bover. During the construction in 1995, passenger numbers exceeded 15 million. The new terminal finally opened in 1997.

=== Development since 2000 ===
Following a decline in passenger numbers at the airport following the September 11 attacks in 2001, passenger numbers rose steadily between 2002 and 2007 when traffic peaked at 23.2 million passengers. From 2007 onward there was a decline in passenger numbers, with 21.1 million using the airport in 2010. Today, Palma de Mallorca airport carries over 29.7 million passengers per year to their destinations, with 178,253 aircraft movements, mostly to mainland Spain, Germany and the United Kingdom.

In November 2015, Air Berlin (1978–2017) announced that it would shut down its hub operations at the airport which it had maintained for over ten years. All seven domestic connection routes to the mainland, such as flights to Valencia, Bilbao and Sevilla, as well as the route to Faro in Portugal ceased during spring 2016.

In June 2024, torrential rains flooded the airport, leading to delays.

== Terminals ==
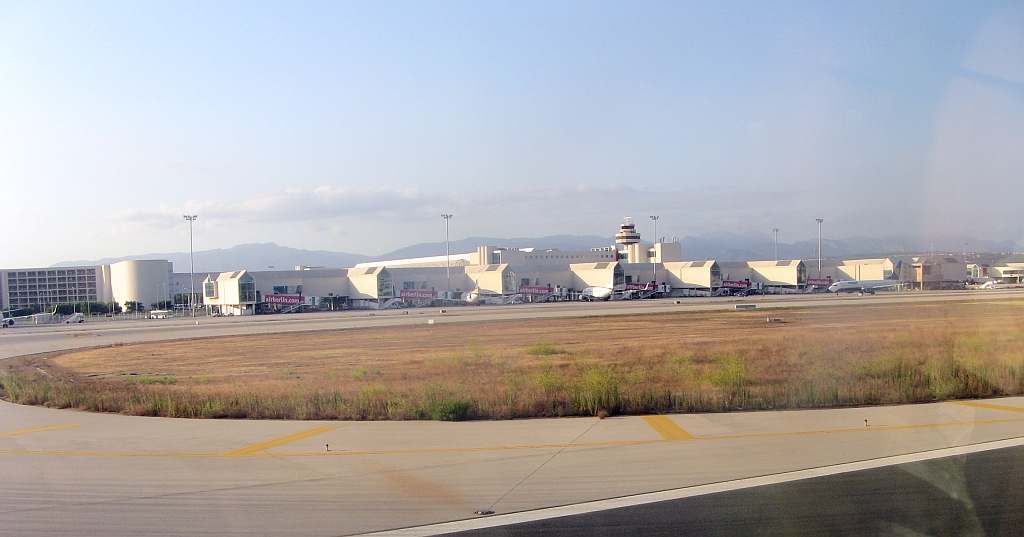
Apron view

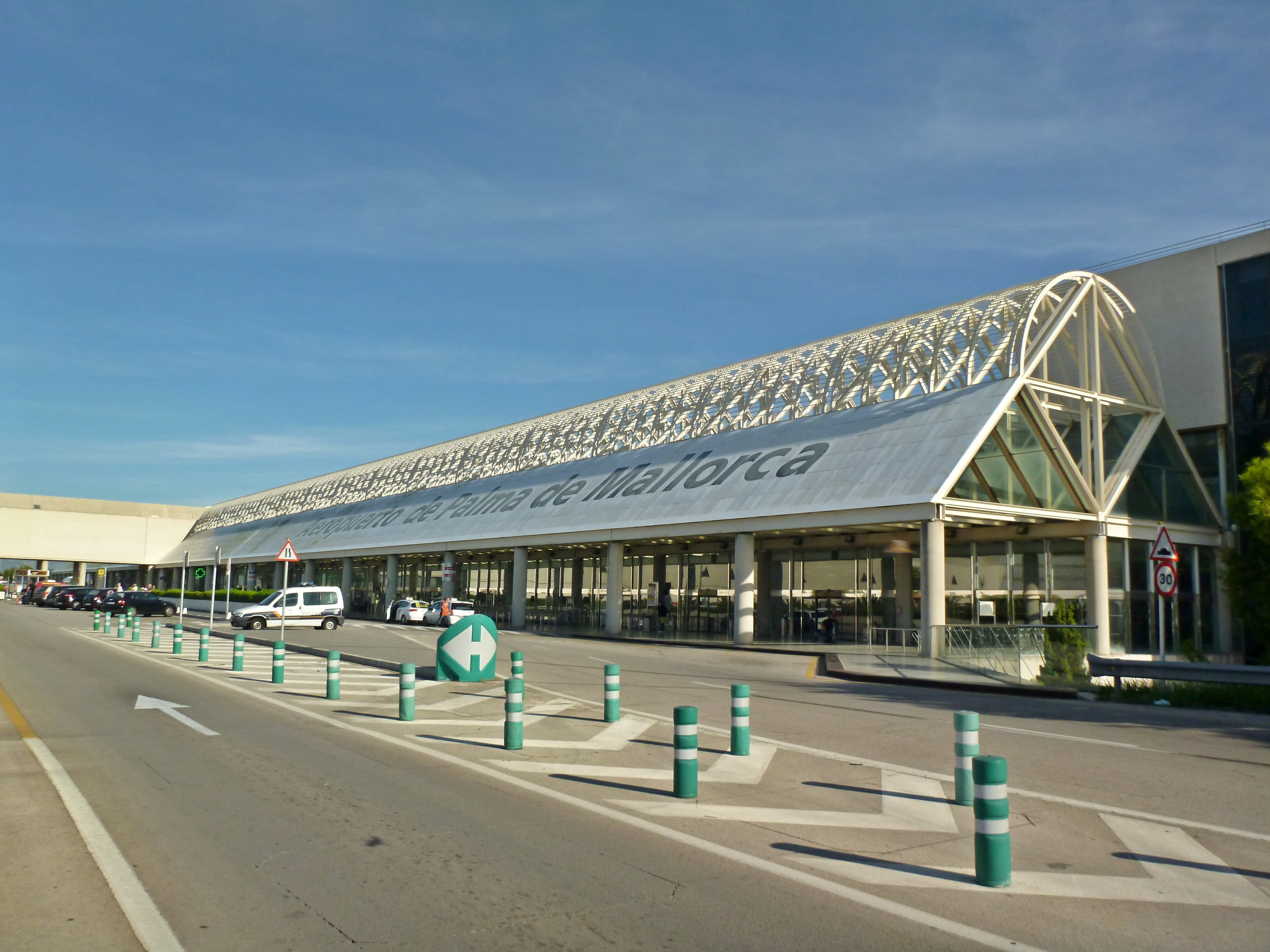
Outside view of the main terminal

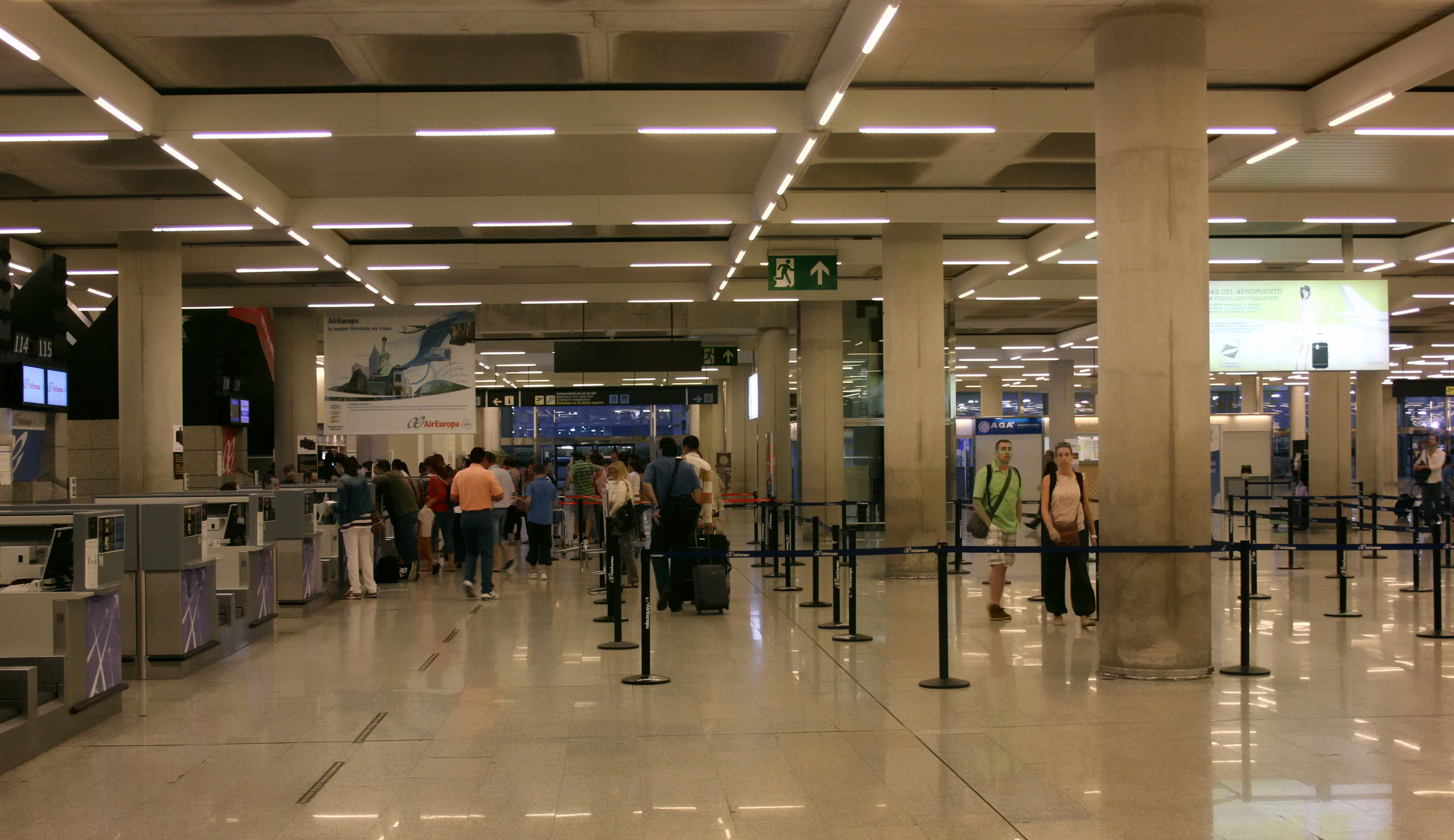
Interior of the terminal

Palma de Mallorca Airport occupies an area of 6.3 km^{2} (2.4 sq mi). Due to rapid growth of passenger numbers, additional infrastructure was added to the two terminals A (1965) and B (1972). This main terminal was designed by local architect Pere Nicolau Bover and was officially opened on 12 April 1997. The airport now consists of four modules: Module A (the former Terminal A Building), Module B (the former Terminal B Building), Module C and Module D (the last two were completely new sets of buildings and gates that opened along with the new central terminal and check in area in 1997). The airport can handle 25 million passengers per year, with a capacity to dispatch 12,000 passengers per hour.

=== Module A ===
The former Terminal A Building is located in the north of the airport and has blue signs. It has 28 gates eight of which have airbridges. This is the only module that has double airbridges attached to gates. The Pier is mainly used by flights to non-Schengen destinations, including the UK and Ireland. This part of the terminal building used to be closed during winter months and is only used in the summer. For winter 2018/2019 it remained open.

=== Module B ===
The former Terminal B Building is the smallest module, located in the north east and has green signs. It has eight gates located on the ground floor, none of which have airbridges. It is used by regional aircraft of Air Nostrum.

=== Module C ===
The largest of the modules located in the east and has purple signs. It has 33 gates, nine of which have airbridges. It is used mainly by Eurowings and Condor along with EasyJet and Norwegian Air Shuttle flights to Schengen destinations. The southern area of the module was worked on and reopened in May 2010. The refurbishment and expansion is so that the module can handle more flights, and to improve ways to get into the pier as it is the longest walk from security control. There will also be a further eight gates with airbridges, but there will still be 33 in total.

=== Module D ===
This is located in the south and has orange signs. It has 19 gates of which 10 have airbridges. All odd numbered gates are gates with a bus transfer. During the closure of the southern area of Module C, it was used mainly for flights to Europe.

On 4 November 2025, Module D closed for roof renovations and an interior refurbishment. It is planned to reopen in April 2026.

== Other facilities ==
Previously Spanair (1986–2012) had its head office in the Spanair Building on the airport property. Both Futura International Airways and Iberworld had large operational offices on the premises of the airport but these are no longer in use.

== Airlines and destinations ==
=== Passenger ===
The following airlines operate regular scheduled and charter flights at Palma de Mallorca Airport:

Airlines	Destinations
Aegean Airlines	Seasonal: Athens
Aer Lingus	Seasonal: Cork, Dublin
Aeroitalia	Seasonal: Salerno
Air Algérie	Algiers
Air Arabia	Nador
Air Canada	Seasonal: Montréal–Trudeau
Air Europa	Alicante, Barcelona, Bilbao, Granada, Madrid, Valencia; Seasonal: Málaga, Paris-Orly
Air France	Seasonal: Paris–Charles de Gaulle
Air Nostrum	Seasonal charter: Bergamo, Bologna, Bratislava, Erfurt-Weimar, Porto
Air Serbia	Seasonal: Belgrade
airBaltic	Seasonal: Riga
Airseven	Seasonal charter: Karup/Midtjylland
AlbaStar	Seasonal charter: Craiova, Iași, Oradea, Sibiu
Animawings	Seasonal: Bucharest–Otopeni, Iași, Timișoara
Atlantic Airways	Seasonal: Vagar
Austrian Airlines	Vienna
Binter Canarias	Gran Canaria, Tenerife–North
British Airways	London–City, London-Gatwick; Seasonal: Edinburgh, Glasgow, London-Heathrow; Seasonal charter: Belfast–City, Guernsey, Isle of Man, Jersey
Brussels Airlines	Seasonal: Brussels
Bulgaria Air	Seasonal: Sofia
Chair Airlines	Zurich
Condor	Frankfurt; Seasonal: Basel/Mulhouse, Dortmund, Düsseldorf, Hamburg, Munich, Münster/Osnabrück, Stuttgart, Zurich
Corendon Airlines	Seasonal: Düsseldorf, Hannover, Nuremberg
Discover Airlines	Frankfurt, Munich
easyJet	Amsterdam, Basel/Mulhouse, Berlin, Birmingham, Bristol, Geneva, London-Gatwick, London-Luton, London–Southend, Manchester, Milan-Malpensa, Zurich; Seasonal: Aberdeen (begins 3 May 2027), Athens, Belfast–City, Belfast–International, Bordeaux, Edinburgh, Glasgow, Lille, Lisbon, Liverpool, Lyon, Milan–Linate, Montpellier, Nantes, Naples, Newcastle, Nice, Palermo, Paris-Charles de Gaulle, Porto, Southampton, Strasbourg, Toulouse
Edelweiss Air	Zurich
Enter Air	Seasonal charter: Bydgoszcz, Gdańsk, Katowice, Poznań, Rzeszów, Warsaw–Chopin, Wrocław
Etihad Airways	Seasonal: Abu Dhabi
Eurowings	Berlin, Cologne/Bonn, Dortmund, Düsseldorf, Hamburg, Hannover, Munich, Stuttgart; Seasonal: Basel/Mulhouse, Bremen, Dresden, Erfurt-Weimar, Graz, Innsbruck, Karlsruhe/Baden-Baden, Leipzig/Halle, Linz, Münster/Osnabrück, Nuremberg, Paderborn/Lippstadt, Prague, Saarbrücken, Salzburg, Zurich
Finnair	Seasonal: Helsinki
FlyOne	Seasonal: Chișinău, Yerevan (begins 1 June 2027)
Helvetic Airways	Seasonal: Bern, Sion
Iberia	Almería, Andorra/La Seu d'Urgell (ends 27 December 2026), Ibiza, León, Lleida, Melilla, Menorca, Valencia; Seasonal: Badajoz, Castellón, Girona, Logroño, Nice, Reus, Valladolid, Vigo
Iberia Express	Madrid
ITA Airways	Seasonal: Milan-Linate, Rome–Fiumicino
Jet2.com	Seasonal: Belfast-International, Birmingham, Bristol, Bournemouth, East Midlands, Edinburgh, Glasgow, Leeds/Bradford, Liverpool, London–Gatwick, London–Luton, London–Stansted, Manchester, Newcastle Upon Tyne
LEAV Aviation	Seasonal: Cologne/Bonn, Frankfurt, Münster/Osnabrück
LOT Polish Airlines	Seasonal: Warsaw–Chopin; Seasonal charter: Katowice, Poznań
Lufthansa	Frankfurt, Munich
Lufthansa City Airlines	Munich
Luxair	Luxembourg
Marabu	Seasonal: Hamburg, Leipzig/Halle, Nuremberg
Neos	Seasonal: Milan–Malpensa, Verona
Norwegian Air Shuttle	Seasonal: Aalborg, Aarhus, Bergen, Billund, Copenhagen, Gothenburg, Harstad/Narvik, Helsinki, Oslo, Sandefjord, Stavanger, Stockholm–Arlanda, Stockholm–Skavsta; Seasonal charter: Oslo
Ryanair	Barcelona, Bergamo, Berlin, Birmingham, Bremen (ends 27 March 2027), Bologna, Charleroi, Cologne/Bonn, Eindhoven, Hahn, Friedrichshafen, Hamburg, Karlsruhe/Baden-Baden, London-Stansted, Lübeck, Madrid, Málaga, Malta, Manchester, Memmingen, Milan-Malpensa, Münster/Osnabrück, Nuremberg, Seville, Stockholm-Arlanda, Treviso, Valencia, Vienna, Warsaw–Chopin, Weeze; Seasonal: Aarhus, Alicante, Beauvais, Belfast–International, Bournemouth, Bratislava, Bristol, Bucharest–Otopeni, Budapest, Cagliari, Copenhagen, Cork, Dublin, East Midlands, Edinburgh, Exeter, Friedrichshafen, Gdańsk, Glasgow–Prestwick, Gothenburg, Kassel (begins 31 March 2027), Kaunas, Klagenfurt, Knock, Kraków, Leeds/Bradford, Liverpool, London–Luton, Luxembourg, Marrakesh, Marseille, Naples, Newcastle upon Tyne, Paderborn/Lippstadt, Pardubice, Pisa, Porto, Poznań, Prague, Rome-Fiumicino, Shannon, Sofia, Teesside, Toulouse, Verona, Vitoria, Warsaw–Modlin, Wrocław, Zagreb, Zaragoza
Scandinavian Airlines	Copenhagen, Stockholm-Arlanda; Seasonal: Göteborg, Oslo
SkyUp Airlines	Seasonal: Chișinău
Smartwings	Prague; Seasonal: Bratislava, Košice; Seasonal charter: Brno, České Budějovice, Ostrava, Pardubice
Sunclass Airlines	Seasonal charter: Aalborg, Bergen, Billund, Bornholm, Copenhagen, Göteborg, Haugesund, Helsinki, Jönköping, Kalmar, Karlstad, Kristiansand, Malmö, Odense, Örebro, Oslo, Östersund, Stavanger, Stockholm-Arlanda, Trondheim, Visby
Sundair	Seasonal: Bremen, Dresden, Hamburg, Leipzig/Halle
Swiss International Air Lines	Seasonal: Geneva, Zurich
TAP Air Portugal	Seasonal: Lisbon
Transavia	Amsterdam, Lyon, Paris-Orly; Seasonal: Eindhoven, Nantes, Rotterdam/The Hague
TUI Airways	Seasonal: Aberdeen, Belfast–International, Birmingham, Bournemouth, Bristol, Cardiff, Cork (begins 18 May 2027), Exeter, Glasgow, Humberside, Inverness, Leeds/Bradford, London-Gatwick, London–Luton, London–Stansted, Newcastle upon Tyne, Norwich, Teesside
TUI fly Belgium	Seasonal: Antwerp, Brussels, Ostend/Bruges
TUI fly Deutschland	Düsseldorf, Frankfurt, Hannover, Stuttgart
TUI fly Netherlands	Seasonal: Amsterdam
United Airlines	Seasonal: Newark
Volotea	Seasonal: Asturias, Bilbao, Bordeaux, Brest, Deauville, Lille, Limoges, Lyon, Marseille, Nantes, Salamanca, San Sebastián, Strasbourg
Vueling	Alicante, Asturias, Barcelona, Bilbao, Granada, Jerez de la Frontera, Málaga, Paris-Orly, Santander, Santiago de Compostela, Seville, Valencia, Zaragoza; Seasonal: Brussels, Lisbon, Nantes, Zurich
Wizz Air	Madrid, Valencia (begins 14 December 2026); Seasonal: Budapest, Cluj-Napoca, Gdańsk, London–Luton, Milan–Malpensa, Naples, Rome–Fiumicino, Sofia, Tirana, Warsaw–Chopin

=== Cargo ===
Airlines	Destinations
Swiftair	Barcelona, Ibiza, Madrid, Menorca

== Statistics ==
=== Annual traffic ===
Traffic by calendar year
	Passengers	Movements	Cargo (kilos)
2000	19,424,243	176,997	25,156,479
2001	19,206,964	169,603	23,068,964
2002	17,832,558	160,329	20,412,784
2003	19,185,919	168,988	19,935,677
2004	20,416,083	177,859	20,408,137
2005	21,240,736	182,028	21,025,694
2006	22,408,427	190,304	22,443,596
2007	23,228,879	197,384	22,833,556
2008	22,832,857	193,379	21,395,791
2009	21,203,041	177,502	17,086,478
2010	21,117,417	174,635	17,292,240
2011	22,726,707	180,152	15,777,101
2012	22,666,858	173,966	13,712,034
2013	22,768,032	170,140	12,236,854
2014	23,115,622	172,630	11,462,907
2015	23,745,023	178,254	11,373,639
2016	26,254,110	197,640	10,452,860
2017	27,950,655	208,787	10,191,236
2018	29,081,787	220,329	10,018,045
2019	29,721,123	217,218	9,021,606
2020	6,108,486	76,851	6,732,880
2021	14.496.857	141.189	6.754.791
2022	28.573.364	220.690	7.592.108
2023	31.105.987	228.920	7.184.352
2024	33.298.164	243.200	6.756.472
2025	33,806,427	246,486	5,836,421
Source: Aena Statistics

=== Busiest routes ===
Busiest international routes from PMI (2025)
Rank	Destination	Passengers	Change 2024/25
1	Düsseldorf	1.352.905	▼ -1,9%
2	Cologne/Bonn	984.655	▲0,7%
3	Frankfurt	951.179	▼ -1,5%
4	Berlin	917.509	▲5,4%
5	Hamburg	839.035	▼ -14,5%
6	Zurich	749.879	▲3,3%
7	Manchester	749.168	▼ -2,9%
8	Munich	745.364	▼ -2,7%
9	London-Gatwick	683.797	▼ -5,7%
10	Stuttgart	648.814	▲2,6%
11	Vienna	582.548	▲7,7%
12	Bristol	483.736	▲0,9%
13	Birmingham	468.983	▲3,6%
14	Hannover	465.440	▲0,4%
15	London-Stansted	458.641	▼ -3,4%
16	Nuremberg	443.272	▲0,4%
17	Amsterdam	435.296	▲9,2%
18	Paris-Orly	434.802	▲5,4%
19	London-Luton	428.486	▲19,3%
20	Karlsruhe/Baden-Baden	375.404	▲14,4%
Source: Estadísticas de tráfico aereo

Busiest intercontinental routes from PMI (2025)
Rank	Destination	Passengers	Change 2024/25
1	Newark	32.107	▲47,3%
2	Nador	25.381	▲9,4%
3	Marrakesh	19.908	▲2,5%
4	Fès	18.417	▲7,6%
5	Algiers	12.885	▲0,7%
Source: Estadísticas de tráfico aereo

Busiest domestic routes from PMI (2025)
Rank	Destination	Passengers	Change 2024/25
1	Barcelona	2.387.129	▲2,8%
2	Madrid	2.221.374	▲0,7%
3	Valencia	661.960	▼ -7,9%
4	Ibiza	565.221	▼ -2,5%
5	Seville	496.544	▼ -5,7%
6	Alicante	436.282	▼ -11,9%
7	Málaga	402.871	▲5,6%
8	Menorca	385.796	▼ -5,2%
9	Bilbao	313.230	▼ -0,1%
10	Santiago de Compostela	255.171	▲3,2%
11	Granada	202.775	▲9,4%
12	Zaragoza	147.380	▲3,3%
13	Asturias	144.443	▲20,5%
14	Gran Canaria	63.194	▼ -22,7%
15	Jerez de la Frontera	61.835	▼ -24,8%
16	Tenerife North	54.147	▲53,1%
17	Vitoria	30.963	▲5,5%
18	Santander	30.350	▲15,0%
19	León	19.191	▲14,8%
20	Vigo	18.848	▲11,9%
Source: Estadísticas de tráfico aereo

=== Passengers by airline ===
Passengers by airline at PMI (2023)
Rank	Airline	Share	Passengers	Change 2022/23
1	Ryanair	25,9%	8,042,745	▲10%
2	Eurowings	12,8%	3,990,754	▲8%
3	Vueling	10,4%	3,230,963	▲11%
4	EasyJet	8,1%	2,527,009	▲8%
5	Air Europa	5,9%	1,832,489	▲4%
6	Iberia	5,5%	1,718,324	▲14%
7	Condor	5,1%	1,592,680	▲7%
8	Jet2.com	4,2%	1,298,203	▲13%
9	TUI Airways	2,8%	862,954	▲1%
10	Transavia	1,6%	497,472	▲12%
11	TUI fly Deutschland	1,5%	456,630	▲3%
12	Swiss International Air Lines	1,3%	393,669	▲18%
13	British Airways	1,3%	369,096	▲22%
14	Norwegian	1,1%	352,788	▲12%
15	Lufthansa	1,1%	343,426	▼27%
Source: Estadísticas de tráfico aereo

== Accidents and incidents ==
- On 4 January 1991, Douglas DC-3 EC-EQH of Aeromarket Express overran the runway on a cargo flight to Menorca Airport and was damaged beyond repair.
- On 8 March 1993, Douglas C-47A EC-FAH of Aeromarket Express crashed on take-off while on a cargo flight to Madrid–Barajas Airport. Both crew were killed.
- On 12 April 2002 Tadair Flight 306 operated by a Fairchild Swearingen Metroliner EC-GKR a cargo flight from Madrid–Barajas Airport to Palma de Mallorca. Flight 306 crashed on landing on runway 24L, killing both pilots.
- In June 2024, sudden floods shut down the airport. The water damaged the runways and terminal building.
- On 5 July 2025, Ryanair Flight 2484 to Manchester experienced a false fire alert while taxiing for take off which caused panic among the passengers with some attempting to evacuate the aircraft. 18 individuals sustained light injuries.

== See also ==
- ENAIRE
