= Air Nostrum =

Regional airline of Spain

Air Nostrum Iberia Regional Air Nostrum Líneas Aéreas del Mediterráneo, S.A.

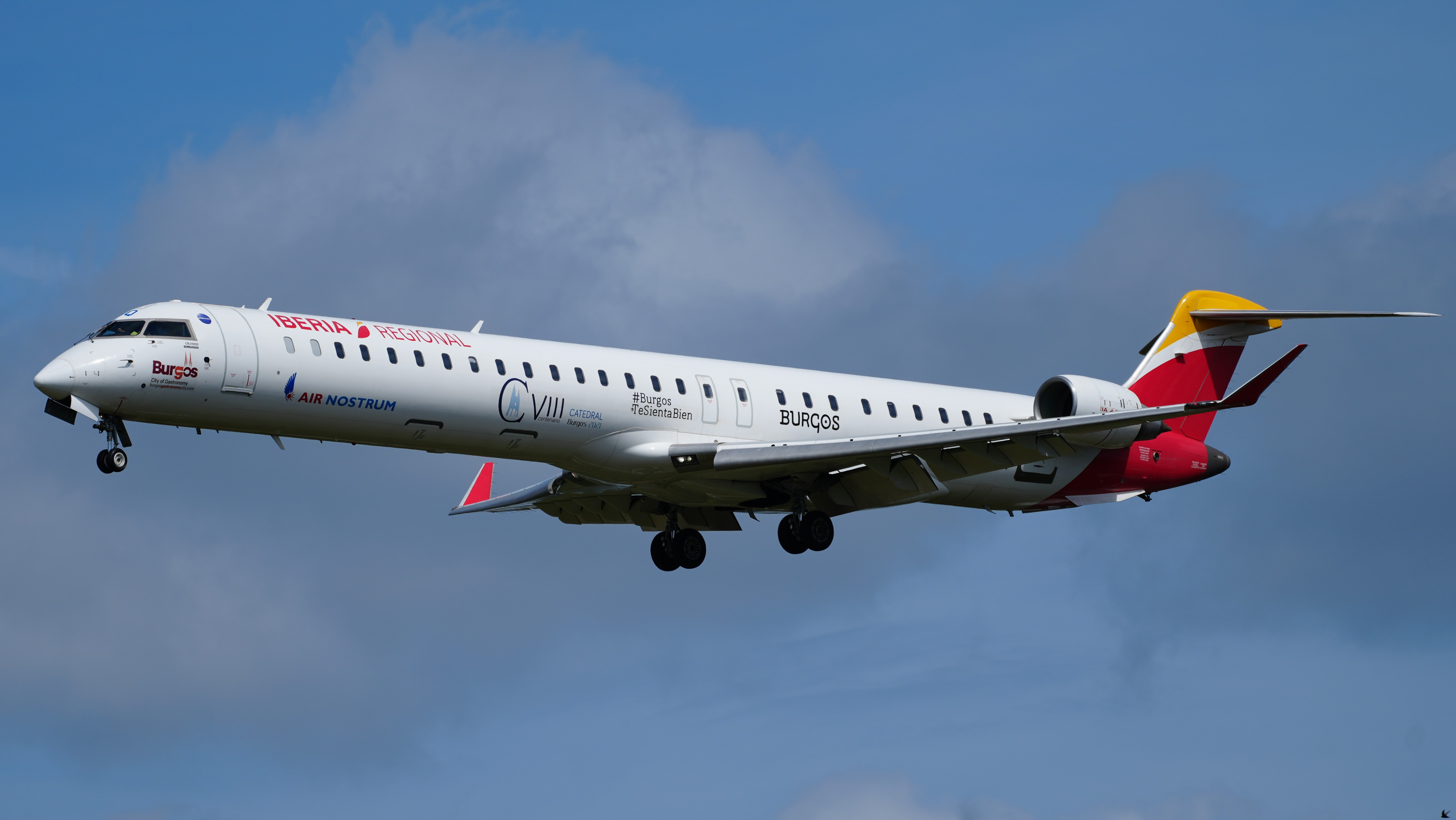
- Air Nostrum CRJ1000, operated for Iberia Regional
IATA	ICAO	Call sign
YW	ANE	AIR NOSTRUM
- Founded: 23 May 1994; 32 years ago
- AOC #: ES.AOC.002
- Hubs: Barcelona; Madrid; Valencia
- Frequent-flyer program: Avios
- Alliance: Oneworld (affiliate)
- Fleet size: 40
- Destinations: 70
- Parent company: Strategic Alliance of Regional Airlines (SARA)
- Traded as: Iberia Regional
- Headquarters: Valencia, Valencian Community, Spain
- Revenue: €494 million (2022)
- Employees: 1,450 (2023)
- Website: www.airnostrum.com

Air Nostrum (doing business as Iberia Regional) is a Spanish regional airline based in Valencia that merged with CityJet in 2023, forming the region's largest aviation holding company, Strategic Alliance of Regional Airlines (SARA).

An affiliate member of the Oneworld airline alliance, it operates 91 domestic and international routes to 51 destinations, and charter flights. Its main base is Valencia Airport, with hubs at Barcelona–El Prat Airport, Madrid–Barajas Airport and Palma de Mallorca airport.

Limited operations are also carried out on behalf of Brussels Airlines, replacing related wet-lease specialist airline CityJet, having begun in late 2018. Air Nostrum is also a part owner of Iryo, a Spanish high-speed rail service which began operating in November 2022.

== History ==
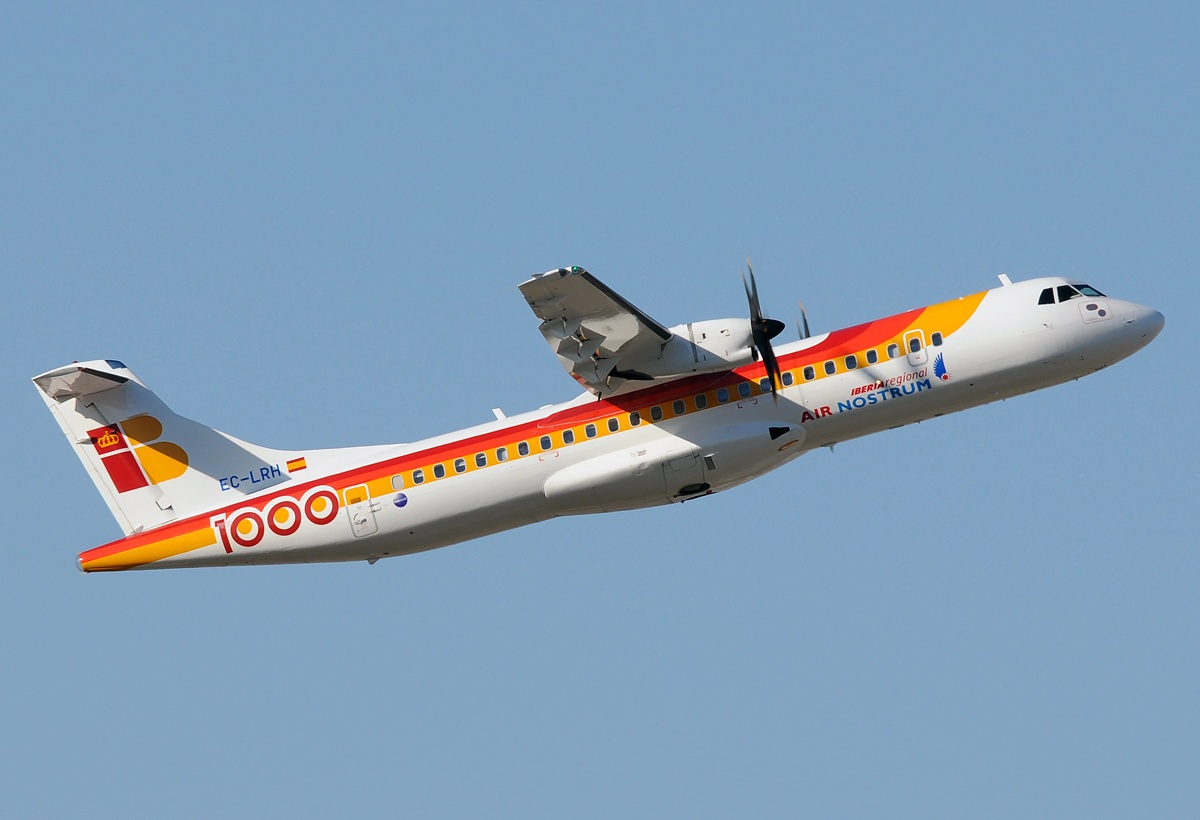
Air Nostrum ATR 72-600 in the former livery, with special titles celebrating it as the 1000th aircraft built by ATR

The airline was established on 23 May 1994 and started operations on 15 December. It used to offer a comprehensive meal service on all scheduled flights.

In early 2008, the airline eliminated its 'regional business class' cabin. The cabin is now split into separate business and economy sections along the lines of other major airlines. Economy passengers can purchase drinks and snacks from an onboard menu.

On February 7, 2012, Air Nostrum presented an ERE (a legal form of workforce reduction and redundancies) that will affect its 1,800 workers for two years, due to the increase in fuel prices and the drop in income. It is estimated that during the two years, 15 Bombardier CRJ200 aircraft will be grounded and most of its routes will be abandoned at a loss.

On March 31, 2014, the airline announced the entry into the company's capital of a group of Valencian businessmen with the participation of the then CEO of the company, Carlos Bertomeu, as well as Antonio Pellicer and José Remohí, owners of the IVI, with an estimated capital of 25 million euros, divided between capital and debt.

In September 2017, it filed an application to operate high speed rail services from Madrid Atocha to Gare de Montpellier-Saint-Roch in Southern France from 5 October 2018 with Class 100 trains leased from Renfe. Approval to operate the services was granted by the Comisión Nacional de los Mercados y la Competencia in September 2018, however never commenced after the lease on the Class 100s was blocked.

On 17 July 2018, Air Nostrum and CityJet of Ireland announced they would merge to form the largest regional airline in Europe, however will remain as separate brands.

In June 2022, it was announced that Air Nostrum had placed a reservation on ten Hybrid Air Vehicles Airlander 10 airships. Introduction to service is scheduled for 2026. In August 2023, Air Nostrum doubled their reservation from ten to twenty HAV Airlander 10 aircraft.

In October 2023, Air Nostrum completed its merger with CityJet. Air Nostrum shareholders acquired a controlling 80% interest in the entity created from the merger, Strategic Alliance of Regional Airlines (SARA).

== Fleet ==
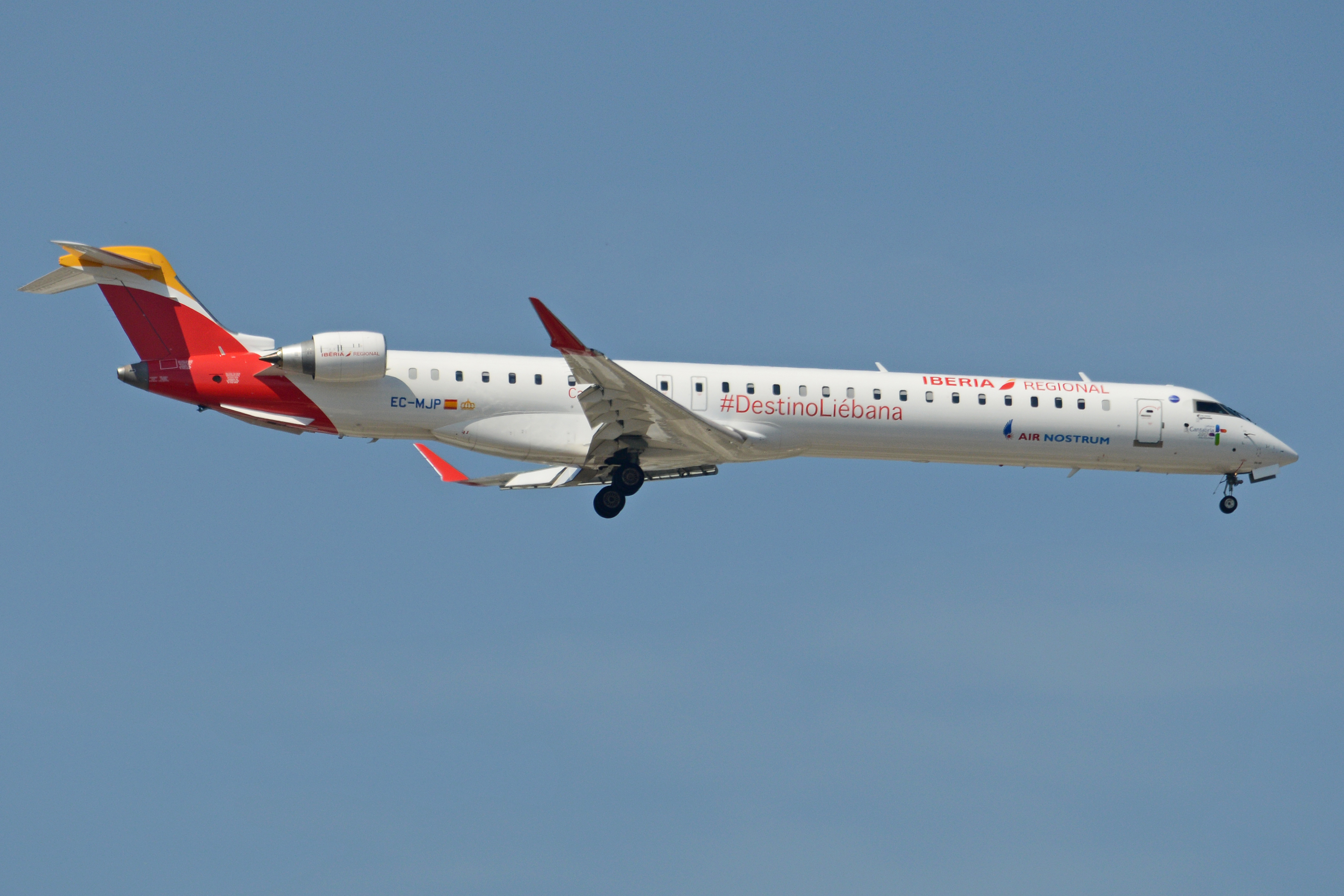
Air Nostrum Bombardier CRJ1000

As of August 2025, Air Nostrum operates the following aircraft:

Aircraft	In service	Orders	Passengers	Notes
ATR 72-600	12	—	72	
Bombardier CRJ200ER	0	—	50	
Bombardier CRJ1000	30	—	100	
Airlander 10	—	20	100	Launch customer. Deliveries from 2027.
Total	40	20		

== Incidents and accidents ==
- On 17 January 2003, an Air Nostrum Fokker 50 overran the runway at Melilla Airport and crashed into the perimeter fence resulting in the aircraft splitting into two major parts. Nine passengers were injured.
- On 24 January 2006, Air Nostrum flight IB 8665 from Valladolid made a belly landing at Barcelona El Prat Airport. Two of the forty passengers sustained minor injuries while disembarking from the aircraft, a Bombardier CRJ200 with registration EC-IBM. The cause was determined by the Comisión de Investigación de Accidentes e Incidentes de Aviación Civil to be pilot error.
