= List of airports in Spain =

Airport list in Spain

Airports in Spain

This is a list of airports in Spain, sorted by location.

== Airports in Peninsular Spain ==
Location served	Community	ICAO	IATA	Other	Airport name
Public airports					
A Coruña	Galicia	LECO	LCG		A Coruña Airport (Alvedro Airport)
Algeciras	Andalusia	LEAG			Algeciras Heliport
Albacete	Castile-La Mancha	LEAB	ABC		Albacete Airport (Los Llanos Air Base)
Alicante	Valencia	LEAL	ALC		Alicante-Elche Airport (formerly El Altet Airport)
Almería	Andalusia	LEAM	LEI		Almería Airport
Asturias	Asturias	LEAS	OVD		Asturias Airport
Badajoz	Extremadura	LEBZ	BJZ		Badajoz Airport (Talavera la Real Badajoz Airport)
Barcelona (El Prat)	Catalonia	LEBL	BCN		Barcelona–El Prat Airport
Bilbao, Biscay	Basque Country	LEBB	BIO		Bilbao Airport
Burgos	Castile and León	LEBG	RGS		Burgos Airport
Castellón	Valencia	LECH	CDT		Castellón–Costa Azahar Airport
Córdoba	Andalusia	LEBA	ODB		Córdoba Airport
Girona	Catalonia	LEGE	GRO		Girona–Costa Brava Airport
Granada / Jaén	Andalusia	LEGR	GRX		Federico García Lorca Airport
Huesca	Aragon	LEHC	HSK		Huesca-Pirineos Airport
Jerez de la Frontera, Cádiz	Andalusia	LEJR	XRY		Jerez Airport
La Seu d'Urgell / Andorra	Catalonia	LESU	LEU		Andorra–La Seu d'Urgell Airport
León	Castile and León	LELN	LEN		León Airport
Lleida	Catalonia	LEDA	ILD		Lleida-Alguaire Airport
Logroño	La Rioja	LELO	RJL		Logroño-Agoncillo Airport
Madrid	Madrid	LEMD	MAD		Madrid–Barajas Airport
Madrid	Madrid	LECU			Madrid-Cuatro Vientos Airport
Madrid	Madrid	LETO	TOJ		Madrid-Torrejón Airport
Málaga	Andalusia	LEMG	AGP		Málaga Airport
Pamplona	Navarre	LEPP	PNA		Pamplona-Nóain Airport
Region of Murcia	Region of Murcia	LEMI	RMU		Región de Murcia International Airport
Reus, Tarragona	Catalonia	LERS	REU		Reus Airport
Sabadell	Catalonia	LELL		QSA	Sabadell Airport
Salamanca	Castile and León	LESA	SLM		Salamanca Airport (Matacan Air Base)
San Sebastián, Gipuzkoa	Basque Country	LESO	EAS		San Sebastián Airport (Fuenterrabia Airport)
Santander	Cantabria	LEXJ	SDR		Santander Airport (Parayas Airport)
Santiago de Compostela	Galicia	LEST	SCQ		Santiago de Compostela Airport (Lavacolla Airport) [santiago]
Seville (Sevilla)	Andalusia	LEZL	SVQ		Seville Airport (San Pablo Airport)
Teruel	Aragon	LETL	TEV		Teruel Airport
Valencia	Valencia	LEVC	VLC		Valencia Airport
Valladolid / Villanubla	Castile and León	LEVD	VLL		Valladolid Airport (Villanubla Airport)
Vigo	Galicia	LEVX	VGO		Vigo-Peinador Airport
Vitoria-Gasteiz / Foronda	Basque Country	LEVT	VIT		Vitoria Airport (Foronda Airport)
Zaragoza	Aragon	LEZG	ZAZ		Zaragoza Airport
Military airports					
Alcantarilla	Region of Murcia	LERI			Alcantarilla Air Base
Dos Hermanas / Seville	Andalusia	LEEC			El Copero Military Base
Granada	Andalusia	LEGA	GRX		Armilla Air Base
León	Castile and León	LELN	LEN		León Air Base
Madrid	Madrid	LEGT			Getafe Air Base
Morón de la Frontera / Seville	Andalusia	LEMO	OZP		Morón Air Base
Murcia / San Javier	Region of Murcia	LELC	MJV		San Javier Air Base
Rota	Andalusia	LERT	ROZ		Rota Naval Air Base
Salamanca	Castile and León	LESA	SLM		Matacan Air Base (Matacan Air Base)
Santiago de Compostela	Galicia	LEST	SCQ		Santiago de Compostela Military Airport
Valladolid / Villanubla	Castile and León	LEVD	VLL		Villanubla Air Base

== Airports in the Balearic Islands ==
Location	ICAO	IATA	Airport name
Ibiza	LEIB	IBZ	Ibiza Airport
Mallorca	LEPA	PMI	Palma de Mallorca Airport (Son Sant Joan Airport)
Mallorca	LEPO		Pollença Seaplane Base
Mallorca	LESB		Son Bonet Airport
Menorca	LEMH	MAH	Menorca Airport
Menorca	LESL		San Luis Aerodrome

== Airports in the Canary Islands ==
=== Airports ===
Location	ICAO	IATA	Airport name
El Hierro	GCHI	VDE	El Hierro Airport
Fuerteventura	GCFV	FUE	Fuerteventura Airport (El Matorral Airport)
Fuerteventura			Aeródromo del Jarde (Antigua)
Gran Canaria	GCLP	LPA	Gran Canaria Airport (Las Palmas)
Gran Canaria	GCLB		El Berriel Aerodrome
La Gomera	GCGM	GMZ	La Gomera Airport
La Gomera			El Revolcadero
La Palma	GCLA	SPC	La Palma Airport
Lanzarote	GCRR	ACE	Lanzarote Airport (Arrecife Airport)
Tenerife	GCXO	TFN	Tenerife North Airport (Los Rodeos Airport)
Tenerife	GCTS	TFS	Tenerife South Airport (Reina Sofía Airport)

=== Heliports ===
Location	ICAO	IATA	Heliport name
La Gomera	GCGO		San Sebastián De La Gomera Heliport
Tenerife	GCHU		Hospital Universitario De Canarias Heliport (Santa Cruz de Tenerife)

== Airports in Ceuta and Melilla ==
Location	ICAO	IATA	Airport name
Ceuta	GECE		Ceuta Heliport
Melilla	GEML	MLN	Melilla Airport

== Spain's busiest airports (2016) ==
Rank	Airport	Location	Code	Total passengers	% change 2015-2016	Aircraft movements	Cargo traffic
1.	Madrid Airport	Madrid	MAD	50,420,583	▲7.7	378,150	415,773,807
2.	Barcelona Airport	Barcelona	BCN	44,154,693	▲11.2	307,864	132,754,964
3.	Palma de Mallorca Airport	Palma de Mallorca	PMI	26,253,882	▲10.6	197,639	10,452,860
4.	Málaga Airport	Málaga	AGP	16,672,776	▲15.7	123,700	2,287,656
5.	Alicante Airport	Alicante	ALC	12,344,945	▲16.7	87,113	5,461,457
6.	Gran Canaria Airport	Las Palmas / Gran Canaria	LPA	12,093,645	▲13.8	111,996	18,587,918
7.	Tenerife South Airport	Tenerife	TFS	10,472,404	▲14.9	65,881	2,809,261
8.	Ibiza Airport	Ibiza	IBZ	7,416,368	▲14.5	72,503	1,831,440
9.	Lanzarote Airport	Lanzarote	ACE	6,683,966	▲9.1	54,632	1,776,502
10.	Valencia Airport	Valencia	VLC	5,799,104	▲14.7	62,798	12,580,692

== See also ==
- Enaire (national entity)
- List of ports in Spain
- Transport in Spain
- List of airports by ICAO code: L#LE – Spain
- List of airports by ICAO code: G#GC - Canary Islands (Spain)
- List of airports by ICAO code: G#GE - Ceuta and Melilla (Spain)
- Wikipedia: WikiProject Aviation/Airline destination lists: Europe#Spain
