= Villatuelda =

Coordinates: 41°49′N 3°53′W

Villatuelda, Spain
- village and municipality
- Nickname: Villatueldanos/as
- Interactive map of Villatuelda, Spain
- Municipality: Villatuelda

Government
  - Mayor: Ausencio Monge (PP)

Area
  - Total: 15.30 km^{2} (5.91 sq mi)
  - Land: 15.30 km^{2} (5.91 sq mi)

Population (2025-01-01)
  - Total: 41
  - Density: 2.7/km^{2} (6.9/sq mi)
- Time zone: UTC+1 (CET)
  - Summer (DST): UTC+2 (CEST)
- Website: City of Villatuelda

Villatuelda is a Spanish village and municipality in the province of Burgos, part of the autonomous community of Castile and León. It has a population of approximately 60 people and it is 30 km from Aranda de Duero.

Villatuelda is in the wine region of Ribera del Duero. The village is crossed by the Esgueva River.

The post code for the town is 09310. Airports: Burgos and Valladolid.

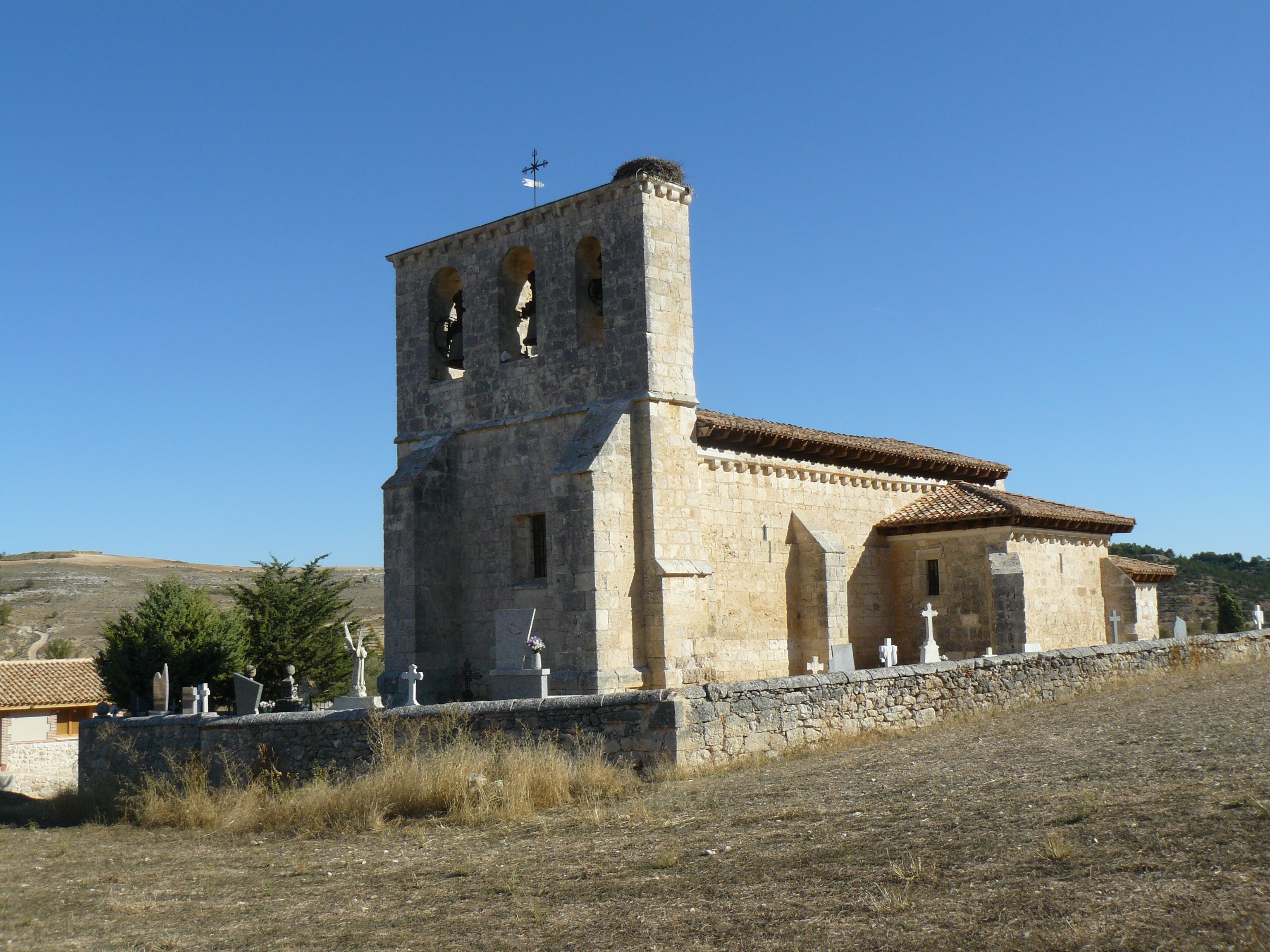
Church of Villatuelda

== Sources and external links ==
- Map
