= Operation Mars (Portugal) =

- Part of Mozambican War of Independence
Date	1–10 April 1968
Location	Niassa, Mozambique
Result	Portuguese victory

Belligerents
Portugal	(Mozambique) FRELIMO

Commanders and leaders
(Portugal) Unknown	(Mozambique) Unknown

Units involved
(Portugal) Forças Armadas: Portuguese Army; Portuguese Air Force	Unknown

Strength
19 commandos 1 Do-27 recon plane 1 T-6 trainer	26 guerrillas

Casualties and losses
1 killed	22 killed

Operation Mars was a military operation in the Mozambican War of Independence. The operation consisted of an attack to the Provincial Base Gungunhana, in the region of Niassa, carried out in April 1968, by the 4th Company of Commandos.

This operation originates in an earlier one, Operation Corvo III, in which information was obtained on the location of that base, and on a meeting that would take place there with Frelimo military leaders in Niassa. In total secrecy, Operation Mars was organised whose aim was to surprise these leaders.

In all, the force of attack was constituted by three groups of commandos of 19 men and a group of militias with 26 men. These men followed by air to New Coimbra, arriving on 27 March. They left on the following day, on foot, and arrived on 1 April near Gungunhana Provincial Base; on that same day, two aircraft, one Do 27 and one T-6, departed from Vila Cabral, to bombard the base. After conquering the objective, and of seizing diverse material of war, the commandos returned to the base, on 10 April. In terms of victims of the operation, 22 guerrillas were killed; on the Portuguese side one soldier was killed, an officer killed by a mine.
