= Helicópteros del Sureste =

Spanish helicopter operator

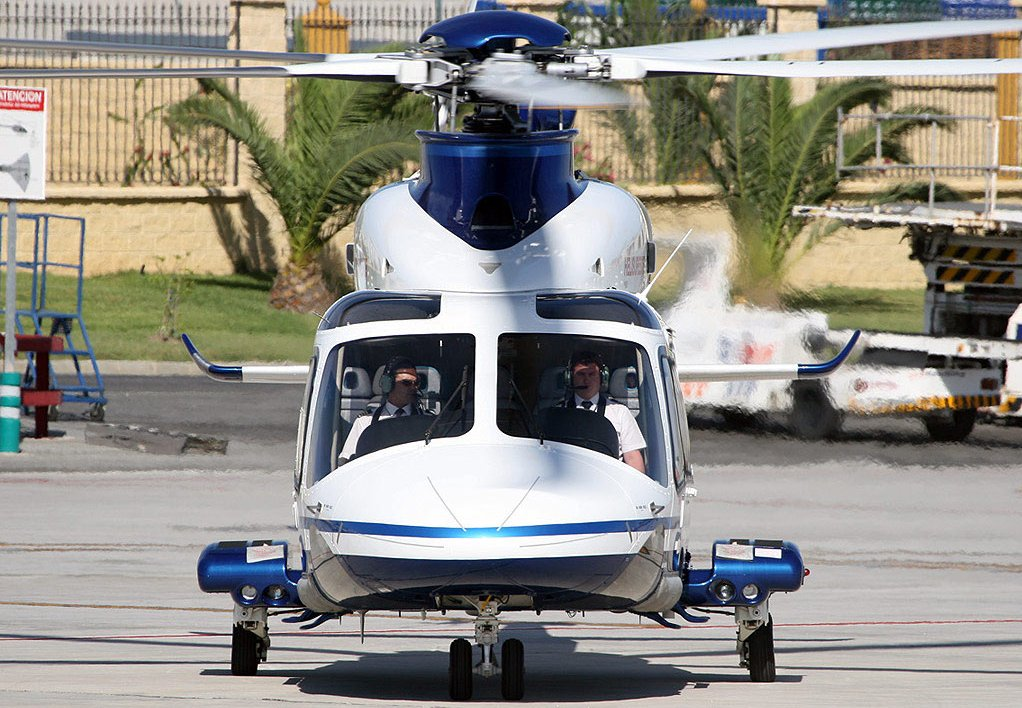
An AgustaWestland AW139 of Helisureste.

Helicópteros del Sureste (English: South East Helicopters) (also called Helisureste) is a helicopter service based in Mutxamel, Alicante, Spain.

== Background ==
Helicópteros del Sureste is currently the primary responsibility of the "On-Shore" division of the INAERgroup.

The company provides a variety of services:

- passenger services
- air ambulance
- civil defense support
- forest firefighting
- aerial photography
- aerial filming

Helicópteros del Sureste obtained a Declaration of Competence to provide scheduled passenger service. Since 1996, they have operated the liner Ceuta-Málaga service from the (Ceuta Heliport and Málaga Airport).

Each year they carry over 20,000 passengers in next-generation aircraft. The company was the first to offer flights from the Algeciras Heliport, providing crucial links through the Strait of Gibraltar. It also runs the Malta-Gozo helilink.

== Destinations ==
- Ceuta
- Algeciras
- Málaga Airport

== Fleet ==
- Agusta A109S
- AgustaWestland AW139
- Bell 412SP
- Bell 206
- Aerospatiale SA 330 Puma
- Kamov Ka-32

== Notable employees ==
The company employed or contracted Mykola Melnyk, a Chernobyl hero helicopter pilot from Ukraine, using his expertise in piloting the Soviet-made Kamov helicopters.
