= Elizalde (automobile) =

Defunct Spanish automobile manufacturer

The Elizalde was a Spanish automobile manufacturer from 1914 until 1928.

Arturo Elizalde Rouvier opened a garage in Barcelona in 1909, and used it to manufacture automobile parts. He and his brother-in-law, Rafael Biada Navarro, were co-managers of the company they had formed with J. M. Vallet y Arnau, under the name Sociedad Mercantil J. M. Vallet y Cia. Vallet provided the company with a workshop at 149 Paseo de San Juan in Barcelona.

Elizalde soon received backing from the Biada brothers, who began building complete cars. The first prototype, called the Tipo 11, made its debut in July 1914. It covered the route between Barcelona, Zaragoza, Guadalajara and Madrid in 13 hours. By 1915, Alfonso XIII owned a 20cv Biada-Elizalde cabriolet Tipo 20. A 25cv sports version of the same car was marketed, with Alfonso's blessing, as the Reine Victoria. It was claimed to be the first Spanish automobile to feature four-wheel brakes. The Reine Victoria was first shown at the Salón del Automóvil de Barcelona of 1919. In 1920, the company announced production of a 19/30 cv model, the Model 29; it would have an ohv 3817 cc four-cylinder engine. Similar models would be built until 1927.

In 1920 Elizalde began production of a 50/60cv straight-eight known as the Tipo 48 - one of the first cars in this configuration to go into production. Its 8143 cc power unit had four valves per cylinder and incorporated a tire pump. This pump doubled as a vacuum cleaner to be used on the car's interior. A 5181 cc straight-eight Gran Sport version of this model, capable of reaching 160 km/h (99 mph), was also offered.

In addition to producing cars, Elizalde built trucks and aircraft engines.

== Aero engines ==
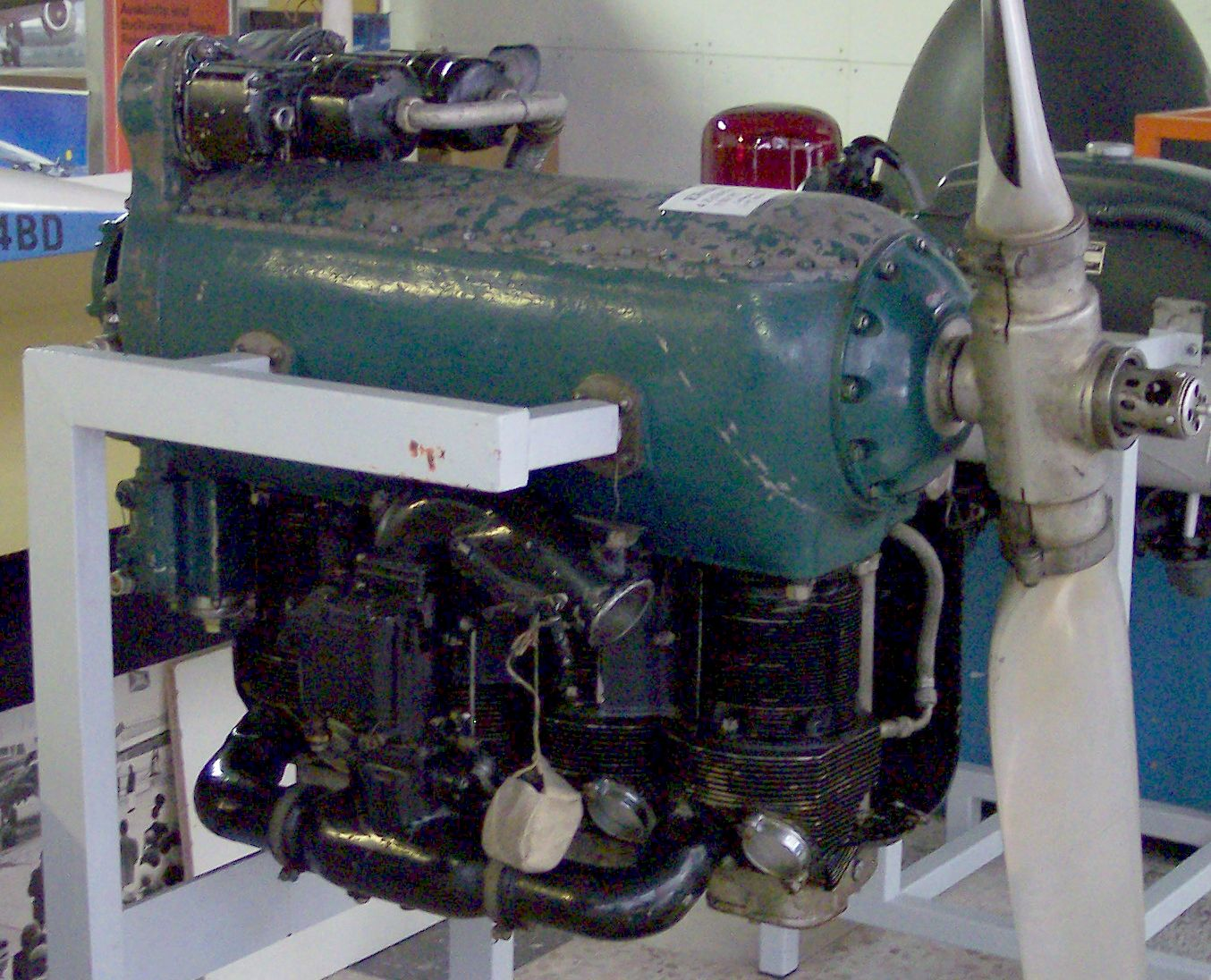
Elizalde Tigre

From 1925 the company produced aero-engines. Initially, they produced French Lorraine engines under license, and just prior to the outbreak of the civil war, it produced two types of air-cooled engines: the Dragon IX and Super-Dragon.

=== Aero engine designs ===
- Elizalde Dragon IX
- Elizalde Super-Dragon
- Elizalde Tigre IV (four-cylinder in-line air-cooled)
  - Tigre IVA - 125 hp (93 kW)
  - Tigre IVB - 150 hp (112 kW)
- Elizalde Sirio S-VII-A (450 hp seven-cylinder radial air-cooled)
