= Hélity Copter Airlines =

Spanish helicopter airline

IATA	ICAO	Call sign
HY	HTY	CEUTA
- Founded: 2014
- Commenced operations: November 2014
- Operating bases: Ceuta Heliport
- Fleet size: 2
- Headquarters: Ceuta, Spain
- Website: www.helity.es

Hélity Copter Airlines is a Spanish helicopter airline based in Ceuta.

== History ==
The airline was founded in 2014 in order to link the autonomous city of Ceuta with Algeciras and Málaga by helicopter.

Hélity plans to operate direct flights to Melilla from June and, via Algeciras, with Tangier.

== Destinations ==
- Ceuta – Ceuta Heliport (hub)
- Málaga – Málaga Airport
- Algeciras – Algeciras Heliport

== Fleet ==
The Hélity Copter Airlines fleet included the following aircraft

Hélity Copter Airlines fleet
Aircraft	Total	Orders	Passengers (Economy)	Notes
AgustaWestland AW139	3	0	15	
Total	3	0		
