= Burgos Airport =

Public Airport in Burgos, Spain

Burgos Airport Aeropuerto de Burgos
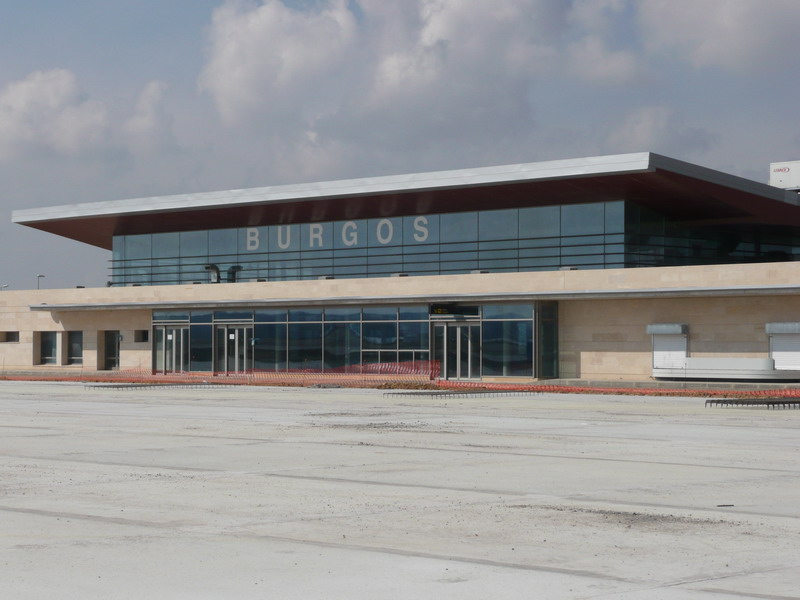
- IATA: RGS; ICAO: LEBG

Summary
- Airport type: Public
- Operator: AENA
- Serves: Burgos, Spain
- Elevation AMSL: 903 m / 2,963 ft
- Coordinates: 42°21′27″N 03°36′49″W

Map
- Location of airport in Spain

Runways
Direction	Length		Surface
Direction	m	ft	Surface
04/22	2,100	6,890	Asphalt
05/23	1,500	4,921	Asphalt - CLOSED

Statistics (2019)
- Passengers: 17.687 ▲71%
- Movements: 3.221 ▲52.5%
- Source: AIP España, Aena

Burgos Airport (Spanish: Aeropuerto de Burgos) (IATA: RGS, ICAO: LEBG), also known as Villafría, is an airport located 4 kilometres (2.5 mi) east of the historic center of Burgos, a city in Spain. The company Aeronova has its maintenance headquarters in Villafría.

== History ==
The origins of Villafría aerodrome date back to the 1920s, when a small aeronautical detachment was established in Gamonal, which served its purpose until it became too small to cope with the progress in aeronautics. After this, the government of King Alfonso XIII created the national Villafría Burgos airport by Royal Decree on 19 July 1927. On 3 January 1928, the Cabinet approved the construction of Burgos airport and, on the 15th of the same month, Villafría Town Hall agreed to cede the field called Gorreñal to the Superior Council of Military Aeronautics for the airport to be built there. As from 1936, the fields of Gamonal and Villafría joined their facilities, which went on to form a single aeronautical infrastructure.

On 8 August 1941, Burgos City Hall agreed to purchase a country estate of almost 300,000 square metres (3,200,000 sq ft) that formed part of the old Monte de Gamonal. On 10 November, the mayor offered this land to the Air Ministry. On 6 December, a decree granted the urgent installation of services and work to be carried out on the fields that it was trying to link.

In fact, the Air Ministry was founded in Burgos after the civil war, when the Military Aeronautical Service forces created by King Alfonso XIII in 1910 were modernised. These, in turn, were inherited from the Military Service Air Station, that belonged at the time to the Military Engineering Corp, established by the same monarch.

On 21 July 1949, the University Air Militia began its activities, after which 22 classes would form in its facilities, the offices of the latter being handed over in 1971. Villafría airdrome was opened to civil traffic in the autumn of that year. In 1973, what is now the Burgos Royal Flying Club was set up. Since then, and during the summer, the airport has hosted different teaching and training activities.

In August 1995, the Ministry of Defence signed an agreement with Burgos City Council making the Villafría aerodrome facilities exclusively for civil use. On 20 October 2000, the aerodrome was declared a site of general interest, directly managed by the central government, through Aena.

On 3 July 2008, the airport opened its doors to commercial flight operations. In order to do this, Aena has undertaken a series of measures, including the construction of a new terminal building with parking facilities, a multi-service building, a new runway and an aircraft parking apron.

== Airlines and destinations ==
Airlines	Destinations
Iberia	Seasonal: Palma de Mallorca

Other nearby airports are Valladolid Airport, located 134 km (83.26 mi) south west, Bilbao Airport, located 176 km (109.36 mi) north east and Madrid–Barajas Airport, located 230 km (142.92 mi) south of Burgos Airport.

== Statistics ==
Year	Passenger Numbers	Air Cargo (kg.)	Flight Operations
2008	13,037	0	1,501
2009	27,716	0	3,571
2010	33,595	1,766	3,559
2011	35,447	308	3,960
2012	21,057	0	2,904
2013	18,905	0	2,305
2014	21,583	3,493	2,418
2015	9,080	0	2,167
2016	4,682	350	1,750
2017	5,953	0	2,366
2018	10,341	1,600	2,112
2019	17,687	39,646	3,221

== Ground transportation ==
=== Public transport ===
There is an urban bus that provides airport service to and from the center of Burgos. The route begins in Plaza de España and stops in the following streets: Belorado, Segovia, Avenida de Castilla y León, San Roque, Glorieta de Logroño, San Bruno, Pablo Ruiz Picasso, Real y Antigua, Vitoria 252, Alcalde Martín Cobos and from here to the airport terminal. The route from the airport to the center will be on a reverse route with stops in the next points: Martín Cobos, Vitoria 259, Real y Antigua, Vitoria 163, San Bruno, Antigua Academia de Ingenieros, San Roque, Avenida de Castilla y León, Avenida de la Paz 51, Antonio Machado and Plaza de España.

The route schedules depend on the time of the flight; the bus will depart from Plaza España to the airport an hour and one-half before a flight and from the airport to the center one-half hour after the arrival of a flight.

=== Car and taxi ===
Burgos Airport is located to the north east of the province capital city, on a broad plain between the neighbourhoods of Gamonal and Villafría de Burgos, where the N-120 road and A-1 highway (also called ring road BU-30) meet in a great roundabout. From here to the airport building, there is a 650-metre (0.40 mi) long road that ends opposite the terminal building. It takes a 10 minutes ride by car or taxi to get to the city centre. A taxi ride costs approximately €10 or slightly more.

There is a parking garage with a capacity of 188 cars, some semi-underground, for passengers coming with their own car.
