= San Luis Aerodrome =

San Luis Aerodrome Aeródromo de San Luis
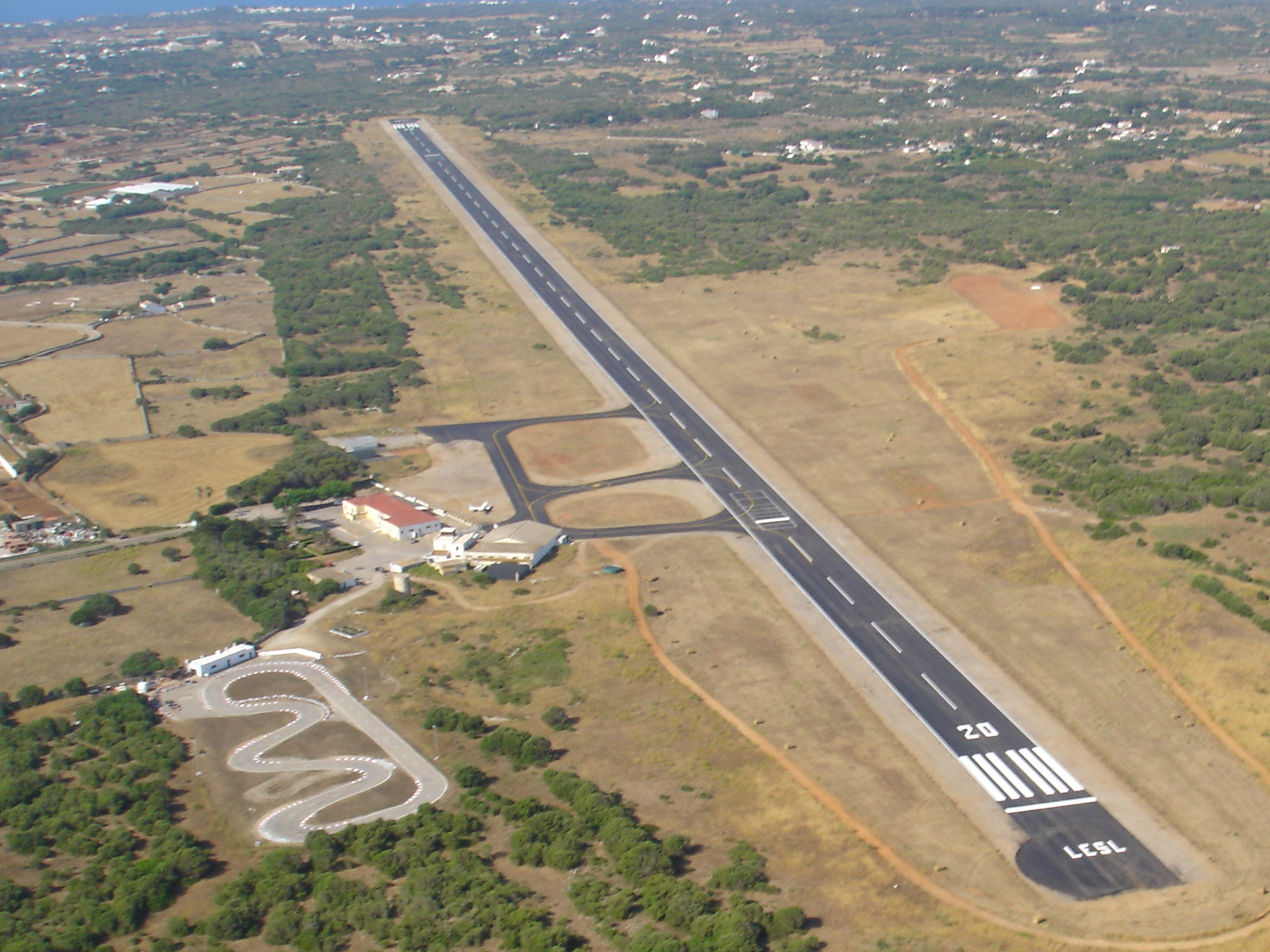
- San Luis Aerodrome
- IATA: none; ICAO: LESL

Summary
- Airport type: Private
- Operator: Real Aero Club de Mahón
- Location: Mahon
- Elevation AMSL: 197 ft / 60 m
- Coordinates: 39°51′44″N 04°15′30″E

Map
- Location of airport in Spain

Runways
Direction	Length		Surface
Direction	ft	m	Surface
02/20	6,070	1,850	Asphalt

San Luis Aerodrome (Spanish: Aeródromo de San Luis) (ICAO: LESL) was the first civil airfield on Menorca. Originally built during the 1920s it was converted for military aircraft activities during the Spanish Civil War. The airfield is located in the Sant Lluís municipalitynear to Mahón (only 2½ km from the town centre). During 1949, San Luis was equipped as a customs airport and opened to domestic and international traffic in August. Over the following decade, the airport traffic increased which facilitated two extensions of the runway. However the airport could neither accommodate larger aircraft nor could the runway be extended. In 1967, San Luis was assigned to Real Aero Club de Mahón Menorca (Royal Mahon Flying Club) and since then this entity has been responsible for the conservation and maintenance of the facilities of the Pilot and Aeromodelling School. All civilian services were transferred to the island's newly constructed main airport on March 24, 1969. Today it is primarily used for general and leisure aviation, with approximately 3,000 flights per year.

== Aeronautical Fleet ==
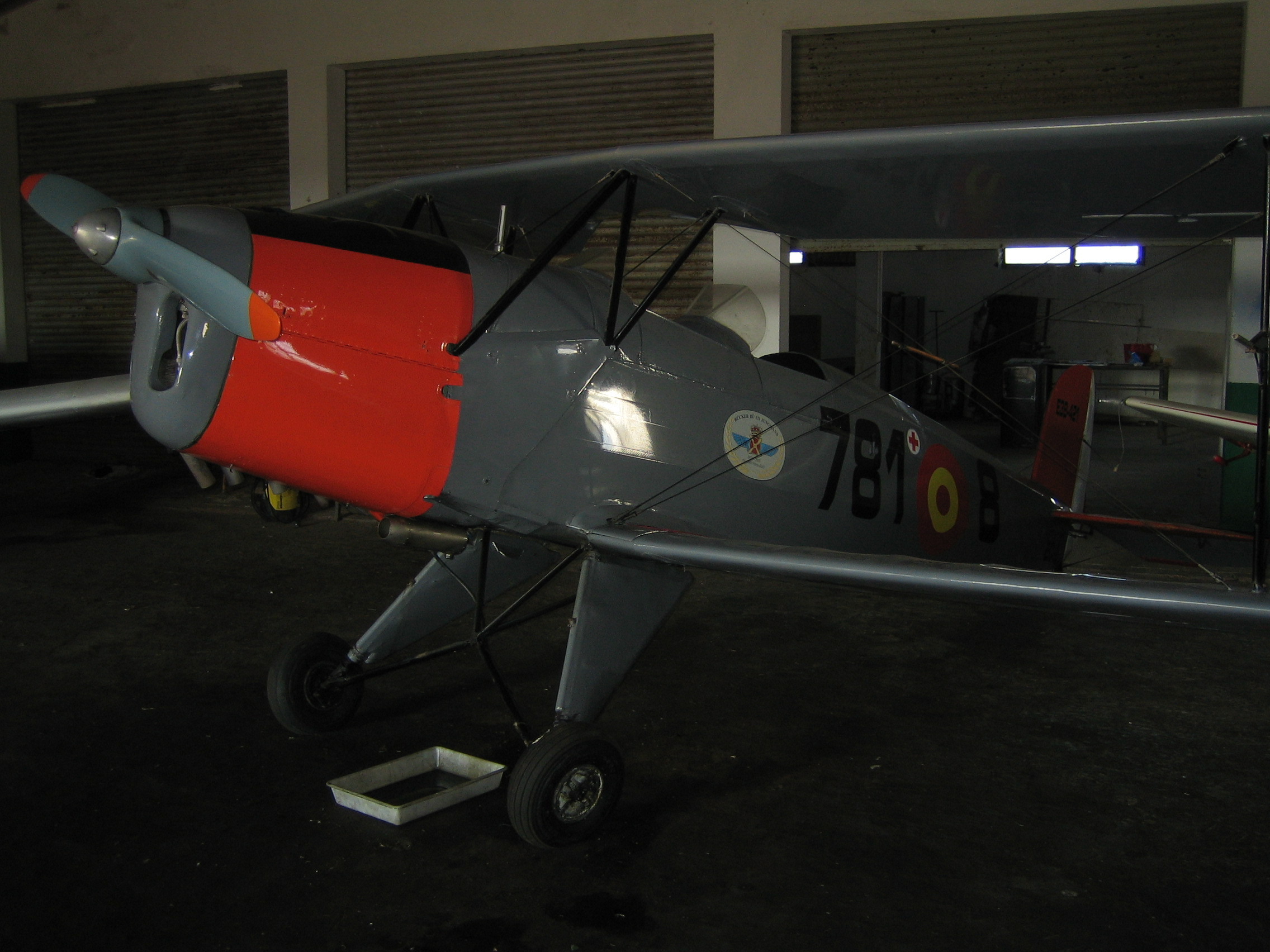
Bücker, German plane of war.

San Luis Aerodrome has a fleet of five light aircraft:

- Cessna 172N with a Lycoming 170 hp engine.
- Cessna 150 Aerobat with a Continental Rolls-Royce O-240A 125 hp engine.
- Aisa I-11-B with a Continental C-90 hp engine (first flight in 1953).
- AISA I-115 with an ENMA Tigre 150 hp engine (first flight in 1952).
- Bücker Jungmann, German plane of war of Spanish manufacture with an ENMA Tigre G-IV 125 hp engine, used nowadays for acrobatic flights (first flight in 1950).
