= Valladolid Airport =

Valladolid Airport Aeropuerto de Valladolid

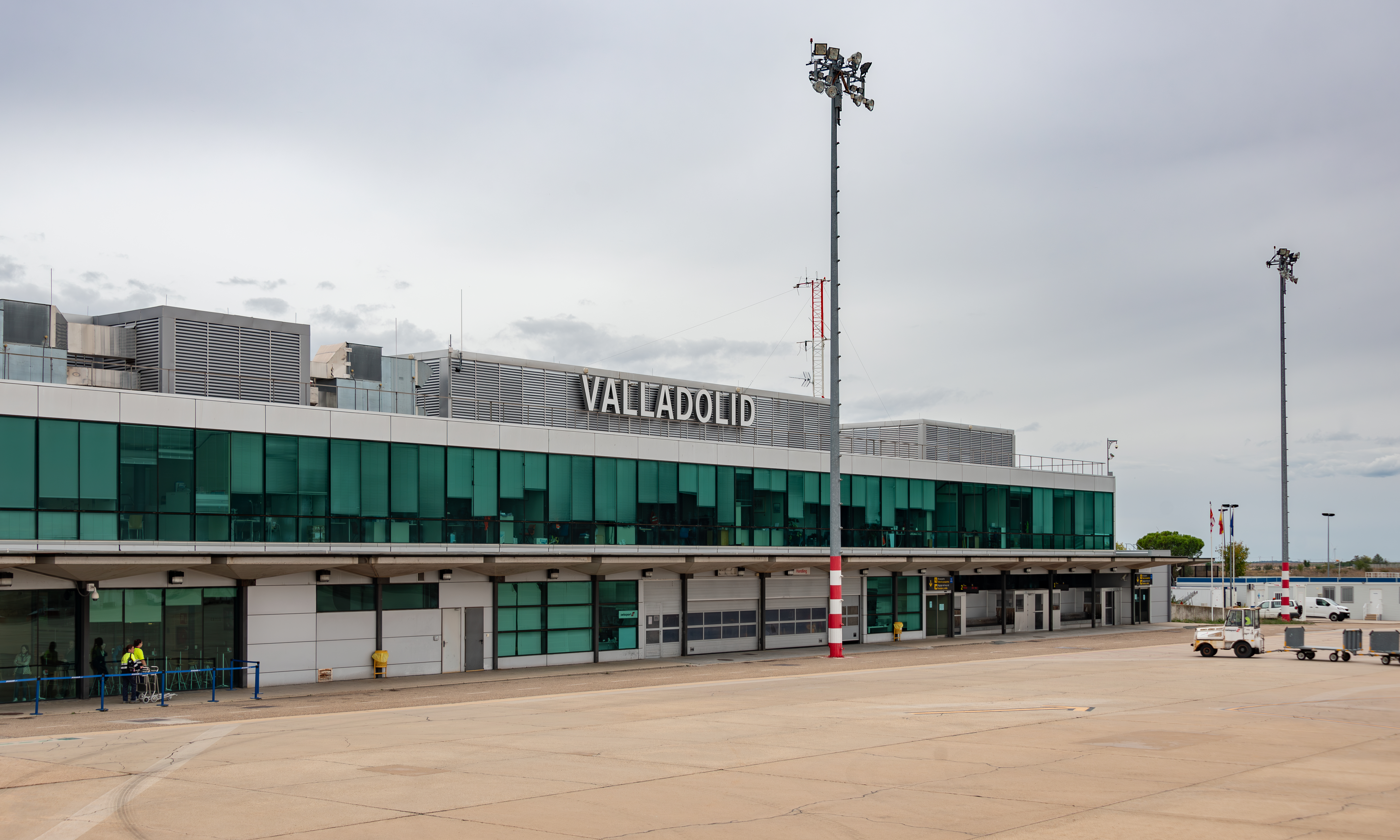
- IATA: VLL; ICAO: LEVD

Summary
- Airport type: Public and military
- Owner/Operator: AENA
- Serves: Valladolid and Palencia, Spain
- Location: Villanubla, Valladolid, Castile and León, Spain
- Elevation AMSL: 2,776 ft (846 m)
- Coordinates: 41°42′22″N 04°51′07″W

Map
- Location of airport in Spain

Runways
Direction	Length		Surface
Direction	ft	m	Surface
05/23	9,843	3,000	Asphalt
15/33	2,976	900	Grass

Statistics (2025)
- Passengers: 87,544
- Passengers change 24-25: ▼54.4%
- Movements: 5,804
- Movements change 24-25: ▼12.1%
- Cargo (t): 35
- Cargo change 24-25: ▼84.4%
- Sources: https://www.aena.es/es/estadisticas/inicio.html

Valladolid Airport (IATA: VLL, ICAO: LEVD) is an airport situated in the municipality of Villanubla, ten kilometres northwest of Valladolid (Castile and León, Spain). The civilian airport shares space with an air base of the Spanish Air and Space Force called "Base Aérea de Villanubla" (Villanubla Air Base). It is today the largest and busiest airport of Castile and León (largely surpassing León, Salamanca and Burgos).

== History ==
The airport was opened in 1938 in Villanubla, a small town 11 km from Valladolid. It has been renovated in 1952, 1972, 1982, 1990 and 2000.

In 1970, the company Aviaco began operating scheduled flights. In 1982, an ILS category I system was installed on runway 23. The runway was extended in 1990.

In the mid 1990s, Aviaco operated scheduled flights to Paris Orly using MD88 aircraft.

=== 21st Century ===
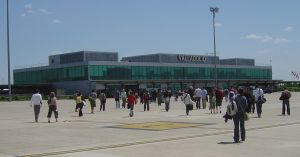
Valladolid Airport in 2006

The new passenger terminal was inaugurated in 2000, and its main features are its clean, functional design, emphasised by spaciousness and numerous aesthetically pleasing elements. During recent years, with the arrival of low-cost airline companies, passenger numbers have increased greatly, particularly in the area of tourist and holiday flights. The terminal offers all the usual amenities expected by passengers, including a duty-free shop, café and restaurant, ATM and information services.

During the 2000s, Air France operated twice daily flights to Paris CDG.

In 2025 Ryanair cancelled all of its operations in Valladolid citing airport fees. In October 2025, Vueling started flights to Barcelona again, having previously operated the route until 2024.

== Airlines and destinations ==
The following airlines operate regular scheduled and charter flights at Valladolid Airport:

Airlines	Destinations
Binter Canarias	Gran Canaria, Tenerife–North
Iberia	Seasonal: Palma de Mallorca, Tenerife–North
Vueling	Barcelona

== Statistics ==
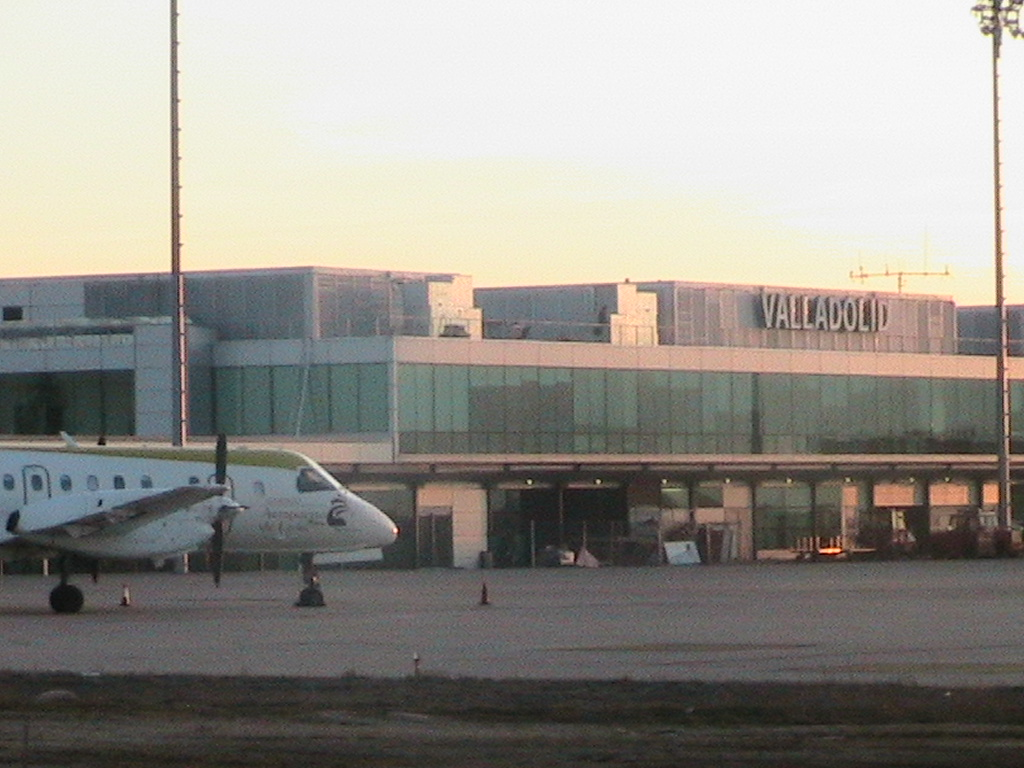
The terminal building

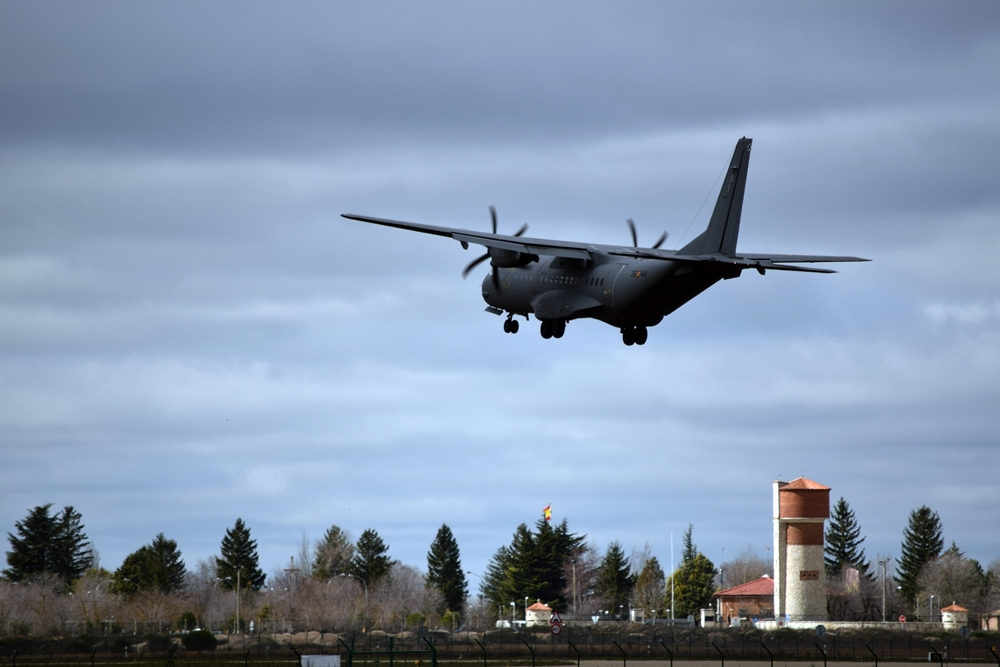
CASA C-295M of the Spanish Air and Space Force at the point of landing at the military base

Passenger numbers and aircraft movements since 2000:

Passenger volume
Year	Passengers
2000	207,000
2001	195,000
2002	205,000
2003	232,000
2004	442,000
2005	445,000
2006	458,000
2007	512,929
2008	479,716
2009	365,683
2010	392,683
2011	462,477
2012	378,419
2013	260,271
2014	223,587
2015	218,293
2016	231,868
2017	227,269
2018	253,271
2019	249,224
2020	71,685
2021	102,543
2022	172,006
2023	208,923
2024	192,038

Operations volume
Year	Operations
2000	8,692
2001	8,510
2002	8,169
2003	8,192
2004	11,386
2005	12,056
2006	11,582
2007	14,093
2008	13,002
2009	9,233
2010	8,969
2011	9,077
2012	6,520
2013	4,591
2014	4,388
2015	4,650
2016	4,419
2017	5,089
2018	5,032
2019	5,670
2020	2,843
2021	5,651
2022	7,278
2023	6,533

Cargo volume
Year	Tonnes
2000	
2001	
2002	
2003	
2004	678,217
2005	303,454
2006	120,804
2007	31,012
2008	34,650
2009	75,174
2010	31,890
2011	46,200
2012	18,756
2013	28,514
2014	21,744
2015	78,704
2016	29,862
2017	25,545
2018	149,687
2019	10,849
2020	5,551
2021	1,988
2022	6,967
2023	6,120

Source: Airport of Valladolid, AENA

== See also ==
- Valladolid
- Province of Valladolid
- List of airports in Spain
