= Elizalde Tigre IV =

Spanish four-cylinder inverted air-cooled engine

Tigre IV
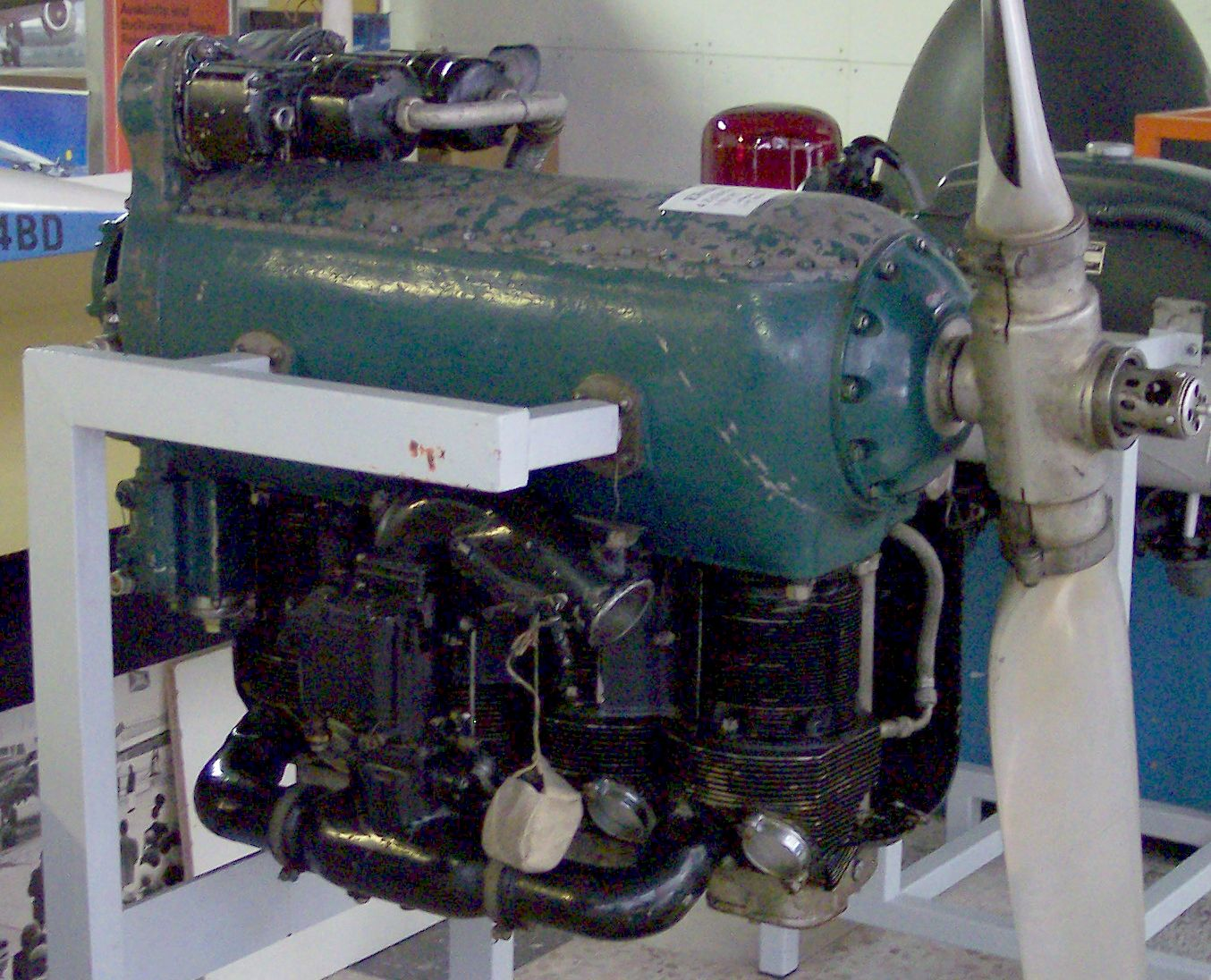
- Preserved Elizalde Tigre.
- Type: Piston inline aero-engine
- Manufacturer: Elizalde SA.

The Elizalde Tigre IV, also known as the ENMA Tigre IV, is a Spanish four-cylinder inverted air-cooled engine designed and built by Elizalde SA shortly after the Spanish Civil War.

== Variants / Designations ==
Tigre IVA
93 kW (125 hp) version.
Tigre IVB
110 kW (150 hp) version.
Tigre G-IV A
IVA / G-4 (L)-00-125
Tigre G-IV A2
IVA / G-4 (L)-00-125
Tigre G-IV A5
Tigre G-IV B
IVB / G-4 (L)-00-150
Tigre G-IV B5
Tigre G-4 (L)-00-125
IVA / G-IV A
Tigre G-4 (L)-00-150
IVB / G-IV B

== Applications ==
- CASA 1.131
- Dornier Do 25
- AISA I-115
- INTA HM.1

== Survivors ==
Approximately 30 ENMA Tigre IV engines remain airworthy in Britain (as of July 2009), all powering CASA 1.131 aircraft which are Spanish licensed-built versions of the Bücker Jungmann.

Approximately 30 Tigre G-IV B engines are under restoration by the company Air Res Aviation located in Poland. The engines will be mainly intended for Bu-131 Jungmann's airplanes restored by Air Res Aviation.

== Specifications (Tigre IVA) ==
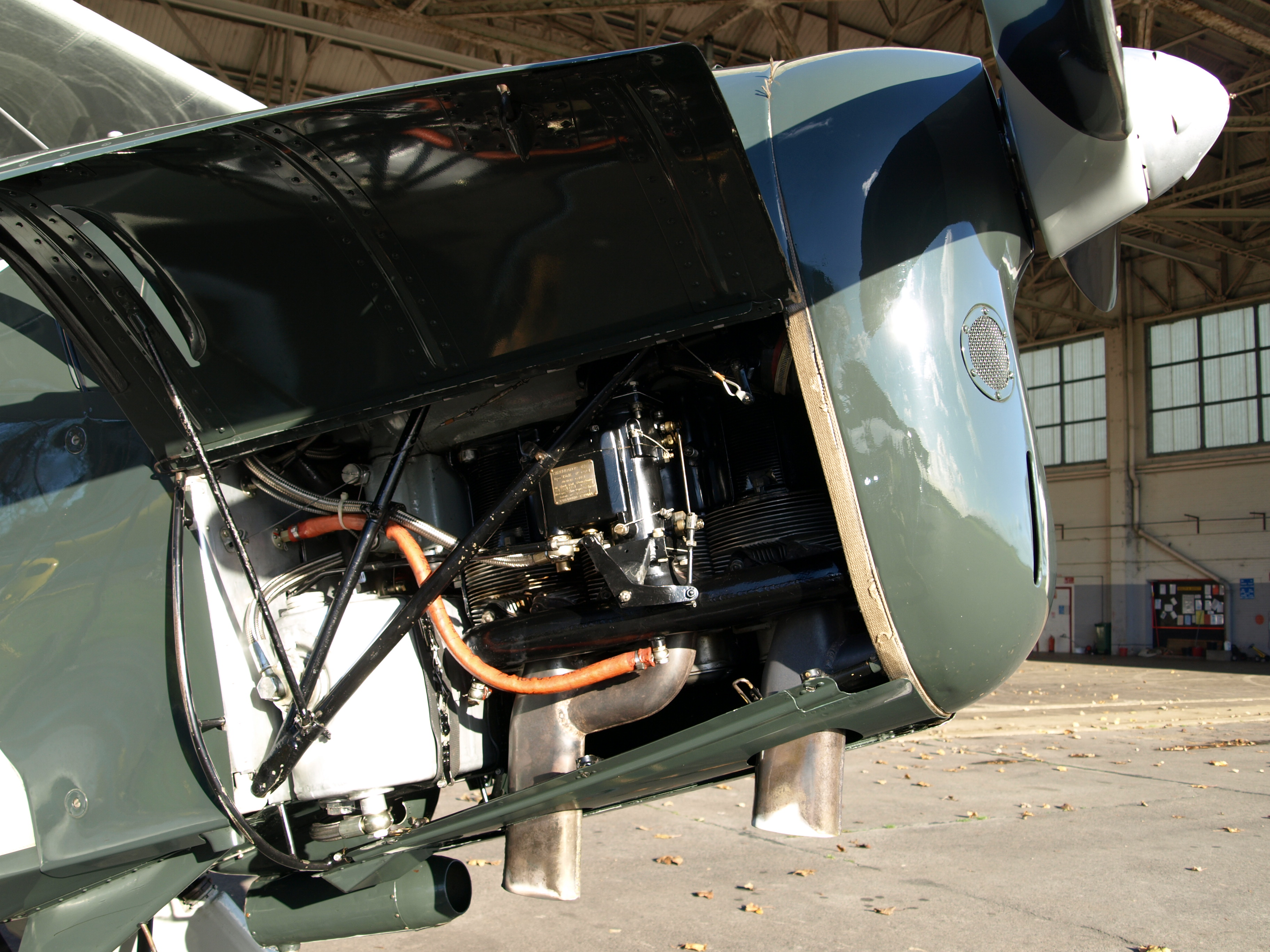
ENMA Tigre IVB installed in a Jungmann biplane

Data from: Janes

=== General characteristics ===
- Type: Four-cylinder, in-line, inverted, air-cooled
- Bore: 120 mm (4.72 in)
- Stroke: 140 mm (5.512 in)
- Displacement: 6.3 L (386.3 in³)
- Length: 1144 mm (43.89 in)
- Width: 400 mm (15.76 in)
- Height: 877 mm (34.55 in)
- Dry weight: 120 kg (264 lbs)

=== Components ===
- Valvetrain: Overhead valve
- Fuel system: Carburettor
- Cooling system: Air-cooled

=== Performance ===
- Power output: 93 kW (125 hp) at 2,200 rpm
- Compression ratio: 6:1
- Power-to-weight ratio: 0.77 kW/kg (0.47 hp.lb)

== See also ==
Comparable engines

- Alfa Romeo 110
- Cirrus Major
- de Havilland Gipsy Major
- Hirth HM 504
- Menasco C4

Related lists

- List of aircraft engines
