= Dornier Do 27 =

Utility/STOL aircraft

Do 27
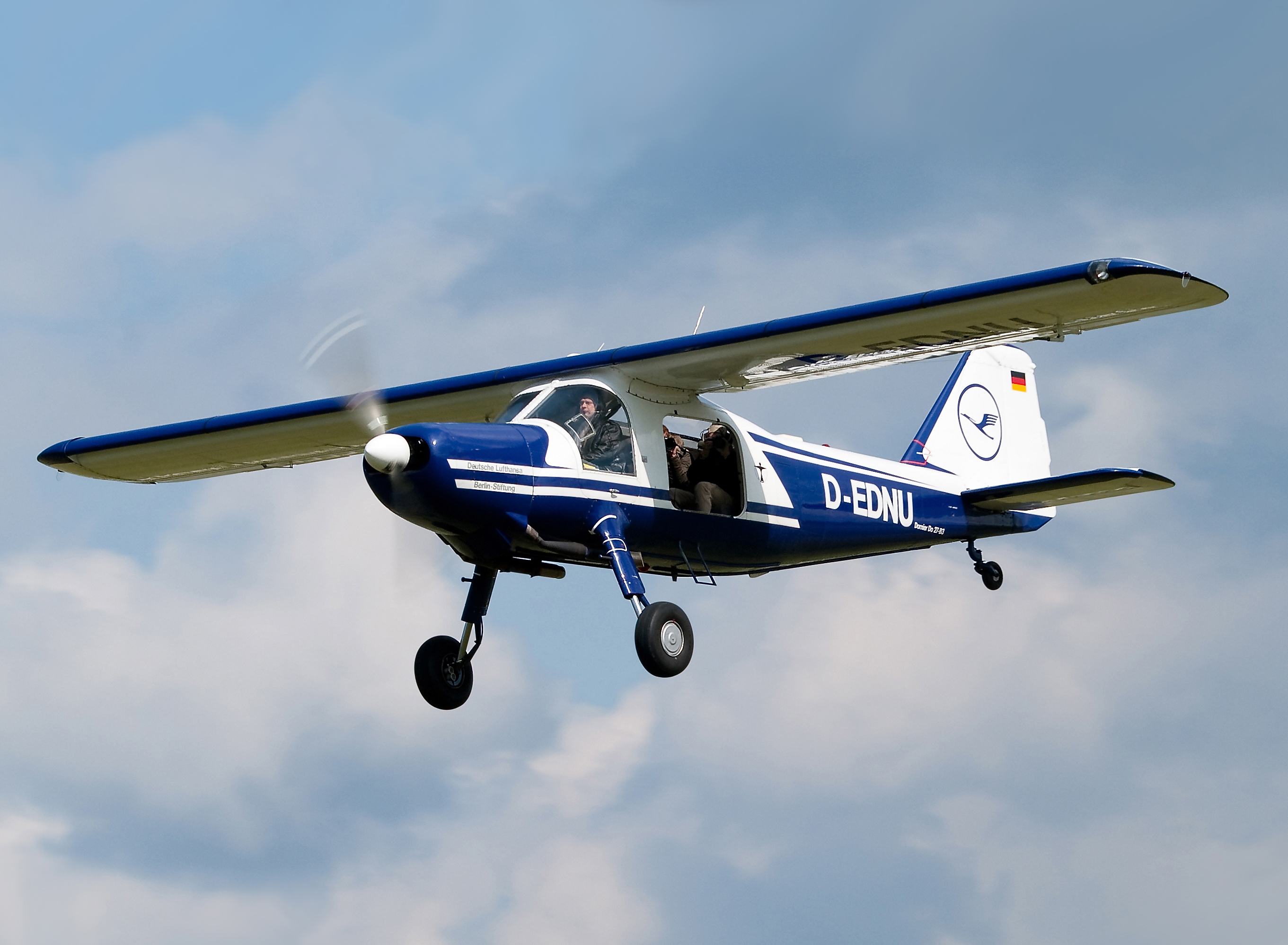
- Dornier Do 27

General information
- Type: STOL light utility aircraft
- Manufacturer: Dornier Flugzeugbau GmbH
- Status: In civilian use
- Primary users: German Air Force Portuguese Air Force; Spanish Air Force; Israeli Air Force
- Number built: 571

History
- Manufactured: 1955–1965
- First flight: June 27, 1955
- Developed into: Dornier Do 28; Dornier Do 29

The Dornier Do 27 is a German single-engine STOL utility aircraft that was designed and manufactured by Dornier GmbH (later DASA Dornier and Fairchild-Dornier). It was notable for being the first mass-produced aircraft in Germany following the end of the Second World War.

The Do 27's precursor, the Do 25, was developed by Dornier at the firm's facilities in Spain in order to satisfy a Spanish military requirement that called for a light utility aircraft with short takeoff and landing (STOL) performance. However, the Do 25 was not selected for production by Spain. Despite this, the aircraft was developed further to produce the Do 27, which was produced in quantity in both Spain and Germany. In addition to domestic sales, a large number of export customers, such as Portugal, emerged for the Do 27, and it had a lengthy service life with some examples still being used into the twenty-first century. The aircraft was appreciated for its relatively wide, comfortable cabin and excellent short-field performance. In terms of its configuration, the Do 27 was a classic high-wing, "tail-dragger" aircraft with fixed landing gear.

== History ==
=== Background ===
Shortly following the end of the Second World War, Germany's extensive aerospace industry was dismantled and largely dissolved due to the country having been forbidden to either possess or manufacture military aircraft. Despite this, in both East Germany and West Germany, as the nation had been divided into during the Cold War era, efforts to revive the nation's aerospace industry became widespread during the 1950s.

German aircraft manufacturer Dornier GmbH managed to retain its independence in the conflict's aftermath, and was keen to resume its aviation activities as soon as permissible. During January 1951, the company chose to establish a new technical office in Madrid, Spain, and began bidding for contracts from Spain's Ministry of Aviation; prior to this, Dornier had developed strong ties to Spain via the licensed production of the Messerschmitt Bf 109 fighter.

During 1951, a development contract was secured for a commuter aircraft that possessed short takeoff and landing (STOL) characteristics. Dornier opted to develop a new aircraft, designing a monoplane with a high-mounted wing fitted with oversized flaps, a wide wraparound windscreen, a fixed undercarriage and a relatively spacious cabin. This new aircraft was powered by a single ENMA Tigre G.V; capable of generating a maximum of 110 kW (150 hp), this engine proved to be too weak to achieve satisfactory performance. The first prototype of the Do 25 performed its maiden flight during July 1954.

Due to the Tigre's performance deficit, it was decided to equip the second prototype with an alternative powerplant; it used the American-sourced Continental O-470 engine instead. The second prototype would subsequently function as a demonstrator for an improved derivative of the aircraft, designated Do 27.

=== Redesign and production ===
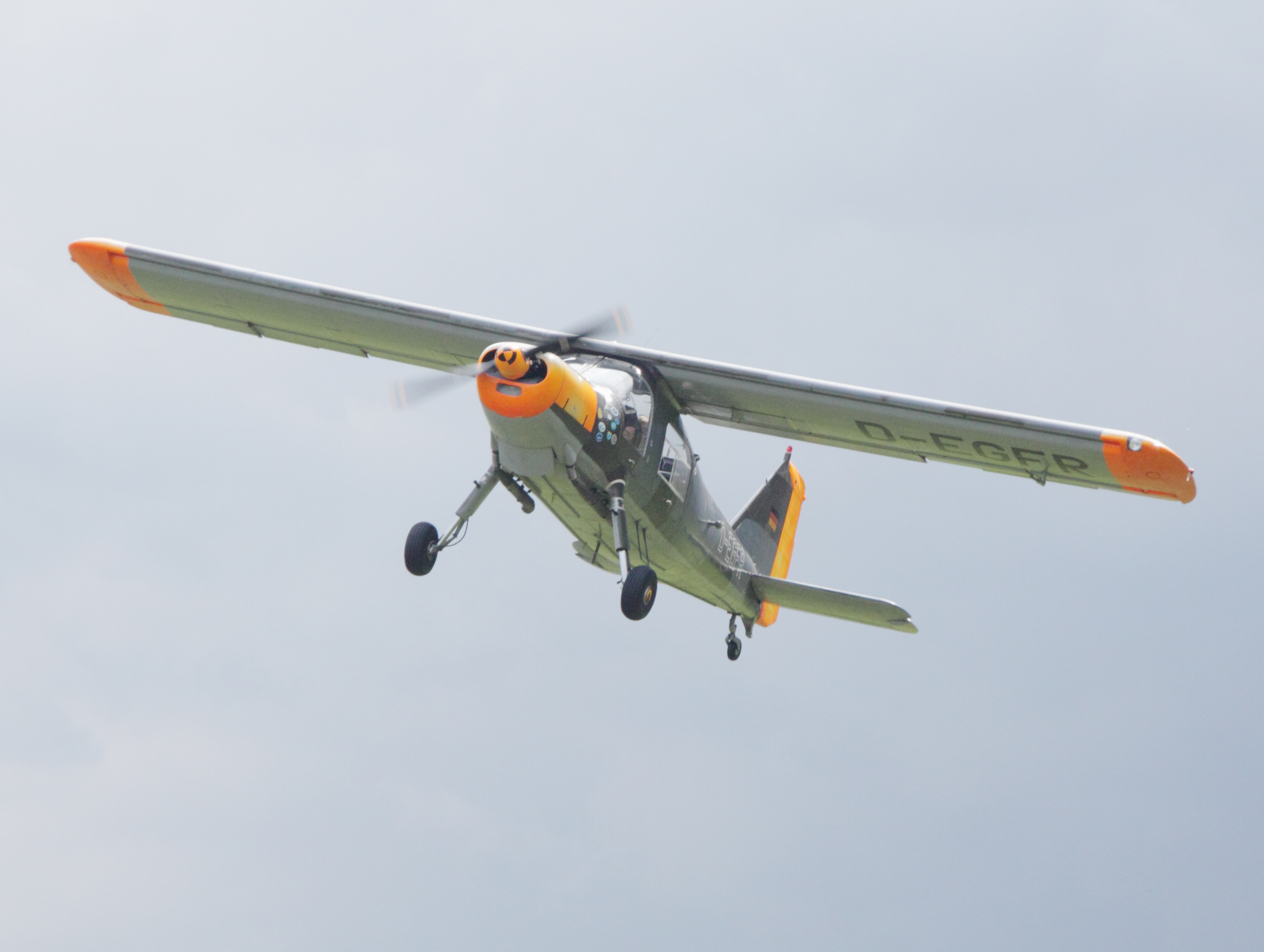
Dornier Do 27 flying overhead

Ultimately, the Do 25 was not selected for production. Despite this setback, Dornier decided to continue refining its design to develop the Do 27, which was sized to seat between four and six personnel. On 27 June 1955, the original prototype performed its maiden flight in Spain. A total of 40 Do 27s were manufactured in Spain by Construcciones Aeronáuticas SA, designated CASA-127. However, the majority of production aircraft were constructed at Dornier's main base in Germany; the first German-built aircraft conducted its first flight on 17 October 1956. A total of 428 Do 27s would be produced in Germany.

A significant portion of the Do 27's production run were acquired by the German military. By the mid-1950s, West Germany had been permitted, and even encouraged, to reequip itself as tensions rose between East and West in the Cold War; due to its ability to operate from compact and unprepared airstrips, the Do 27 quickly garnered favour with military planners. Both the German Air Force and the German Army placed a combined order for 428 aircraft of the Do 27A and Do 27B variants, the latter being equipped with dual controls for use as a trainer aircraft.

The Do 27 was widely employed as a general purpose aircraft, frequently being used for utility transport and liaison duties. Later on in the type's production run, a modified model of the aircraft, known as the Do 27Q-5, was developed; it had the same basic specifications but was equipped with a wider-track landing gear. Furthermore, the aircraft was offered as a twin-float seaplane, the Do 27S-1; another model proposed was furnished with the larger Lycoming GSO-480-B1B6 engine, capable of generating a maximum of 254 kW/340 hp, which was matched with a three-blade propeller, the Do 27H-2.

In addition to the aircraft's adoption by military operators in Germany and Spain, Portugal received 40 new-build and 106 ex-German Do 27s. From 1961 to 1975, the Portuguese Air Force made extensively operational use of the type in the three African theatres of the Portuguese Overseas War. During April 1973, two Do 27s were shot down in Portuguese Guinea by insurgents equipped with SAM-7 Grail Man-portable air-defense system (MANPADS).

During 1966, it was decided to terminate production of the Do 27. By this point, the aircraft had been widely exported to numerous international operators, including Israel, Nigeria, Belgium, Turkey, and Congo. The type was extensively used by the German military into the 1980s, gradually being succeeded in its role by increasingly capable helicopters; many ex-German aircraft were subsequently exported and used by other operators.

== Operational history ==
In 1959, a Do 27 became the first aircraft ever to land on the Caribbean island of Saba, on what is still to this day the shortest commercial runway in the world.

== Variants ==
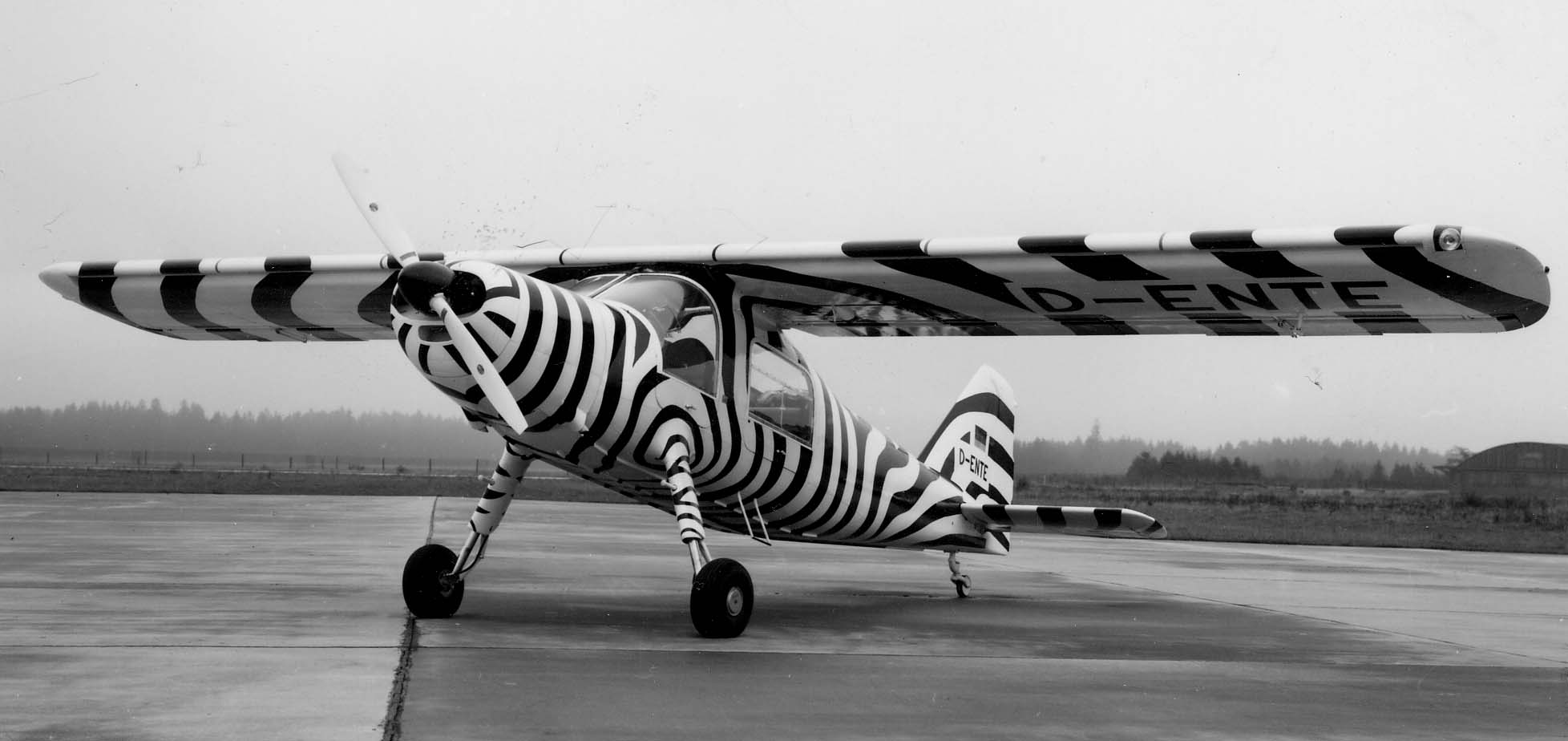
Zebra-patterned Do 27B-2 used by zoologist Bernhard Grzimek.

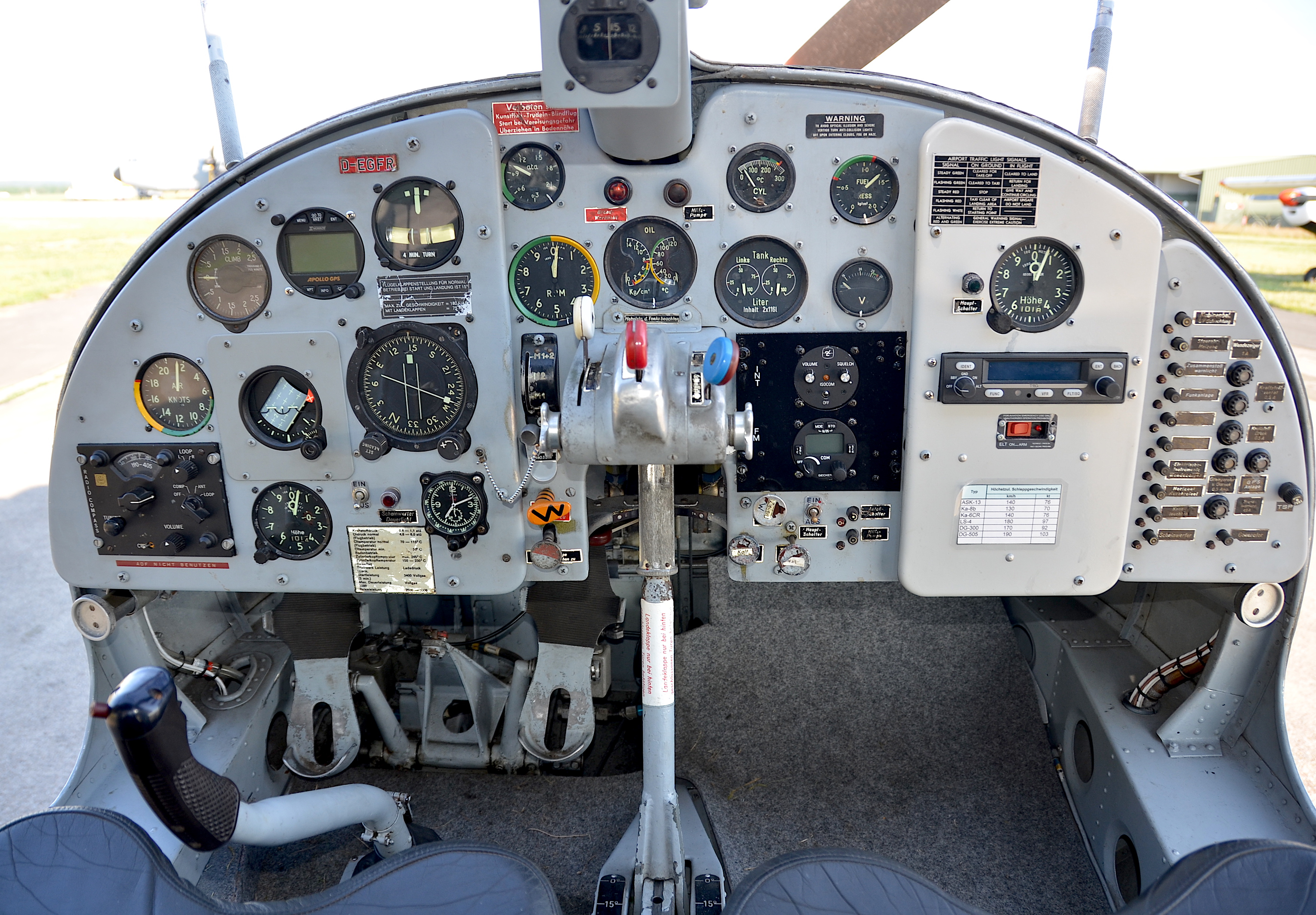
Cockpit of Do 27A-1 (D-EGFR)

Do 25
Precursor aircraft designed to a Spanish requirement and powered by a 110 kW (150 hp) ENMA Tigre G.V engine.
Do 27
Prototype, two built.
Do 27A-1
Military five-seat single-engine STOL utility transport aircraft, 177 built
Do 27A-2
Do 27A-1 with minor modification inside, two built.
Do 27A-3
Do 27A-1 with increased takeoff gross weight, 88 built.
Do 27A-4
Variant with wide landing gear and increased Take Off Gross Weight, 65 built.
Do 27B-1
Dual-control version of the A-1, 86 built.
Do 27B-2
Do 27B-2 with minor modification inside, five built.
Do 27B-3
Do 27B-2 with increased takeoff gross weight, 16 built.
Do 27B-5
Conversions of 27B-3s to 27A-4 standard.
Do 27H-1
Do 27B-2 powered by a 254 kW (340 hp) Avco Lycoming GSO-480 piston engine with a three-bladed propeller and a larger tail, one built.

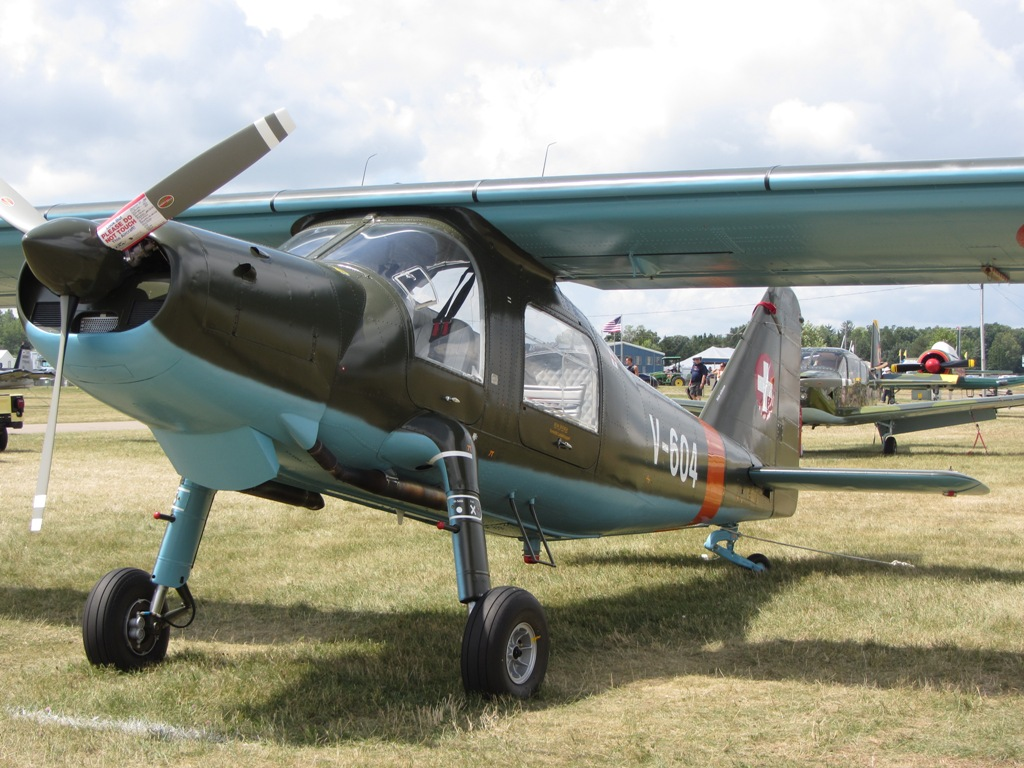
Do 27H-2

Do 27H-2
Variant of the H-1 for the Swiss Air Force with some modifications as applied to the Do 27Q-1
Do 27J-1
Production of the Do 27A-4 for Belgian Army, 12 built.
Do 27K-1
Production of the Do 27A-4 for Portuguese Air Force, 16 built.
Do 27K-2
Similar to K-1 with minor modifications for Portuguese Air Force, 14 built.
Do 27Q-1
Six-seat variant of the A-1 for civil market, 16 built.
Do 27Q-3
Four-seat variant of the Q-1 with a 230 hp Continental O-470K engine, one built.
Do 27Q-4
Improved Q-1 with auxiliary fuel tanks, 34 built.
Do 27Q-5
Improved Q-4 with internal modifications, 12 built.
Do 27Q-5(R)
Restricted category version of the Do 27Q-5.
Do 27Q-6
Variant of the Q-5 with internal changes for Guinea Bissau and Brazil, two built.
Do 27S-1
Floatplane version with enlarged rudder and a ventral fin, one built.
Do 27T
One Do 27Q-4 converted with a Turbomeca Astazou II turboprop engine.

== Operators ==
=== Civil operators ===
Turkey

- General Command of Mapping (Turkey)

Guinea-Bissau

- Linhas Aéreas da Guiné-Bissau

=== Military operators ===
Angola

- National Air Force of Angola

Belgium

- Belgian Army

Belize

- Belize Defence Force

Burundi
Cyprus

- Cyprus Air Forces – Former operator.

Republic of the Congo

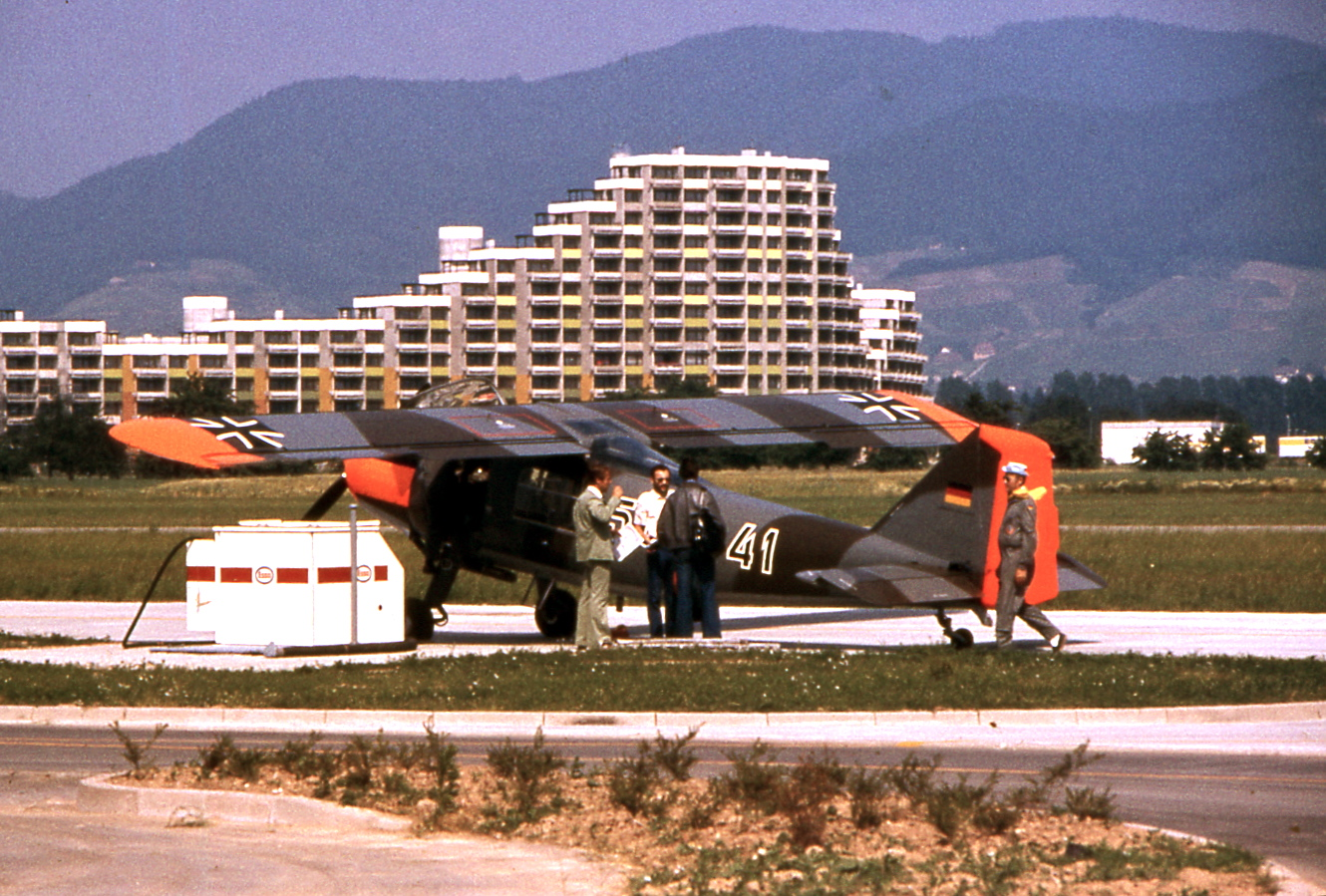
German Air Force Do 27

Germany

- German Air Force
- German Army
- German Navy

Guinea-Bissau

- Guinea-Bissau Air Force

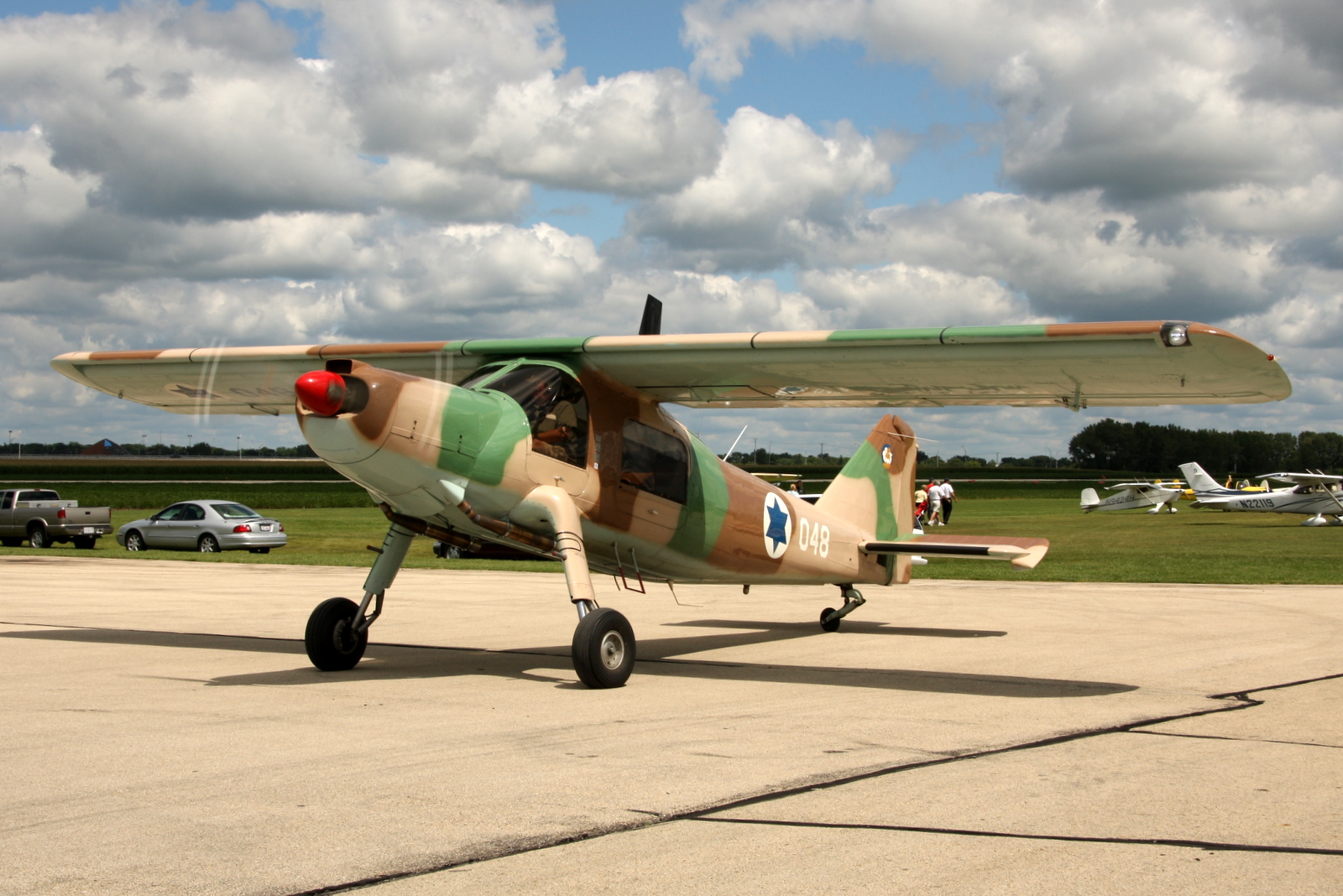
Israeli Air Force Do 27

Israel

- Israeli Air Force

Lesotho

- Lesotho Defence Force

Malawi

- Military of Malawi

Mozambique

- Military of Mozambique

Nigeria

- Nigerian Air Force operated 20 Do 27As at the beginning of the Nigerian Civil War

Portugal

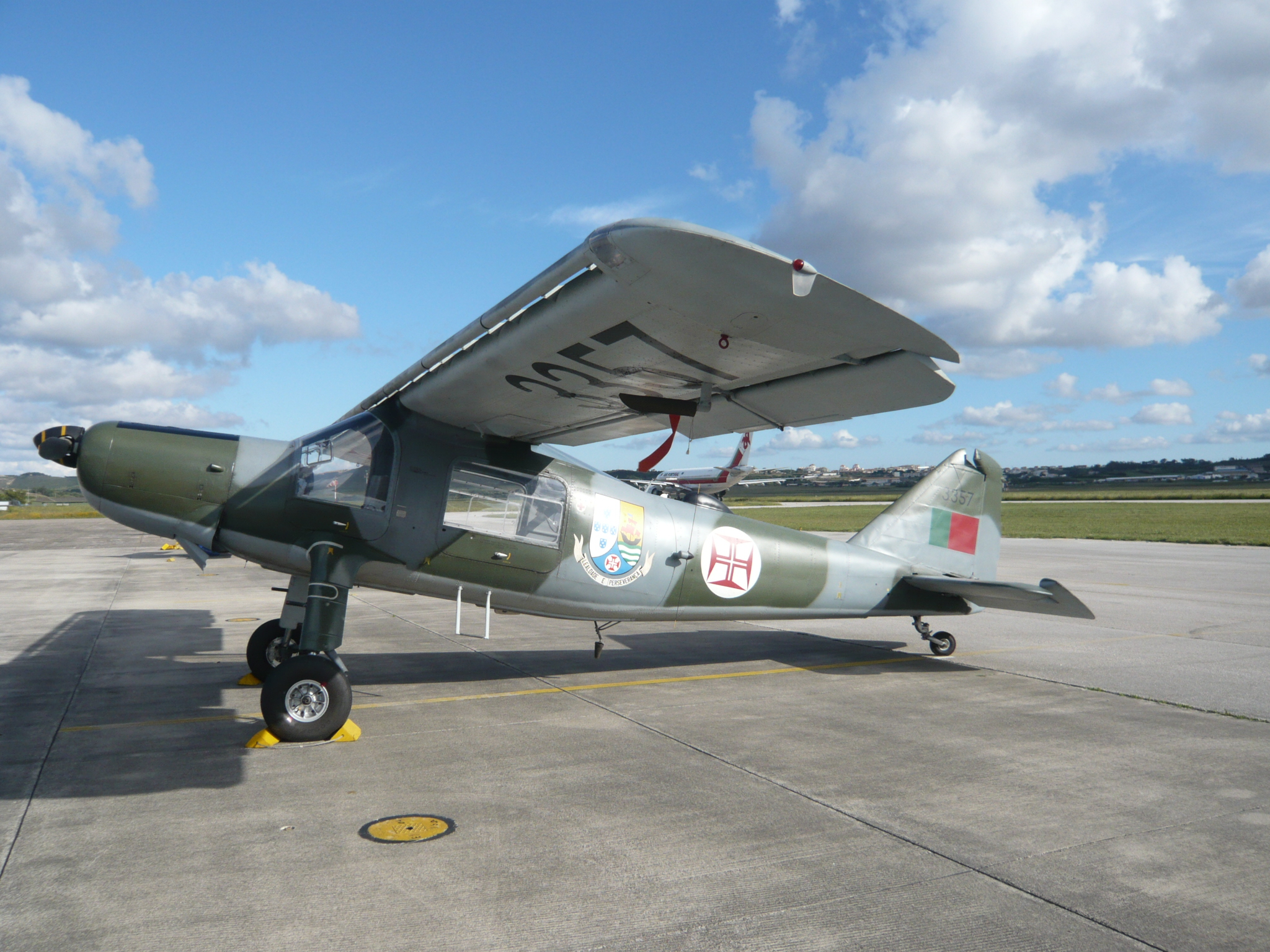
Portuguese Air Force Do 27

- Portuguese Air Force operated 146 aircraft

Rwanda
South Africa

- South African Air Force operated 2 aircraft between 1958 and 1967.

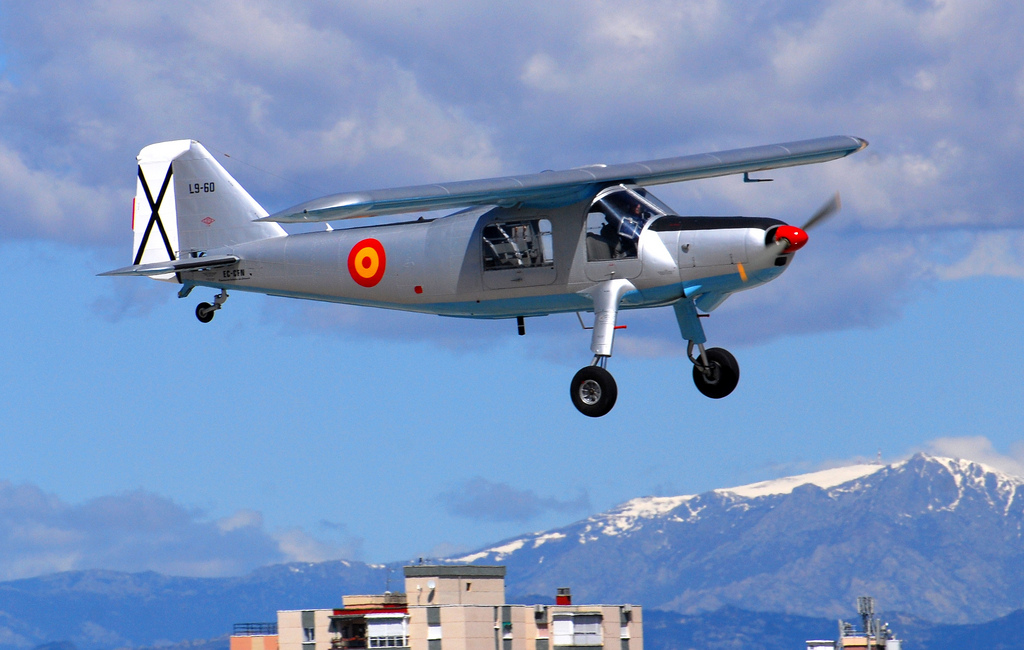
Spanish Air Force Do 27

Spain

- Spanish Air Force

Sudan

- Sudanese Air Force

Sweden

- Swedish Army operated 5 aircraft between 1961 and 1991

Switzerland

- Swiss Air Force

Tanzania

- Tanzania Air Force Command

Turkey

- Turkish Army
- Turkish Gendarmerie

== Specifications (Do 27A) ==
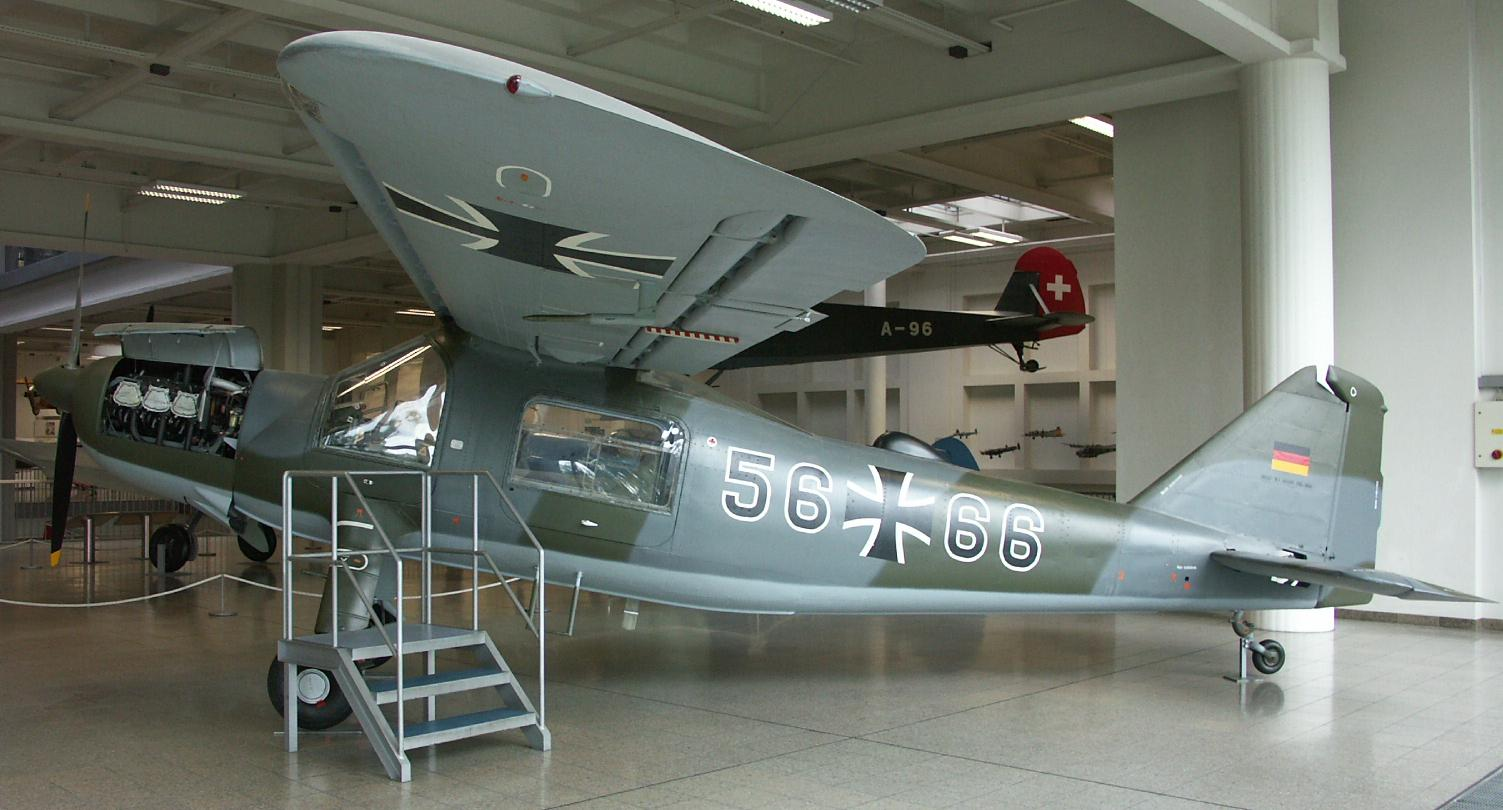
German Air Force Do 27 on display in the Deutsches Museum

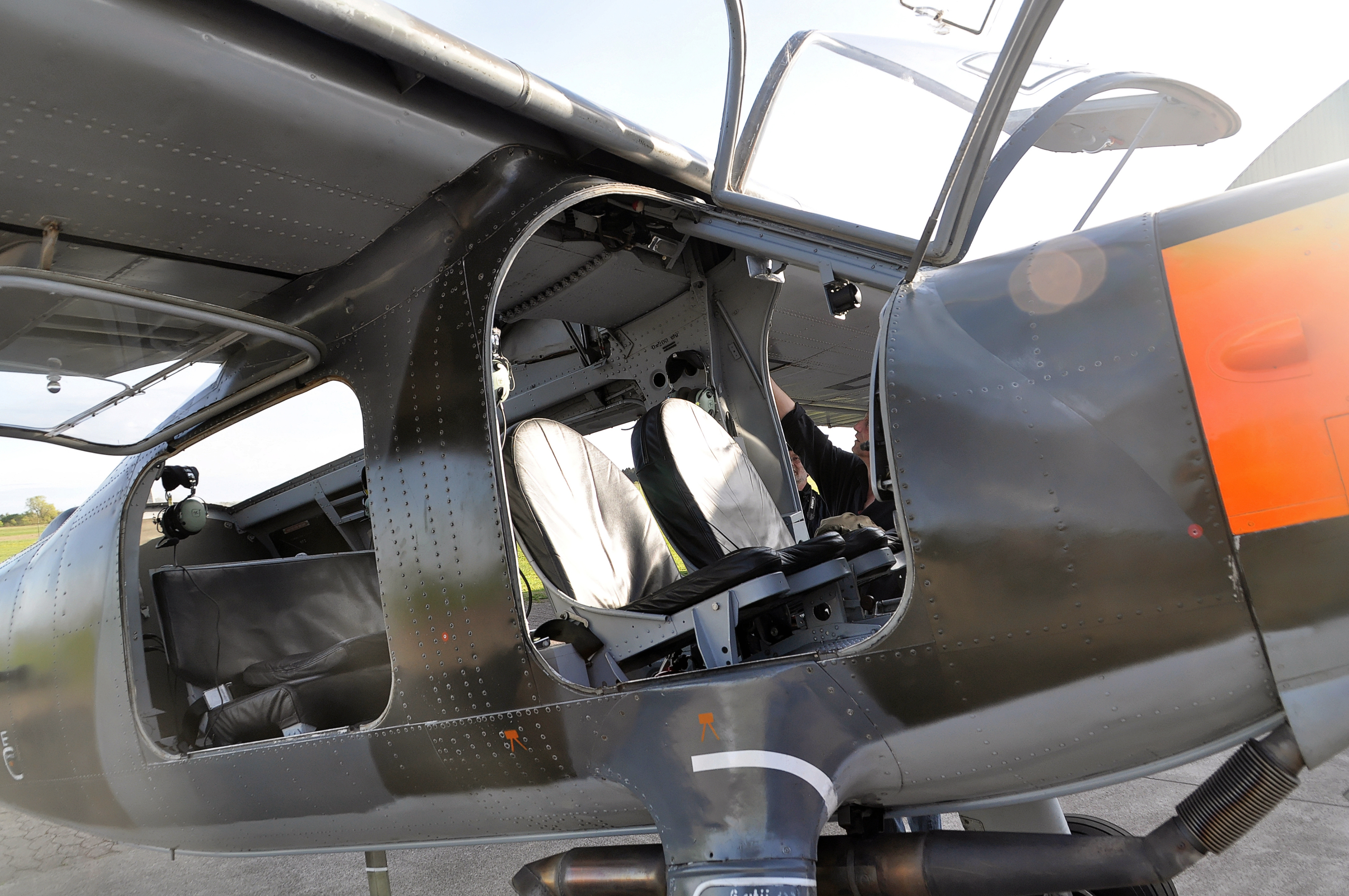
Close view of the cabin with all entrances open from the outside

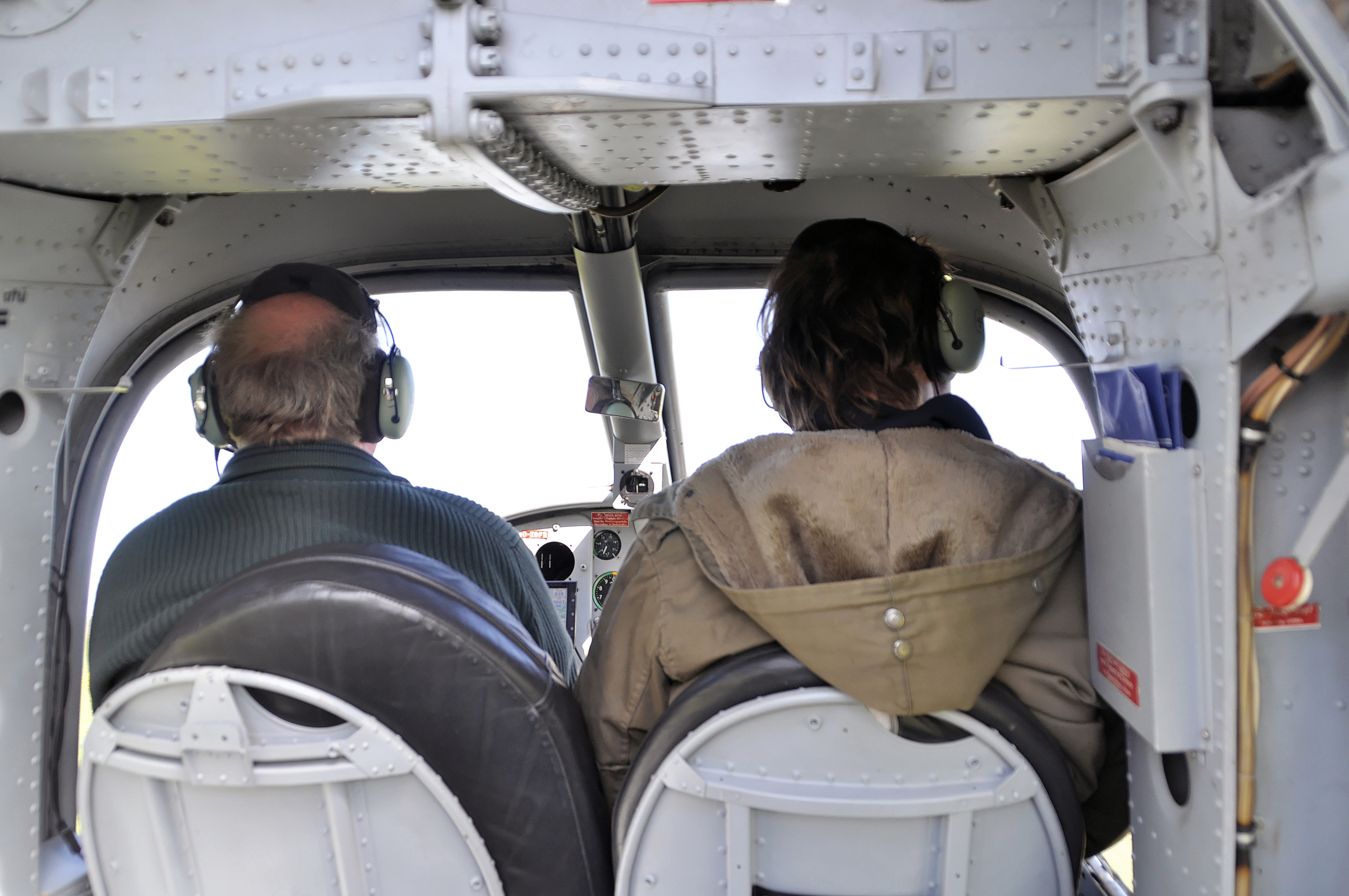
Forward-facing view from inside the cabin, note the pilot at the controls

Data from Jane's all the World's Aircraft 1959-60

General characteristics

- Crew: 1
- Capacity: 4 or 5 pax
- Length: 10.08 m (33 ft 1 in)

Do 27H2 9.9 m (32 ft)
Do 27S 10.08 m (33.1 ft)

- Wingspan: 12 m (39 ft 4 in)
- Height: 4.18 m (13 ft 9 in)

Do 27S 4.18 m (13.7 ft)

- Wing area: 19.4 m^{2} (209 sq ft)
- Aspect ratio: 7.42:1
- Airfoil: NACA 23018
- Empty weight: 985 kg (2,172 lb)

Do 27Q3 1,010 kg (2,230 lb)
Do 27Q4 1,050 kg (2,310 lb)
Do 27S 1,275 kg (2,811 lb)

- Gross weight: 1,570 kg (3,461 lb)

Do 27Q3 1,700 kg (3,700 lb)
Do 27Q4 1,850 kg (4,080 lb)
Do 27S 1,850 kg (4,080 lb)

- Fuel capacity: 220 L (58 US gal; 48 imp gal) in two wing tanks, (Do 27Q4 provision for two 82 L (22 US gal; 18 imp gal) external tanks)
- Powerplant: 1 × Lycoming GO-480-B1A6 6-cylinder air-cooled horizontally-opposed piston engines, 205 kW (275 hp)
- Propellers: 2-bladed Hartzell metal constant-speed propeller, 2.48 m (8 ft 2 in) diameter

Performance

- Maximum speed: 250 km/h (160 mph, 130 kn) at 1,000 m (3,300 ft)

Do 27H2 255 km/h (158 mph; 138 kn)
Do 27Q3 227 km/h (141 mph; 123 kn)
Do 27Q4 247 km/h (153 mph; 133 kn)
Do 27S 237 km/h (147 mph; 128 kn)

- Cruise speed: 205 km/h (127 mph, 111 kn)
- Stall speed: 58 km/h (36 mph, 31 kn)
- Landing speed: 65 km/h (40 mph; 35 kn)
- Range: 870 km (540 mi, 470 nmi)
- Service ceiling: 5,500 m (18,000 ft)
- Time to altitude:

1,000 m (3,300 ft) in 2 minute 36 seconds
2,000 m (6,600 ft) in 6 minute 30 seconds
3,000 m (9,800 ft) in 12 minute
4,500 m (14,800 ft) in 26 minute 30 seconds

- Take-off run to 15 m (49 ft): 170 m (560 ft)
- Landing run from 15 m (49 ft): 160 m (520 ft) in nil wind

== See also ==
Related development

- Dornier Do 28

Aircraft of comparable role, configuration, and era

- Helio Courier
- Pilatus PC-6 Porter
- PZL-104 Wilga
- Scottish Aviation Pioneer
- Max Holste Broussard

Related lists

- List of military aircraft of Germany
