= Villanubla =

Coordinates: 41°42′N 4°50′W

Villanubla, Spain
- Coat of arms

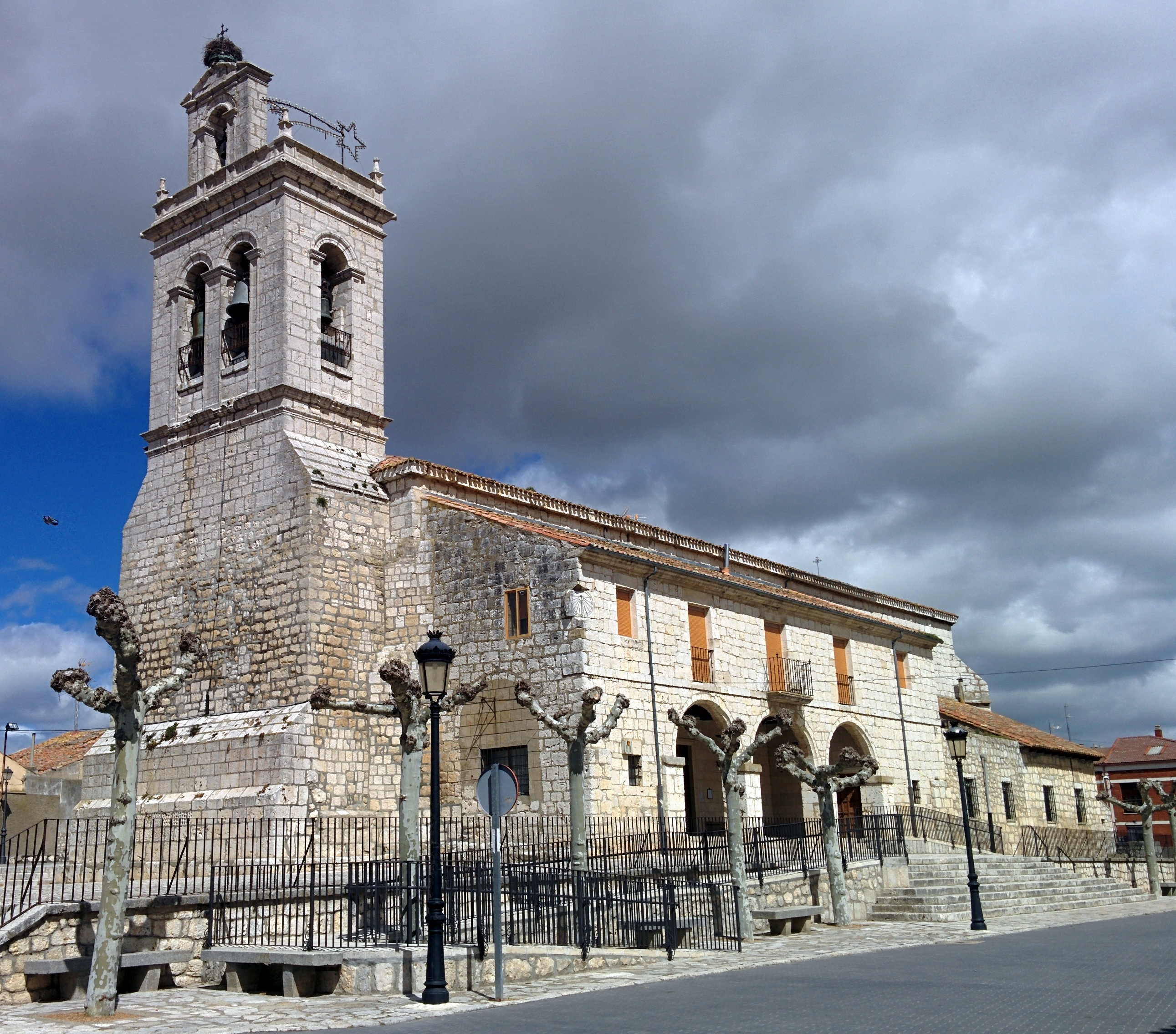
- Church
- Country: Spain
- Autonomous community: Castile and León
- Province: Valladolid
- Municipality: Villanubla

Area
  - Total: 45.36 km^{2} (17.51 sq mi)
- Elevation: 843 m (2,766 ft)

Population (2025-01-01)
  - Total: 2,903
  - Density: 64.00/km^{2} (165.8/sq mi)
- Time zone: UTC+1 (CET)
  - Summer (DST): UTC+2 (CEST)

Villanubla is a municipality located in the province of Valladolid, Castile and León, Spain. According to the 2018 census (INE), the municipality has a population of 2,692 inhabitants.

The Valladolid Airport is located in this municipality.

== Climate ==
Climate data for Villanubla (1991-2020)
Month	Jan	Feb	Mar	Apr	May	Jun	Jul	Aug	Sep	Oct	Nov	Dec	Year
Mean daily maximum °C (°F)	7.6 (45.7)	10.4 (50.7)	14.0 (57.2)	16.0 (60.8)	20.2 (68.4)	25.7 (78.3)	29.2 (84.6)	28.9 (84.0)	24.2 (75.6)	18.2 (64.8)	11.7 (53.1)	8.3 (46.9)	17.9 (64.2)
Daily mean °C (°F)	3.5 (38.3)	5.0 (41.0)	7.8 (46.0)	9.7 (49.5)	13.3 (55.9)	17.7 (63.9)	20.5 (68.9)	20.5 (68.9)	16.9 (62.4)	12.3 (54.1)	7.0 (44.6)	4.2 (39.6)	11.5 (52.8)
Mean daily minimum °C (°F)	−0.6 (30.9)	−0.4 (31.3)	1.6 (34.9)	3.3 (37.9)	6.4 (43.5)	9.8 (49.6)	11.9 (53.4)	12.2 (54.0)	9.5 (49.1)	6.4 (43.5)	2.3 (36.1)	0.0 (32.0)	5.2 (41.4)
Average precipitation mm (inches)	40.1 (1.58)	23.4 (0.92)	30.8 (1.21)	44.1 (1.74)	47.5 (1.87)	30.2 (1.19)	14.4 (0.57)	16.9 (0.67)	29.3 (1.15)	57.8 (2.28)	47.9 (1.89)	44.1 (1.74)	426.5 (16.81)
Average precipitation days (≥ 1 mm)	6.9	5	6.2	7.7	7.3	4.4	2.1	2.5	4.3	7.7	7.5	6.7	68.3
Average relative humidity (%)	84.4	73.6	66	64.7	60.6	52.5	45.7	48.1	57.3	70.7	81	84.8	65.8
Mean monthly sunshine hours	109.3	165.6	198.9	229.6	286.9	325.8	371.7	341.5	243.8	189.8	131.8	102.1	2,696.8
Source: NOAA

== See also ==
- Cuisine of the province of Valladolid
