= Ceuta Heliport =

Ceuta Heliport Helipuerto de Ceuta
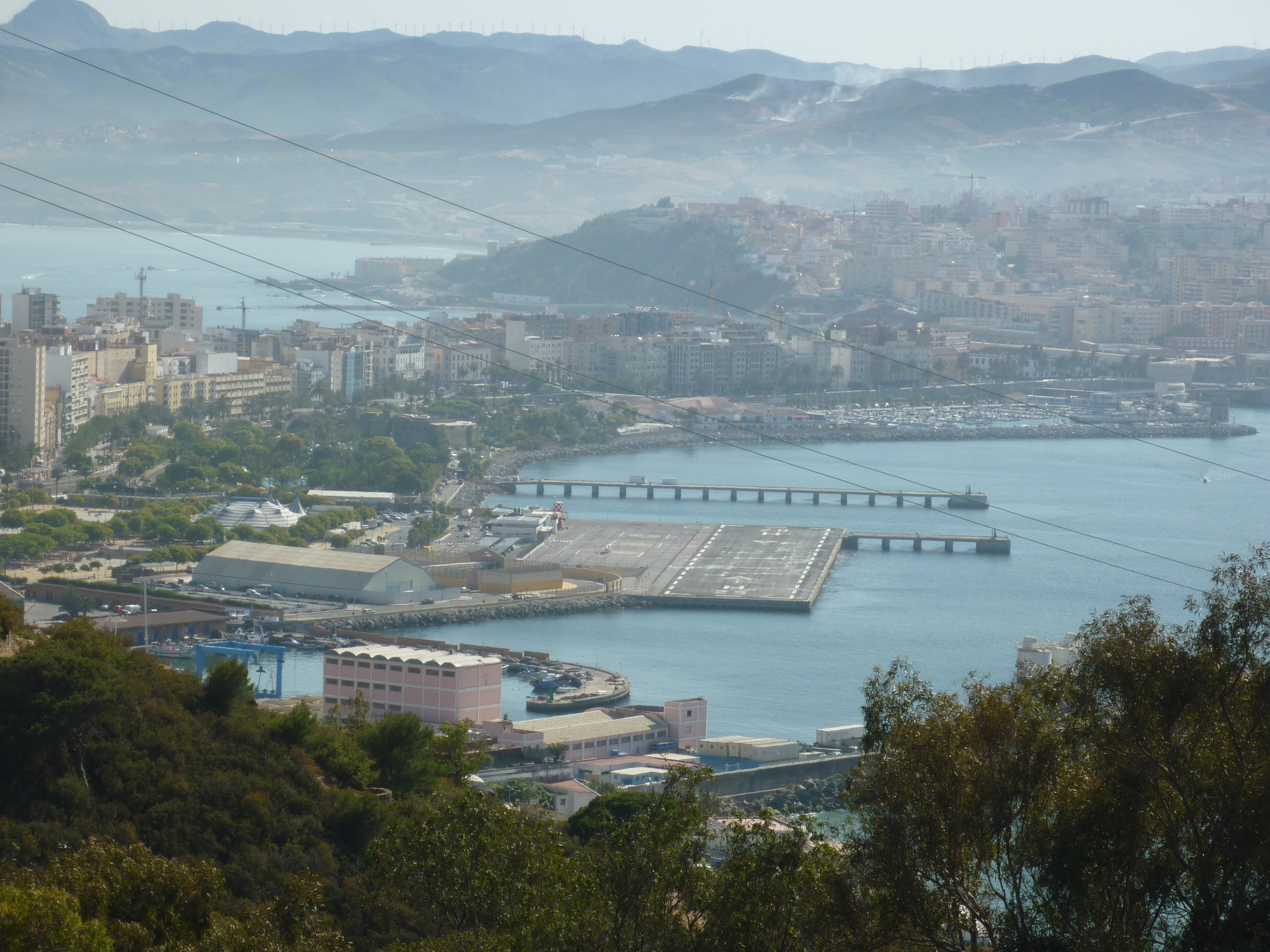
- IATA: JCU; ICAO: GECE

Summary
- Airport type: Public
- Owner/Operator: AENA
- Serves: Ceuta
- Elevation AMSL: 2 m (6.6 ft)
- Coordinates: 35°53′33″N 005°18′21″W
- Website: aena.es

Map
- Location of airport in Spain

Helipads
Number	Length		Surface
Number	m	ft	Surface
H07/H25	253x42	830x138	Asphalt

Statistics (2019)
- Passengers: 71,654
- Passenger change 18-19: ▲37.3%
- Aircraft movements: 6,846
- Movements change 18-19: ▲31.3%
- Source: AENA

Ceuta Heliport (Spanish: Helipuerto de Ceuta) (IATA: JCU, ICAO: GECE) is the heliport, and only air transport facility, serving the Spanish autonomous city of Ceuta, in North Africa.

== Overview ==
Since 9 January 2004, it has been possible to fly between Ceuta and Málaga by helicopter. This heliport is the first in Spain to be constructed and managed by AENA in order to secure accessibility to the autonomous city by air. A rapid connection with the mainland is considered vital for the development of the Ceutan economy.

The heliport is situated in the port of Ceuta, between the cargo dock and the fishing port, on land reclaimed from the sea in the north of the city. The heliport consists of three helipads, a short runway, a two-storey terminal building, a power station and a fire station.

This infrastructure is key to Ceuta because it allowed passengers to access to Málaga airport (mainland Spain's fourth airport by number of passengers), giving Ceuta access to all cities served from Málaga.

The former ICAO code of Ceuta was GECT. It was changed in mid-2009.

== Routes and services ==
The route was covered by Helicópteros del Sureste, a transport company based in Mutxamel, Alicante. The regular service operated since 1996, linking the city of Ceuta with Málaga Airport in thirty minutes. This route serves more than 20,000 annually, in approximately 2,600 flights. The helicopters used were the most recent versions of the AW139 which have a capacity of up to 15 passengers. It is due to become the main destination for helicopters leaving Algeciras Heliport.

== Airlines and destinations ==
As of 2025, The heliport was served by only one helicopter airline, Hélity to two routes, including Algeciras and Málaga

Airlines	Destinations
Hélity	Algeciras, Málaga

== Statistics ==
In its second year of operation, the heliport served 20,233 passengers, and handled 2,656 operations and 4.6 tonnes of cargo.

== See also ==
- Melilla Airport - the only airport in Spanish territory on the African coast
- Sania Ramel Airport - the closest airport to Ceuta
