= ENAIRE =

Spanish air navigation service provider

ENAIRE [AENA]

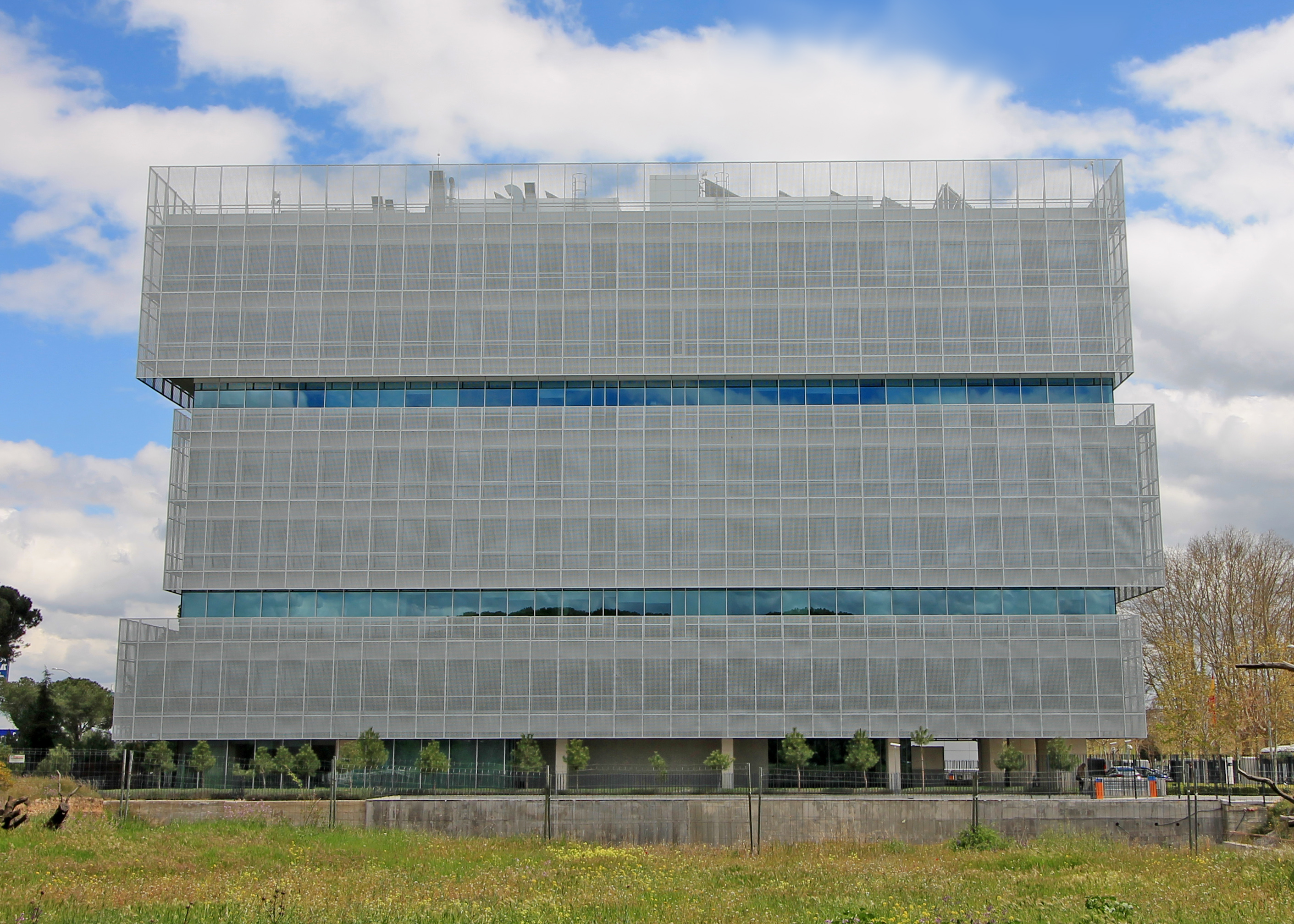
- Old Headquarters in Madrid, Spain
- Traded as: BMAD: AENA; IBEX 35
- ISIN: ES0105046009
- Industry: Aviation
- Founded: 14 June 1991 (as AENA)
- Headquarters: Madrid, Spain
- Area served: Spain
- Key people: Pedro Saura Garcia, Chairman
- Services: Air Traffic Management
- Revenue: ▲€6.4 billion (2024)
- Operating income: ▲€1.99 billion (2024)
- Total assets: ▼€18.36 billion (2024)
- Owner: Government of Spain
- Number of employees: ▲15,022 (2024)
- Website: enaire.es

Enaire or AENA is the air navigation manager in Spain, certified for the provision of enroute, approach and aerodrome control services. As a public corporate entity attached to the Spanish Ministry of Public Works, it is responsible for air traffic control, aeronautical information and the communication, navigation and surveillance networks so air companies and their aircraft can fly safely and in an organised format within Spanish airspace.

By volume of air traffic, ENAIRE is the fourth largest air navigation service provider in Europe, with approximately 2 million flights per year. ENAIRE manages 2.2 million km^{2} of airspace from five air control centres and 21 control towers.

ENAIRE controls a complex airspace of over 2,000,000 km^{2}, including one continental area and oceanic area. It also handles flights entering Europe from America and Africa, as Spain is the port of entry linking traffic from these destinations with Europe, Germany, France and the United Kingdom. ENAIRE adapts to the seasonal nature of air traffic in Spain, where there is a considerably larger number of flights during the summer months. Spain is recorded to have the third-largest number of tourists in the world.

ENAIRE participates in projects of the European Union related to the implementation of the Single European Sky, such as the group A6 and the European joint undertaking iTEC (with Indra and the air navigation providers NATS (United Kingdom), DFS (Germany), LVNL (Netherlands), Avinor (Norway), PANSA (Poland) and Oro Navigacija (Lithuania). ENAIRE is also a full member of CANSO.

ENAIRE owns 51% of the capital of AENA S.A., the world's largest airport manager, with a network of 78 airports and 2 heliports. These include Madrid-Barajas, Barcelona-El Prat, Palma de Mallorca and Málaga-Costa del Sol. This network records more than 384 million passengers per year. In addition, AENA S.A. participates in the management of 15 further airports in Brazil, Colombia, Jamaica, Mexico and the United Kingdom.

== Duties ==
Under the Act 09/2010, ENAIRE is the company designated by the State for the supply of air traffic services in the en-route and approach phases.

ENAIRE performs the following air navigation functions:

- The planning, management, coordination, operation, maintenance and administration of air traffic, the services of telecommunications and aeronautical information, as well as the infrastructure, facilities and communications networks of the air navigation system. The aim is to ensure that the aircraft moving around Spanish airspace obtain the utmost security, fluidity, efficiency and punctuality.
- The preparation and approval of different kinds of projects, as well as the implementation and management of investment control.
- Evaluation of the needs and proposals for new infrastructure, as well as possible modifications to the structure of the airspace.
- Participation in specific aeronautical training, subject to the concession of official licenses.

ENAIRE provides air navigation services using the following equipment and installations:

- 5 control centres (Barcelona, Canary Islands, Madrid, Palma de Mallorca and Seville).
- 21 control towers (Adolfo Suárez-Madrid Barajas, Almería, Asturias, Barcelona-El Prat, Bilbao, Girona-Costa Brava, Gran Canaria, Federico García Lorca Granada-Jaén, Palma de Mallorca, Málaga-Costa del Sol, Melilla, Menorca, Reus, San Sebastián, Santiago de Compostela, Seve Ballesteros-Santander, Tenerife Norte, Tenerife Sur and Vitoria).
- 136 radio aids supporting navigation en route.
- 50 radio aids providing airport guidance.
- 49 en route surveillance systems, in airport proximities and on the ground at airfields.
- 18 communications centres to cover Ground/Ground and Ground/Air communications.
- 83 communications nodes for data transmission.

ENAIRE performs the national and international operational coordination of the Spanish air traffic management network through efficient airspace management, taking into account respect for the environment and the needs of users.

These services are provided from the five regional directorates of ENAIRE: Centre-North, East, South, Canary Islands and Balearic Islands, whose headquarters lie respectively in the control centres (ACC) of Madrid, Barcelona, Seville, Gran Canaria and Palma de Mallorca.

== History ==
In 1958, under the Act of 26 December 1958, the National Airports Executive was created as a corporation of public law of an autonomous nature, attached to the Air Ministry, which, as a consequence of the Act of 26 December 1958, on the Juridical Regime for Autonomous State Entities, became the Autonomous National Airport Authority (OAAN).

As a consequence of the Air Navigation Act, the OAAN was created, attached to the Air Ministry and dependent on the Subsecretariat for Civil aviation. In 1963 the Subsecretariat for Civil aviation was created within the Air Ministry (still a military authority), to which the OAAN was attached.

Spain signed an agreement with Eurocontrol as an associate state in 1972. The Autonomous National Airport Authority, dependent upon the Air Ministry, signed a convention with Eurocontrol in consideration for the use of the Air Navigation Facilities Network.

In 1977, the creation of the Ministry for Transport and Communications entailed the integration of the Subsecretariat for Civil Aviation into the national civil service.

In 1982 the disappearance of the Subsecretariat for Civil Aviation gave place to the creation of the General Directorate for Civil Aviation (DGAC), which took on the legislative and regulatory powers, as well as those of air navigation. OAAN became part of the Ministry for Transport, Tourism and Communications).

=== Creation of the public entity Aeropuertos Españoles y Navegación Aérea (AENA) ===
Under the Royal Decree 905/1991, of 14 June, the statute of the public entity AENA (acronym: Spanish Airports and Air Navigation) was approved, and this came into force on 19 June 1991, the day following its publication in the Official Spanish Gazette (BOE). The directives for action by the new entity were set by the Government through the then Ministry for Transport, Tourism and Communications, today the Ministry for Public Works, and competences for management of the network of Spanish airports, air navigation facilities and support networks and control over air traffic were entrusted to it.

On 29 June 1990, in application of Art. 82 of the Act 4/1990, of 29 June 1990, the public entity Aeropuertos Españoles y Navegación Aérea (AENA), attached to the Ministry for Transport, Tourism and Communications, was created.

On 2 November 1991 it began to provide airport services and, one years later, on 2 November 1992, AENA started to provide services related to air navigation.

=== SACTA put into service at the Air Control Centres ===
Development having got under way in 1984, the operational system SACTA (Automated Air Traffic Control System), is owned by ENAIRE and was developed by Indra. SACTA was put into service at the Control Centre of Palma de Mallorca in the year 1990. In 1991, it came into service at the Air Traffic Control Centre of Madrid and, in 1992, at the Air Traffic Control Centre of Seville as well. At the Air Traffic Control Centres of Barcelona and Canary Islands, it was installed in 1994.

=== Entry of Spain into Eurocontrol ===
In 1997 Spain joined Eurocontrol as a full member.

=== New air traffic control centres ===
On 19 June 2001, the new Air Traffic Control Centre of Seville, replacing the former one situated at El Judío, came into operation. The Air Traffic Control Centre of Seville was the very first in Spain, its history stretching back to the year 1952.

On 23 February 2005, the new Air Traffic Control Centre of Barcelona came into operation, replacing the former one situated at Gavá.

=== First flight plan system at European level ===
AENA, DFS and NATS, the air navigation service providers of Spain, Germany and the United Kingdom, signed an agreement to develop, jointly, the first flight plan system at a European level.

=== Liberalisation of aerodrome control ===
On 14 April 2010, the Act 9/2010 was published, regulating the provision of air traffic services, and the obligations of civil providers of such services are established, in addition to setting certain working conditions for civil air traffic controllers. This Act liberalised aerodrome control services.

The airport of Lleida-Alguaire began operations in 2010 and was the first autonomous region airport, outside the AENA network, to receive air navigation services from AENA, later on handled by ENAIRE.

=== Separation between AENA Aeropuertos S.A. and AENA public corporate entity (EPE) ===
By resolution of the Cabinet on 25 February 2011, the company AENA Aeropuertos was created, pursuant to the Legislative Royal Decree 13, of 3 December 2010, of actions in the fiscal, occupational and liberalising areas to encourage investment and the creation of employment, and which included, in its legislative text, the modernisation of the airport system through the implantation of a new management model.

By Ministerial Order of 7 June 2011, the commencement of the activity of AENA Aeropuertos, SA. was approved, to which entity all the duties and obligations previously exercised by the public corporate entity AENA in relation to the management and operation of airport services were entrusted.

Service provision agreement between AENA Aeropuertos S.A. and AENA (Public Corporate Entity).

On 18 January 2012, José Manuel Vargas Gómez was appointed managing director-Chairman of the Public Corporate Entity Aeropuertos Españoles y Navegación Aérea (AENA).

=== Agreement between Spain and Portugal on functional airspace blocks ===
On 17 March 2013 Spain and Portugal signed the agreement to establish the south-west airspace. Signed by the Minister for Public Works, Ana Pastor Julián, and the Minister for the Economy and Employment of Portugal, Álvaro Santos Pereira, the agreement established a functional block for the management of the airspaces of Spain and Portugal (SW FAB – south-west zone of Europe).

=== The public corporate entity Aeropuertos Españoles y Navegación Aérea (AENA) becomes ENAIRE ===
The public corporate entity Aeropuertos Españoles y Navegación Aérea (AENA) changed its name to ENAIRE (Legislative Royal Decree 8, of 4 July 2014). ENAIRE continues with the same nature and juridical regime envisaged for the public corporate entity AENA, holding exclusive competences in relation to air navigation and airspace, as well as national and international operational coordination of the national air traffic management network. In addition, ENAIRE holds 51% of the shares of AENA S.A., which has been listed on the Stock Exchange since 11 February 2015.

The Secretary of State for Infrastructure, Transport and Housing, Rafael Catalá Polo, became chairman of the Public Corporate Entity ENAIRE on 15 July 2014. With his subsequent appointment as Minister for Justice under the Royal Decree 851/2014 of 3 October, Julio Gómez-Pomar Rodríguez was appointed Secretary of State for Infrastructure, Transport and Housing and also assumed the chairmanship of ENAIRE.

=== AENA Aeropuertos becomes AENA S.A. ===
Under the Legislative Royal Decree 8, of 4 July 2014, the change of name of the company AENA Aeropuertos, S.A., to AENA, S.A., took place. ENAIRE possesses 51% of its shares.

=== iTEC agreement between ENAIRE, DFS, NATS, LVNL and Indra ===
The agreement to form the Group iTEC (Interoperability Through European Collaboration) was signed by the air navigation providers of Spain (ENAIRE), Germany (DFS), the United Kingdom (NATS) and Holland (LVNL), and the Spanish company Indra, for the development of the future air controller post in Europe.

=== Appointment of Ángel Luis Arias Serrano ===
On 19 May 2015, Ángel Luis Arias Serrano (Madrid, 1960) was appointed managing director of ENAIRE by the board of directors of the public corporate entity ENAIRE. Between January 2012 and his appointment as managing director of ENAIRE, Ángel Luis Arias occupied the post of Director General of Civil Aviation, in the course of which he exercised the duties of Chairman of the Governing Board of the Spanish Air Safety Agency (AESA) and he has been a member of the boards of directors of ENAIRE and Senasa, as well as vice-chairman of the European Organisation for the Safety of Air Navigation (EUROCONTROL).

=== New president ===
In June 2018, Julio Gómez-Pomar Rodríguez was dismissed as Secretary of State for Infrastructure, Transport and Housing with the publication of Royal Decree 506/2018, of 18 June, and the publication on the same day of Royal Decree 511 / 2018, of 18 June, whereby Pedro Saura García, Secretary of State for Infrastructure, Transport and Housing, is appointed, then becomes president of ENAIRE. In accordance with the Royal Decree-Law 8/2014, of 4 July, concerning the governing bodies of the ENAIRE Public Business Entity, the position of President of the same will fall to the Secretary of State for Infrastructure, Transport and Housing.

== Subsidiaries ==
=== AENA ===
ENAIRE owns 51% of AENA (Aeropuertos Españoles y Navegación Aérea), a network of 78 airports and 2 heliports in Spain and abroad. AENA operates all the airports of public interest in Spain and some air bases on a mixed basis with the Armed Forces. Also worth noting are Ceuta Heliport and Algeciras Heliport, the only heliports of the network.

AENA logo history

1991–2011: First AENA logo, introduced in June 1991

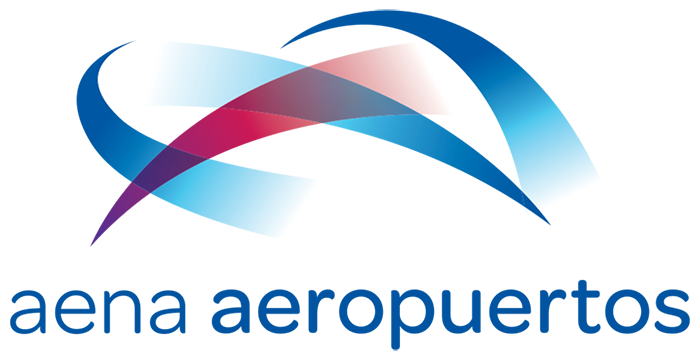
2011–2014: Second AENA logo, introduced in 2011

2014–present: Third AENA logo, introduced in August 2014

=== Ineco ===
As of this writing ENAIRE holds 45.85% of public shares in INECO ("Transport Engineering and Economics") with the remainder of the shares distributed between Renfe Operadora (12.78%) and Adif (41.37%). INECO specialises in conducting studies and projects linked to the transport and telecommunications sector. Created more than forty years ago, it has participated in all the major infrastructure projects for airports, railways and roads undertaken in Spain and many others internationally.

=== Crida ===
With the legal personality of an Economic Interest Grouping, ENAIRE (66.66%), Ineco (16.67%) and the Polytechnic University of Madrid (16.67%), have constituted the "ATM Research, Development and Innovation Reference Centre" (Crida) to engage in R&D+I activities in the area of air traffic management (ATM) aimed at improving performance (in particular safety, capacity and economic and environmental efficiency) of the Spanish air navigation system, as an integral part of a global system.

In addition, ENAIRE holds stakes in: EMGRISA (0.08%), Grupo Navegación por Satélite Sistemas y Servicios S.L. (19.3%), GroupEAD (36%) and Barcelona Regional (11.76%).

== See also ==
- Aeronautical Information Service
- Aviation safety
- Civil Air Navigation Services Organisation
- Eurocontrol
- List of airports in Spain
