= Algeciras Heliport =

Spanish heliport near Gibraltar

Algeciras Heliport Helipuerto de Algeciras
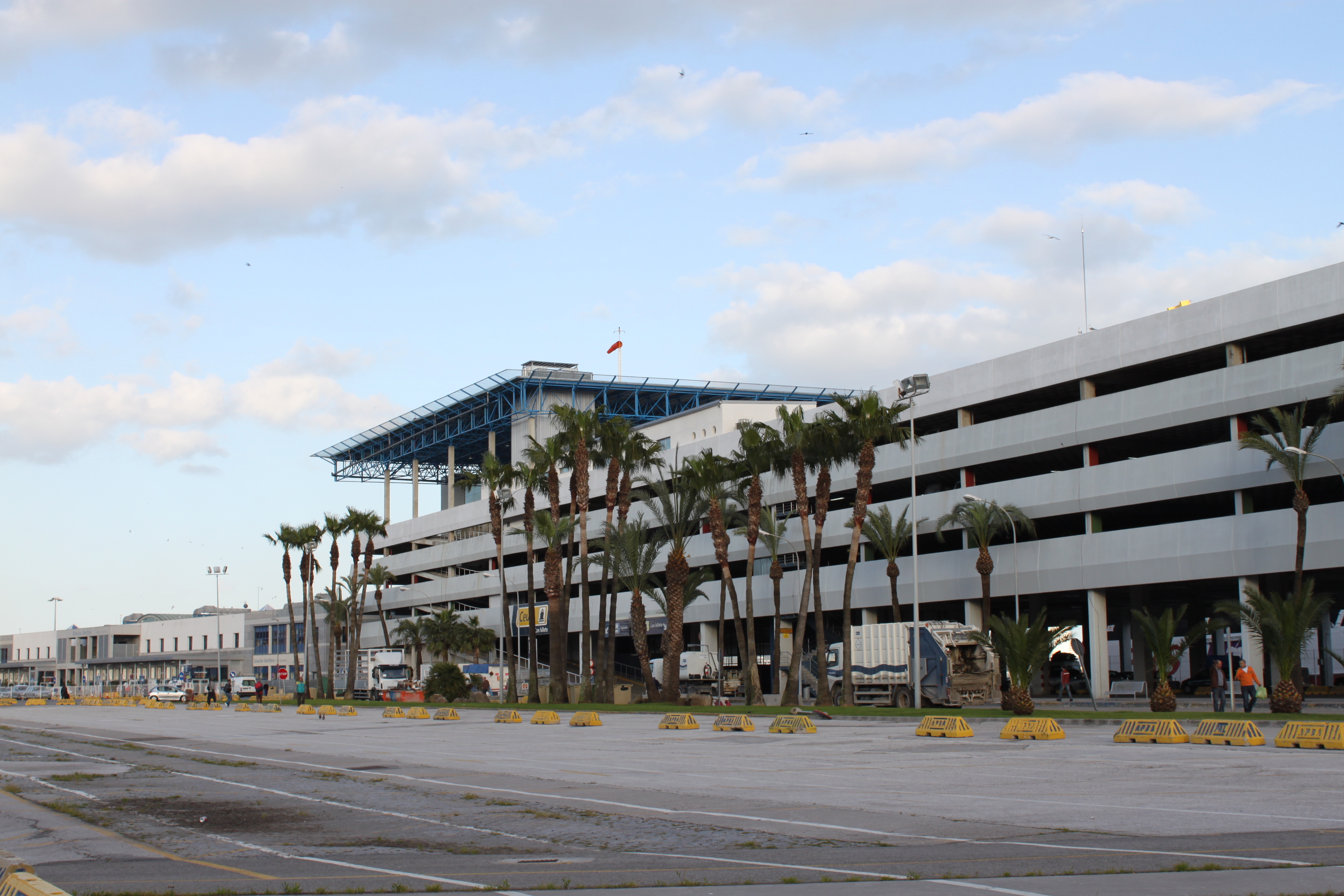
- IATA: none; ICAO: LEAG

Summary
- Airport type: Public
- Owner/Operator: AENA
- Serves: Algeciras, Spain
- Elevation AMSL: 30 m / 98 ft
- Coordinates: 36°07′44″N 05°26′28″W

Map
- Location within Spain

Helipads
| Number | Length | | Surface |
| Number | m | ft | Surface |
|---|---|---|---|
| H01 | | | Asphalt |

Statistics (2013)
- Passengers: 2,938
- Passenger change 12-13: ▼67%
- Aircraft movements: 682
- Movements change 12-13: ▼38.3%

The Algeciras Heliport (Spanish: Helipuerto de Algeciras) is a public heliport in Algeciras (Cádiz, Spain). It was inaugurated on July 1, 2010, by the Minister of Development, José Blanco. It was the second helipad of the network AENA after Ceuta Heliport. Construction had started in February 2009. It provides transport to Ceuta and other areas in the Campo de Gibraltar. The only airport existing in the area is the one in the neighbouring British Overseas Territory of Gibraltar.

It was expected to begin operation in July 2010. The heliport is located on the current parking building of the Port of Algeciras. The setup of the heliport has involved the extension of an existing building and the ground keeping an area of 32 × 24 meters to take off the vehicle and a safe area of 8 × 5 meters. It is supplemented by the service units for rescue and firefighting and various units of maintenance. The helicopter used in the city will be a model Bell 412 EP that will allow communication with the city of Ceuta in just 10 minutes.

The heliport platform is 2,400 m^{2} and a height of 30 meters above sea level. The passenger terminal is located in the Passenger Terminal Building.

== Facilities ==
The heliport is divided into two parts: the passenger terminal and the launch pad for landing. The passenger terminal is part of the port of Algeciras, which has adapted an area to meet the needs of the heliport. This platform has 2,400 m^{2} and is located 30 m. The terminal and platform are connected by covered outdoor walkways. The cost was more than 7 million euros.

It is located 500 meters from the station and bus station in Algeciras.

== Services ==
The heliport uses the services and parking of the Port of Algeciras. It does not have deposits of fuel for helicopters due to lack of space, so refueling cannot be done here.

== Airlines and destinations ==
| Airlines | Destinations |
|---|---|
| Hélity | Ceuta |

== See also ==
- Málaga Airport
- Gibraltar Airport
- Jerez Airport
