= List of the busiest airports in Spain =

This is a list of the busiest airports in Spain, including airports in the Balearic Islands and the Canary Islands. Data is compiled from statistics published by Aena, the public body that owns and operates the majority of airports in the country.

== 30 busiest airports in Spain by passenger traffic ==
=== 2025 ===
The following is a list of the 30 busiest Spanish airports in 2025, from AENA statistics.

Rank	Airport	IATA	Location	Total passengers	Annual change	Rank change
1	Adolfo Suárez Madrid–Barajas	MAD	Madrid	68,179,054	▲3.0%	Steady
2	Barcelona–El Prat Josep Tarradellas	BCN	Barcelona	57,483,036	▲4.4%	Steady
3	Palma de Mallorca	PMI	Palma de Mallorca	33,806,427	▲1.5%	Steady
4	Málaga–Costa Del Sol	AGP	Málaga	26,760,549	▲7.4%	Steady
5	Alicante–Elche Miguel Hernández	ALC	Alicante	19,950,394	▲4.0%	Steady
6	Gran Canaria	LPA	Gran Canaria	15,826,553	▲1.7%	Steady
7	Tenerife South	TFS	Tenerife	13,969,678	▲1.7%	Steady
8	Valencia	VLC	Valencia	11,847,527	▲9.6%	Steady
9	Sevilla	SVQ	Sevilla	9,686,487	▲5.6%	Steady
10	Ibiza	IBZ	Ibiza	9,138,224	▲0.7%	Steady
11	Lanzarote-César Manrique	ACE	Lanzarote	8,920,901	▲2.4%	Steady
12	Tenerife North-Ciudad de La Laguna	TFN	Tenerife	7,174,977	▲6.1%	▲1
13	Bilbao	BIO	Bilbao	7,062,681	▲4.2%	▼1
14	Fuerteventura	FUE	Fuerteventura	6,886,935	▲6.8%	Steady
15	Menorca	MAH	Menorca	4,210,152	▲0.9%	Steady
16	Santiago-Rosalía de Castro	SCQ	Santiago de Compostela	3,120,759	▼14.3%	Steady
17	Girona-Costa Brava	GRO	Girona	2,185,561	▲9.4%	Steady
18	Asturias	OVD	Avilés	2,051,342	▲2.9%	Steady
19	La Palma	SPC	La Palma	1,533,355	▲2.5%	Steady
20	Reus	REU	Reus	1,336,826	▲13.1%	▲1
21	A Coruña	LCG	A Coruña	1,292,166	▲4.4%	▼1
22	Federico García Lorca Granada–Jaén	GRX	Granada	1,152,872	▲1.7%	Steady
23	Vigo	VGO	Vigo	1,114,810	▲5.3%	▲1
24	Seve Ballesteros-Santander	SDR	Santander	1,069,390	▼2.4%	▼1
25	Región de Murcia	RMU	Murcia	949,007	▲4.3%	▲1
26	Jerez de la Frontera	XRY	Jerez de la Frontera	884,539	▼6.9%	▼1
27	Almería	LEI	Almería	801,689	▲1.9%	Steady
28	Zaragoza	ZAZ	Zaragoza	707,493	▲1.9%	Steady
29	Melilla	MLN	Melilla	532,485	▲4.8%	Steady
30	San Sebastián	EAS	San Sebastián	472,666	▼2.8%	Steady
Total	For all ~50 reported airports			321,587,316	▲3.9%	

=== 2024 ===
The following is a list of the 30 busiest Spanish airports in 2024, from AENA statistics.

Rank	Airport	IATA	Location	Total passengers	Annual change	Rank change
1	Adolfo Suárez Madrid–Barajas	MAD	Madrid	66,197,066	▲9.9%	Steady
2	Barcelona–El Prat Josep Tarradellas	BCN	Barcelona	55,037,892	▲10.3%	Steady
3	Palma de Mallorca	PMI	Palma de Mallorca	33,298,379	▲7.0%	Steady
4	Málaga–Costa Del Sol	AGP	Málaga	24,924,219	▲11.5%	Steady
5	Alicante–Elche Miguel Hernández	ALC	Alicante	18,388,543	▲16.8%	Steady
6	Gran Canaria	LPA	Gran Canaria	15,219,843	▲9.0%	Steady
7	Tenerife South	TFS	Tenerife	13,741,355	▲11.4%	Steady
8	Valencia	VLC	Valencia	10,811,963	▲8.7%	Steady
9	Sevilla	SVQ	Sevilla	9,175,759	▲13.7%	▲2
10	Ibiza	IBZ	Ibiza	9,073,223	▲1.6%	▼1
11	Lanzarote-César Manrique	ACE	Lanzarote	8,714,439	▲6.1%	▼1
12	Bilbao	BIO	Bilbao	6,777,645	▲7.0%	Steady
13	Tenerife North-Ciudad de La Laguna	TFN	Tenerife	6,765,619	▲10.5%	Steady
14	Fuerteventura	FUE	Fuerteventura	6,445,952	▲7.1%	Steady
15	Menorca	MAH	Menorca	4,172,691	▲3.2%	Steady
16	Santiago-Rosalía de Castro	SCQ	Santiago de Compostela	3,640,519	▲2.9%	Steady
17	Girona-Costa Brava	GRO	Girona	1,998,021	▲25.9%	▲1
18	Asturias	OVD	Avilés	1,993,063	▲0.9%	▼1
19	La Palma	SPC	La Palma	1,496,133	▲9.3%	Steady
20	A Coruña	LCG	A Coruña	1,237,570	▼1.2%	Steady
21	Reus	REU	Reus	1,181,514	▲13.0%	▲2
22	Federico García Lorca Granada–Jaén	GRX	Granada	1,133,554	▲9.1%	▲2
23	Seve Ballesteros-Santander	SDR	Santander	1,095,398	▼11.8%	▼2
24	Vigo	VGO	Vigo	1,058,529	▼6.8%	▼2
25	Jerez de la Frontera	XRY	Jerez de la Frontera	949,726	▲5.0%	Steady
26	Región de Murcia	RMU	Murcia	909,821	▲3.6%	Steady
27	Almería	LEI	Almería	786,931	▲1.5%	Steady
28	Zaragoza	ZAZ	Zaragoza	694,237	▲1.2%	Steady
29	Melilla	MLN	Melilla	507,987	▲1.4%	Steady
30	San Sebastián	EAS	San Sebastián	486,494	▲0.8%	Steady
Total	For all ~50 reported airports			309,371,619	▲9,2%	

=== 2023 ===
The following is a list of the 30 busiest Spanish airports in 2023, from AENA statistics.

Rank	Airport	IATA	Location	Total passengers	Annual change	Rank change
1	Adolfo Suárez Madrid–Barajas	MAD	Madrid	60,221,163	▲18.9%	Steady
2	Barcelona–El Prat Josep Tarradellas	BCN	Barcelona	49,910,900	▲19.9%	Steady
3	Palma de Mallorca	PMI	Palma de Mallorca	31,106,165	▲8.9%	Steady
4	Málaga–Costa Del Sol	AGP	Málaga	22,344,261	▲21.1%	Steady
5	Alicante–Elche Miguel Hernández	ALC	Alicante	15,747,699	▲19.2%	Steady
6	Gran Canaria	LPA	Gran Canaria	13,961,507	▲12.4%	Steady
7	Tenerife South	TFS	Tenerife	12,337,325	▲14.0%	Steady
8	Valencia	VLC	Valencia	9,948,261	▲22.8%	▲1
9	Ibiza	IBZ	Ibiza	8,931,574	▲9.5%	▼1
10	Lanzarote-César Manrique	ACE	Lanzarote	8,213,259	▲11.7%	Steady
11	Sevilla	SVQ	Sevilla	8,071,524	▲19.1%	Steady
12	Bilbao	BIO	Bilbao	6,336,365	▲23.5%	▲2
13	Tenerife North-Ciudad de La Laguna	TFN	Tenerife	6,120,505	▲10.0%	Steady
14	Fuerteventura	FUE	Fuerteventura	6,020,403	▲6.7%	▼2
15	Menorca	MAH	Menorca	4,045,211	▲3.7%	Steady
16	Santiago-Rosalía de Castro	SCQ	Santiago de Compostela	3,537,447	▲9.2%	Steady
17	Asturias	OVD	Avilés	1,974,847	▲35.7%	Steady
18	Girona-Costa Brava	GRO	Girona	1,586,458	▲20.7%	Steady
19	La Palma	SPC	La Palma	1,368,821	▲4.7%	Steady
20	A Coruña	LCG	A Coruña	1,252,022	▲29.9%	▲1
21	Seve Ballesteros-Santander	SDR	Santander	1,242,089	▲12.7%	▼1
22	Vigo	VGO	Vigo	1,136,159	▲19.2%	Steady
23	Reus	REU	Reus	1,045,425	▲14.7%	▲1
24	Federico García Lorca Granada–Jaén	GRX	Granada	1,039,423	▲14.4%	▲1
25	Jerez de la Frontera	XRY	Jerez de la Frontera	904,823	▼1.3%	▼2
26	Región de Murcia	RMU	Murcia	878,193	▲4.7%	Steady
27	Almería	LEI	Almería	775,385	▲10.2%	Steady
28	Zaragoza	ZAZ	Zaragoza	685,690	▲9.2%	Steady
29	Melilla	MLN	Melilla	501,069	▲12.0%	Steady
30	San Sebastián	EAS	San Sebastián	482,662	▲25.8%	Steady
Total	For all ~50 reported airports			283,201,865	▲16.2%	

=== 2022 ===
The following is a list of the 30 busiest Spanish airports in 2022, from AENA statistics.

Rank	Airport	IATA	Location	Total passengers	Annual change	Rank change
1	Adolfo Suárez Madrid–Barajas	MAD	Madrid	50,633,759	▲109.8%	Steady
2	Barcelona–El Prat Josep Tarradellas	BCN	Barcelona	41,641,444	▲120.6%	Steady
3	Palma de Mallorca	PMI	Palma de Mallorca	28,573,350	▲97.1%	Steady
4	Málaga–Costa Del Sol	AGP	Málaga	18,458,006	▲108.0%	Steady
5	Alicante–Elche Miguel Hernández	ALC	Alicante	13,206,430	▲126.1%	▲1
6	Gran Canaria	LPA	Gran Canaria	12,417,604	▲80.0%	▼1
7	Tenerife South	TFS	Tenerife	10,821,476	▲134.9%	▲1
8	Ibiza	IBZ	Ibiza	8,156,708	▲68.1%	▼1
9	Valencia	VLC	Valencia	8,114,821	▲99.0%	Steady
10	Lanzarote-César Manrique	ACE	Lanzarote	7,350,648	▲113.8%	▲2
11	Sevilla	SVQ	Sevilla	6,779,453	▲96.8%	Steady
12	Fuerteventura	FUE	Fuerteventura	5,641,500	▲81.2%	▲1
13	Tenerife North-Ciudad de La Laguna	TFN	Tenerife	5,566,245	▲44.9%	▼3
14	Bilbao	BIO	Bilbao	5,129,584	▲98.7%	Steady
15	Menorca	MAH	Menorca	3,900,935	▲67.8%	Steady
16	Santiago-Rosalía de Castro	SCQ	Santiago de Compostela	3,238,531	▲95.8%	Steady
17	Asturias	OVD	Avilés	1,454,917	▲74.9%	Steady
18	Girona-Costa Brava	GRO	Girona	1,314,441	▲321.0%	▲8
19	La Palma	SPC	La Palma	1,306,822	▲71.7%	▼1
20	Seve Ballesteros-Santander	SDR	Santander	1,102,439	▲119.0%	▲1
21	A Coruña	LCG	A Coruña	963,952	▲62.1%	▼2
22	Vigo	VGO	Vigo	953,170	▲73.6%	▼2
23	Jerez de la Frontera	XRY	Jerez de la Frontera	916,464	▲108.9%	Steady
24	Reus	REU	Reus	911,822	▲473.9%	▲6
25	Federico García Lorca Granada–Jaén	GRX	Granada	908,710	▲80.8%	▼3
26	Región de Murcia	RMU	Murcia	839,166	▲196.0%	▲1
27	Almería	LEI	Almería	703,380	▲121.5%	▼2
28	Zaragoza	ZAZ	Zaragoza	627,837	▲125.5%	Steady
29	Melilla	MLN	Melilla	447,450	▲34.6%	▼5
30	San Sebastián	EAS	San Sebastián	383,579	▲146.9%	▲1
Total	For all ~50 reported airports			243,693,689	▲103.2%	

=== 2021 ===
The following is a list of the 30 busiest Spanish airports in 2021, from Aena statistics.

Rank	Airport	IATA	Location	Total passengers	Annual change	Rank change
1	Adolfo Suárez Madrid–Barajas	MAD	Madrid	24,135,039	▲41.0%	Steady
2	Barcelona–El Prat Josep Tarradellas	BCN	Barcelona	18,875,461	▲48.2%	Steady
3	Palma de Mallorca	PMI	Palma de Mallorca	14,497,159	▲137.3%	Steady
4	Málaga–Costa Del Sol	AGP	Málaga	8,874,635	▲71.9%	Steady
5	Gran Canaria	LPA	Gran Canaria	6,899,523	▲34.4%	Steady
6	Alicante–Elche Miguel Hernández	ALC	Alicante	5,841,144	▲56.2%	Steady
7	Ibiza	IBZ	Ibiza	4,851,941	▲129.9%	▲6
8	Tenerife South	TFS	Tenerife	4,606,911	▲35.8%	▼1
9	Valencia	VLC	Valencia	4,078,485	▲64.0%	▲1
10	Tenerife North-Ciudad de La Laguna	TFN	Tenerife	3,840,160	▲37.3%	▼2
11	Sevilla	SVQ	Sevilla	3,444,465	▲48.7%	Steady
12	Lanzarote-César Manrique	ACE	Lanzarote	3,438,219	▲35.5%	▼3
13	Fuerteventura	FUE	Fuerteventura	3,114,105	▲45.2%	▼1
14	Bilbao	BIO	Bilbao	2,581,064	▲52.7%	Steady
15	Menorca	MAH	Menorca	2,325,323	▲115.9%	Steady
16	Santiago-Rosalía de Castro	SCQ	Santiago de Compostela	1,653,663	▲76.8%	Steady
17	Asturias	OVD	Avilés	831,791	▲66.7%	▲1
18	La Palma	SPC	La Palma	761,111	▲5.5%	▼1
19	A Coruña	LCG	A Coruña	594,584	▲36.1%	Steady
20	Vigo	VGO	Vigo	549,094	▲80.9%	▲2
21	Seve Ballesteros-Santander	SDR	Santander	503,466	▲50.2%	Steady
22	Federico García Lorca Granada–Jaén	GRX	Granada	502,590	▲28.8%	▼2
23	Jerez de la Frontera	XRY	Jerez de la Frontera	438,766	▲102.8%	▲1
24	Melilla	MLN	Melilla	332,446	▲69.9%	▲2
25	Almería	LEI	Almería	317,509	▲58.4%	Steady
26	Girona-Costa Brava	GRO	Girona	312,230	▲81.3%	▲3
27	Región de Murcia	RMU	Murcia	283,488	▲30.1%	▼4
28	Zaragoza	ZAZ	Zaragoza	278,449	▲61.6%	Steady
29	El Hierro	VDE	El Hierro	234,406	▲31.3%	▼2
30	Reus	REU	Reus	158,887	▲302.7%	▲6
Total	For all ~50 reported airports			119,952,578	▲57.7%	

=== 2020 ===
The following is a list of the 30 busiest Spanish airports in 2020, from Aena statistics. The large decrease in passenger numbers was caused by travel restrictions imposed in response to the COVID-19 pandemic.

Rank	Airport	IATA	Location	Total passengers	Annual change	Rank change
1	Adolfo Suárez Madrid–Barajas	MAD	Madrid	17,112,246	▼72.3%	Steady
2	Barcelona–El Prat	BCN	Barcelona	12,738,769	▼75.8%	Steady
3	Palma de Mallorca	PMI	Palma de Mallorca	6,108,514	▼79.4%	Steady
4	Málaga–Costa Del Sol	AGP	Málaga	5,161,243	▼74.0%	Steady
5	Gran Canaria	LPA	Gran Canaria	5,134,252	▼61.3%	▲1
6	Alicante–Elche Miguel Hernández	ALC	Alicante	3,739,567	▼75.1%	▼1
7	Tenerife South	TFS	Tenerife	3,392,527	▼69.6%	Steady
8	Tenerife North-Ciudad de La Laguna	TFN	Tenerife	2,796,788	▼52.1%	▲5
9	Lanzarote-César Manrique	ACE	Lanzarote	2,538,345	▼65.2%	▲2
10	Valencia	VLC	Valencia	2,487,495	▼70.9%	▼2
11	Sevilla	SVQ	Sevilla	2,315,825	▼69.3%	▼1
12	Fuerteventura	FUE	Fuerteventura	2,144,695	▼61.9%	▲2
13	Ibiza	IBZ	Ibiza	2,110,348	▼74.1%	▼4
14	Bilbao	BIO	Bilbao	1,690,011	▼71.4%	▼2
15	Menorca	MAH	Menorca	1,076,952	▼69.2%	Steady
16	Santiago-Rosalía de Castro	SCQ	Santiago de Compostela	935,395	▼67.8%	Steady
17	La Palma	SPC	La Palma	721,298	▼51.4%	▲1
18	Asturias	OVD	Avilés	498,952	▼64.8%	▲1
19	A Coruña	LCG	A Coruña	436,775	▼67.7%	▲1
20	Federico García Lorca Granada–Jaén	GRX	Granada	390,312	▼68.8%	▲1
21	Seve Ballesteros-Santander	SDR	Santander	335,280	▼71.5%	▲1
22	Vigo	VGO	Vigo	303,466	▼70.0%	▲4
23	Región de Murcia	RMU	Murcia	217,912	▼80.0%	▲1
24	Jerez de la Frontera	XRY	Jerez de la Frontera	216,319	▼80.7%	▼1
25	Almería	LEI	Almería	200,411	▼79.5%	▲2
26	Melilla	MLN	Melilla	195,636	▼55.0%	▲3
27	El Hierro	VDE	El Hierro	178,595	▼33.6%	▲4
28	Zaragoza	ZAZ	Zaragoza	172,344	▼63.2%	Steady
29	Girona-Costa Brava	GRO	Girona	172,171	▼91.1%	▼12
30	Pamplona	PNA	Pamplona	84,059	▼65.5%	▲3
Total	For all ~50 reported airports			76,065,601	▼72.4%	

=== 2019 ===
The following is a list of the 30 busiest Spanish airports in 2019, from provisional AENA statistics.

Rank	Airport	IATA	Location	Total passengers	Annual change	Rank change
1	Adolfo Suárez Madrid–Barajas	MAD	Madrid	61,734,037	▲6.6%	Steady
2	Barcelona–El Prat	BCN	Barcelona	52,686,314	▲5.0%	Steady
3	Palma de Mallorca	PMI	Palma de Mallorca	29,721,123	▲2.2%	Steady
4	Málaga–Costa Del Sol	AGP	Málaga	19,856,299	▲4.4%	Steady
5	Alicante–Elche	ALC	Alicante	15,047,840	▲7.6%	Steady
6	Gran Canaria	LPA	Gran Canaria	13,261,405	▼2.3%	Steady
7	Tenerife South	TFS	Tenerife	11,168,506	▼1.1%	Steady
8	Valencia	VLC	Valencia	8,539,403	▲9.9%	▲1
9	Ibiza	IBZ	Ibiza	8,155,635	▲0.6%	▼1
10	Sevilla	SVQ	Sevilla	7,544,473	▲18.2%	▲1
11	Lanzarote	ACE	Lanzarote	7,292,720	▼0.5%	▼1
12	Bilbao	BIO	Bilbao	5,905,804	▲8.0%	▲2
13	Tenerife North	TFN	Tenerife	5,840,483	▲6.3%	Steady
14	Fuerteventura	FUE	Fuerteventura	5,635,330	▼7.9%	▼2
15	Menorca	MAH	Menorca	3,495,025	▼1.5%	Steady
16	Santiago de Compostela	SCQ	Santiago de Compostela	2,903,427	▲6.5%	Steady
17	Girona	GRO	Girona	1,932,255	▼4.4%	Steady
18	La Palma	SPC	La Palma	1,483,720	▲4.5%	Steady
19	Asturias	OVD	Avilés	1,417,433	▲1.2%	Steady
20	A Coruña	LCG	A Coruña	1,352,583	▲6.4%	▲1
21	Granada–Jaén	GRX	Granada	1,251,926	▲11.1%	▲2
22	Seve Ballesteros-Santander	SDR	Santander	1,174,896	▲6.5%	▲2
23	Jerez de la Frontera	XRY	Jerez de la Frontera	1,120,742	▼1.2%	▼2
24	Murcia-Corvera	RMU	Murcia	1,090,954	Steady	Steady
25	Reus	REU	Reus	1,046,062	▲0.8%	▲1
26	Vigo	VGO	Vigo	1,012,447	▼10.4%	▼3
27	Almería	LEI	Almería	978,997	▼1.3%	Steady
28	Zaragoza	ZAZ	Zaragoza	467,774	▼4.4%	Steady
29	Melilla	MLN	Melilla	434,660	▲24.9%	Steady
30	San Sebastián	EAS	San Sebastián	320,440	▲10.7%	Steady
Total	For all ~50 reported airports			275,237,801	▲4.4%	

=== 2018 ===
The following is a list of the 30 busiest Spanish airports in 2018, from provisional AENA statistics.

Rank	Airport	Location	Total passengers	Annual change	Rank change
1	Adolfo Suárez Madrid–Barajas	Madrid	57,891,340	▲8.4%	Steady
2	Barcelona–El Prat	Barcelona	50,172,457	▲6.1%	Steady
3	Palma de Mallorca	Palma de Mallorca	29,081,787	▲4.0%	Steady
4	Málaga–Costa Del Sol	Málaga	19,021,784	▲2.1%	Steady
5	Alicante–Elche	Alicante	13,981,320	▲2.0%	Steady
6	Gran Canaria	Gran Canaria	13,573,242	▲3.7%	Steady
7	Tenerife South	Tenerife	11,042,481	▼1.8%	Steady
8	Ibiza	Ibiza	8,104,316	▲2.5%	Steady
9	Valencia	Valencia	7,769,867	▲15.2%	▲1
10	Lanzarote	Lanzarote	7,327,019	▼0.8%	▼1
11	Sevilla	Sevilla	6,380,465	▲24.9%	▲1
12	Fuerteventura	Fuerteventura	6,118,893	▲1.2%	▼1
13	Tenerife North	Tenerife	5,493,994	▲16.7%	▲1
14	Bilbao	Bilbao	5,469,453	▲10.0%	▼1
15	Menorca	Menorca	3,442,752	▲0.2%	Steady
16	Santiago de Compostela	Santiago de Compostela	2,724,750	▲3.0%	Steady
17	Girona	Girona	2,019,876	▲3.8%	Steady
18	La Palma	La Palma	1,420,277	▲9.0%	▲1
19	Asturias	Avilés	1,400,481	▼0.5%	▼1
20	Murcia–San Javier	Murcia	1,273,424	▲6.4%	Steady
21	A Coruña	A Coruña	1,225,763	▲7.4%	Steady
22	Jerez	Jerez de la Frontera	1,133,621	▲8.3%	▲1
23	Vigo	Vigo	1,129,689	▲6.0%	▼1
24	Granada–Jaén	Granada	1,126,389	▲24.9%	▲3
25	Seve Ballesteros–Santander	Santander	1,103,353	▲17.7%	▲1
26	Reus	Reus	1,037,576	▲1.8%	▼2
27	Almería	Almería	992,043	▼1.5%	▼2
28	Zaragoza	Zaragoza	489,064	▲11.6%	Steady
29	Melilla	Melilla	348,121	▼7.3%	Steady
30	San Sebastián	San Sebastián	289,444	▲2.7%	Steady
Total	For all ~50 reported airports		263,753,406	▲5.8%	

=== 2017 ===
The following is a list of the 30 busiest Spanish airports in 2017, from provisional AENA statistics.

Rank	Airport	Location	Total passengers	Annual change	Rank change
1	Adolfo Suárez Madrid–Barajas	Madrid	53,402,506	▲5.9%	Steady
2	Barcelona–El Prat	Barcelona	47,284,500	▲7.1%	Steady
3	Palma de Mallorca	Palma de Mallorca	27,970,655	▲6.5%	Steady
4	Málaga–Costa Del Sol	Málaga	18,628,876	▲11.7%	Steady
5	Alicante–Elche	Alicante	13,713,061	▲11.1%	Steady
6	Gran Canaria	Gran Canaria	13,092,117	▲8.3%	Steady
7	Tenerife South	Tenerife	11,249,327	▲7.4%	Steady
8	Ibiza	Ibiza	7,903,892	▲6.6%	Steady
9	Lanzarote	Lanzarote	7,389,025	▲10.5%	Steady
10	Valencia	Valencia	6,745,394	▲16.3%	Steady
11	Fuerteventura	Fuerteventura	6,049,401	▲6.6%	Steady
12	Sevilla	Sevilla	5,108,807	▲10.5%	Steady
13	Bilbao	Bilbao	4,973,712	▲8.4%	Steady
14	Tenerife North	Tenerife	4,704,863	▲11.5%	Steady
15	Menorca	Menorca	3,434,615	▲8.1%	Steady
16	Santiago de Compostela	Santiago de Compostela	2,644,925	▲5.3%	Steady
17	Girona	Girona	1,946,816	▲16.9%	Steady
18	Asturias	Oviedo	1,407,217	▲9.8%	Steady
19	La Palma	La Palma	1,302,485	▲16.7%	Steady
20	Murcia–San Javier	Murcia	1,196,605	▲9.1%	Steady
21	A Coruña	A Coruña	1,141,242	▲7.3%	Steady
22	Vigo	Vigo	1,065,595	▲11.7%	Steady
23	Jerez de la Frontera	Jerez de la Frontera	1,046,251	▲14.1%	▲1
24	Reus	Reus	1,022,964	▲25.1%	▲1
25	Almería	Almería	1,007,446	▲9.5%	▼2
26	Seve Ballesteros–Santander	Santander	937,641	▲20.5%	Steady
27	Granada–Jaén	Granada	901,961	▲20.1%	Steady
28	Zaragoza	Zaragoza	438,035	▲4.4%	Steady
29	Melilla	Melilla	324,366	▼1.7%	Steady
30	San Sebastián	San Sebastián	281,859	▲6.6%	Steady
Total	For all ~50 reported airports		249,223,044	▲8.3%	

=== 2016 ===
The following is a list of the 30 busiest Spanish airports in 2016, from AENA statistics.

Rank	Airport	Location	Total passengers	Annual change	Rank change
1	Adolfo Suárez Madrid–Barajas	Madrid	50,418,909	▲7.7%	Steady
2	Barcelona–El Prat	Barcelona	44,154,722	▲11.2%	Steady
3	Palma de Mallorca	Palma de Mallorca	26,254,110	▲10.6%	Steady
4	Málaga–Costa Del Sol	Málaga	16,673,151	▲15.8%	Steady
5	Alicante–Elche	Alicante	12,344,945	▲16.7%	▲1
6	Gran Canaria	Gran Canaria	12,093,646	▲13.8%	▼1
7	Tenerife South	Tenerife	10,472,713	▲14.9%	Steady
8	Ibiza	Ibiza	7,416,161	▲14.5%	Steady
9	Lanzarote	Lanzarote	6,683,966	▲9.1%	Steady
10	Valencia	Valencia	5,799,104	▲14.7%	Steady
11	Fuerteventura	Fuerteventura	5,676,817	▲12.9%	Steady
12	Sevilla	Sevilla	4,624,038	▲7.3%	Steady
13	Bilbao	Bilbao	4,588,339	▲7.3%	Steady
14	Tenerife North	Tenerife	4,219,633	▲10.6%	Steady
15	Menorca	Menorca	3,178,612	▲10.8%	Steady
16	Santiago de Compostela	Santiago de Compostela	2,510,740	▲9.3%	Steady
17	Girona	Girona	1,664,763	▼6.2%	Steady
18	Asturias	Oviedo	1,281,979	▲14.5%	Steady
19	La Palma	La Palma	1,116,146	▲14.9%	▲2
20	Murcia–San Javier	Murcia	1,096,980	▲2.7%	▼1
21	A Coruña	A Coruña	1,063,291	▲3.7%	▼1
22	Vigo	Vigo	954,006	▲33.7%	▲2
23	Almería	Almería	919,808	▲33.1%	▲4
24	Jerez de la Frontera	Jerez de la Frontera	916,451	▲11.3%	▼1
25	Reus	Reus	817,611	▲16.0%	▲1
26	Seve Ballesteros–Santander	Santander	778,318	▼11.1%	▼4
27	Granada–Jaén	Granada	753,142	▲6.5%	▼2
28	Zaragoza	Zaragoza	419,529	▼1.0%	Steady
29	Melilla	Melilla	330,116	▲3.9%	Steady
30	San Sebastián	San Sebastián	264,422	▲3.7%	Steady
Total	For all ~50 reported airports		230,229,523		

=== 2015 ===
The following is a list of the 30 busiest Spanish airports in 2015, from final AENA statistics.

Rank	Airport	Location	Total passengers	Annual change	Rank change
1	Adolfo Suárez Madrid–Barajas	Madrid	46,824,838	▲11.9%	Steady
2	Barcelona–El Prat	Barcelona	39,711,237	▲5.7%	Steady
3	Palma de Mallorca	Palma de Mallorca	23,745,023	▲2.7%	Steady
4	Málaga–Costa Del Sol	Málaga	14,404,206	▲4.8%	Steady
5	Gran Canaria	Gran Canaria	10,627,218	▲3.0%	Steady
6	Alicante–Elche	Alicante	10,575,288	▲5.1%	Steady
7	Tenerife South	Tenerife	9,117,514	▼0.6%	Steady
8	Ibiza	Ibiza	6,477,283	▲4.3%	Steady
9	Lanzarote	Lanzarote	6,128,971	▲4.2%	Steady
10	Valencia	Valencia	5,055,127	▲10.0%	▲1
11	Fuerteventura	Fuerteventura	5,027,415	▲5.5%	▼1
12	Sevilla	Sevilla	4,308,845	▲10.9%	▲1
13	Bilbao	Bilbao	4,277,725	▲6.5%	▼1
14	Tenerife North	Tenerife	3,815,316	▲5.0%	Steady
15	Menorca	Menorca	2,867,521	▲8.9%	Steady
16	Santiago de Compostela	Santiago de Compostela	2,296,248	▲10.2%	▲1
17	Girona	Girona	1,775,318	▼17.8%	▼1
18	Asturias	Oviedo	1,119,273	▲5.1%	▲1
19	Murcia–San Javier	Murcia	1,067,576	▼2.5%	▼1
20	A Coruña	A Coruña	1,025,688	▲3.7%	Steady
21	La Palma	La Palma	971,676	▲12.6%	Steady
22	Seve Ballesteros–Santander	Santander	875,920	▲7.4%	▲1
23	Jerez de la Frontera	Jerez de la Frontera	823,177	▼8.6%	▲1
24	Vigo	Vigo	713,563	▲4.9%	▲2
25	Granada–Jaén	Granada	707,268	▲8.7%	▲2
26	Reus	Reus	705,067	▼17.1%	▼4
27	Almería	Almería	691,488	▼7.2%	▼2
28	Zaragoza	Zaragoza	423,873	▲1.3%	Steady
29	Melilla	Melilla	317,806	▼0.5%	Steady
30	San Sebastián	San Sebastián	255,071	▲3.9%	Steady
Total	For all ~50 reported airports		207,421,046		

=== 2014 ===
The following is a list of the 30 busiest Spanish airports in 2014, from AENA statistics.

Rank	Airport	Location	Total passengers	Annual change	Rank change
1	Adolfo Suárez Madrid–Barajas	Madrid	41,833,374	▲5.3%	Steady
2	Barcelona-El Prat	Barcelona	37,559,044	▲6.7%	Steady
3	Palma de Mallorca	Palma de Mallorca	23,115,499	▲1.5%	Steady
4	Málaga–Costa Del Sol	Málaga	13,749,134	▲6.4%	Steady
5	Gran Canaria	Gran Canaria	10,315,732	▲5.6%	Steady
6	Alicante–Elche	Alicante	10,065,873	▲4.4%	Steady
7	Tenerife South	Tenerife	9,176,274	▲5.5%	Steady
8	Ibiza	Ibiza	6,211,882	▲8.5%	Steady
9	Lanzarote	Lanzarote	5,883,039	▲10.3%	Steady
10	Fuerteventura	Fuerteventura	4,764,632	▲11.9%	▲1
11	Valencia	Valencia	4,592,512	▼0.6%	▼1
12	Bilbao	Bilbao	4,015,352	▲5.6%	Steady
13	Sevilla	Sevilla	3,884,146	▲5.3%	Steady
14	Tenerife North	Tenerife	3,638,953	▲3.2%	Steady
15	Menorca	Menorca	2,632,615	▲2.6%	▲1
16	Girona	Girona	2,160,646	▼21.1%	▼1
17	Santiago de Compostela	Santiago de Compostela	2,083,873	▲0.5%	Steady
18	Murcia–San Javier	Murcia	1,095,343	▼4.0%	Steady
19	Asturias	Oviedo	1,065,570	▲2.5%	Steady
20	A Coruña	A Coruña	988,834	▲17.7%	▲2
21	La Palma	La Palma	862,836	▲6.6%	▲3
22	Reus	Reus	850,648	▼12.4%	▼1
23	Santander	Santander	815,636	▼16.3%	▼3
24	Jerez de la Frontera	Jerez de la Frontera	758,004	▼6.6%	▼1
25	Almería	Almería	744,847	▲5.6%	Steady
26	Vigo	Vigo	680,387	▲0.2%	Steady
27	Granada–Jaén	Granada	650,544	▲1.9%	Steady
28	Zaragoza	Zaragoza	418,576	▼8.5%	Steady
29	Melilla	Melilla	319,603	▲10.4%	Steady
30	San Sebastián	San Sebastián	245,422	▲0.2%	▲1

=== 2013 ===
The following is a list of the 30 busiest Spanish airports in 2013, from AENA statistics.

Rank	Airport	Location	Total passengers	Annual change	Rank change
1	Madrid Barajas	Madrid	39,729,027	▼12.1%	Steady
2	Barcelona–El Prat	Barcelona	35,210,735	▲0.2%	Steady
3	Palma de Mallorca	Mallorca	22,768,082	▲0.4%	Steady
4	Málaga	Málaga	12,922,403	▲2.7%	Steady
5	Gran Canaria	Gran Canaria	9,770,253	▼1.2%	Steady
6	Alicante	Alicante	9,638,860	▲8.8%	Steady
7	Tenerife South	Tenerife	8,701,983	▲2.0%	Steady
8	Ibiza	Ibiza	5,726,581	▲3.1%	Steady
9	Lanzarote	Lanzarote	5,334,598	▲3.2%	Steady
10	Valencia	Valencia	4,599,990	▼3.2%	Steady
11	Fuerteventura	Fuerteventura	4,259,341	▼3.2%	Steady
12	Bilbao	Bilbao	3,800,789	▼8.9%	▲1
13	Seville	Seville	3,687,727	▼14.1%	▼1
14	Tenerife North	Tenerife	3,516,445	▼5.4%	Steady
15	Girona	Girona	2,736,867	▼3.8%	Steady
16	Menorca	Menorca	2,565,466	▲0.8%	Steady
17	Santiago de Compostela	Santiago de Compostela	2,073,055	▼5.5%	Steady
18	Murcia	Murcia	1,140,447	▼3.5%	▲1
19	Asturias	Oviedo	1,039,409	▼20.6%	▼1
20	Santander	Santander	974,043	▼12.8%	Steady
21	Reus	Reus	971,166	▲3.6%	▲1
22	A Coruña	A Coruña	839,837	▼0.7%	▲2
23	Jerez de la Frontera	Jerez de la Frontera	811,504	▼11.2%	Steady
24	La Palma	La Palma	809,521	▼16.2%	▼3
25	Almería	Almería	705,552	▼5.9%	▲1
26	Vigo	Vigo	678,720	▼18.1%	▼1
27	Granada–Jaén	Granada	636,289	▼12.4%	Steady
28	Zaragoza	Zaragoza	457,284	▼17.1%	Steady
29	Melilla	Melilla	289,551	▼8.3%	▲1
30	Valladolid	Valladolid	260,271	▼31.2%	▼1

=== 2012 ===
The following is a list of the 30 busiest Spanish airports in 2012, from AENA statistics.

Rank	Airport	Location	Total passengers	Annual change	Rank change
1	Madrid Barajas	Madrid	45,195,014	▼9.0%	Steady
2	Barcelona–El Prat	Barcelona	35,145,176	▲2.2%	Steady
3	Palma de Mallorca	Mallorca	22,666,682	▼0.3%	Steady
4	Málaga	Málaga	12,582,191	▼1.9%	Steady
5	Gran Canaria	Gran Canaria	9,892,288	▼6.1%	Steady
6	Alicante	Alicante	8,855,441	▼10.7%	Steady
7	Tenerife South	Tenerife	8,530,817	▼1.5%	Steady
8	Ibiza	Ibiza	5,555,071	▼1.6%	Steady
9	Lanzarote	Lanzarote	5,169,386	▼6.8%	Steady
10	Valencia	Valencia	4,752,020	▼4.6%	Steady
11	Fuerteventura	Fuerteventura	4,399,183	▼11.1%	▲1
12	Seville	Seville	4,287,488	▼13.5%	▼1
13	Bilbao	Bilbao	4,171,092	▲3.1%	▲1
14	Tenerife North	Tenerife	3,717,944	▼9.2%	▼1
15	Girona	Girona	2,844,682	▼5.4%	Steady
16	Menorca	Menorca	2,545,944	▼1.2%	Steady
17	Santiago de Compostela	Santiago de Compostela	2,194,611	▼10.9%	Steady
18	Asturias	Oviedo	1,309,640	▼2.2%	▲1
19	Murcia	Murcia	1,181,490	▼6.4%	▲1
20	Santander	Santander	1,117,617	▲0.1%	▲1
21	La Palma	La Palma	965,779	▼9.5%	▲1
22	Reus	Reus	937,446	▼31.2%	▼4
23	Jerez de la Frontera	Jerez de la Frontera	913,301	▼11.5%	Steady
24	A Coruña	A Coruña	845,452	▼16.5%	Steady
25	Vigo	Vigo	828,720	▼15.1%	Steady
26	Almería	Almería	749,712	▼4.0%	▲1
27	Granada–Jaén	Granada	728,428	▼16.5%	▼1
28	Zaragoza	Zaragoza	551,406	▼26.6%	Steady
29	Valladolid	Valladolid	378,419	▼18.2%	Steady
30	Melilla	Melilla	315,852	▲10.2%	Steady

=== 2011 ===
The following is a list of the 30 busiest Spanish airports in 2011, from AENA statistics.

Rank	Airport	Location	Total passengers	Annual change	Rank change
1	Madrid–Barajas	Madrid	49,671,270	▼0.4%	Steady
2	Barcelona–El Prat	Barcelona	34,398,226	▲17.8%	Steady
3	Palma de Mallorca	Mallorca	22,726,707	▲7.6%	Steady
4	Málaga	Málaga	12,823,117	▲6.3%	Steady
5	Gran Canaria	Gran Canaria	10,538,829	▲11.1%	Steady
6	Alicante	Alicante	9,913,731	▲5.7%	Steady
7	Tenerife South	Tenerife	8,656,487	▲17.6%	Steady
8	Ibiza	Ibiza	5,643,180	▲12.0%	▲3
9	Lanzarote	Lanzarote	5,543,744	▲12.3%	▲1
10	Valencia	Valencia	4,979,511	▲0.9%	▼1
11	San Pablo	Seville	4,959,359	▲17.4%	Steady
12	El Matorral	Fuerteventura	4,948,018	▲18.6%	▲1
13	Los Rodeos	Tenerife	4,095,103	▲1.1%	▼1
14	Bilbao	Bilbao	4,046,172	▲4.0%	Steady
15	Girona–Costa Brava	Girona	3,007,977	▼38.2%	▼3
16	Menorca	Menorca	2,576,200	▲2.6%	Steady
17	Santiago de Compostela	Santiago de Compostela	2,464,330	▲13.4%	Steady
18	Reus	Reus	1,362,683	▼4.0%	Steady
19	Asturias	Asturias	1,339,010	▼1.2%	▲1
20	Murcia–San Javier	Murcia	1,262,597	▼6.4%	Steady
21	Santander	Santander	1,116,398	▲21.4%	Steady
22	La Palma	La Palma	1,067,431	▲7.6%	Steady
23	Jerez	Jerez de la Frontera	1,032,493	▼1.0%	Steady
24	A Coruña	A Coruña	1,012,800	▼8.0%	Steady
25	Vigo–Peinador	Vigo	976,152	▼10.7%	Steady
26	Granada–Jaén	Granada	872,752	▼10.8%	Steady
27	Almería	Almería	780,853	▼0.8%	Steady
28	Zaragoza	Zaragoza	751,097	▲24.0%	Steady
29	Valladolid	Valladolid	462,504	▲17.8%	Steady
30	Melilla	Melilla	286,701	▼2.0%	Steady
