= List of Air Europa destinations =

Air Europa was founded by the International Leisure Group (ILG) as charter airline in June 1986. Based in Palma de Mallorca, private Spanish investors made up 75% of the stock, while the remaining 25% was held by ILG. Operations started on 21 November 1986, linking the Canary Islands with London using Boeing 737-300 equipment. In 1993, Air Europa became the first privately owned Spanish carrier in operating domestic scheduled services; international scheduled services started in 1995. By March 2000, the airline operated international scheduled services to Havana, London, Milan, New York City, Paris, Porto, Puerto Plata, Punta Cana and Santo Domingo; the list of domestic destinations comprised Alicante, Asturias, Badajoz, Barcelona, Bilbao, Granada, Ibiza, Jerez de la Frontera, La Coruna, Lanzarote, Las Palmas, Madrid, Málaga, Menorca, Palma de Mallorca, Salamanca, Santiago de Compostela, Seville, Tenerife, Valencia, Valladolid and Zaragoza.

== List ==
Air Europa serves the following destinations, as of December 2019:

Hub
Focus city
Seasonal
Future
Terminated route

City	Country	IATA	ICAO	Airport	Refs
A Coruña	Spain	LCG	LECO	A Coruña Airport	
Alghero	Italy	AHO	LIEA	Alghero–Fertilia Airport	
Alicante	Spain	ALC	LEAL	Alicante–Elche Miguel Hernández Airport	
Amsterdam	Netherlands	AMS	EHAM	Amsterdam Airport Schiphol	
Asturias	Spain	OVD	LEAS	Asturias Airport	
Asunción	Paraguay	ASU	SGAS	Silvio Pettirossi International Airport	
Athens	Greece	ATH	LGAV	Athens International Airport	
Badajoz	Spain	BJZ	LEBZ	Badajoz Airport	
Barcelona	Spain	BCN	LEBL	Josep Tarradellas Barcelona–El Prat Airport	
Banjul	Gambia	BJL	GBYD	Banjul International Airport	
Beijing	China	PEK	ZBAA	Beijing Capital International Airport	
Bilbao	Spain	BIO	LEBB	Bilbao Airport	
Bogotá	Colombia	BOG	SKBO	El Dorado International Airport	
Boston	United States	BOS	KBOS	Logan International Airport	
Brussels	Belgium	BRU	EBBR	Brussels Airport	
Buenos Aires	Argentina	EZE	SAEZ	Ministro Pistarini International Airport	
Cancún	Mexico	CUN	MMUN	Cancún International Airport	
Caracas	Venezuela	CCS	SVMI	Simon Bolivar International Airport	
Cardiff	United Kingdom	CWL	EGFF	Cardiff Airport	
Cartagena	Colombia	CTG	SKCG	Rafael Núñez International Airport	
Casablanca	Morocco	CMN	GMMN	Mohammed V International Airport	
Copenhagen	Denmark	CPH	EKCH	Copenhagen Airport	
Córdoba	Argentina	COR	SACO	Ingeniero Aeronáutico Ambrosio L.V. Taravella International Airport	
Dakar	Senegal	DKR	GOOY	Léopold Sédar Senghor International Airport	
Düsseldorf	Germany	DUS	EDDL	Düsseldorf Airport	
Fortaleza	Brazil	FOR	SBFZ	Pinto Martins – Fortaleza International Airport	
Frankfurt	Germany	FRA	EDDF	Frankfurt Airport	
Fuerteventura	Spain	FUE	GCFV	Fuerteventura Airport	
Granada	Spain	GRX	LEGR	Federico García Lorca Granada Airport	
Geneva	Switzerland	GVA	LSGG	Geneva Airport	
Guayaquil	Ecuador	GYE	SEGY	José Joaquín de Olmedo International Airport	
Havana	Cuba	HAV	MUHA	José Martí International Airport	
Ibiza	Spain	IBZ	LEIB	Ibiza Airport	
Istanbul	Turkey	IST	LTFM	Istanbul Airport	
Johannesburg; Begins 24 June 2026	South Africa	JNB	FAOR	O. R. Tambo International Airport	
Lanzarote	Spain	ACE	GCRR	Lanzarote Airport	
La Romana	Dominican Republic	LRM	MDLR	La Romana International Airport	
Las Palmas	Spain	LPA	GCLP	Gran Canaria Airport	
Las Vegas	United States	LAS	KLAS	McCarran International Airport	
Lima	Peru	LIM	SPIM	Jorge Chávez International Airport	
Lisbon	Portugal	LIS	LPPT	Lisbon Airport	
London	United Kingdom	LGW	EGKK	Gatwick Airport	
Madrid	Spain	MAD	LEMD	Adolfo Suárez Madrid–Barajas Airport	
Mahé	Seychelles	SEZ	FSIA	Seychelles International Airport	
Malabo	Equatorial Guinea	SSG	FGSL	Malabo International Airport	
Málaga	Spain	AGP	LEMG	Málaga Airport	
Marrakesh	Morocco	RAK	GMMX	Marrakesh Menara Airport	
Medellín	Colombia	MDE	SKRG	José María Córdova International Airport	
Mexico City	Mexico	MEX	MMMX	Mexico City International Airport	
Miami	United States	MIA	KMIA	Miami International Airport	
Milan	Italy	MXP	LIMC	Milan Malpensa Airport	
Menorca	Spain	MAH	LEMH	Menorca Airport	
Montevideo	Uruguay	MVD	SUMU	Carrasco International Airport	
Munich	Germany	MUC	EDDM	Munich Airport	
Nador	Morocco	NDR	GMMW	Nador International Airport	
New York City	United States	JFK	KJFK	John F. Kennedy International Airport	
Norwich	United Kingdom	NWI	EGSH	Norwich International Airport	
Ouarzazate	Morocco	OZZ	GMMZ	Ouarzazate Airport	
Oujda	Morocco	OUD	GMFO	Angads Airport	
Palma de Mallorca	Spain	PMI	LEPA	Palma de Mallorca Airport	
Panama City	Panama	PTY	MPTO	Tocumen International Airport	
Paris	France	CDG	LFPG	Charles de Gaulle Airport	
Paris	France	ORY	LFPO	Orly Airport	
Porto	Portugal	OPO	LPPR	Porto Airport	
Puerto Iguazu	Argentina	IGR	SARI	Cataratas del Iguazú International Airport	
Puerto Plata	Dominican Republic	POP	MDPP	Gregorio Luperón International Airport	
Punta Cana	Dominican Republic	PUJ	MDPC	Punta Cana International Airport	
Quito	Ecuador	UIO	SEQU	Mariscal Sucre International Airport	
Recife	Brazil	REC	SBRF	Recife/Guararapes–Gilberto Freyre International Airport	
Rio de Janeiro	Brazil	GIG	SBGL	Rio de Janeiro/Galeão International Airport	
Rome	Italy	FCO	LIRF	Leonardo da Vinci–Fiumicino Airport	
Salamanca	Spain	SLM	LESA	Salamanca Airport	
Salvador da Bahia	Brazil	SSA	SBSV	Salvador Bahia Airport	
Santa Cruz de la Sierra	Bolivia	VVI	SLVR	Viru Viru International Airport	
Santiago	Chile	SCL	SCEL	Arturo Merino Benítez International Airport	
Santiago de Compostela	Spain	SCQ	LEST	Santiago de Compostela Airport	
Santo Domingo	Dominican Republic	SDQ	MDSD	Las Américas International Airport	
San Juan	Puerto Rico	SJU	TJSJ	Luis Muñoz Marín International Airport	
San Pedro Sula	Honduras	SAP	MHLM	Ramón Villeda Morales International Airport	
São Paulo	Brazil	GRU	SBGR	São Paulo/Guarulhos International Airport	
Seville	Spain	SVQ	LEZL	Seville Airport	
Shanghai	China	PVG	ZSPD	Shanghai Pudong International Airport	
Stockholm	Sweden	ARN	ESSA	Stockholm Arlanda Airport	
Tel Aviv	Israel	TLV	LLBG	Ben Gurion Airport	
Tenerife	Spain	TFN	GCXO	Tenerife North Airport	
Tenerife	Spain	TFS	GCTS	Tenerife South Airport	
Tunis	Tunisia	TUN	DTTA	Tunis–Carthage International Airport	
Ufa	Russia	UFA	UWUU	Ufa International Airport	
Valencia	Spain	VLC	LEVC	Valencia Airport	
Valladolid	Spain	VLL	LEVD	Valladolid Airport	
Varadero	Cuba	VRA	MUVR	Juan Gualberto Gómez Airport	
Venice	Italy	VCE	LIPZ	Venice Marco Polo Airport	
Vigo	Spain	VGO	LEVX	Vigo–Peinador Airport	
Zaragoza	Spain	ZAZ	LEZG	Zaragoza Airport	
Zurich	Switzerland	ZRH	LSZH	Zürich Airport	
