= Karlstad Airport =

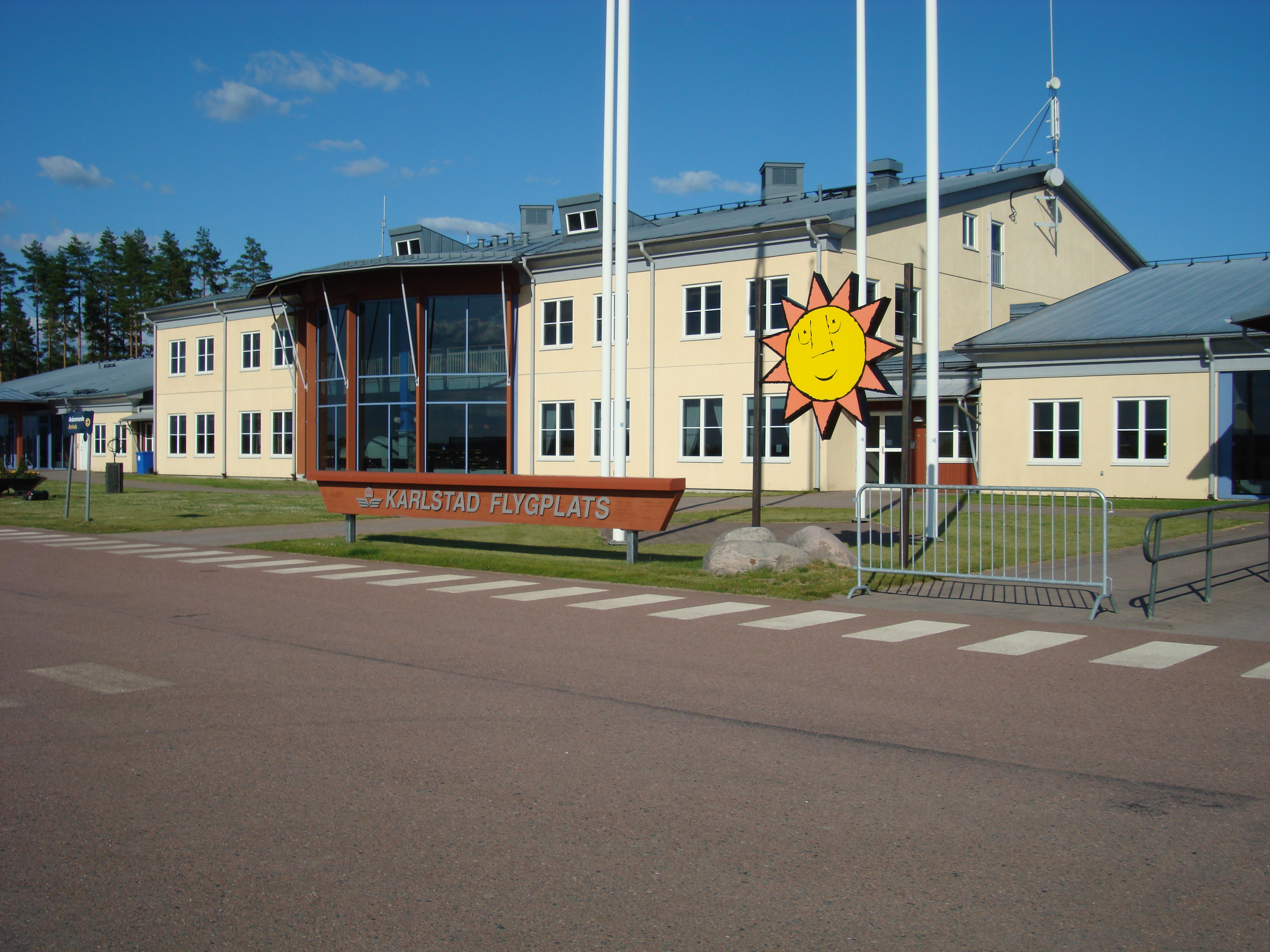
- IATA: KSD; ICAO: ESOK

Summary
- Airport type: Public
- Operator: Karlstad Airport AB
- Location: Karlstad Municipality
- Elevation AMSL: 352 ft (107 m)
- Coordinates: 59°26′41″N 013°20′15″E

Map
- Location within Värmland County

Runways
Direction	Length		Surface
Direction	ft	m	Surface
03/21	8,255	2,516	Asphalt
03L/21R	1,840	561	Grass

Statistics (2017)
- Passengers total: 89,936
- International passengers: 44,071
- Domestic passengers: 45,865
- Statistics: Transportstyrelsen

Karlstad Airport (IATA: KSD, ICAO: ESOK) is situated 16 km (10 mi) from Karlstad city centre in Sweden.

== History ==
The airport was opened for traffic in 1997. The airport was built since the older Karlstad-Jakobsberg airport (59°21′36″N 13°27′58.4″E) was causing noise to many residents due to its location 3 km from Karlstad city centre, and also because a longer runway was desired. The old airport had too short runway for charter flights to southern Europe, but such flights became common from the opening of the new airport. The route to Stockholm had still a large majority of the passengers the first years, but this route declined due to other available transport modes such as car and train on this fairly short route (258 km (160 mi)), and was finally closed in 2020 after reduced demand as a result of the COVID-19 pandemic.

== Airlines and destinations ==
The following airlines operate regular scheduled and charter flights at Karlstad Airport:

Airlines	Destinations
Sola Air	Copenhagen,
Sunclass Airlines	Seasonal charter: Gran Canaria, Palma de Mallorca, Rhodes
TUI fly Nordic	Seasonal charter: Gran Canaria (begins 9 November 2026)

== Statistics ==
From Transportstyrelsen and Karlstad flygplats:

Year	Passengers	Domestic	International
1998	245,310	170,283	86,574
1999	271,411 ▲		
2000	291,503 ▲	175,522	115,981
2001	262,105 ▼		
2002	216,072 ▼		
2003	171,680 ▼		
2004	160,335 ▼	102,941	57,394
2005	144,365 ▼		
2006	113,087 ▼		
2007	119,482 ▲		
2008	118,762 ▼	59,169	59,593
2009	84,880 ▼		
2010	82,423 ▼		
2011	108,893 ▲		
2012	100,349 ▼	38,418	61,912
2013	109,574 ▲		
2014	83,288 ▼		
2015	93,517 ▲		
2016	85,848 ▼	45,757	40,091
2017	89,936 ▲		
2018	81,884 ▼		
2019	52,009 ▼	16,926	35,083
2020	10,900 ▼	3,097	7,803
2021	3,830 ▼	548	3,282
2022	19,840 ▲	2,123	17,717
2023	20,463 ▲	600	19,863
