= Santander Airport =

Santander Airport Aeropuerto Seve Ballesteros - Santander

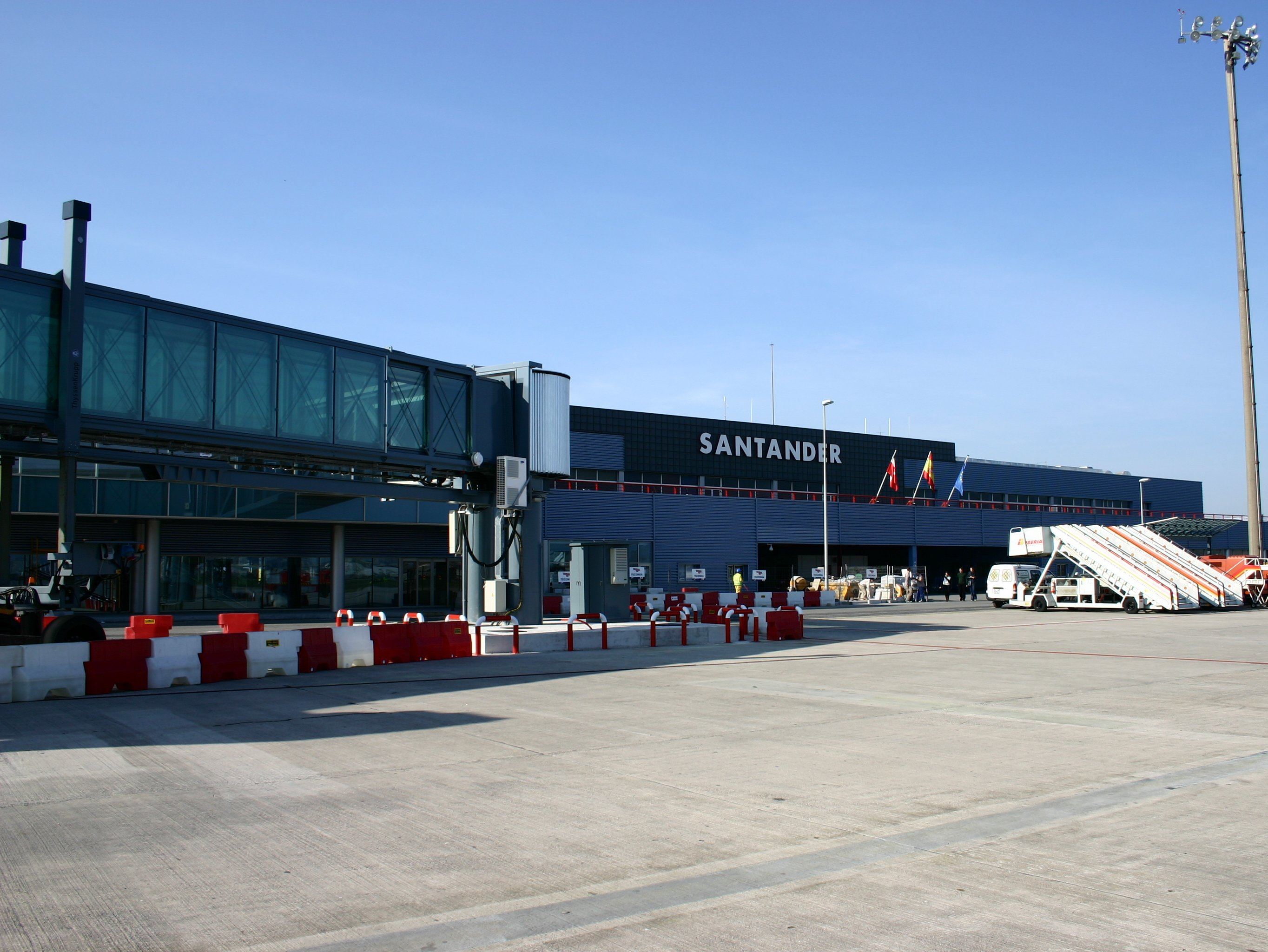
- IATA: SDR; ICAO: LEXJ

Summary
- Airport type: Public
- Owner/Operator: AENA
- Location: Maliaño, Camargo, Cantabria, Spain
- Elevation AMSL: 16 ft (4.9 m)
- Coordinates: 43°25′37″N 03°49′12″W
- Website: aena-aeropuertos.es

Map
- Location within Spain

Runways
Direction	Length		Surface
Direction	ft	m	Surface
11/29	7,939	2,420	Asphalt

Statistics (2019)
- Passengers: 1,174,896
- Passenger change 18-19: ▲6.5%
- Movements: 11,236
- Movements change 18-19: ▼0.2%
- Sources: Passenger Traffic, AENA; Spanish AIP, AENA

Santander Airport (IATA: SDR, ICAO: LEXJ), officially Seve Ballesteros–Santander Airport, is an international airport near Santander, Spain and the only airport in Cantabria. In 2018 the airport handled 1,103,353 passengers and 11,258 flights, far more than in 1995 when it handled only 180,000 passengers. Since then, the traffic has declined following the trend in Spanish airports and the decrease in operations by some of the companies.

== Runway ==
The airport has a single runway, runway 11/29, with a length of 2,420 m / 7,612 ft. Runway 29 ends about 20 meters next to the Bay of Santander and runway 11 ends about 150 meters from the highway S-10 and a shopping center. Since 2021, there is a precision approach lighting system at runway 29.

== Name ==
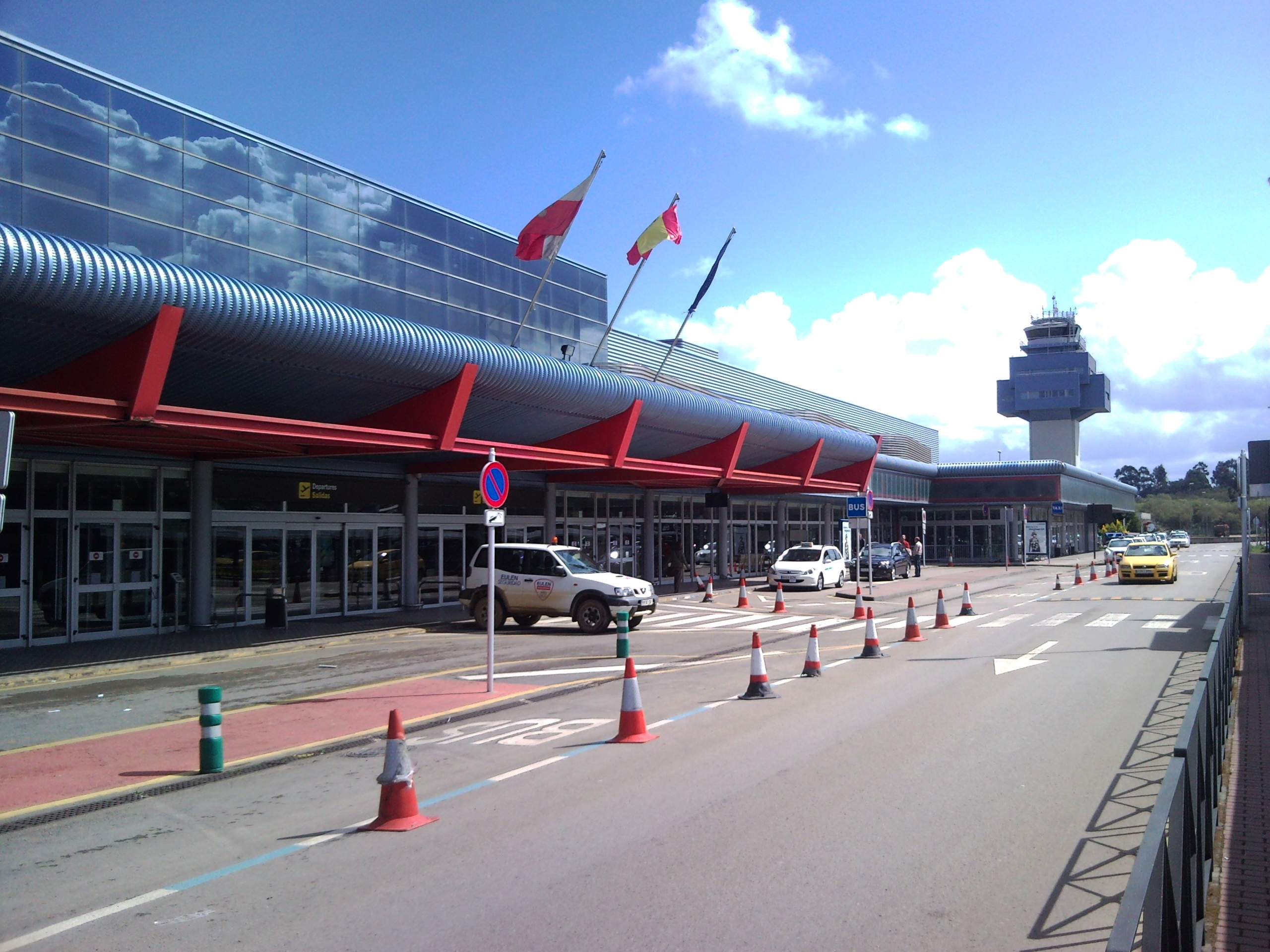
Entrance to the passenger terminal

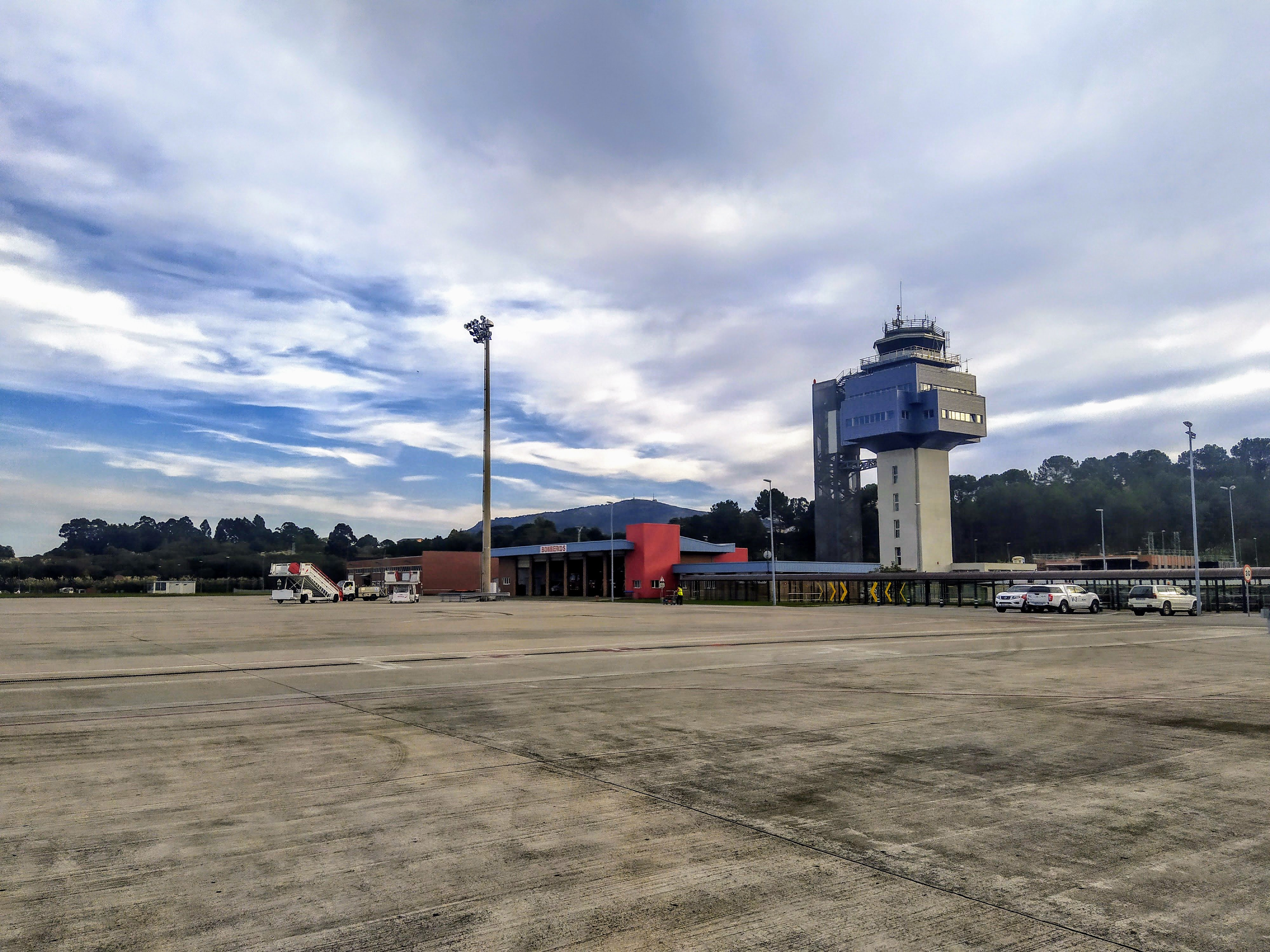
Airport control tower and fire station.

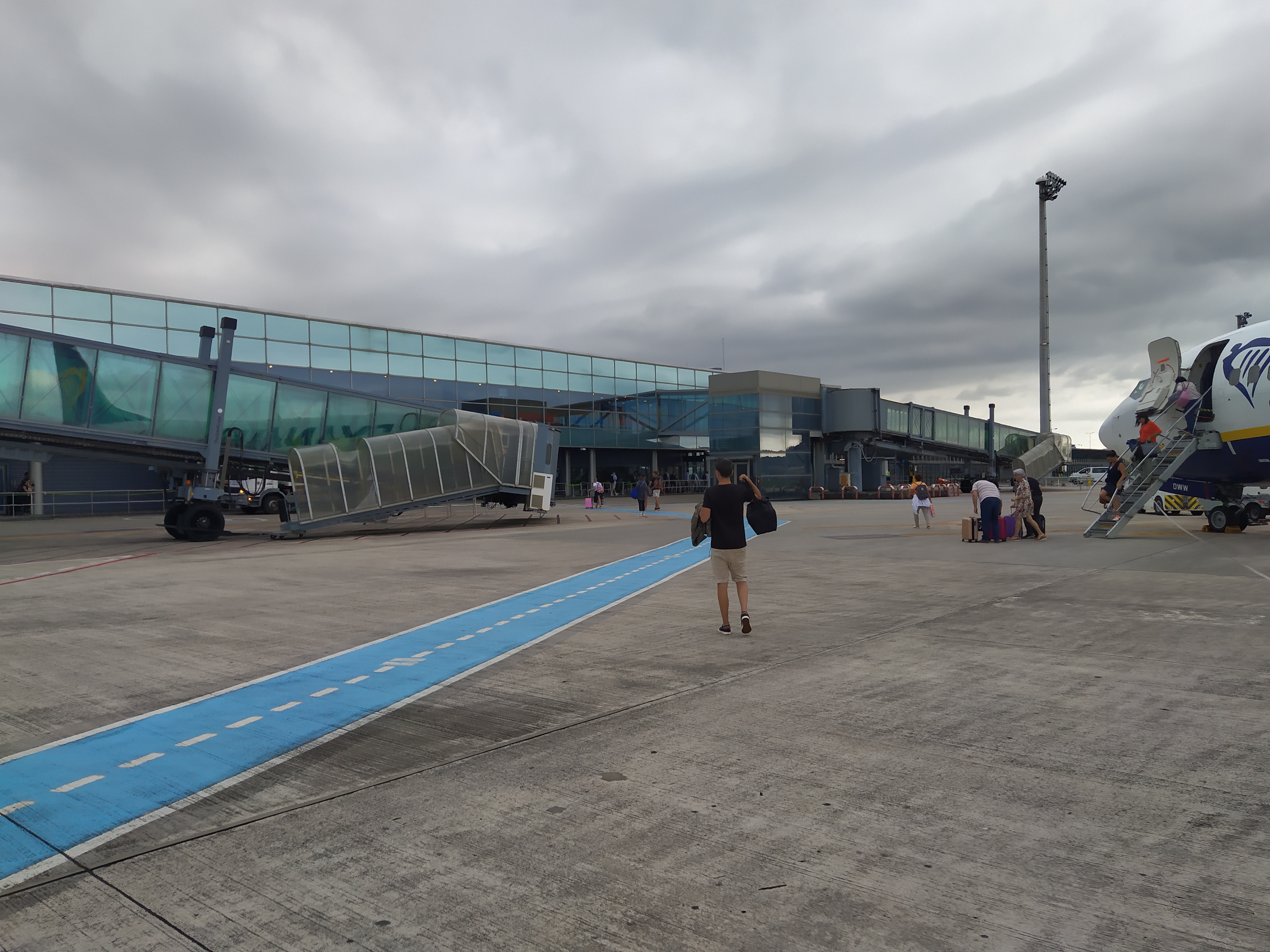
Airport parking apron.

The airport is named after the famous golf player Seve Ballesteros, born in Pedreña, a few kilometres from the airport and being one of the most well known public figures of Cantabria in the last century. The airport was known as 'Santander Airport' until 2015. In May 2014, a popular initiative taken to the Parliament of Cantabria was unanimously approved to change the name after Ballesteros. The Spanish government approved the change on 16 April 2015.

== History ==
=== Foundation and early years ===
The current airport, built on ground reclaimed from the Bay of Santander, was opened to traffic in 1977. A smaller airfield was built on the location between 1947 and 1952 by prisoners of the Spanish Civil War. It opened in 1953, replacing the old Santander airport located in La Albericia, which received commercial flights since 1949, and received the name of Aeropuerto de Santander and popularly known as "Parayas". It received the international rating in 1957.

After a three-year closure (from April 1974 until 8 August 1977), in which the airport underwent a major renovation that significantly expanded its facilities and had a cost of more than 1,100 million pesetas of the time; it was reopened with a new 2,400 m runway and with the technology to allow both visual and instrumental flight; the first flight after the renovation corresponded to the Iberia's DC-9 "Ciudad de Santander", that covered the Barcelona-Santander-Santiago de Compostela route.

=== Development since 2000 ===
Until 2003, the premises were considered underused due to the limited number of flights and their high fees, which made a shift in potential passengers to the airport of Bilbao, 100 km away. From this date, following an agreement signed between the Government of Cantabria and the budget airline Ryanair, the airport experimented an increase in the number of destinations (national and international), passengers and airlines operating. In 2005, the airport reached 644,662 passengers, growing by 88% over the previous year and having a user balance between domestic and international flights. This increase was the largest proportion of all airports in Spain in that year.

From 2007, there have been new renovation works, that started in 2007, remodeling and expanding the terminal and installing two gateways or fingers for direct access to the planes, widening the platform for parking more aircraft or construction of taxiways and a platform for general aviation.

In December 2010, 37.8 million euro was invested for the upgrading of the facilities, preparing the airport to handle an annual traffic of over two million passengers a year. The works included the remodeling of the terminal building of 10,200 square meters, expanding new areas of departures and arrivals as well as the construction of a taxiway that can handle 22 movements per hour, and the extension of the aircraft parking platform.

== Facilities ==
After the implementation of the renovations referred to in the airport master plan, today it has 8 check-in desks, 3 baggage carousels in the arrivals lounge and 7 boarding gates. As an international airport, it is also capable of handling flights from countries outside the Schengen zone.

== Airlines and destinations ==
The following airlines operate regular scheduled and charter flights at Santander Airport:

Airlines	Destinations
Binter Canarias	Gran Canaria, Tenerife–North; Seasonal: Lanzarote
Iberia	Madrid; Seasonal: Almería, Jerez de la Frontera, Vigo
Ryanair	Brussels Charleroi, Dublin, Edinburgh, London–Stansted, Marrakech; Seasonal: Birmingham, Bologna, Manchester, Venice Treviso
Volotea	Granada, Madrid, Málaga, Seville, Valencia; Seasonal: Menorca
Vueling	Barcelona, Paris Orly; Seasonal: Alicante, Ibiza, Palma de Mallorca
Wizz Air	Bucharest–Otopeni, Milan–Malpensa, Valencia; Seasonal: Sofia, Tirana

== Statistics ==
Traffic per year

2000	2001	2002	2003	2004	2005	2006	2007	2008	2009	2010
260,767 (+16.1%) 29th	272,383 (+4.5%) 28th	262,070 (-3.8%) 29th	253,756 (-3.2%) 29th	342,559 (+35.0%) 28th	644,662 (+88.1%) 27th	649,447 (+0.7%) 27th	761,780 (+17.3%) 27th	856,606 (+12.4%) 27th	958,157 (+11.9%) 26th	918,470 (-4.1%) 26th
2011	2012	2013	2014	2015	2016	2017	2018	2019		
1,116,398 (+21.4%) 21st	1,117,617 (+0.1%) 20th	974,043 (-12.8%) 20th	815,636 (-16.3%) 23rd	875,920 (+7.4%) 22nd	778.318 (-11,1%) 26th	937.641 (+20,5%) 26th	1,103,353 (+17.7%) 25th	1,174,896 (+6.5%) 22nd		

=== Busiest routes ===
Busiest international routes from SDR (2023)
Rank	Destination	Passengers	Change 2023/24
1	London-Stansted	76,399	▼8%
2	Charleroi	59,758	▼11%
3	Rome-Fiumicino	58,528	▼13%
4	Dublin	46,791	▼4%
5	Edinburgh	41,269	▲3%
6	Marrakech	35,197	▲2%
7	Bergamo	33,668	▲1%
8	Vienna	31,524	▼8%
9	Beauvais	27,641	▼2%
10	Birmingham Bucharest-Otopeni	27,516	▼5%
11	Manchester	26,746	▼17%
12	Treviso	25,740	▲6%
13	Bucharest-Otopeni	23,738	▼33%
14	Bologna	18,720	▲5%
Source: Estadísticas de tráfico aereo

Busiest domestic routes from SDR (2023)
Rank	Destination	Passengers	Change 2022/23
1	Madrid	220,289	▲15%
2	Barcelona	203,799	▲7%
3	Seville	61,524	▲94%
4	Málaga	53,604	▲30%
5	Valencia	51,685	▼17%
6	Palma de Mallorca	28,125	▼41%
7	Gran Canaria	22,659	▲15%
8	Alicante	19,200	▲154%
9	Tenerife-North	17,783	▲9%
10	Murcia	9,701	▲17%
11	Ibiza	4,835	▲1%
12	Menorca	4,797	▲1%
13	Jerez de la Frontera	1,590	▼17%
14	Granada	1,510	▼4%
15	Vigo	1,268	▼12%
Source: Estadísticas de tráfico aereo

== Ground transport ==
The road access by car is from the S-10 highway, exit 3 and then taking the road N-636 that leads to the airport facilities. There is also a regular bus line from Santander's main bus station in the city centre. The line buses from ALSA also stop in the airport prior booking in the routes that connect Santander with other towns in northern Spain like Bilbao, Gijón, Oviedo or Laredo.
