= El Hierro Airport =

El Hierro Airport Aeropuerto de El Hierro

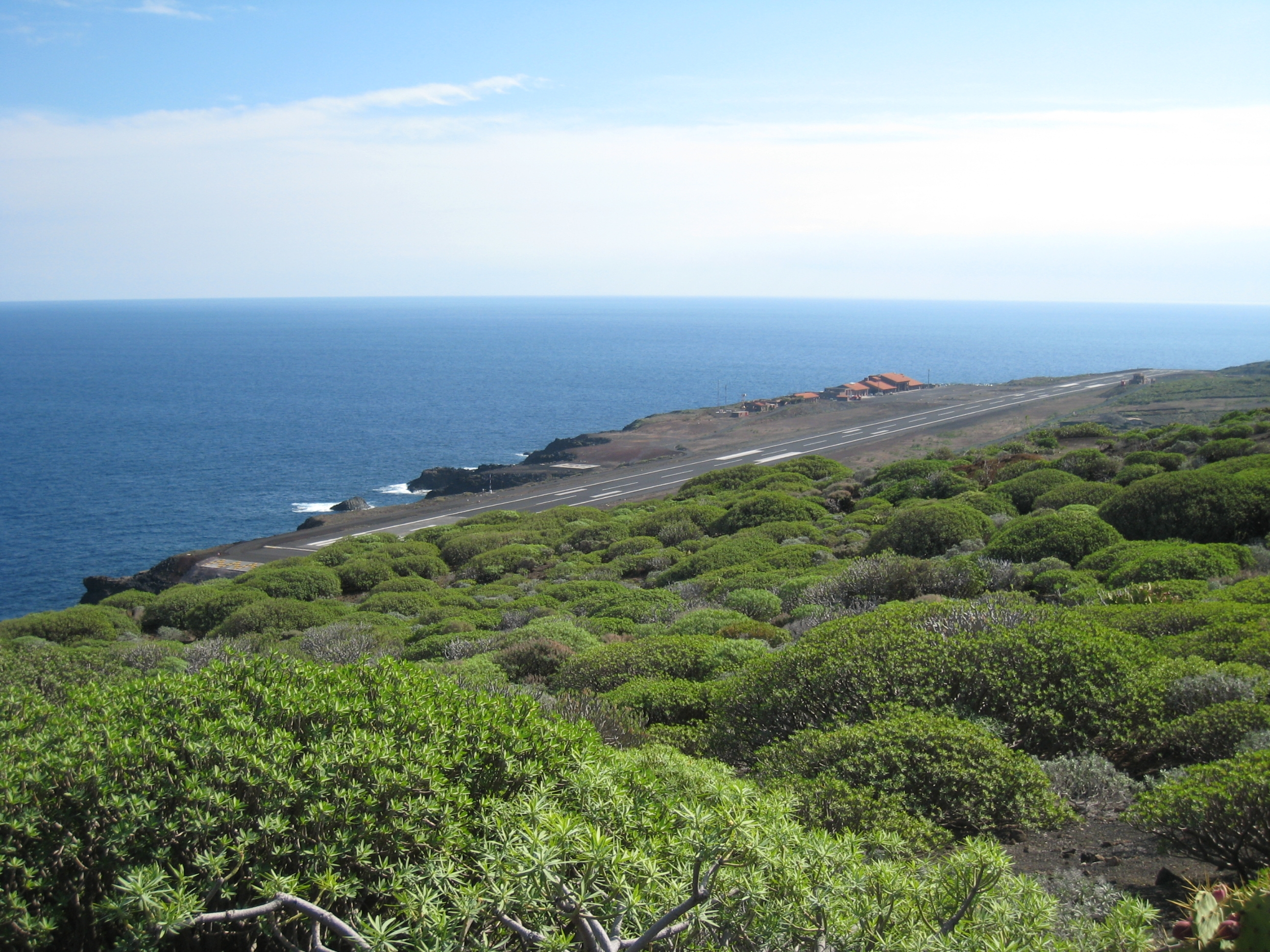
- IATA: VDE; ICAO: GCHI

Summary
- Airport type: Public
- Owner/Operator: AENA
- Location: El Hierro
- Elevation AMSL: 32 m / 103 ft
- Coordinates: 27°48′53″N 017°53′13″W
- Website: Airport of El Hierro

Map
- Location within Spain

Runways
Direction	Length		Surface
Direction	m	ft	Surface
16/34	1,250	4,101	Asphalt

Statistics (2019)
- Passengers: 268,900
- Passenger change 18-19: ▲8.8%
- Source:Spanish AIP at EUROCONTROL, Aena

El Hierro Airport (Spanish: Aeropuerto de El Hierro, also known as Aeropuerto de Los Cangrejos) (IATA: VDE, ICAO: GCHI) is an airport located 9 km (5.6 mi) northeast of Valverde. It is the only existing airport on the Island of El Hierro, Canary Islands, Spain. It was inaugurated in December 1972.

The air traffic is domestic, and the flights are normally from/to Tenerife North and Gran Canaria. In 2011, the airport carried 170,225 passengers, with 4,674 operations and 135 tons of cargo.

== History ==
The first aeronautical event in the island was on December 12, 1955, and it was the first rescue operation by the SAR in the Canary Islands too. It consisted of the evacuation of an ill person who had to be transported to Tenerife in a helicopter.

There was a real need for an airport on the island, so in 1962, some studies to locate the best place for the future airport were started, but the orography of the island is very complex, and there were not too many suitable places available.

Finally, the engineers decided to place the airport in a place called "Llano de los Cangrejos" located in the northeast of the Island, near its capital, Valverde.

Works to build the new installations began in 1967, building a runway (16-34), a small passenger terminal, and an apron. Once the works were finished, on November 11, 1972, the airport was inaugurated and dedicated to national air traffic of passengers and cargo. It was classified as a 2-C category (ICAO) or airport of third category.

The first airplane to land was a Do-27 of the Spanish Air Force, but the official inauguration was made by a DC-3 which carried the minister Julio Salvador y Días-Benjumena.

The first regular connection was inaugurated by Iberia, starting operations on December 19, 1972, with a Fokker F-27 commanded by Vicente Ramos Hernández, which made the route from Tenerife North - El Hierro - Tenerife North.

During 1989 and 1990, a new control tower was built on the west side of the runway, the old one was demolished, and at the same time a new passenger terminal was built. In July, 1992, instead of Iberia, BinterCanarias started to operate the route from Tenerife North to El Hierro with an ATR-72. For that reason, the runway had to be extended to 1205 metres (3953 ft) length. This extension allowed an increase in the number of passengers and operations. It has a short 1250 m (4100 ft) runway, which limits the airport to handling regional turboprop aircraft, however if required it can handle a 737 or A320-family jet.

== Infrastructure ==
The control tower is located in the western part of the island, opposite to the terminal - where an air traffic controller and the maintenance technicians work. In 2008, works to renovate the control tower began, with the aim of modernizing the installations. At present, it has the SACTA 3.5 system, which allows radar visualization of the radar data.

== Airlines and destinations ==
The following airlines operate regular scheduled and charter flights at El Hierro Airport:

Airlines	Destinations
Binter Canarias	Gran Canaria, Tenerife–North
CanaryFly	Tenerife–North
