= Pamplona Airport =

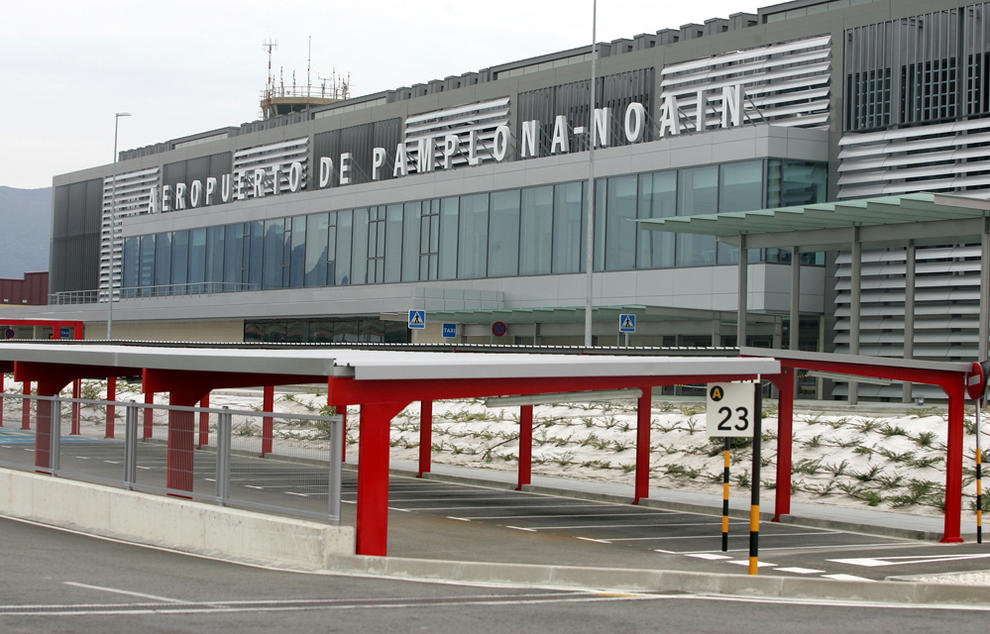
- IATA: PNA; ICAO: LEPP

Summary
- Airport type: Public
- Owner/Operator: AENA
- Serves: Pamplona, Navarra, Spain
- Elevation AMSL: 1,504 ft (458 m)
- Coordinates: 42°46′12″N 01°38′49.2″W
- Website: aena.es

Map
- Location within Spain

Runways
Direction	Length		Surface
Direction	ft	m	Surface
16/34	7,241	2,207	Asphalt

Statistics (2024)
- Passengers: 220,423
- Passengers change 23-24: ▲11.6%
- Movements: 5,355
- Movements change 22-23: ▼8.8%
- Cargo (t): 0.3
- Sources: Aena

Pamplona Airport is an airport in Pamplona, Navarra, Spain (IATA: PNA, ICAO: LEPP). It is 3.7 miles (6.0 km) from the city of Pamplona, Navarra's capital. It is between Noáin and Esquiroz. It is a public airport managed by Aena.

== History ==
The construction of Pamplona Airport was approved in 1968. The following year, a 500 metres (1,600 ft) runway was inaugurated, with a light aircraft from the Real Aeroclub de Navarra (Royal Aero Club of Navarre) being the first to use it on 3 October 1969. The official opening was the following day, 4 October 1969. Shortly afterward, the runway was doubled in length to 1,000 metres (3,300 ft) and 45 metres (148 ft) wide. Two years later, it was extended again, this time to 1,750 metres (5,740 ft).

On 6 July 1972, the airport was opened to regular passenger traffic, with the inauguration taking place with an Fokker F27-100 from Aviaco that covered the route between Madrid and Pamplona. The airport's first passenger terminal opened on 6 July 1973. During the 1970s, the track was widened again to 2,200 metres (7,200 ft).

The new terminal and control tower of the airport were opened on 24 November 2010. The old terminal and old control tower sit right next to the new terminal and have various uses at the moment.

Between 2017 and beginning of 2020 Lufthansa flew between Pamplona and Frankfurt daily, but the service was discontinued in March 2020 due to the COVID-19 outbreak.

== Airlines and destinations ==
The following airlines operate regular scheduled and charter flights at Pamplona Airport:

Airlines	Destinations
Binter Canarias	Gran Canaria, Tenerife–North
Iberia	Barcelona, Madrid; Seasonal: Ibiza
Volotea	Seville (begins 6 November 2026)

== Public transport ==
=== Bus ===
Since 6 November 2017, Line A of Pamplona City Transport connects the airport with the city center and the Renfe train station every hour. Due to low ridership the bus service was cancelled a year and a half later.

=== Car ===
In addition to regular taxis, since August 2019 a taxi service is offered between Paseo Sarasate and the airport. It drives several times per day in both directions, and passengers need to make a reservation in advance.

== Busiest routes ==
Busiest routes from PNA (2025)
Rank	Destination	Passengers	Change 2024/25
1	Madrid	170,828	▼0.5%
2	Gran Canaria	33,312	▼6.3%
3	Tenerife-North	17,374	new route
4	Istanbul	1,059	▲57.1%
5	Barcelona	751	▲32.0%
6	Seville	731	▼63.7%
7	Valencia	667	▼0.1%
8	Tinduf	584	▲40.7%|-
Source: Estadísticas de tráfico aereo

== Statistics ==
Pamplona Airport Passenger Totals 2000-2025
Updated: 15 January 2025
