= Badajoz Airport =

Airport in Spain

Badajoz Airport Aeropuerto de Badajoz

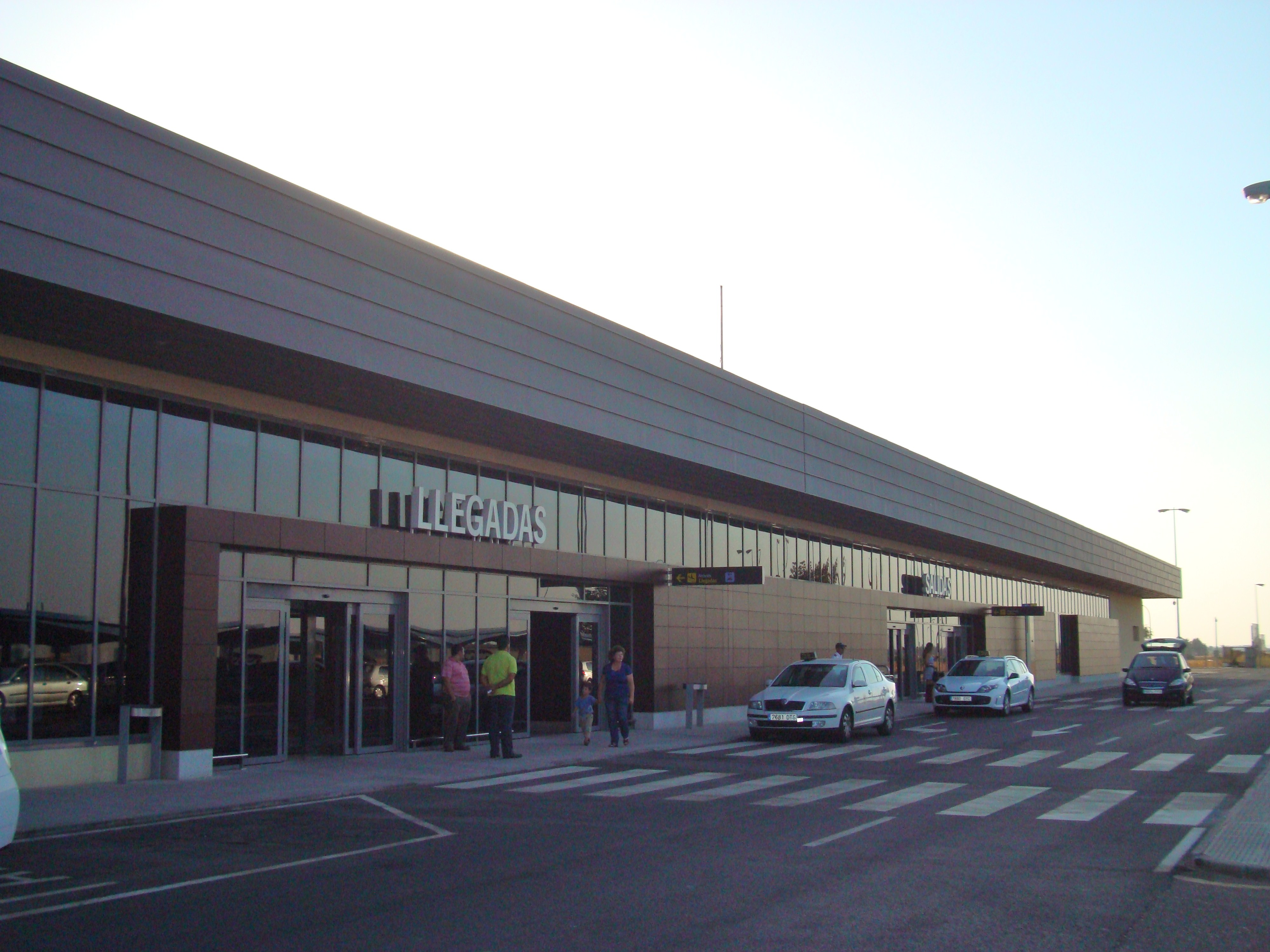
- IATA: BJZ; ICAO: LEBZ

Summary
- Airport type: Military/Public
- Owner/Operator: AENA
- Serves: Badajoz and Mérida
- Location: Badajoz
- Elevation AMSL: 185 m (607 ft)
- Coordinates: 38°53′29″N 06°49′17″W

Map
- Location of airport in Spain

Runways
Direction	Length		Surface
Direction	m	ft	Surface
13/31	2,852	9,357	Asphalt

Statistics (2019)
- Passengers: 75,416
- Passenger change 18-19: ▲44.8%
- Source: Aena

Badajoz Airport (Spanish: Aeropuerto de Badajoz) (IATA: BJZ, ICAO: LEBZ) is an airport located 13 km (8.1 mi) east of Badajoz, a city in Extremadura, Spain, and 45 km (28 mi) west of Mérida, Spain, the capital of the same Autonomous Community. The airport is connected with both cities by the Autovía A-5 motorway. The airport shares its runway and control tower with the Talavera la Real Air Base (Spanish: Base Aérea de Talavera la Real), an air base of the Spanish Air and Space Force, named for the nearby municipality of Talavera la Real. It is currently the only airport in Extremadura.

== Airlines and destinations ==
The following airlines operate regular scheduled and charter flights at Badajoz Airport:

Airlines	Destinations
Binter Canarias	Gran Canaria, Tenerife–North
Iberia	Barcelona, Madrid; Seasonal: Gran Canaria, Palma de Mallorca

If passengers do fly internationally from this airport, they would need to transit in either Madrid or Barcelona to get to other international destinations.

== Statistics ==
=== Annual traffic ===
Traffic by calendar year
	Passengers	Movements	Cargo (kilos)
2004	82,596	8,230	0
2005	72,966	4,451	0
2006	80,464	4,434	0
2007	91,585	4,181	80
2008	81,010	4,033	0
2009	75,351	3,783	0
2010	61,179	3,411	0
2011	56,981	2,957	0
2012	65,642	2,283	0
2013	29,112	1,414	0
2014	39,600	1,838	0
2015	22,370	1,525	0
2016	32,963	1,563	0
2017	49,304	1,865	0
2018	52,068	1,985	0
2019	75,416	2,880	0
2020	29,999	1,644	0
2021	42,175	1,887	0
2022	65,806	2,715	0
2023	80,254	3,125	0
Source: Aena Statistics

=== Busiest routes ===
Busiest domestic routes from BJZ (2023)
Rank	Destination	Passengers	Change 2022 / 23
1	Madrid	35,553	▲60%
2	Barcelona	34,747	▲1%
3	Palma de Mallorca	4,419	▲11%
4	Gran Canaria	1,621	New Route
5	Alicante	1,597	▲5%
Source: Estadísticas de tráfico aereo
