= Canaryfly =

Spanish airline

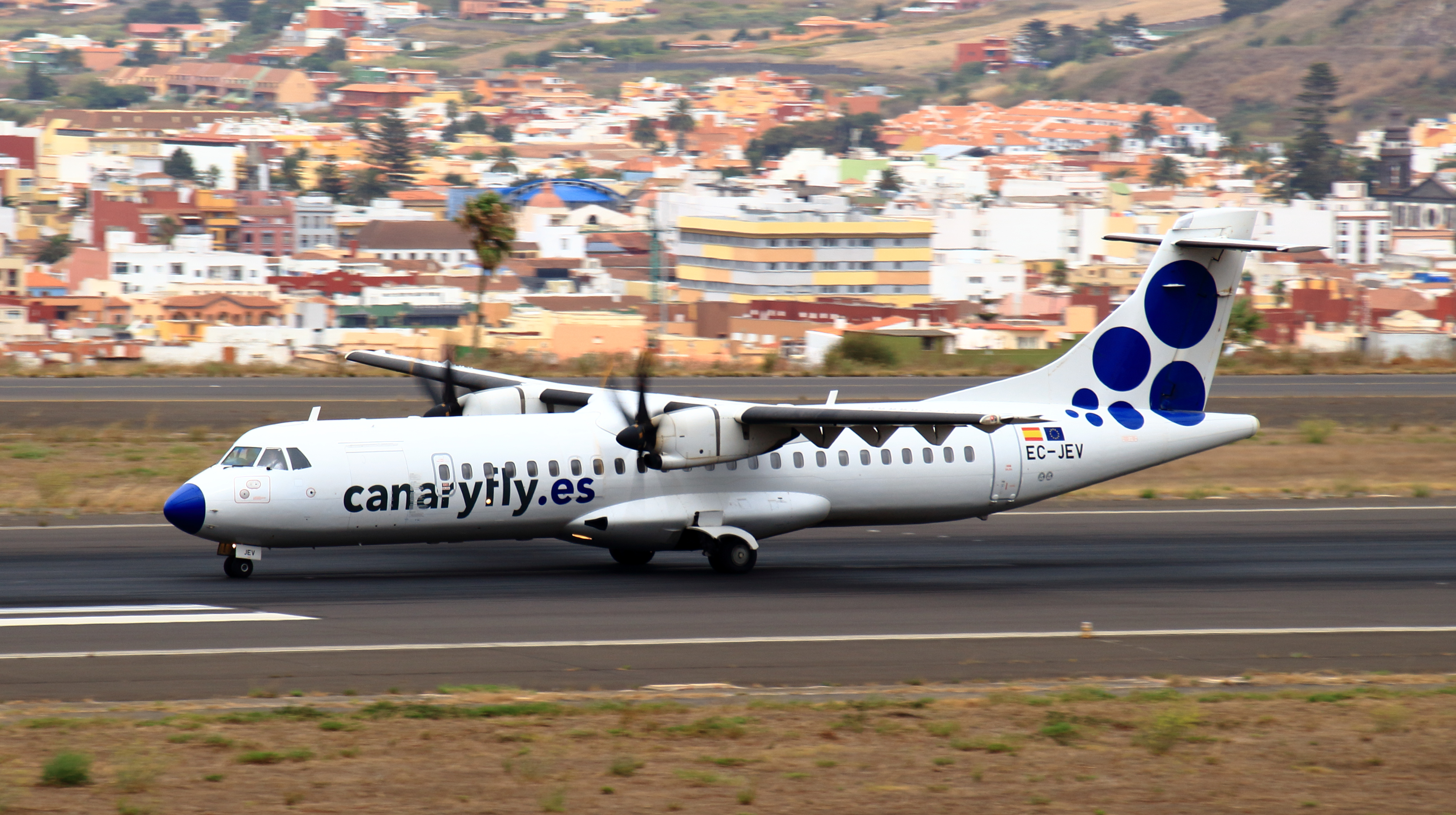
- CanaryFly ATR 72-500 in previous livery
IATA	ICAO	Call sign
PM	CNF	CANARY
- Founded: 2008; 18 years ago
- Commenced operations: 2012; 14 years ago
- Hubs: Gran Canaria Airport
- Fleet size: 5
- Destinations: 8
- Headquarters: Gran Canaria Airport; Gran Canaria, Spain
- Website: canaryfly.es

Canary Fly, S.L., doing business as Canaryfly, is a Spanish airline that operates regular flights between the Canary Islands.

Its head office is in Hangar L at Gran Canaria Airport.

== History ==
Canaryfly was founded in 2008 as Canarias Aeronautica operating flights between Canary Islands and Africa. In May 2012, Canaryfly started its first inter-island route (between different islands of the Canary archipelago) Canaryfly is led by Régulo Andrade and has more than 150 employees in 20 departments.

== Fleet ==
=== Current fleet ===
As of August 2025, Canaryfly operates the following aircraft:

Canaryfly fleet
Aircraft	In service	Orders	Passengers	Notes
ATR 72-500	5	0	68/70	
Total	5	0		

=== Historical fleet ===
Canaryfly historical fleet
Aircraft	In service	Introduced	Retired	Passengers	Notes
ATR 42-320	2	2011	2016	48	
Fairchild-Swearingen SA227-BC Metro III	2	2009	2015	19	
Fairchild-Swearingen SA226-AT Metro II	1	2008	2014	19	
Total	5	-	-	80	

== Routes ==
Canaryfly serves the following domestic destinations (as of March 2017):

- Gran Canaria – Lanzarote
- La Palma - Tenerife
- Fuerteventura – Gran Canaria
- Gran Canaria – Tenerife
- Tenerife – Lanzarote
- Tenerife – Fuerteventura
- Gran Canaria – El Hierro
- Tenerife – El Hierro

=== Airline partnerships ===
Canaryfly currently has a codeshare agreement with Air Europa.
