= San Sebastián Airport =

San Sebastián Airport Aeropuerto de San Sebastián

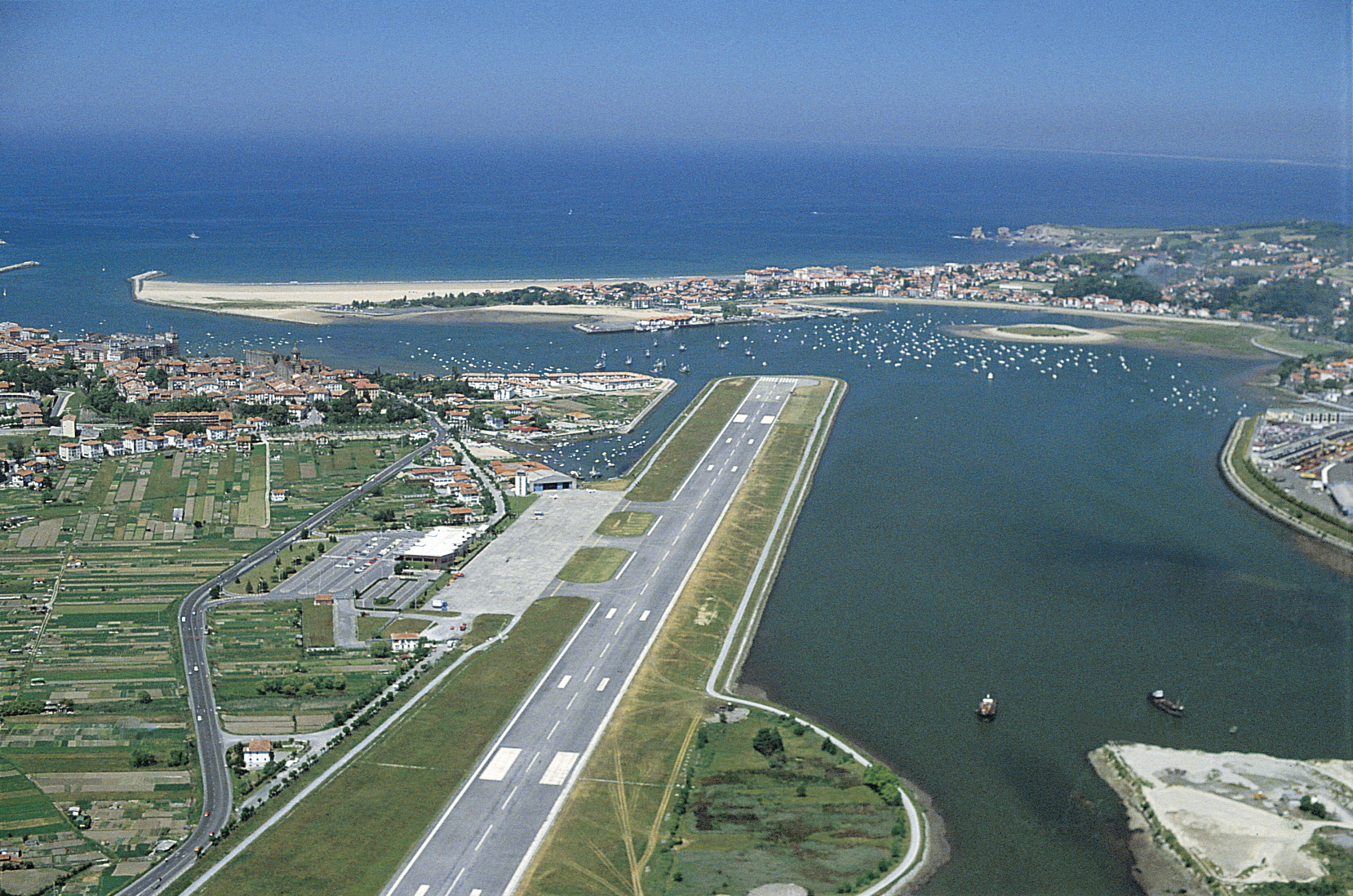
- IATA: EAS; ICAO: LESO

Summary
- Airport type: Public
- Owner/Operator: AENA
- Serves: San Sebastián
- Location: Fuenterrabía
- Elevation AMSL: 15 ft (4.6 m)
- Coordinates: 43°21′23″N 01°47′26″W

Map
- Location within Spain

Runways
Direction	Length		Surface
Direction	ft	m	Surface
04/22	5,755	1,800	Asphalt

Statistics (2023)
- Passengers: 482,662
- Passengers change 22-23: ▲25.8%
- Movements: 6,155
- Movements change 22-23: ▲10.4%
- Cargo (t): 2.5

San Sebastián Airport (IATA: EAS, ICAO: LESO) is the airport serving San Sebastián in Basque Country, Spain. Despite its name, the facilities are located in the municipality of Hondarribia, with the runway stretching like a spit of land along the river Bidasoa right on the Spanish–French border.

The airport primarily serves domestic flights, especially to Madrid, and an international service to London City has commenced as of July 2022. A scheme is in the pipeline to lengthen the runway (2008) in order to meet the requirements established to provide service for larger aircraft. Preliminary plans are still coming up against strong opposition, which has added to the economic difficulties facing the carriers using the airport, making its future all the more uncertain. Other nearby airports are Bilbao Airport (117 km (73 mi) by car) and Biarritz Pays Basque Airport (32 km (20 mi)).

== Airlines and destinations ==
The following airlines operate regular scheduled and charter flights at San Sebastián Airport:

Airlines	Destinations
Binter Canarias	Gran Canaria, Tenerife–North
British Airways	Seasonal: Edinburgh, Glasgow, London–City
Iberia	Madrid
Volotea	Florence (begins 21 September 2026), Seville; Seasonal: Málaga, Menorca, Palma de Mallorca
Vueling	Barcelona

== Public transport ==
- Lurraldebus: a bus line (BI01) connects San Sebastián bus station (Federico Garcia Lorca street) and the airport every hour.
