= Almería Airport =

Almería Airport Aeropuerto de Almería

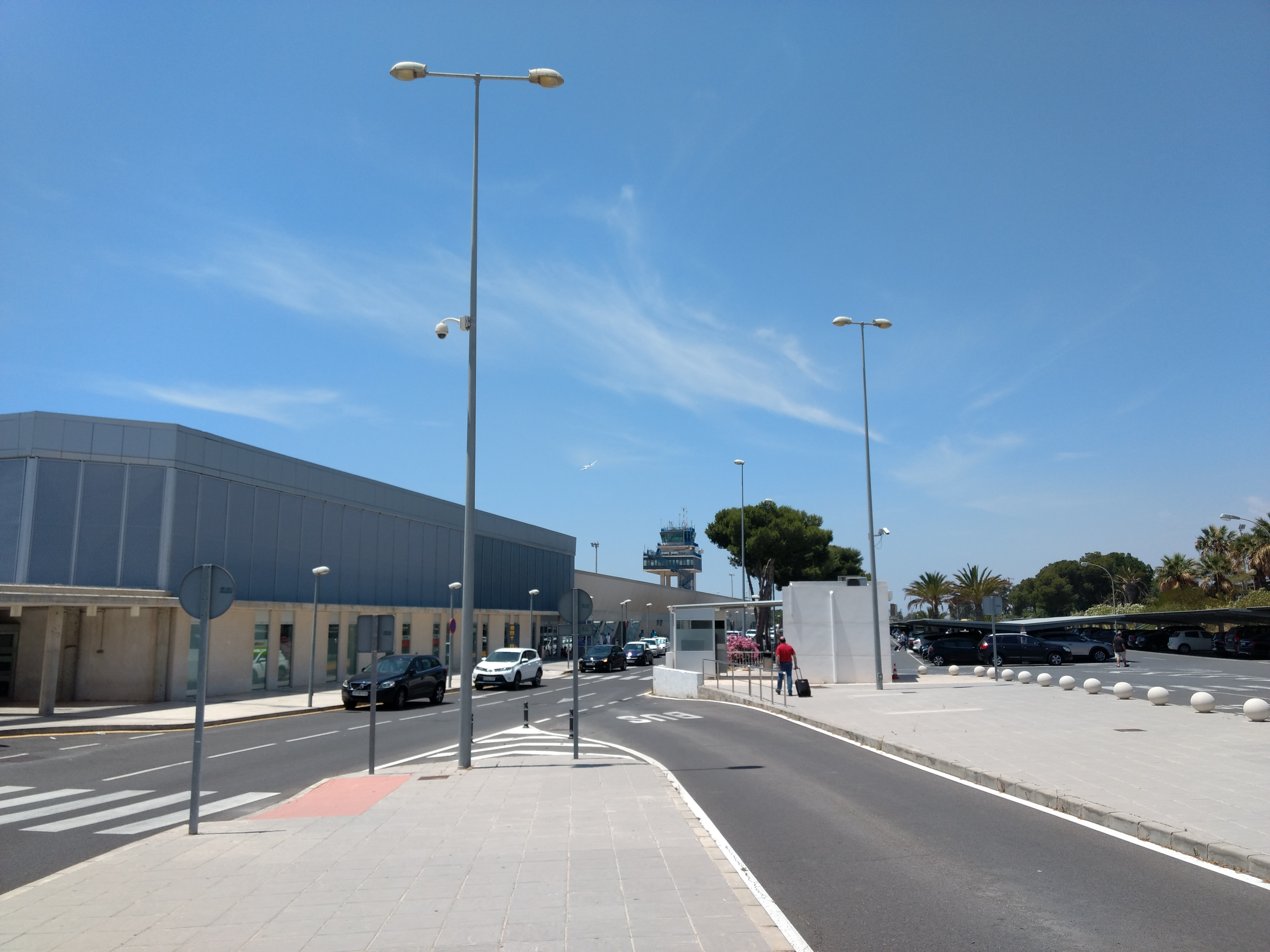
- IATA: LEI; ICAO: LEAM

Summary
- Airport type: Public
- Owner/Operator: AENA
- Serves: Almería, Costa de Almería
- Elevation AMSL: 21 m (69 ft)
- Coordinates: 36°50′38″N 002°22′12″W
- Website: aena.es

Map
- Location within Spain

Runways
| Direction | Length | | Surface |
| Direction | m | ft | Surface |
|---|---|---|---|
| 07/25 | 3,200 | 10,499 | Asphalt |

Statistics (2018)
- Passengers: 992.043
- Passenger change 17-18: ▼1,6%
- Aircraft Movements: 11.946
- Sources: Aena

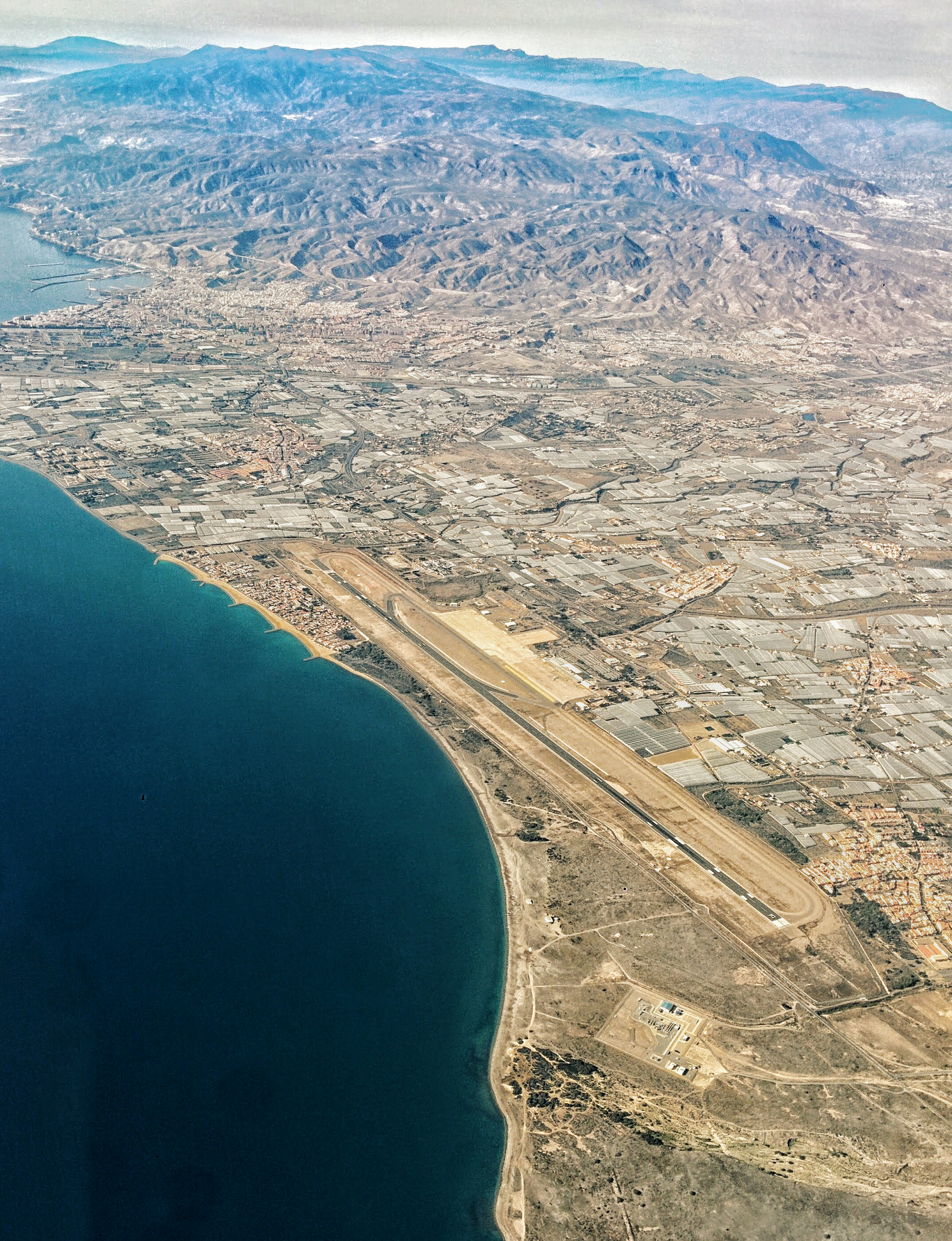
Aerial view of the airport

Almería Airport (Spanish: Aeropuerto de Almería) (IATA: LEI, ICAO: LEAM) is an airport located 9 km (5.6 mi) east of Almería city centre, in the province of Almería in Andalusia, Spain. It is close to the main tourist centers of the province such as the Cabo de Gata-Níjar Natural Park, El Ejido, Mojácar, Roquetas de Mar or Vera.

== Facilities ==
It is a modern airport, with arrivals and departures taking place on the main ground floor. There is a terrace and a small cafe overlooking the runway.

On 14 July 2025, a 5.3 magnitude earthquake struck the area, causing the roof of the terminal building to collapse.

== Airlines and destinations ==
The following airlines operate regular scheduled and charter flights at Almería Airport:

| Airlines | Destinations |
|---|---|
| Air Nostrum | Seasonal charter: Porto |
| Binter Canarias | Gran Canaria |
| easyJet | Liverpool, London–Gatwick; Seasonal: Bristol, London–Luton, London–Southend |
| Iberia | Madrid, Melilla, Seville; Seasonal: Barcelona, Palma de Mallorca |
| Jet2.com | Seasonal: Birmingham, Bristol, Leeds/Bradford, London–Stansted (begins 1 May 2027), Manchester |
| Luxair | Seasonal: Luxembourg |
| Ryanair | Seasonal: Charleroi, London–Stansted, Manchester |
| Smartwings | Seasonal: Budapest, Prague |
| Transavia | Seasonal: Paris–Orly, Rotterdam/The Hague |
| TUI fly Belgium | Seasonal: Brussels |
| Vueling | Barcelona |
| Wizz Air | Bucharest-Otopeni, Madrid (begins 14 December 2026) |

== Statistics ==
=== Annual traffic ===
Traffic by calendar year
| | Passengers | Movements | Cargo (kilos) |
|---|---|---|---|
| 2004 | 830,930 | 15,046 | 51,138 |
| 2005 | 1,073,585 | 18,269 | 52,779 |
| 2006 | 1,055,545 | 18,451 | 35,550 |
| 2007 | 1,206,634 | 20,141 | 19,890 |
| 2008 | 1,024,303 | 18,280 | 21,322 |
| 2009 | 791,837 | 15,391 | 16,238 |
| 2010 | 786,877 | 16,112 | 14,074 |
| 2011 | 780,853 | 14,946 | 9,836 |
| 2012 | 749,720 | 12,643 | 8,632 |
| 2013 | 705,514 | 10,596 | 12,577 |
| 2014 | 745,226 | 10,759 | 8,588 |
| 2015 | 691,240 | 10,278 | 19,224 |
| 2016 | 920,329 | 11,378 | 32,118 |
| 2017 | 1,007,446 | 12,219 | 2,041 |
| 2018 | 991,992 | 11,946 | 9,059 |
| 2019 | 979,406 | 11,777 | 187 |
| 2020 | 200,411 | 5,889 | 0 |
| 2021 | 317,509 | 7,889 | 11 |
| 2022 | 703,380 | 11,045 | 95 |
| 2023 | 775,385 | 11,817 | 46 |
| 2024 | 786,205 | 12,200 | N/A |
Source: Aena Statistics

=== Busiest routes ===
Busiest international routes from LEI (2023)
| Rank | Destination | Passengers | Change 2022/23 |
|---|---|---|---|
| 1 | London-Gatwick | 86,269 | ▼9% |
| 2 | Manchester | 72,297 | ▲5% |
| 3 | Birmingham | 36,897 | ▲9% |
| 4 | London-Stansted | 32,695 | ▲9% |
| 5 | Brussels | 23,756 | ▲19% |
| 6 | Rotterdam/The Hague | 22,357 | ▼6% |
| 7 | Dublin | 21,908 | ▲3% |
| 8 | Charleroi | 21,563 | ▼45% |
| 9 | Paris-Orly | 16,691 | New route |
| 10 | Luxembourg | 13,204 | ▲32% |
| 11 | Prague | 11,775 | ▲10% |
| 12 | Warsaw-Chopin | 9,007 | ▲32% |
| 13 | Düsseldorf | 7,799 | New Route |
| 14 | Leeds/Bradford | 7,420 | ▲7% |
| 15 | Bratislava | 5,225 | ▲4% |
Source: Estadísticas de tráfico aereo

Busiest domestic routes from LEI (2023)
| Rank | Destination | Passengers | Change 2022/23 |
|---|---|---|---|
| 1 | Madrid | 172,840 | ▲22% |
| 2 | Barcelona | 92,421 | ▲10% |
| 3 | Melilla | 49,158 | ▲26% |
| 4 | Seville | 22,606 | ▼8% |
| 5 | Bilbao | 18,281 | ▲22% |
Source: Estadísticas de tráfico aereo
