= Federico García Lorca Granada Airport =

Granada Airport Aeropuerto Federico García Lorca Granada-Jaén

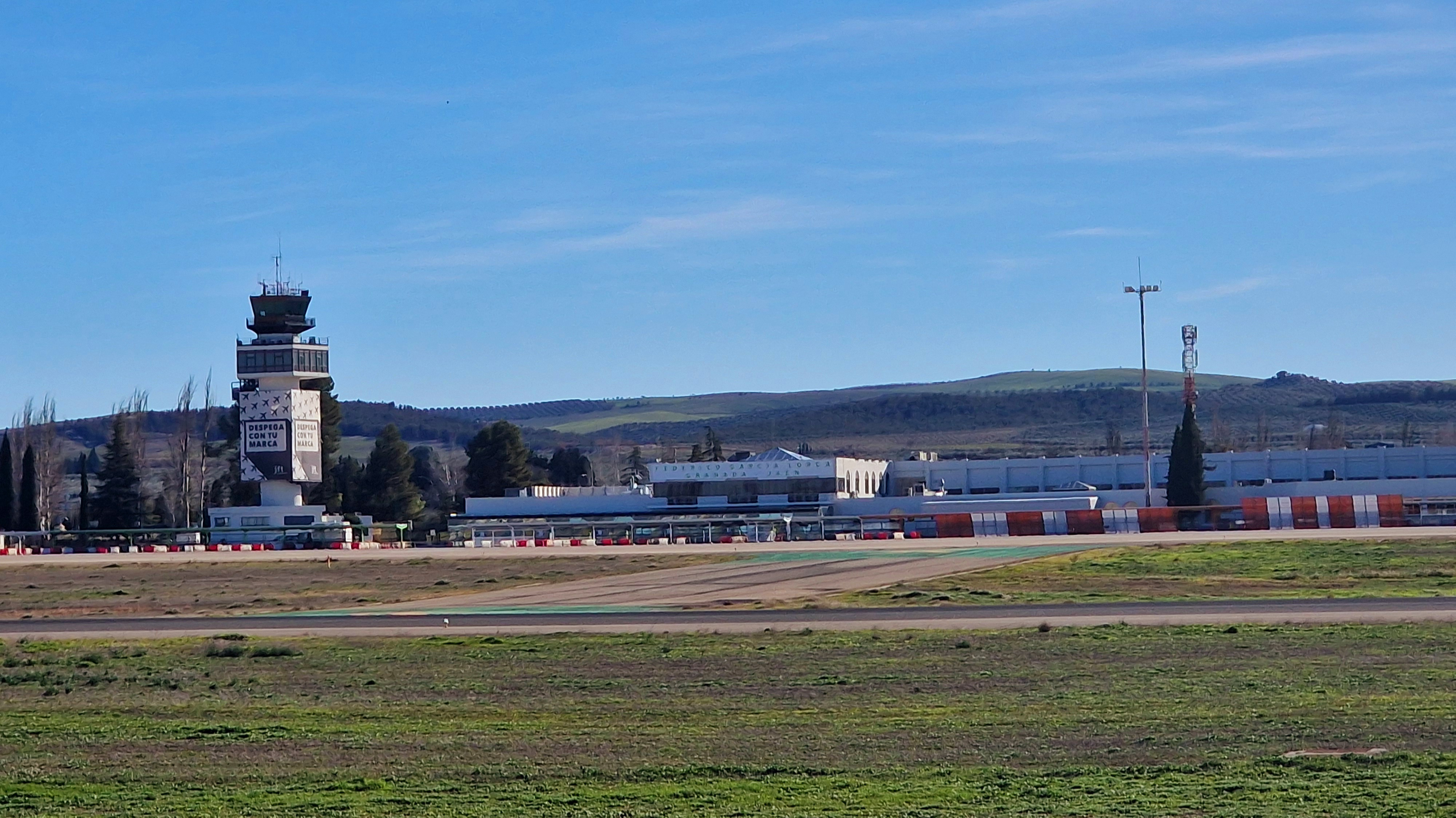
- IATA: GRX; ICAO: LEGR

Summary
- Airport type: Public
- Owner/Operator: AENA
- Serves: Granada
- Location: Granada
- Elevation AMSL: 1,860 ft (570 m)
- Coordinates: 37°11′19″N 03°46′38″W
- Website: aena.es

Map
- Location within Spain

Runways
Direction	Length		Surface
Direction	ft	m	Surface
09/27	9,514	2,900	Asphalt

Statistics (2018)
- Passengers: 1,126,417
- Passengers change 17-18: ▲24.9%
- Movements: 13,714
- Movements change 17-18: ▲9.4%
- Cargo (t): 0.3
- Sources: Aena

Federico García Lorca Granada-Jaén Airport (IATA: GRX, ICAO: LEGR), also known as Granada Airport, is the airport serving the province and city of Granada, in Andalusia, Spain, although it has Jaén in its name. The airport is located near to Chauchina and Santa Fe, about 9.4 miles (15 km) west of Granada and 62.5 miles (100 km) south of Jaén.

Construction of the airport began in 1970 and it opened as Aeropuerto de Granada in 1972. On June 13, 2006, it was officially named after the poet Federico García Lorca, born near Granada.

== Airlines and destinations ==
The following airlines operate regular scheduled and charter flights at Granada Airport:

Airlines	Destinations
Air Europa	Palma de Mallorca
Binter Canarias	Gran Canaria, Tenerife–North
Iberia	Madrid, Melilla
Transavia	Amsterdam
Volotea	Asturias, Madrid (begins 27 November 2026), Nantes, Porto, Santander
Vueling	Barcelona, Bilbao, Gran Canaria, Palma de Mallorca, Paris–Orly,Tenerife–North, Valencia (begins 23 December 2026)
Wizz Air	London-Luton

== Statistics ==
Passenger numbers and operations since 2000:

Year	Passengers	Operations	Difference
2000	509,442	9,906	Steady
2001	514,966	10,444	▲ +1.08 %
2002	486,756	11,188	▼ -5.48 %
2003	525,869	12,804	▲ +8.04 %
2004	590,931	13,584	▲ +12.37 %
2005	875,827	15,746	▲ +48.21 %
2006	1,086,236	17,583	▲ +24.02 %
2007	1,467,625	21,822	▲ +35.11 %
2008	1,422,013	19,279	▼ -3.11%
2009	1,187,813	16,300	▼ -16.47 %
2010	978,107	13,843	▼ -17.65%
2011	872,752	13,142	▼ -10.77%
2012	728,428	11,376	▼ -16.54%
2013	638,289	10,563	▼ -12.37%
2014	650,544	10,348	▲ +1.92%
2015	707,268	11,088	▲ +8.72%
2016	753,142	11,331	▲ +6.49%
2017	901,961	12,539	▲ +20.01%
2018	1,126,417	13,714	▲ +24.9%
2019	1,252,019	14,529	▲ +11.2%
2020	390,218	7,832	▼ -68.8%
2021	502,590	10,063	▲ +28.8%
2022	908,713	14,040	▲ +80.8%

=== Busiest routes ===
Busiest domestic routes from GRX (2023)
Rank	Destination	Passengers	Change 2022/23
1	Barcelona	448,281	▲14%
2	Palma de Mallorca	174,709	▲3%
3	Madrid	157,203	▲23%
4	Gran Canaria	53,894	▲58%
5	Melilla	49,228	▲19%
Source: Estadísticas de tráfico aéreo
