= Gran Canaria Airport =

Spanish airport

Gran Canaria Airport Aeropuerto de Gran Canaria

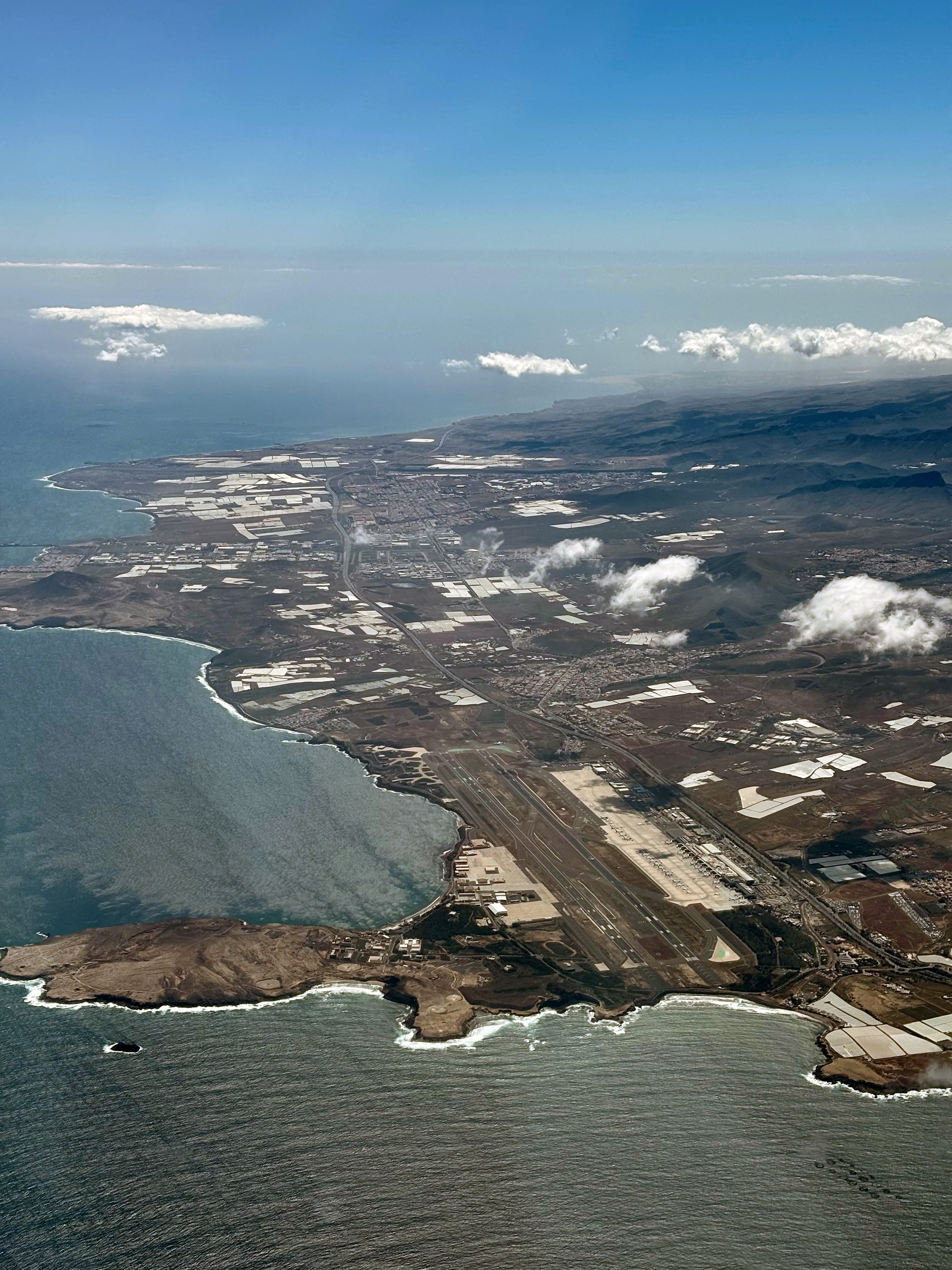
- IATA: LPA; ICAO: GCLP

Summary
- Airport type: Public
- Owner/Operator: AENA
- Serves: Gran Canaria
- Location: Telde and Ingenio, Spain
- Hub for: Binter Canarias; Canaryfly; Vueling; airBaltic; Norwegian Air Shuttle
- Focus city for: Ryanair
- Elevation AMSL: 24 m (79 ft)
- Coordinates: 27°55′55″N 015°23′12″W
- Website: www.aena.es/en/gran-canaria.html

Map
- Location within Spain

Runways
Direction	Length		Surface
Direction	m	ft	Surface
03L/21R	3,100	10,171	Asphalt concrete
03R/21L	3,100	10,171	Solibakke Asphalt concrete

Statistics (2021)
- Passengers: 6,899,523
- Passenger change 20-21: ▲34.4%
- Aircraft movements: 83,983
- Movements change 20-21: ▲24.8%
- Cargo (tonnes): 15,853
- Cargo change 20-21: ▲13.8%
- Sources: Passenger Traffic, AENA; Spanish AIP, AENA

Gran Canaria Airport (IATA: LPA, ICAO: GCLP; Spanish: Aeropuerto de Gran Canaria) is a passenger and freight airport on the island of Gran Canaria, Spain. It is owned and managed by a public enterprise, AENA, and it holds the sixth position in terms of passengers, and fifth in terms of operations and cargo transported. It also ranks first of the Canary Islands in all three categories, although the island of Tenerife has higher passenger numbers overall if statistics from the two airports located on the island are combined. The facility covers 553 hectares (1,370 acres) of land and contains two 3,100 m runways.

The airport is located in the eastern part of Gran Canaria on the Bay of Gando (Bahía de Gando), 19 km (12 mi) to the south of Las Palmas, and 25 km (16 mi) from the popular tourist areas in the south. In 2014, it handled over 10.3 million passengers, ranking 1st in the Canary Islands and 5th in Spain by passenger traffic. Gran Canaria Airport is an important hub for passengers travelling to West Africa (Morocco, Mauritania, Senegal, Cape Verde, among others), and to the Atlantic Isles of Madeira and the Azores. It serves as base for Binter Canarias, Canaryfly, Ryanair, Norwegian Air Shuttle and Vueling. Other airlines use it as a base to operate charter flights to Cape Verde and Gambia (TUI fly Deutschland and TUI fly Nordic), but only in the winter.

== History ==
In 1919, Frenchman Pierre George Latécoère was granted clearance from the French and Spanish governments to establish an airline route between Toulouse and Casablanca. This also included stopovers in Málaga, Alicante and Barcelona. The airport opened on 7 April 1930, after King Alfonso XIII signed a royal order announcing that the military air force installations on the Bay of Gando would become a civilian airfield. In its existence, the airport has become the largest gateway into the Canary Islands, as well as the largest in terms of passenger and cargo operations, although the island of Tenerife has higher passenger numbers overall between the two airports located on the island.

In 1946, the old passenger terminal opened, which took two years to build.

In 1963, improvements to the airport were made. This included new parking spaces, enlargement of the terminal and the provision of a visual approach slope indicator system. In 1964, a transmission station was built. In 1966 a new control tower was completed, replacing the old control tower that was constructed in 1946. In 1970, work began on the current passenger terminal which opened in March 1973. During this time, a second runway was being built and this was completed in 1980.

In December 2010, low-cost carrier Ryanair announced the opening of 3 new bases on the Canary Islands. In addition to Gran Canaria these include Lanzarote and Tenerife South. Ryanair presently operates 30 routes from Gran Canaria. The airport was an official alternative (emergency) landing site for the NASA Space Shuttle, before the ending of the Space Shuttle programme in July 2011.

As of 2011, there was a programme to expand the airport, extending the terminal and creating a new runway.

== Airlines and destinations ==
The following airlines operate regular scheduled and charter flights at Gran Canaria Airport:

Airlines	Destinations
Aer Lingus	Dublin
airBaltic	Seasonal: Ljubljana, Sandefjord; Seasonal charter: Guernsey, Inverness
Air Europa	Madrid
Air Nostrum	León, Melilla, Oporto
Air Transat	Seasonal: Montréal–Trudeau (begins 13 December 2026), Toronto–Pearson (begins 14 December 2026)
Austrian Airlines	Vienna
Binter Canarias	A Coruña, Agadir, Almeria, Asturias, Badajoz, Córdoba, Dakar–Diass, Dakhla, El Hierro, Fuerteventura, Funchal, Granada, Guelmim, Laayoune, La Gomera, Lanzarote, La Palma, Logroño, Madrid, Murcia, Nouakchott, Palma de Mallorca, Pamplona, San Sebastián, Santander, Seville, Tenerife–North, Tenerife–South, Valencia, Valladolid, Vigo, Zaragoza; Seasonal: Ibiza, Jerez de la Frontera, Ponta Delgada, Vitoria
British Airways	London–Gatwick
Brussels Airlines	Brussels
CanaryFly	Fuerteventura, Lanzarote, La Palma, Tenerife–North
Condor	Düsseldorf, Frankfurt, Hamburg, Munich
Corendon Airlines	Hannover, Nuremberg
Discover Airlines	Frankfurt Munich
easyJet	Basel/Mulhouse, Berlin, Bordeaux (begins 28 October 2026), Bristol, Liverpool, London–Luton, Manchester, Milan–Malpensa Nantes; Seasonal: Amsterdam, Belfast–International, Birmingham, Geneva, Glasgow, Milan–Linate, Naples
Edelweiss Air	Zurich
Enter Air	Charter: Katowice, Warsaw Chopin
Eurowings	Seasonal: Cologne, Düsseldorf, Prague
Freebird Airlines Europe	Seasonal charter: Leipzig/Halle
Iberia	Madrid Seasonal: Badajoz
Jet2.com	Bournemouth, Bristol, East Midlands, Edinburgh, Glasgow, Leeds/Bradford, Liverpool, London–Gatwick, London Stansted, Newcastle upon Tyne
Luxair	Luxembourg
Neos	Milan–Malpensa, Verona
Marabu	Leipzig/Halle, Nuremberg
Mauritania Airlines	Nouadhibou
Norwegian Air Shuttle	Billund, Copenhagen, Stockholm–Arlanda, Oslo; Seasonal: Bergen, Gothenburg, Sandefjord, Stavanger, Trondheim; Seasonal charter: Ålesund, Kalmar, Karlstad
Royal Air Maroc	Casablanca, Laayoune
Ryanair	Bergamo, Berlin, Birmingham, Bologna, Bournemouth, Bristol, Budapest, Charleroi, Cologne/Bonn, Cork, Dublin, East Midlands, Edinburgh, Kraków, London–Luton, London–Stansted, Madrid, Málaga, Manchester, Marrakesh, Milan–Malpensa, Newcastle upon Tyne, Rome–Fiumicino, Shannon, Valencia, Vienna, Zaragoza; Seasonal: Barcelona, Glasgow–Prestwick, Pisa, Treviso
Scandinavian Airlines	Seasonal: Gothenburg, Kristiansand
Smartwings	Prague, Warsaw–Chopin
Sunclass Airlines	Billund, Copenhagen, Oslo, Stockholm
TAP Air Portugal	Lisbon
Transavia	Amsterdam, Eindhoven, Rotterdam/The Hague
TUI Airways	Birmingham, Bristol, Cardiff, East Midlands, Glasgow, London–Gatwick, Manchester, Newcastle upon Tyne; Seasonal: Bournemouth, Exeter
TUI fly Belgium	Brussels, Ostend/Bruges
TUI fly Deutschland	Düsseldorf, Frankfurt, Hannover, Munich, Stuttgart
TUI fly Netherlands	Amsterdam, Eindhoven, Groningen, Rotterdam
TUI fly Nordic	Seasonal charter: Borlänge (begins 21 October 2026), Kalmar (begins 29 October 2026), Karlstad (begins 9 November 2026), Sundsvall (begins 25 October 2026), Växjö (resumes 23 October 2026)
Volotea	Asturias, Nantes, Marseille (begins 7 November 2026)
Vueling	Alicante, Barcelona, Bilbao, Malaga, Paris Orly, Santiago de Compostela, Seville, Valencia
Wizz Air	Bucharest–Otopeni, Santiago de Compostela (begins 1 February 2027); Seasonal: Budapest, Wrocław

== Statistics ==
=== Traffic figures ===
	Passengers	Aircraft movements	Cargo (tonnes)
2000	9,376,640	98,063	43,706
2001	9,332,132	93,291	40,860
2002	9,009,756	93,803	39,638
2003	9,181,229	99,712	40,050
2004	9,467,494	104,659	40,934
2005	9,827,157	110,748	40,389
2006	10,286,726	114,949	38,360
2007	10,354,903	114,355	37,491
2008	10,212,123	116,252	33,695
2009	9,155,665	101,557	25,994
2010	9,486,035	103,087	24,528
2011	10,538,829	111,271	23,679
2012	9,892,067	100,393	20,601
2013	9,770,253	95,483	18,781
2014	10,315,732	102,211	19,821
2015	10,627,182	100,417	18,800
2016	12,093,645	111,996	18,588
2017	13,092,117	118,554	18,045
2018	13,573,304	131,027	19,174
2019	13,261,228	126,451	19,739
2020	5,134,252	67,280	13,926
2021	6,899,523	83,983	15,853
2022	12,417,699	119,530	15,830
Source: Aena Statistics

=== Busiest routes ===
Busiest European routes from LPA (2023)
Rank	Destination	Passengers	Change 2022/23
1	Düsseldorf	354,653	▲15%
2	Amsterdam	347,277	▼5%
3	Manchester	311,392	▲6%
4	Frankfurt	300,620	▲17%
5	Oslo	296,887	▲19%
6	London-Gatwick	283,531	▲23%
7	London-Stansted	235,524	▲24%
8	Stockholm-Arlanda	225,175	▲20%
9	Copenhagen	225,032	▲2%
10	Dublin	189,914	▲31%
11	Birmingham	179,309	▲13%
12	Bristol	171,246	▲28%
13	Helsinki	164,262	▲17%
14	Hamburg	154,240	▲24%
15	Munich	148,202	▲9%
16	Zurich	140,754	▲36%
17	Brussels	135,714	▲3%
18	Berlin	132,289	▲4%
19	Cologne/Bonn	123,114	▼14%
20	Newcastle	122,252	▲21%
Source: Estadísticas de tráfico aereo

Busiest intercontinental routes from LPA (2023)
Rank	Destination	Passengers	Change 2022/23
1	Laayoune	47,375	▲13%
2	Marrakech	44,745	▲40%
3	Nouakchott	37,801	▲29%
4	Dakar-Diass	20,433	▲34%
5	Sal	13,689	▲69%
6	Casablanca	10,593	▲18%
7	Dakhla	7,292	▲119%
8	Nouadhibou	6,963	▼49%
9	Boa Vista	6,909	▲25%
10	Guelmim	4,995	▼14%
Source: Estadísticas de tráfico aereo

Busiest domestic routes from LPA (2023)
Rank	Destination	Passengers	Change 2022/23
1	Madrid	1,606,855	▲12%
2	Tenerife-North	901,701	▲14%
3	Lanzarote	811,069	▲9%
4	Fuerteventura	659,647	▲10%
5	Barcelona	508,117	▲8%
6	Seville	278,699	▲7%
7	Málaga	242,673	▲22%
8	La Palma	229,694	▲7%
9	Tenerife-South	221,266	▲17%
10	Santiago de Compostela	165,691	0%
11	Bilbao	133,086	▲7%
12	Valencia	100,997	▲4%
13	Asturias	94,078	▲25%
14	Palma de Mallorca	78,719	▲15%
15	El Hierro	64,983	▲15%
16	La Gomera	55,572	▲59%
17	Granada	53,898	▲58%
18	Vigo	44,788	▲19%
19	Alicante	41,241	▼9%
20	Pamplona	33,490	▲20%
Source: Estadísticas de tráfico aereo

== Ground transportation ==
Plans have existed for several years to construct a rail link connecting the airport to Las Palmas and Maspalomas. As of 2018, the Tren de Gran Canaria scheme was estimated to be underfunded by €1,500 million.

== Military use ==
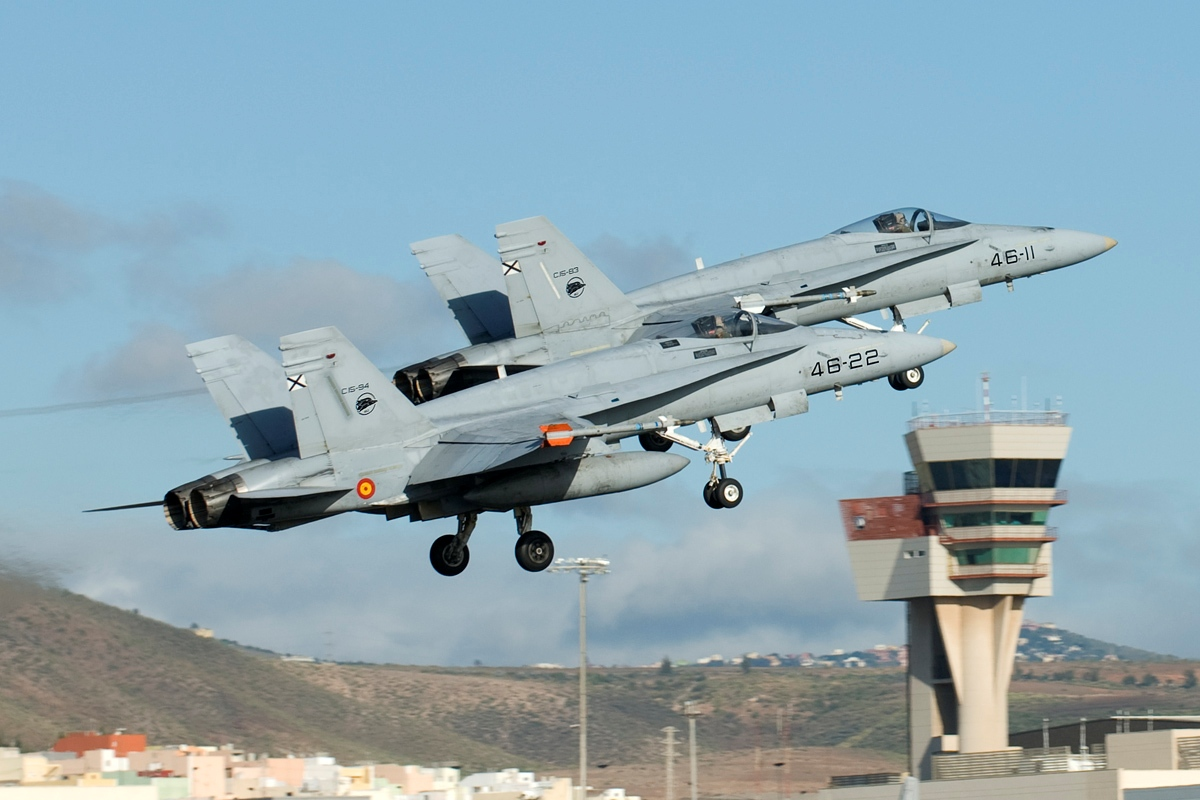
Two F-18s of the Spanish Air Force taking off from Gando Air Base, which shares space with the airport

There is an airbase of the Spanish Air and Space Force to the east of the runways. Beyond several hangars opposite to the passenger terminal, the Gando Air Base (Base Aérea de Gando) contains ten shelters situated on the southern end of the eastern runway. They harbor the Ala 46 with F/A-18 Hornets, CASA 212 and the Eurocopter AS 532 of SAR. Ala 46 or 46 Wing, composed of 462 and 802 fighter squadron, defends the Spanish airspace around the Canary Islands. It is one of the biggest and most important air bases of the Spanish Air and Space Force and is unique for the wide variety of aircraft which it operates.

Military activity was most intense during the mid-1970s, at the time of the crisis of decolonisation of Western Sahara and its occupation by Morocco. Military crises in Western Africa, like the 2013 Mali intervention by France, made Gando Air Base the main air platform for operations in Western Africa area by NATO. In 2006 Spain proposed Gando Air Base as headquarters for the newly created US Africa Command (AFRICOM), but the AFRICOM HQ was ultimately based in Stuttgart (Germany).

The Canary Islands Air Command (Mando Aéreo de Canarias – MACAN) is based in the city of Las Palmas. Canary Islands Air Command is the only territorial general Air Command Air Force in Spain; its mission is the maintenance, preparation and command of air units located in the Canary archipelago. Any Spanish military airplane that lands in the Canary Islands is immediately put at the disposal of the Canary Islands Air Command, who can retain it and use it as long as necessary for missions within the islands. This happens sometimes with heavy military transport, antisubmarine warfare and early warning airplanes; the islands do not have these on a permanent basis. Once the plane is released by the Canary Islands Air Command, it can leave the Canary Islands and reverts to the Air Force Commands of mainland Spain.

The deployment base of Gando Air Base is the Lanzarote Military Airfield (Aeródromo Militar de Lanzarote). Lanzarote Military Airfield has permanently its own Air Force troops platoons and the radar for the air defence (the EVA 22, which covers the Eastern Canary Islands and the maritime area up to the Sahara), but it has no permanently based military planes, using the ones from Gando.

== Other facilities ==
Canaryfly has its head office in Hangar L. Binter Canarias also has its head office on the airport grounds.

== MPAIAC bombing and Tenerife disaster ==
At 1:15 PM on 27 March 1977, a bomb planted by the Movement for the Independence and Autonomy of the Canaries Archipelago (MPAIAC) exploded in a florist's shop on the terminal concourse. Fifteen minutes of warning was given to the airport authorities, who started to evacuate the building; the inside of the terminal was damaged and eight people were injured, one seriously.
