= Neighbours' Alternative =

Neighbours' Alternative Alternativa dos Veciños
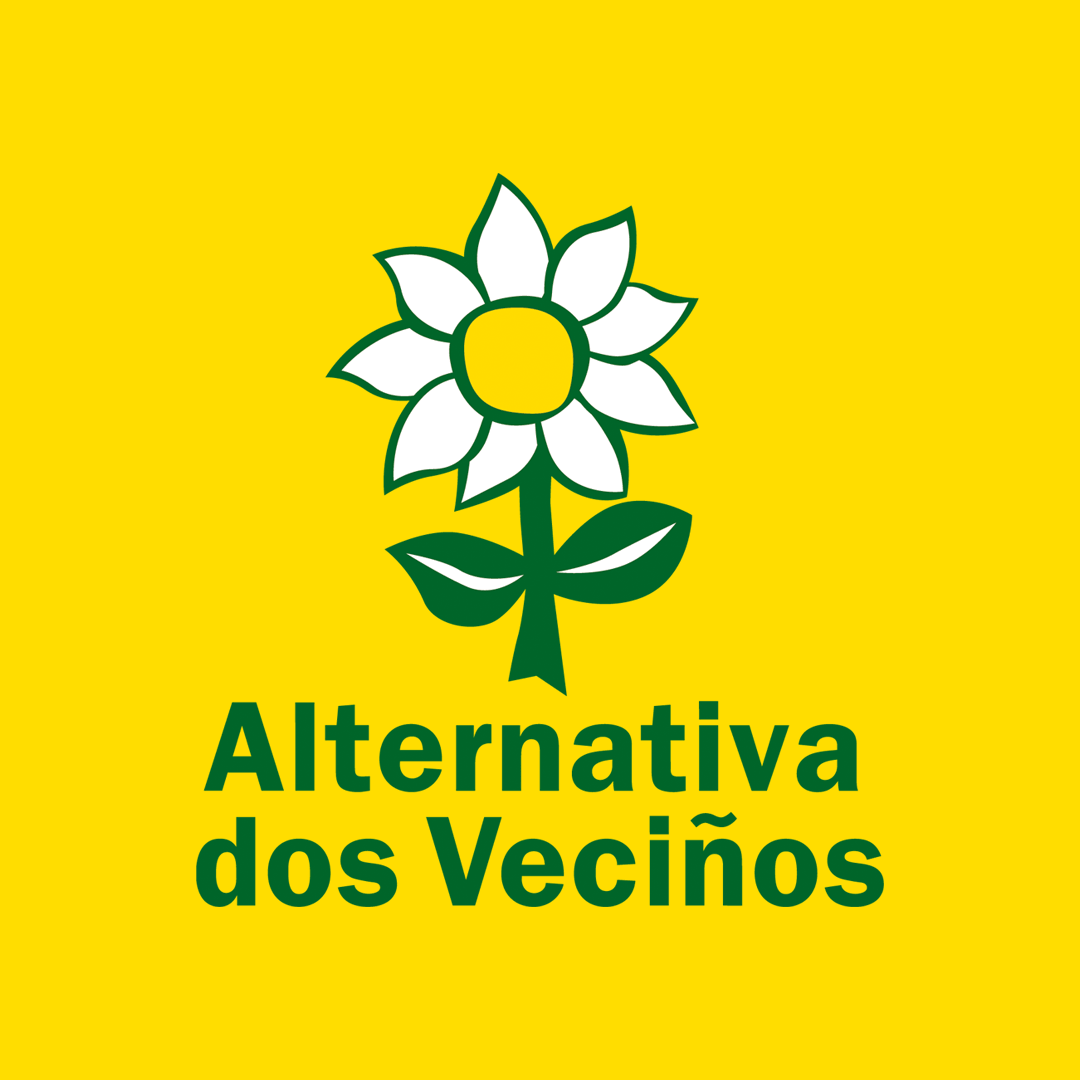
- Abbreviation: AV
- Leader: Ángel "Gelo" García Seoane
- Founded: 1979
- Merger of: Various local neighbor associations
- Ideology: Socialism; Communism; Participative democracy Galicianism; Republicanism; Anti-Zionism
- Political position: Left-wing
- Provincial deputation of A Coruña: 1 / 31
- Mayors: 2 / 93
- Municipal councils (Province of A Coruña): 28 / 1,239

Website
- alternativadosvecinos.org

Neighbours' Alternative (Galician: Alternativa dos Veciños; AV) is a left-wing political party initially active in the Comarca of A Coruña, Galicia that has since expanded to the broader province of A Coruña, as well as to Pontevedra.

== History ==
The party was formed in 1979 by citizen associations of the 9 parroquias of Oleiros to run for the 1979 local elections (the first democratic ones since the Spanish Second Republic in the 1930s). The associations considered that the municipality had chronic problems of pollution, lack of schools, lack of urban planning and privatization of public services. AV won a landslide, with 4,113 votes (65.81% of the total) in the election. José Luis Martínez Suárez became the mayor of the municipality. In the 1983 elections the party suffered a setback, gaining only 5 seats and losing the mayor to the Socialists' Party of Galicia (PSdeG). AV won the elections again in 1987, and has won every single municipal election in Oleiros since then. Ángel "Gelo" García Seoane has been the mayor of the municipality since 2003. Between 1996 and 2003 the mayor was Esther Pita Pita (Seona was disqualified to hold public office during those years). Seoane had also been the mayor between 1987 and 1995. Prior to the 2015 local elections the party expanded its presence outside of Oleiros, to all the Comarca of A Coruña. In those elections AV presented lists in 3 municipalities: Culleredo (won 3 seats), Arteixo (no representation) and A Coruña (no representation). AV wants to expand its presence to more municipalities before the 2019 municipal elections.

== Ideology and government ==
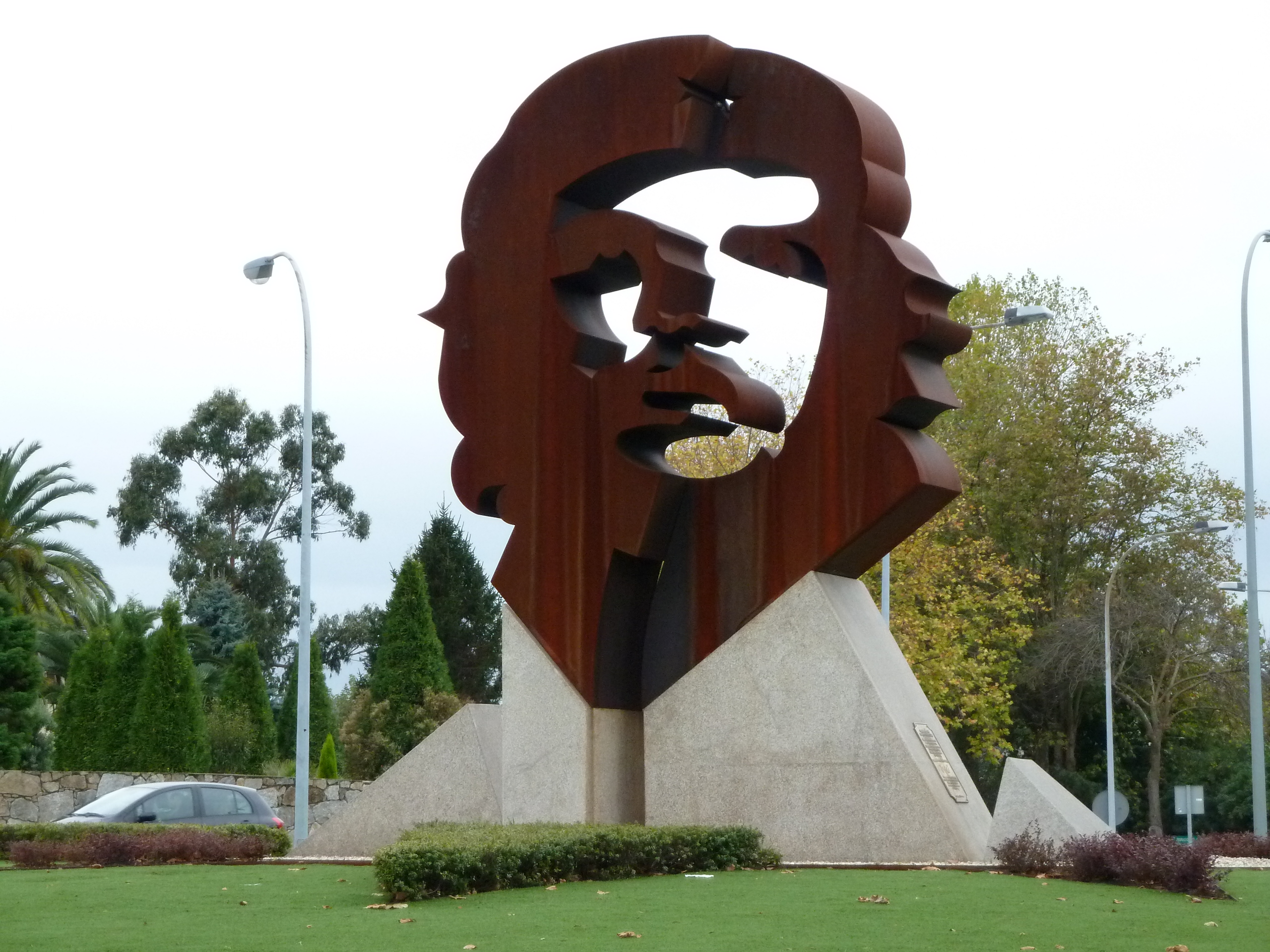
Statue of Che Guevara in Oleiros.

The ideology of the party is based on left-wing politics and direct democracy. AV also supports anti-imperialist movements in Latin America (mainly the Cuban revolution) and Palestine. The mayor of Oleiros is supporter of Fidel Castro, that was declared an honorary councilor of the municipality in 1984, and the municipality has a statue of Che Guevara.

Oleiros is also known for its urban planning, with a wide range of social services and public facilities: gyms and swimming pools, a network of libraries, centers for the elderly, playgrounds, green spaces, auditoriums, houses of municipal property that are given free to neighbors to organize parties and birthdays and artificial turf football fields. Oleiros has the higher indexes of social housing and green spaces per inhabitant of all Galicia.

== Organization ==
AV has a Monitoring Committee, an Executive Committee and permanent councils in the 9 parishes of the municipality. The party has a system of primary elections in which candidates are previously chosen by the parish assemblies of the party, to guarantee that all parishes have representation in the final list. The 30 elected candidates (3 for each parish) then run in an open primary election. 3,119 (11,8% of the registered voters of the municipality) people participated in the 2015 primaries.

People who are elected as council members are controlled by the Executive Committee. This system of citizen involvement in municipal management is also reflected in the participatory budget of the municipal council, in which the local citizen entities of each of the 9 parishes take part.

== Election results ==
Election	Municipal council of Oleiros				
Election	Votes	%	Position	Seats	+/–
1979	4,113	65.81	1º	12 / 17	New
1983	1,787	26.38	2º	5 / 17	▼7
1987	3,296	40.46	1º	8 / 17	▲3
1991	4,362	53.20	1º	10 / 17	▲2
1995	4,913	42.53	1º	9 / 21	▼1
1999	4,913	41.22	1º	9 / 21	=
2003	7,286	45.40	1º	10 / 21	▲1
2007	6,249	37.37	1º	9 / 21	▼1
2011	8,386	48.47	1º	11 / 21	▲3
2015	9,353	60.61	1º	14 / 21	▲3
2019	10,498	58.71	1º	13 / 21	▼1
2023	9,274	54.28	1º	13 / 21	=

Election	Municipal council of Culleredo				
Election	Votes	%	Position	Seats	+/–
2015	1,849	13.94	3º	3 / 21	New
2019	1,632	11.55	4º	3 / 21	=
2023	1.491	10.66	4º	2 / 21	▼1

Election	Municipal council of Arteixo				
Election	Votes	%	Position	Seats	+/–
2015	633	4.52	5º	0 / 21	New
2019	938	6.50	4º	1 / 21	▲1
2023	974	6.81	4º	1 / 21	=

Election	City council of A Coruña				
Election	Votes	%	Position	Seats	+/–
2015	1,834	1.54	7º	0 / 21	New
2019	2,916	2.33	6º	0 / 21	=
2023	2,546	2.2	7º	0 / 21	=

Election	Municipal council of Cambre				
Election	Votes	%	Position	Seats	+/–
2019	1,028	8.71	5º	2 / 21	New
2023	1,182	10.19	5º	2 / 21	=

Election	Municipal council of Sada				
Election	Votes	%	Position	Seats	+/–
2019	788	9.28	5º	2 / 17	New
2023	402	4.89	6º	0 / 17	▼2

Election	Municipal council of Carral				
Election	Votes	%	Position	Seats	+/–
2019	1,503	37.98	1º	5 / 13	New
2023	1.896	48.14	1º	7 / 13	▲2

Election	Municipal council of Bergondo				
Election	Votes	%	Position	Seats	+/–
2019	740	19.37	3º	2 / 13	New
2023	828	21.07	3º	3 / 13	▲1
