= August 13 =

August 13 this year in various calendars
- Thursday, 13 August 2026
| Akan | Kwayaw |
| Armenian | 24 Nawasardi 1476 |
| Aztec | Pānquetzaliztli 15, 8 Calli |
| Babylonian | 29 Du'uzu, 2337 SE |
| Balinese pawukon | Luang, Pepet, Beteng, Sri, Paing, Was, Wraspati of Tambir, Sri, Jangur, Raja |
| Bengali | 29 Shrabon, BS 1433 |
| Chinese | Yin Earth Goat・Well Mansion; Fire Horse Year, Month 7, Day 1 (Liqiu, 10 days until Chushu) |
| Common Era | 13 August 2026 CE |
| Coptic | 7 Mesori, AM 1742 |
| Egyptian | 29 Choiak, 2775 NE |
| Ethiopian | 7 Naḥasē, 2018 Amätä Məhrät |
| French Republican | Décade III, Sextidi de Thermidor de l'Année 234 de la République |
| Gregorian | 13 August, AD 2026 |
| Hebrew | 30 Av, AM 5786 |
| Hindu | Āśleṣā・Varīyas; Solar: 28 Śrāvaṇa, 1948 SE; Lunisolar: Pratipada, Śukla pakṣa of Śrāvaṇa, 2083 VE; Rāudra・5127 KY・1,872,800 |
| Icelandic | Fimmtudagur, 19 Heyannir 2026 |
| Islamic | 28 Safar, AH 1448 (using tabular method) |
| ISO week date | 2026-W33-4 |
| Japanese | 1 Fumizuki, Reiwa 8 (Risshū, 10 days until Shosho) |
| Julian | 31 July, AD 2026 (AM 7534) |
| Julian day | 2461266 |
| Korean | 1 Wonsungidal, 4359 DE |
| Maya | 13.0.13.15.3; 16 Yaxkin, 8 Akbal |
| Roman | Pridie Kalendas Augustas, MMDCCLXXIX AUC |
| Solar Hijri | 22 Mordad, SH 1405 |
| Tibetan | 1 gro bzhin, me pho rta 2153 or 1772 or 1000 |

| << | August | | | | | >> |
| Su | Mo | Tu | We | Th | Fr | Sa |
| | | | | | | 1 |
| 2 | 3 | 4 | 5 | 6 | 7 | 8 |
| 9 | 10 | 11 | 12 | 13 | 14 | 15 |
| 16 | 17 | 18 | 19 | 20 | 21 | 22 |
| 23 | 24 | 25 | 26 | 27 | 28 | 29 |
| 30 | 31 |
2026

August 13 in recent years
2026 (Thursday)
2025 (Wednesday)
2024 (Tuesday)
2023 (Sunday)
2022 (Saturday)
2021 (Friday)
2020 (Thursday)
2019 (Tuesday)
2018 (Monday)
2017 (Sunday)

August 13 is the 225th day of the year (226th in leap years) in the Gregorian calendar; 140 days remain until the end of the year.

== Events ==
=== Pre-1600 ===
- 29 BC – Octavian holds the first of three consecutive triumphs in Rome to celebrate the victory over the Dalmatian tribes.
- 523 – John I becomes the new Pope after the death of Pope Hormisdas.
- 554 – Emperor Justinian I issues a Pragmatic Sanction in which he organises the renewed Roman rule over the recently re-conquered Italy. All privileges granted to Romans under the Gothic rule until 538 are confirmed, confiscated estates restored and the participation of the Roman Church in civil government increased.
- 582 – Maurice is crowned Emperor of the Byzantine Empire by the dying emperor Tiberius.
- 871 – Emperor Louis II of Italy and Empress Engelberga are captured by Prince Adelchis of Benevento.
- 900 – Count Reginar I of Hainault rises against Zwentibold of Lotharingia and slays him near present-day Susteren.
- 1099 – Election of Pope Paschal II following the death of pope Urban II in the previous month.
- 1415 – The English invasion of France begins when English king Henry V lands in France.
- 1516 – The Treaty of Noyon between France and Spain is signed. Francis I of France recognizes Charles's claim to Naples, and Charles V, Holy Roman Emperor, recognizes Francis's claim to Milan.
- 1521 – After an extended siege, forces led by Spanish conquistador Hernán Cortés capture Tlatoani Cuauhtémoc and conquer the Aztec capital of Tenochtitlan.
- 1532 – Union of Brittany and France: The Duchy of Brittany is absorbed into the Kingdom of France.
- 1536 – Buddhist monks from Kyoto, Japan's Enryaku-ji temple set fire to 21 Nichiren temples throughout Kyoto in what will be known as the Tenbun Hokke Disturbance.
- 1553 – Michael Servetus is arrested by John Calvin in Geneva, Switzerland as a heretic.

=== 1601–1900 ===
- 1624 – The French king Louis XIII appoints Cardinal Richelieu as prime minister.
- 1645 – Sweden and Denmark sign the Peace of Brömsebro.
- 1650 – Colonel George Monck of the English Army forms Monck's Regiment of Foot, which will later become the Coldstream Guards.
- 1704 – War of the Spanish Succession: Battle of Blenheim: English and Imperial forces are victorious over French and Bavarian troops.
- 1724 – Johann Sebastian Bach leads the first performance of Nimm von uns, Herr, du treuer Gott, BWV 101, a chorale cantata on a famous tune.
- 1779 – American Revolutionary War: The Royal Navy defeats the Penobscot Expedition with the most significant loss of United States naval forces prior to the attack on Pearl Harbor.
- 1792 – King Louis XVI of France is formally arrested by the National Tribunal, and declared an enemy of the people.
- 1806 – Battle of Mišar during the Serbian Revolution begins. The battle ends two days later with a Serbian victory over the Ottomans.
- 1814 – The Convention of London, a treaty between the United Kingdom and the United Netherlands, is signed in London, England.
- 1868 – The 8.5–9.0 M_{w} Arica earthquake strikes southern Peru with a maximum Mercalli intensity of XI (Extreme), causing 25,000+ deaths and a destructive basin-wide tsunami that affected Hawaii and New Zealand.
- 1876 – A performance of Wagner's Das Rheingold opens the first Ring cycle at the first Bayreuth Festival.
- 1889 – William Gray of Hartford, Connecticut is granted United States Patent Number 408,709 for "Coin-controlled apparatus for telephones."
- 1898 – Spanish–American War: Spanish and American forces engage in a mock battle for Manila, after which the Spanish commander surrendered in order to keep the city out of Filipino rebel hands.
- 1898 – Carl Gustav Witt discovers 433 Eros, the first near-Earth asteroid to be found.
- 1900 – The steamer Deutschland of Hamburg America Lines sets a new record for the eastward passage when it docks in Plymouth, England, five days, 11 hours and 45 minutes after sailing from New York, breaking by three hours, six minutes its previous mark in its maiden voyage in July.

=== 1901–present ===
- 1905 – Norwegians vote to end the union with Sweden.
- 1906 – The all black infantrymen of the U.S. Army's 25th Infantry Regiment are accused of killing a white bartender and wounding a white police officer in Brownsville, Texas, despite exculpatory evidence; all are later dishonorably discharged. (Their records were later restored to reflect honorable discharges but there were no financial settlements.)
- 1913 – First production in the UK of stainless steel by Harry Brearley.
- 1918 – Women enlist in the United States Marine Corps for the first time. Opha May Johnson is the first woman to enlist.
- 1918 – Bayerische Motoren Werke AG (BMW) is established as a public company in Germany.
- 1920 – Polish–Soviet War: The Battle of Warsaw begins and will last till August 25. The Red Army is defeated.
- 1937 – Second Sino-Japanese War: The Battle of Shanghai begins.
- 1940 – World War II: The German Luftwaffe launches an air operation, codenamed Adlertag, during the Battle of Britain in an attempt to destroy the British Royal Air Force.
- 1942 – Major General Eugene Reybold of the U.S. Army Corps of Engineers authorizes the construction of facilities that would house the "Development of Substitute Materials" project, better known as the Manhattan Project.
- 1944 – World War II: German troops begin the pillage and razing of Anogeia in Crete that would continue until September 5.
- 1954 – Radio Pakistan broadcasts the "Qaumī Tarāna", the national anthem of Pakistan for the first time.
- 1960 – The Central African Republic declares independence from France.
- 1961 – Cold War: East Germany closes the border between the eastern and western sectors of Berlin to thwart its inhabitants' attempts to escape to the West, and construction of the Berlin Wall is started. The day is known as Barbed Wire Sunday.
- 1964 – Peter Allen and Gwynne Evans are hanged for the murder of John Alan West becoming the last people executed in the United Kingdom.
- 1967 – Two young women became the first fatal victims of grizzly bear attacks in the 57-year history of Montana's Glacier National Park in separate incidents.
- 1968 – Alexandros Panagoulis attempts to assassinate the Greek dictator Colonel Georgios Papadopoulos in Varkiza, Athens.
- 1969 – The Apollo 11 astronauts enjoy a ticker-tape parade in New York City. That evening, at a state dinner in Los Angeles, they are awarded the Presidential Medal of Freedom by U.S. President Richard Nixon.
- 1973 – Aviaco Flight 118 crashes on approach to A Coruña Airport in A Coruña, Spain, killing all 85 people on the plane and one other one the ground.
- 1977 – Members of the British National Front (NF) clash with anti-NF demonstrators in Lewisham, London, resulting in 214 arrests and at least 111 injuries.
- 1978 – One hundred fifty Palestinians in Beirut are killed in a terrorist attack during the second phase of the Lebanese Civil War.
- 1990 – A mainland Chinese fishing boat Min Ping Yu No. 5202 is hit by a Taiwanese naval vessel and sinks in a repatriation operation of mainland Chinese immigrants, resulting in 21 deaths. This is the second tragedy less than a month after Min Ping Yu No. 5540 incident.
- 1997 - The animated TV comedy South Park airs its very first episode.
- 2004 – One hundred fifty-six Congolese Tutsi refugees are massacred at the Gatumba refugee camp in Burundi.
- 2008 – Russo-Georgian War: Russian units occupy the Georgian city of Gori.
- 2014 – A Cessna Citation Excel crashes in Santos, São Paulo, Brazil killing all seven people aboard, including Brazilian Socialist Party presidential candidate Eduardo Campos.
- 2015 – At least 76 people are killed and 212 others are wounded in a truck bombing in Baghdad, Iraq.
- 2020 – Israel–United Arab Emirates relations are formally established.

== Births ==
=== Pre-1600 ===
- 985 – Al-Hakim bi-Amr Allah, Fatimid caliph (died 1021)
- 1311 – Alfonso XI, king of Castile and León (died 1350)
- 1567 – Samuel de Champlain, French explorer (died 1635)
- 1584 – Theophilus Howard, 2nd Earl of Suffolk, English admiral and politician, Lord Lieutenant of Cumberland (died 1640)
- 1592 – William, Count of Nassau-Siegen, German count, field marshal of the Dutch State Army (died 1642)

=== 1601–1900 ===
- 1625 – Rasmus Bartholin, Danish physician, mathematician, and physicist (died 1698)
- 1662 – Charles Seymour, 6th Duke of Somerset, English politician, Lord President of the Council (died 1748)
- 1666 – William Wotton, English linguist and scholar (died 1727)
- 1700 – Heinrich von Brühl, Polish-German politician (died 1763)
- 1717 – Louis François, Prince of Conti (died 1776)
- 1756 – James Gillray, English caricaturist and printmaker (died 1815)
- 1764 – Louis Baraguey d'Hilliers, French general (died 1813)
- 1790 – William Wentworth, Australian journalist, explorer, and politician (died 1872)
- 1803 – Vladimir Odoyevsky, Russian philosopher and critic (died 1869)
- 1814 – Anders Jonas Ångström, Swedish physicist and astronomer (died 1874)
- 1818 – Lucy Stone, American abolitionist and suffragist (died 1893)
- 1819 – Sir George Stokes, 1st Baronet, Anglo-Irish mathematician and physicist (died 1903)
- 1820 – George Grove, English musicologist and historian (died 1900)
- 1823 – Goldwin Smith, English-Canadian historian and journalist (died 1910)
- 1824 – John J. Robison, American politician in Michigan (died 1897)
- 1831 – Salomon Jadassohn, German pianist and composer (died 1902)
- 1841 – Johnny Mullagh, Australian cricketer (died 1891)
- 1842 – Charles Wells, English brewer, founded Charles Wells Ltd (died 1914)
- 1849 – Leonora Barry, Irish-born American social activist (died 1930)
- 1851 – Felix Adler, German-American religious leader and educator (died 1933)
- 1860 – Annie Oakley, American target shooter (died 1926)
- 1866 – Giovanni Agnelli, Italian businessman, founded Fiat S.p.A. (died 1945)
- 1867 – George Luks, American painter and illustrator (died 1933)
- 1871 – Karl Liebknecht, German politician, co-founded Communist Party of Germany (died 1919)
- 1872 – Richard Willstätter, German-Swiss chemist and academic, Nobel Prize Laureate (died 1942)
- 1879 – John Ireland, English composer and educator (died 1962)
- 1884 – Harry Dean, English cricketer and coach (died 1957)
- 1888 – John Logie Baird, Scottish engineer, invented the television (died 1946)
- 1888 – Gleb W. Derujinsky, Russian-American sculptor (died 1975)
- 1889 – Camillien Houde, Canadian lawyer and politician, 34th Mayor of Montreal (died 1958)
- 1895 – István Barta, Hungarian water polo player (died 1948)
- 1895 – Bert Lahr, American actor (died 1967)
- 1898 – Jean Borotra, French tennis player (died 1994)
- 1898 – Regis Toomey, American actor (died 1991)
- 1899 – Alfred Hitchcock, English-American director and producer (died 1980)
- 1899 – José Ramón Guizado, Panamanian politician, 17th President of Panama (died 1964)

=== 1901–present ===
- 1902 – Felix Wankel, German engineer (died 1988)
- 1904 – Buddy Rogers, American actor and musician (died 1999)
- 1904 – Margaret Tafoya, Native American Pueblo potter (died 2001)
- 1906 – Chuck Carroll, American football player and lawyer (died 2003)
- 1906 – Art Shires, American baseball player and boxer (died 1967)
- 1907 – Alfried Krupp, German arms manufacturer, convicted war criminal, and Olympic yacht competitor (died 1967)
- 1907 – Basil Spence, Scottish architect, designed Coventry Cathedral (died 1976)
- 1908 – Gene Raymond, American actor and pilot (died 1998)
- 1909 – Brian Lawrance, Australian bandleader (died 1983)
- 1911 – William Bernbach, American advertiser, co-founded DDB Worldwide (died 1982)
- 1912 – Claire Cribbs, American basketball player and coach (died 1985)
- 1912 – Ben Hogan, American golfer and sportscaster (died 1997)
- 1912 – Salvador Luria, Italian-American microbiologist and academic, Nobel Prize laureate (died 1991)
- 1912 – Big Chief Russell Moore, Pima-American jazz trombonist (Lionel Hampton; Louis Armstrong), and composer (died 1983)
- 1913 – Makarios III, Greek archbishop and politician, 1st President of Cyprus (died 1977)
- 1913 – Fred Davis, English snooker player (died 1998)
- 1913 – Anna Mae Winburn, African American jazz singer and bandleader of all-female, racially integrated big band (died 1999)
- 1914 – Grace Bates, American mathematician and academic (died 1996)
- 1917 – Sid Gordon, American baseball player (died 1975)
- 1918 – Noor Hassanali, Trinidadian lawyer and politician, 2nd President of Trinidad and Tobago (died 2006)
- 1918 – Frederick Sanger, English biochemist and academic, Nobel Prize laureate (died 2013)
- 1919 – Rex Humbard, American evangelist and television host (died 2007)
- 1919 – George Shearing, English jazz pianist and bandleader (died 2011)
- 1920 – Neville Brand, American actor (died 1992)
- 1921 – Louis Frémaux, French conductor (died 2017)
- 1921 – Jimmy McCracklin, American blues/R&B singer-songwriter and pianist (died 2012)
- 1921 – Mary Lee, Scottish singer (died 2022)
- 1922 – Chuck Gilmur, American basketball player, coach, and educator (died 2011)
- 1925 – Benny Bailey, American trumpet player, songwriter, and producer (died 2005)
- 1925 – José Alfredo Martínez de Hoz, Argentine executive and policy maker (died 2013)
- 1926 – Fidel Castro, Cuban lawyer and politician, ex-President of Cuba (died 2016)
- 1928 – William Bright, American linguist and toponymist (died 2006)
- 1928 – John Tidmarsh, English journalist and radio host (died 2019)
- 1929 – Pat Harrington, Jr., American actor (died 2016)
- 1930 – Wilfried Hilker, German footballer and referee
- 1930 – Don Ho, American singer and ukulele player (died 2007)
- 1930 – Bernard Manning, English comedian (died 2007)
- 1930 – Wilmer Mizell, American baseball player and politician (died 1999)
- 1930 – Bob Wiesler, American baseball player (died 2014)
- 1933 – Joycelyn Elders, American admiral and physician, 15th Surgeon General of the United States
- 1935 – Alex de Renzy, American director and producer (died 2001)
- 1935 – Mudcat Grant, American baseball player and sportscaster (died 2021)
- 1938 – Dave "Baby" Cortez, American R&B pianist, organist, and composer (died 2022)
- 1938 – Bill Masterton, Canadian ice hockey player (died 1968)
- 1940 – Bill Musselman, American basketball player and coach (died 2000)
- 1942 – Hissène Habré, Chadian politician and war criminal, 5th president of Chad (died 2021)
- 1942 – Son Seals, American electric blues guitarist and singer (died 2004)
- 1943 – Fred Hill, American football player
- 1943 – Ertha Pascal-Trouillot, President of Haiti
- 1943 – Michael Willetts, English sergeant; George Cross recipient (died 1971)
- 1945 – Lars Engqvist, Swedish politician, Deputy Prime Minister of Sweden
- 1945 – Gary Gregor, American basketball player
- 1945 – Robin Jackman, Indian-English cricketer and sportscaster (died 2020)
- 1945 – Howard Marks, Welsh cannabis smuggler, writer, and legalisation campaigner (died 2016)
- 1946 – Janet Yellen, American economist, 78th United States secretary of the treasury
- 1947 – Fred Stanley, American baseball player and manager
- 1947 – John Stocker, Canadian voice actor and director
- 1947 – Margareta Winberg, Swedish politician, Deputy Prime Minister of Sweden
- 1949 – Jim Brunzell, American wrestler
- 1949 – Bobby Clarke, Canadian ice hockey player and manager
- 1949 – Philippe Petit, French tightrope walker
- 1949 – Willy Rey, Dutch-Canadian model (died 1973)
- 1950 – Jane Carr, English actress
- 1950 – Rusty Gerhardt, American baseball player, coach, and manager
- 1951 – Dan Fogelberg, American singer-songwriter and guitarist (died 2007)
- 1952 – Dave Carter, American singer-songwriter and guitarist (died 2002)
- 1952 – Gary Gibbs, American football player and coach
- 1952 – Suzanne Muldowney, American performance artist
- 1952 – Herb Ritts, American photographer and director (died 2002)
- 1952 – Hughie Thomasson, American singer-songwriter and guitarist (died 2007)
- 1952 – Eugenio Lopez III, Filipino businessperson, CEO and chairman of ABS-CBN Corporation
- 1953 – Tom Cohen, American philosopher, theorist, and academic
- 1953 – Ron Hilditch, Australian rugby league player and coach
- 1953 – Thomas Pogge, German philosopher and academic
- 1953 – Peter Wright, English historian and author
- 1954 – Nico Assumpção, Brazilian bass player (died 2001)
- 1955 – Keith Ahlers, English race car driver
- 1955 – Hideo Fukuyama, Japanese race car driver
- 1955 – Paul Greengrass, English director and screenwriter
- 1955 – Mulgrew Miller, American jazz pianist, (Duke Ellington; Betty Carter; Art Blakey), composer, and educator (died 2013)
- 1956 – Rohinton Fali Nariman, Judge of the Supreme Court of India
- 1958 – David Feherty, Northern Irish golfer and sportscaster
- 1958 – Feargal Sharkey, Northern Irish singer-songwriter
- 1958 – Randy Shughart, American sergeant, Medal of Honor recipient (died 1993)
- 1959 – Bruce French, English cricketer and coach
- 1959 – Tom Niedenfuer, American baseball player
- 1960 – Ivar Stukolkin, Estonian swimmer
- 1961 – Koji Kondo, Japanese composer and sound director
- 1961 – Neil Mallender, English cricketer and umpire
- 1961 – Tom Perrotta, American novelist and screenwriter
- 1963 – Steve Higgins, American talk show co-host and announcer, writer, producer, comedian and impressionist
- 1963 – Valerie Plame, American CIA agent and author
- 1963 – Sridevi, Indian actress (died 2018)
- 1964 – Jay Buhner, American baseball player and sportscaster
- 1964 – Tom Prince, American baseball player and manager
- 1965 – Mark Lemke, American baseball player, coach, and radio host
- 1965 – Hayato Matsuo, Japanese composer and conductor
- 1966 – Scooter Barry, American basketball player
- 1966 – Shayne Corson, Canadian ice hockey player
- 1967 – Dave Jamerson, American basketball player
- 1967 – Digna Ketelaar, Dutch tennis player
- 1968 – Tal Bachman, Canadian singer-songwriter
- 1968 – Todd Hendricks, American football player and coach
- 1968 – Tony Jarrett, English sprinter and hurdler
- 1969 – Midori Ito, Japanese figure skater
- 1970 – Will Clarke, American author
- 1970 – Elvis Grbac, American football player and coach
- 1970 – Alan Shearer, English footballer and manager
- 1971 – Patrick Carpentier, Canadian race car driver
- 1971 – Adam Housley, American baseball player and journalist
- 1971 – Moritz Bleibtreu, German actor
- 1972 – Kevin Plank, American businessman, founded Under Armour
- 1973 – Molly Henneberg, American journalist
- 1973 – Eric Medlen, American race car driver (died 2007)
- 1974 – Scott MacRae, American baseball player and coach
- 1974 – Joe Perry, English snooker player
- 1974 – Niklas Sundin, Swedish musician and artist
- 1974 – Jarrod Washburn, American baseball player and coach
- 1975 – Shoaib Akhtar, Pakistani cricketer
- 1975 – Marty Turco, Canadian ice hockey player and sportscaster
- 1976 – Geno Carlisle, American basketball player
- 1976 – Nicolás Lapentti, Ecuadorian tennis player
- 1977 – Michael Klim, Polish-Australian swimmer
- 1977 – Kenyan Weaks, American basketball player and coach
- 1978 – Dwight Smith, American football player
- 1979 – Román Colón, Dominican baseball player
- 1979 – Corey Patterson, American baseball player
- 1979 – Taizō Sugimura, Japanese politician
- 1982 – Ibram X. Kendi, American author and antiracist activist
- 1982 – Christopher Raeburn, English fashion designer
- 1982 – Sarah Huckabee Sanders, Governor of Arkansas, American political consultant and press secretary
- 1983 – Dallas Braden, American baseball player
- 1983 – Aleš Hemský, Czech ice hockey player
- 1983 – Ľubomír Michalík, Slovak footballer
- 1983 – Christian Müller, German footballer
- 1984 – Alona Bondarenko, Ukrainian tennis player
- 1984 – Niko Kranjčar, Croatian footballer
- 1984 – Boone Logan, American baseball player
- 1985 – Gerrit van Look, German rugby player and coach
- 1986 – Demetrious Johnson, American mixed martial artist
- 1987 – Jose Lorenzo Diokno, Filipino director, producer, and screenwriter
- 1987 – Devin McCourty, American football player
- 1987 – Jason McCourty, American football player
- 1987 – Jamie Reed, Welsh footballer
- 1988 – Keith Benson, American basketball player
- 1988 – Jerry Hughes, American football player
- 1988 – Brandon Workman, American baseball player
- 1989 – Greg Draper, New Zealand footballer
- 1989 – Justin Greene, American basketball player
- 1989 – Israel Jiménez, Mexican footballer
- 1990 – DeMarcus Cousins, American basketball player
- 1990 – Benjamin Stambouli, French footballer
- 1991 – Dave Days, American singer-songwriter and guitarist
- 1991 – Lesley Doig, Scottish lawn bowler
- 1992 – Katrina Gorry, Australian football player
- 1992 – Lucas Moura, Brazilian footballer
- 1992 – Alicja Tchórz, Polish swimmer
- 1992 – Taijuan Walker, American baseball player
- 1993 – Johnny Gaudreau, American ice hockey player (died 2024)
- 1993 – Moses Mbye, Australian rugby league player
- 1994 – Filip Forsberg, Swedish ice hockey player
- 1996 – Antonia Lottner, German tennis player
- 1998 – Dalma Gálfi, Hungarian tennis player
- 2000 – Na Jaemin, South Korean rapper, singer, dancer and actor
- 2002 – Stella Lefty, American singer-songwriter

== Deaths ==
=== Pre-1600 ===
- 587 – Radegund, Frankish princess and saint (born 520)
- 604 – Wen, emperor of the Sui Dynasty (born 541)
- 612 – Fabia Eudokia, Byzantine empress (born 580)
- 662 – Maximus the Confessor, Byzantine theologian
- 696 – Takechi, Japanese prince
- 900 – Zwentibold, king of Lotharingia (born 870)
- 908 – Al-Muktafi, Abbasid caliph
- 981 – Gyeongjong, king of Goryeo (Korea) (born 955)
- 1134 – Irene of Hungary, Byzantine empress (born 1088)
- 1297 – Nawrūz, Mongol emir
- 1311 – Pietro Gradenigo, doge of Venice
- 1382 – Eleanor of Aragon, queen of Castile (born 1358)
- 1447 – Filippo Maria Visconti, duke of Milan (born 1392)
- 1523 – Gerard David, Flemish painter (born 1460)

=== 1601–1900 ===
- 1608 – Giambologna, Italian sculptor (born 1529)
- 1617 – Johann Jakob Grynaeus, Swiss clergyman and theologian (born 1540)
- 1667 – Jeremy Taylor, Irish bishop and saint (born 1613)
- 1686 – Louis Maimbourg, French priest and historian (born 1610)
- 1721 – Jacques Lelong, French priest and author (born 1665)
- 1744 – John Cruger, Danish-American businessman and politician, 39th Mayor of New York City (born 1678)
- 1749 – Johann Elias Schlegel, German poet and critic (born 1719)
- 1766 – Margaret Fownes-Luttrell, English painter (born 1726)
- 1795 – Ahilyabai Holkar, Queen of Indore (born 1725)
- 1826 – René Laennec, French physician, invented the stethoscope (born 1781)
- 1863 – Eugène Delacroix, French painter and lithographer (born 1798)
- 1865 – Ignaz Semmelweis, Hungarian physician and obstetrician (born 1818)
- 1900 – Collis Potter Huntington, American railway magnate (born 1821)

=== 1901–present ===
- 1910 – Florence Nightingale, Italian-English nurse and theologian (born 1820)
- 1912 – Jules Massenet, French composer (born 1842)
- 1917 – Eduard Buchner, German chemist, Nobel Prize laureate (born 1860)
- 1934 – Mary Hunter Austin, American author and playwright (born 1868)
- 1937 – Sigizmund Levanevsky, Soviet aircraft pilot of Polish origin (born 1902)
- 1946 – H. G. Wells, English novelist, historian, and critic (born 1866)
- 1954 – Demetrius Constantine Dounis, Greek violinist and mandolin player (born 1886)
- 1958 – Francis J. McCormick, American football, basketball player, and coach (born 1903)
- 1963 – Louis Bastien, French cyclist and fencer (born 1881)
- 1965 – Hayato Ikeda, Japanese lawyer and politician, 58th Prime Minister of Japan (born 1899)
- 1971 – W. O. Bentley, English race car driver and engineer, founded Bentley Motors Limited (born 1888)
- 1974 – Ida McNeil, American broadcaster and designer of the flag of South Dakota (born 1888)
- 1975 – Murilo Mendes, Brazilian poet and telegrapher (born 1901)
- 1978 – Lonnie Mayne, American wrestler (born 1944)
- 1979 – Andrew Dasburg, American painter and sculptor (born 1887)
- 1984 – Tigran Petrosian, Georgian-Armenian chess player (born 1929)
- 1986 – Helen Mack, American actress (born 1913)
- 1989 – Tim Richmond, American race car driver (born 1955)
- 1989 – Larkin I. Smith, American police officer and politician (born 1944)
- 1991 – James Roosevelt, American general and politician (born 1907)
- 1995 – Alison Hargreaves, English mountaineer (born 1963)
- 1995 – Jan Křesadlo, Czech-English psychologist and author (born 1926)
- 1995 – Mickey Mantle, American baseball player and sportscaster (born 1931)
- 1996 – António de Spínola, Portuguese general and politician, 14th President of Portugal (born 1910)
- 1998 – Nino Ferrer, Italian-French singer-songwriter and guitarist (born 1934)
- 1998 – Edward Ginzton, Ukrainian-American physicist and academic (born 1915)
- 1998 – Julien Green, American author (born 1900)
- 1998 – Rafael Robles, Dominican-American baseball player (born 1947)
- 1999 – Ignatz Bubis, German Jewish religious leader (born 1927)
- 1999 – Jaime Garzón, Colombian journalist and lawyer (born 1960)
- 2000 – Nazia Hassan, Pakistani singer-songwriter (born 1965)
- 2001 – Otto Stuppacher, Austrian race car driver (born 1947)
- 2001 – Jim Hughes, American baseball player and manager (born 1923)
- 2001 – Betty Cavanna, American author (born 1909)
- 2003 – Ed Townsend, American singer-songwriter and producer (born 1929)
- 2004 – Julia Child, American chef, author, and television host (born 1912)
- 2004 – Akku Yadav, Indian gangster and serial rapist (born 1971 or 1972)
- 2005 – Miguel Arraes, Brazilian lawyer and politician (born 1916)
- 2005 – David Lange, New Zealand lawyer and politician, 32nd Prime Minister of New Zealand (born 1942)
- 2006 – Tony Jay, English actor and singer (born 1933)
- 2006 – Jon Nödtveidt, Swedish musician (born 1975)
- 2006 – Kermit L. Hall, American legal historian and university president (born 1944)
- 2007 – Brian Adams, American wrestler (born 1964)
- 2007 – Brooke Astor, American philanthropist and socialite (born 1902)
- 2007 – Phil Rizzuto, American baseball player and sportscaster (born 1917)
- 2008 – Henri Cartan, French mathematician and academic (born 1904)
- 2008 – Bill Gwatney, American politician (born 1959)
- 2008 – Jack Weil, American businessman (born 1901)
- 2009 – Lavelle Felton, American basketball player (born 1980)
- 2010 – Panagiotis Bachramis, Greek footballer (born 1976)
- 2010 – Lance Cade, American wrestler (born 1981)
- 2010 – Edwin Newman, American journalist and author (born 1919)
- 2011 – Tareque Masud, Bangladeshi director, producer, and screenwriter (born 1957)
- 2011 – Mishuk Munier, Bangladeshi journalist and cinematographer (born 1959)
- 2012 – Hugo Adam Bedau, American philosopher and academic (born 1926)
- 2012 – Helen Gurley Brown, American journalist and author (born 1922)
- 2012 – Ray Jordon, Australian cricketer and coach (born 1937)
- 2012 – Johnny Pesky, American baseball player and manager (born 1919)
- 2012 – Joan Roberts, American actress and singer (born 1917)
- 2013 – Lothar Bisky, German politician (born 1941)
- 2013 – Aaron Selber, Jr., American businessman and philanthropist (born 1927)
- 2013 – Jean Vincent, French footballer and manager (born 1930)
- 2014 – Frans Brüggen, Dutch flute player and conductor (born 1934)
- 2014 – Eduardo Campos, Brazilian politician, 14th Brazilian Minister of Science and Technology (born 1965)
- 2014 – Martino Finotto, Italian race car driver (born 1933)
- 2014 – Süleyman Seba, Turkish footballer and manager (born 1926)
- 2015 – Watban Ibrahim al-Tikriti, Iraqi politician, Iraqi Minister of Interior (born 1952)
- 2015 – Bob Fillion, Canadian ice hockey player and manager (born 1920)
- 2015 – Om Prakash Munjal, Indian businessman and philanthropist, co-founded Hero Cycles (born 1928)
- 2016 – Kenny Baker, English actor and musician (born 1934)
- 2016 – Pramukh Swami Maharaj, Indian Hindu leader (born 1921)
- 2018 – Jim Neidhart, American wrestler (born 1955)
- 2021 – Nanci Griffith, American singer-songwriter (born 1953)
- 2024 – Richard Alatorre, American politician (born 1943)
- 2024 – Wally Amos, American entrepreneur, founder of Famous Amos (born 1936)
- 2024 – Sergio Donati, Italian screenwriter (born 1933)
- 2024 – Greg Kihn, American singer-songwriter and guitarist (born 1949)
- 2024 – Frank Selvy, American basketball player and coach (born 1932)
- 2026 – Prichard Colón, Puerto Rican boxer (born 1992)

== Holidays and observances ==
- Christian feast day:
  - Benedetto Sinigardi
  - Benildus Romançon
  - Cassian of Imola
  - Clara Maass (Lutheran Church)
  - Florence Nightingale, Octavia Hill (Lutheran Church)
  - Blessed Gertrude of Aldenberg
  - Hippolytus of Rome
  - Blessed Jakob Gapp
  - Jeremy Taylor (Anglican Communion)
  - John Berchmans
  - Junian of Mairé
  - Blessed Marco d'Aviano
  - Maximus the Confessor
  - Nerses Glaietsi (Catholic Church)
  - Pope Pontian
  - Radegunde
  - Wigbert
  - August 13 (Eastern Orthodox liturgics)
- Independence Day, celebrates the independence of Central African Republic from France in 1960.
- International Lefthanders Day (International)
- Women's Day, commemorates the enaction of Tunisian Code of Personal Status in 1956. (Tunisia)
- World Organ Donation Day
