= A Coruña (comarca) =

Coordinates: 43.3°N 8.36667°W

- Comarca
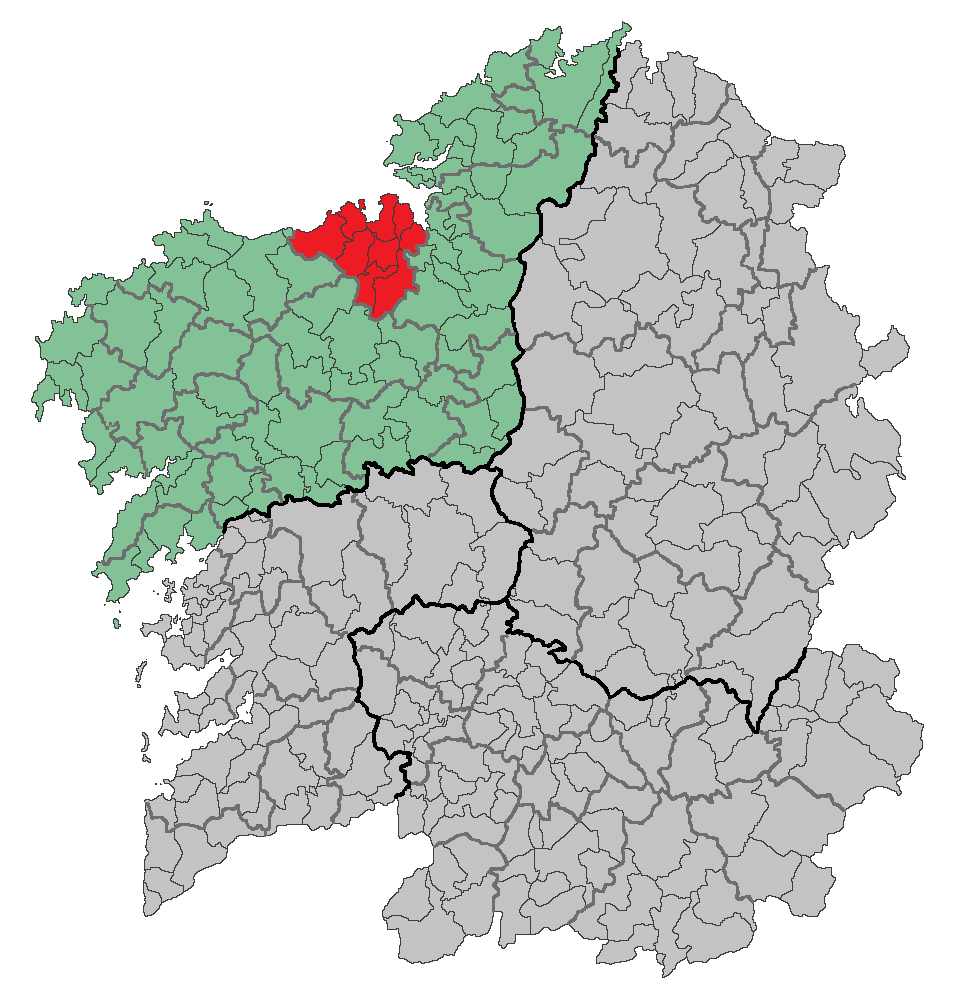
- Country: Spain
- Autonomous community: Galicia
- Province: A Coruña
- Capital: A Coruña
- Municipalities: List: Abegondo, Arteixo, Bergondo, Cambre, Carral, A Coruña, Culleredo, Oleiros, Sada

Area
  - Total: 470 km^{2} (180 sq mi)

Population (2019)
  - Total: 403,386
  - Density: 860/km^{2} (2,200/sq mi)
- Time zone: UTC+1 (CET)
  - Summer (DST): UTC+2 (CEST)

A Coruña is a comarca in the Galician Province of A Coruña. The overall population of this local region is 403,386 (2019).

== Municipalities ==
Abegondo, Arteixo, Bergondo, Cambre, Carral, A Coruña, Culleredo, Oleiros and Sada.
