= Paseiro =

Spanish footballer

Personal information
- Full name: José Fernández Sánchez
- Date of birth: 20 October 1928
- Place of birth: Sada, Spain
- Date of death: 4 December 2020 (aged 92)
- Place of death: A Coruña, Spain
- Height: 1.75 m (5 ft 9 in)
- Position: Striker

Youth career
- Arrancapinos
- Rayo Sadense

Senior career*
Years	Team	Apps	(Gls)
1946–1951	Deportivo La Coruña	33	(23)
1949–1950	→ Ferrol (loan)	29	(15)
1950–1951	→ Lucense (loan)	9	(2)
1951–1952	Universidad de Chile	41	(22)
1953–1956	Español	29	(14)
1955–1956	→ Gerona (loan)	–	(–)
1956–1957	Real Jaén	24	(5)
1957–1958	Xerez	3	(0)
- * Club domestic league appearances and goals

José Fernández Sánchez (20 October 1928 – 4 December 2020), known as Paseiro, was a Spanish professional footballer who played as a striker for club in his homeland and Chile.

== Career ==
Born in Sada, Galicia, Spain, Paseiro was with clubs Arrancapinos and Rayo Sadense before joining Deportivo La Coruña in 1946. In Galicia, he also played on loan for Ferrol and Lucense.

In 1951, Paseiro moved to Chile alongside his coach in Deportivo La Coruña, Alejandro Scopelli, and spent almost two years with Universidad de Chile in the Chilean Primera División.

Back to Spain, Paseiro played for Español until 1956, with a stint on loan with Gerona CF in the 1955–56 Tercera División. With Español, he won the Copa Duward twice in 1952–53 and 1953–54.

He ended his career with Real Jaén (1956–57) and Xerez (1957–58).

== Death ==
Paseiro died in A Coruña, Spain, on 4 December 2020, aged 92.
