= Oleiros, Galicia =

Oleiros
- Municipality
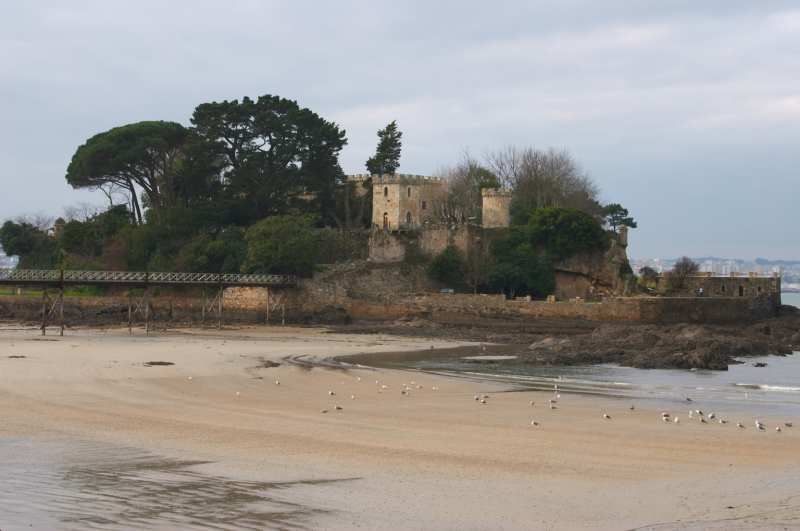
- Castle of Santa Cruz.

- Flag Coat of arms
- Location of Oleiros
- Coordinates: 43.3333°N 8.3166°W
- Region: Galicia
- Province: A Coruña
- Comarca: A Coruña
- Parishes: Dexo, Dorneda, Iñás, Liáns, Maianca, Nos, Oleiros, Perillo & Serantes

Government
  - Alcalde (Mayor): Ángel García Seoane (AV)

Area
  - Total: 43.87 km^{2} (16.94 sq mi)

Population (2025-01-01)
  - Total: 38,793
  - Density: 884.3/km^{2} (2,290/sq mi)
- Time zone: UTC+1 (CET)
  - Summer (DST): UTC+2 (CEST)
- Website: http://www.oleiros.org

Oleiros (Spanish and Galician: [oˈlejɾos]) is a municipality of northwestern Spain in the province of A Coruña, in the autonomous community of Galicia. The whole municipality is basically a residential area and the vast majority of its residents commute on a daily basis to the neighbor city of A Coruña. Oleiros is the wealthiest municipality in Galicia, it enjoys very high living standards and is notably famous for its public gardens and for a very careful urban planning. The population is more dense in the four major urban areas of Oleiros: Santa Cristina-Perillo, Santa Cruz, Oleiros and Mera. The wealthiest inhabitants of Oleiros usually live in suburbs outside these urban areas. Many of these suburbs are composed of terraced or semidetached houses. Some rural areas still exist all across the municipality.

== Geography ==
Limits at north with the Ria of Betanzos, at east with Sada and Bergondo municipalities, at south with Cambre and Culleredo municipalities and at west with A Coruña municipality and O Burgo Estuary.

== Demography ==
From:INE Archiv

== Notable natives ==
- Victor Moscoso (born 1936), graphic artist

== See also ==
List of municipalities in A Coruña
