= Abegondo =

- Municipality
- Concello de Abegondo
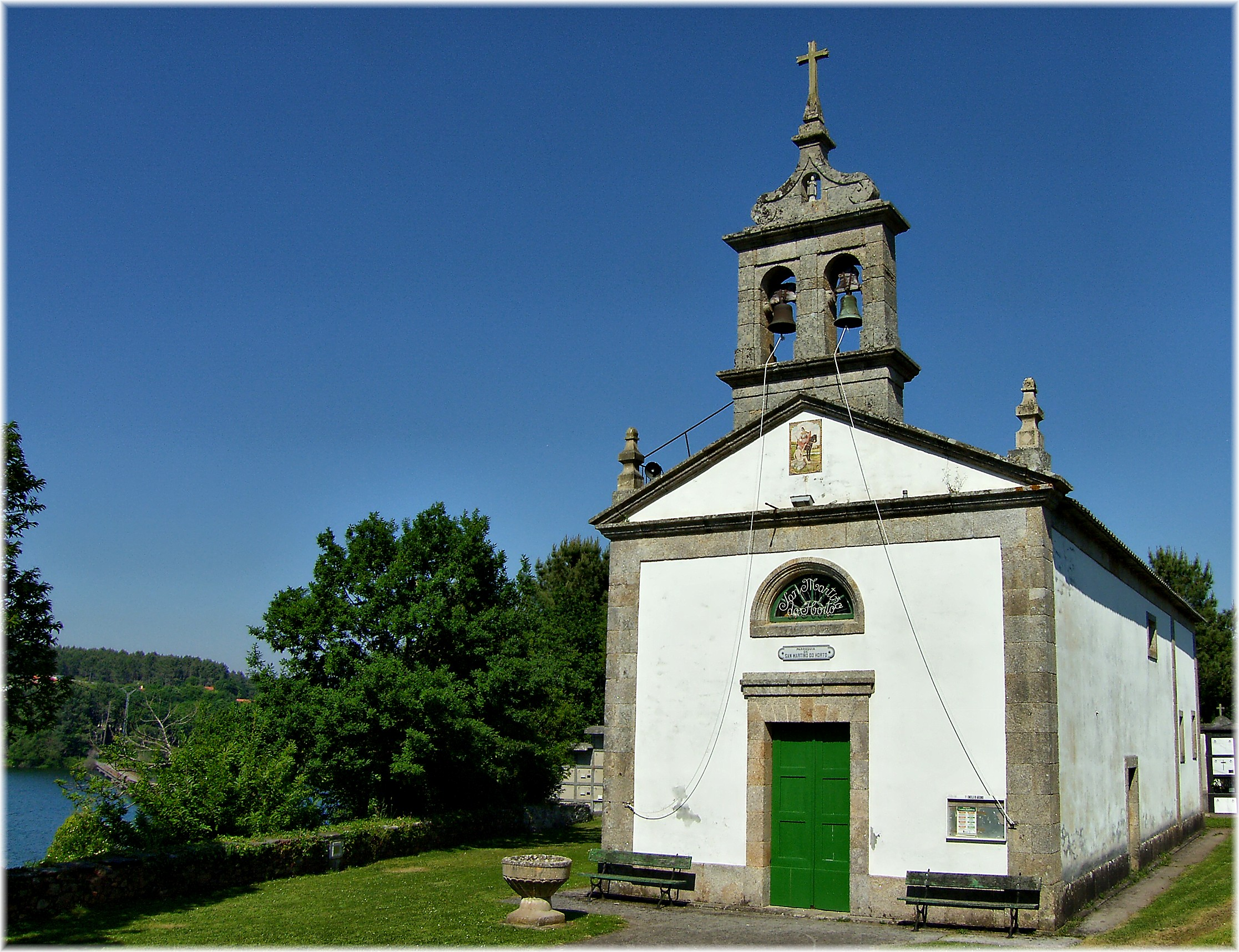

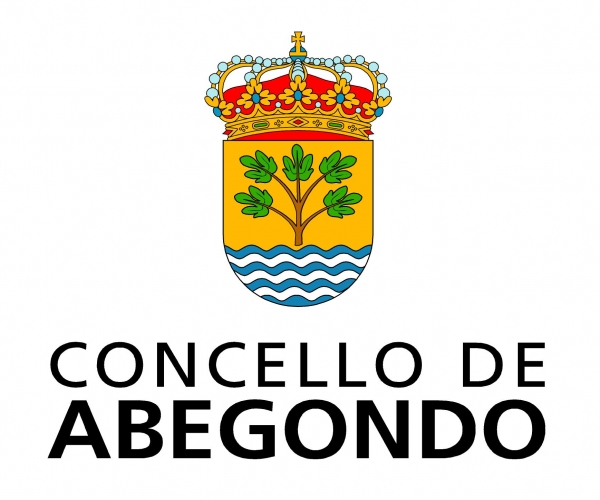
- Seal Coat of arms

- Location in the Province of A Coruña
- Coordinates: 43°12′24″N 8°18′36″W
- Country: Spain
- Community: Galicia
- Province: A Coruña
- Comarca: A Coruña

Government
  - (Alcalde) Mayor: José Antonio Santiso Miramontes (PP)

Area
  - Total: 83.81 km^{2} (32.36 sq mi)
- Elevation: 700 m (2,300 ft)

Population (2024)
  - Total: 5,578
  - Density: 66.56/km^{2} (172.4/sq mi)
- Time zone: UTC+1 (CET)
  - Summer (DST): UTC+2 (CEST)
- Postal code: 15318
- Website: www.abegondo.es

Abegondo is a municipality in the province of A Coruña, in the autonomous community of Galicia, Spain. It has an area of 83.72 km^{2} (32.32 sq mi), a population of 5,578 (2024 estimate) and a population density of 66.56 people/km^{2} (177.35 people/sq mi). It is part of the semi-coast region between the municipality of Cambre and the historic town of Betanzos.

== Geography ==
Abegondo is located 23 km southeastward of the provincial capital. The municipality consists of 19 parishes of which San Marcos, a place in Abegondo parish, is the capital.

=== Hydrography ===
Abegondo is bordered by the rivers Mero and Barcés, and the Gobia runs through it. It has two dams: Cecebre and Beche, the former is shared by the municipalities of Betanzos, Carral and Cambre.

== Demography ==
Historical population
Year	Pop.	±%
1900	7,376	—
1930	8,238	+11.7%
1950	8,202	−0.4%
1981	6,274	−23.5%
2004	5,732	−8.6%
2024	5,578	−2.7%

== Parroquias ==
- Abegondo (Santaia)
- Cabanas (San Xián)
- Cerneda (San Salvador)
- Cos (Santo Estevo)
- Crendes (San Pedro)
- Cullergondo (Santa María)
- Figueroa (San Miguel)
- Folgoso (Santa Dorotea)
- Leiro (Santaia)
- Limiñón (San Salvador)
- Mabegondo (San Tirso)
- Meangos (Santiago)
- Montouto (Santa Cristina)
- Orto (San Martiño)
- Presedo (Santa María)
- Sarandós (Santa María)
- Vilacova (San Tomé)
- Viós (San Salvador)
- Vizoño (San Pedro)

== Notable landmark ==
=== Cidade Deportiva de Abegondo ===
Located in the municipality is the Cidade Deportiva de Abegondo (also known as "El Mundo del Futbol", which is Spanish for "The World of Football"), that serves as the home stadium for Deportivo Fabril and Deportivo de A Coruña Femenino. It is also the training ground of the men's club Deportivo de A Coruña. It was opened in 2003.

The stadium facilities are the central stadium with a capacity of 1,000 seats, 6 grass pitches, 1 fieldturf pitch, 6 seven-a-side pitches and a service building with gymnasium.

=== Archaeological monuments ===
Abegondo has been continuously inhabited since the Neolithic, with various tumuli and Celtic castros spread throughout the municipality, totaling around 20 sites, including remains of Via XX.

=== Architectural landmarks ===
- Beldoña Castle. Protected by a 1949 law. Later declared Bien de Interés Cultural en 1985 and 1995.
- Pazos. Abegondo, like all other concellos in Galicia, has a considerable amount of pazos; around 10, with gothic, baroque, rococo and modern styles present.

== See also ==
- List of municipalities in A Coruña
