= SD Sporting Sada =

Spanish football club

Sporting Sada
- Full name: Sociedad Deportiva Sporting Sada
- Founded: 1951
- Dissolved: 2019
- Ground: Campo As Mariñas, Sada, Galicia, Spain
- Capacity: 1,000
- Chairman: Carlos Montes "Mimí"
- Manager: Manuel Losada González "Chollas"
- 2018–19: Primeira Galicia – Group 1, 10th of 18
Home colours	Away colours

Sociedad Deportiva Sporting Sada was a football team based in Sada in the autonomous community of Galicia. Founded in 1951, it last played in the Primeira Galicia – Group 1. Its stadium is Campo de Fútbol As Mariñas with a capacity of 1,000 seats.

Sporting Sada was dissolved in July 2019, after merging with Rayo Sadense to create Sada CF.

In New York City an amateur team playing in the Metropolitan Soccer League was another Sada F. C. composed mainly of young Spaniard immigrants. The present owner/manager of our Valencia team learned to play on this team.

== Season to season ==
Season	Tier	Division	Place	Copa del Rey
1970–71	5	1ª Reg.	2nd	
1971–72	5	1ª Reg.	4th	
1972–73	5	1ª Reg.	5th	
1973–74	5	1ª Reg.	6th	
1974–75	5	1ª Reg.	9th	
1975–76	5	1ª Reg.	2nd	
1976–77	5	1ª Reg.	1st	
1977–78	6	1ª Reg.	1st	
1978–79	6	1ª Reg.	1st	
1979–80	6	1ª Reg.	3rd	
1980–81	6	1ª Reg.	1st	
1981–82	5	Reg. Pref.	12th	
1982–83	5	Reg. Pref.	12th	
1983–84	5	Reg. Pref.	4th	
1984–85	5	Reg. Pref.	2nd	
1985–86	5	Reg. Pref.	2nd	
1986–87	5	Reg. Pref.	5th	
1987–88	4	3ª	16th	
1988–89	4	3ª	18th	
1989–90	5	Reg. Pref.	1st	

Season	Tier	Division	Place	Copa del Rey
1990–91	4	3ª	19th	
1991–92	5	Reg. Pref.	12th	
1992–93	5	Reg. Pref.	15th	
1993–94	5	Reg. Pref.	14th	
1994–95	5	Reg. Pref.	13th	
1995–96	5	Reg. Pref.	15th	
1996–97	5	Reg. Pref.	11th	
1997–98	5	Reg. Pref.	4th	
1998–99	5	Reg. Pref.	5th	
1999–2000	5	Reg. Pref.	5th	
2000–01	5	Reg. Pref.	12th	
2001–02	5	Reg. Pref.	12th	
2002–03	5	Reg. Pref.	14th	
2003–04	5	Reg. Pref.	10th	
2004–05	5	Reg. Pref.	17th	
2005–06	5	Reg. Pref.	5th	
2006–07	5	Pref. Aut.	14th	
2007–08	5	Pref. Aut.	15th	
2008–09	5	Pref. Aut.	13th	
2009–10	5	Pref. Aut.	18th	

Season	Tier	Division	Place	Copa del Rey
2010–11	6	1ª Aut.	4th	
2011–12	6	1ª Aut.	2nd	
2012–13	5	Pref. Aut.	11th	
2013–14	5	Pref. Aut.	7th	
2014–15	5	Pref. Aut.	6th	
2015–16	5	Pref.	7th	
2016–17	5	Pref.	20th	
2017–18	6	1ª Gal.	14th	
2018–19	6	1ª Gal.	10th	

- 3 seasons in Tercera División
