= Church of Santa María de Cambre =

Church in Cambre, Galicia, Spain

Church of Santa María, Cambre
- Igrexa de Santa María de Cambre; Iglesia de Santa María de Cambre
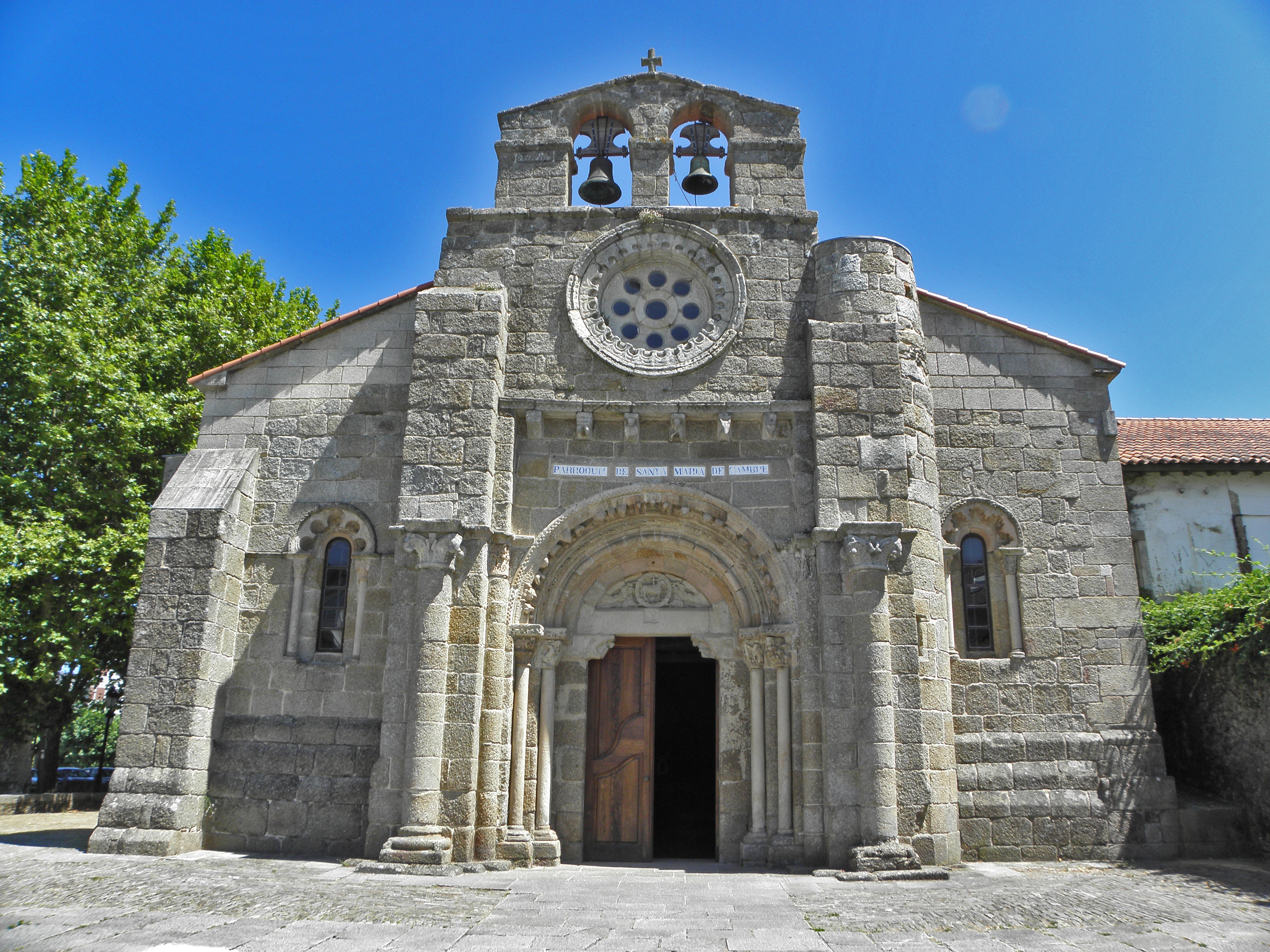
- Main facade

Religion
- Affiliation: Catholic Church
- Patron: Mary, mother of Jesus

Location
- Location: Cambre, A Coruña, Galicia
- Country: Spain
- Interactive map of Church of Santa María, Cambre
- Coordinates: 43.2920228°N 8.3442262°W

Architecture
- Spanish Cultural Heritage
- Designated: June 3, 1931
- Reference no.: RI-51-0000541

The Church of Santa María, Cambre (Galician: Igrexa de Santa María de Cambre; Spanish: Iglesia de Santa María de Cambre), is a 12th-century Romanesque church in Cambre, Galicia, Spain. It follows the style of Compostela and is one of the outstanding churches in Galician Romanesque architecture.

It was declared a Bien de Interés Cultural in 1998.

== History ==
During the Early Middle Ages, it was founded as a private family monastery by the knight Alvito and his sisters Vestriberga and Urraca. The first abbot was Adulfo. In 932 it was given to the Benedictine Abbey of San Paio, which after initially maintaining it as an abbey reduced it in status to a priory.

In 1489 Cambre Priory was incorporated, along with the monastery of San Paio, into the Abbey of San Martiño Pinario, which belonged to the reformist Benedictine Congregation of San Benito el Real in Valladolid. In 1589 it was burnt down by English pirates, and rebuilt at the expense of San Martiño Pinario. It was badly damaged again by the French during the Peninsular War. It was suppressed in 1835 during the ecclesiastical confiscations of Mendizábal.

Of the monastery buildings only the church survives.

== Stages ==
The construction of the church can be divided into three stages

=== First stage ===
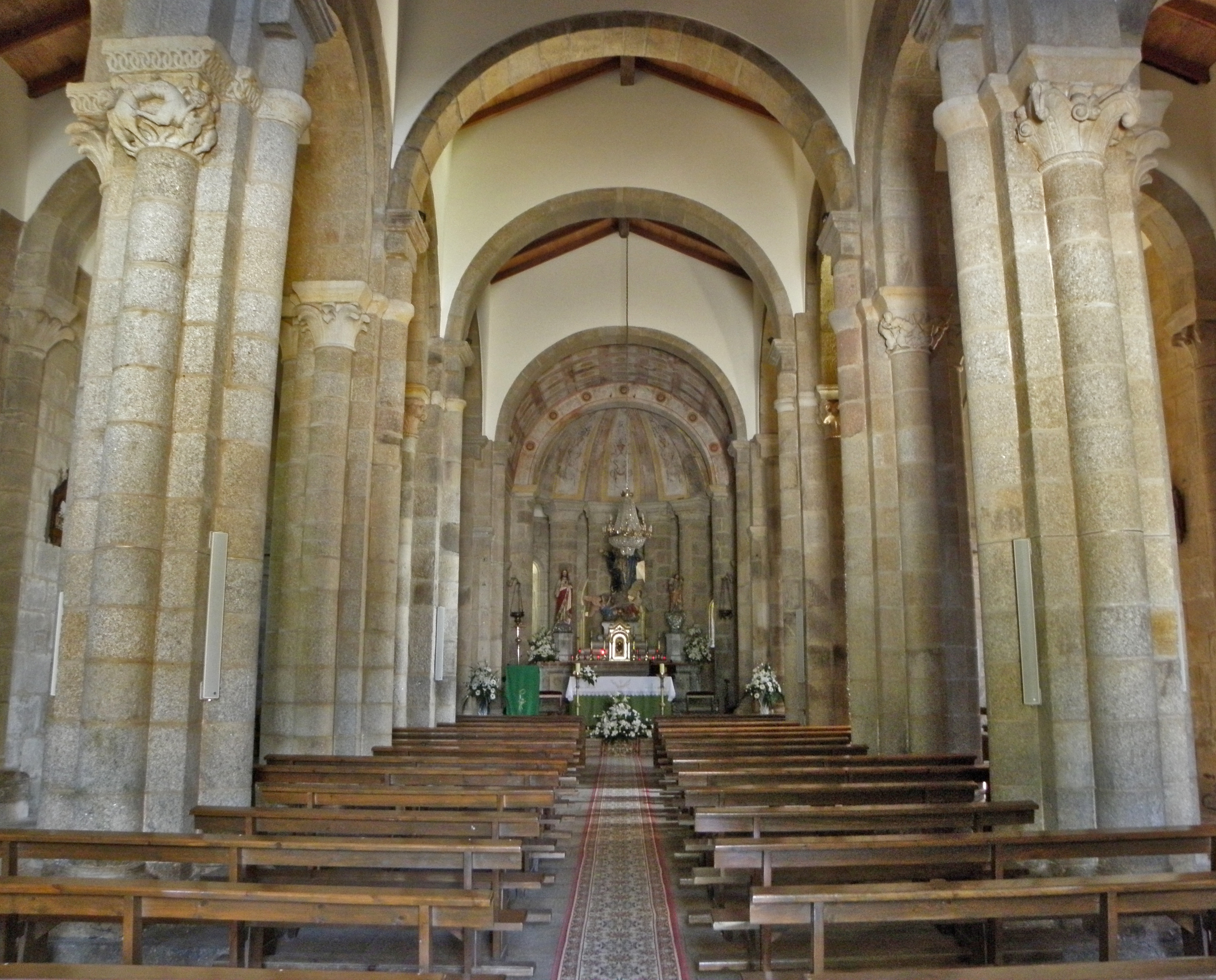
The central nave with the main chapel in the middle

There in the middle of the 12th century the main façade, the first three trams of the longitudinal naves where built, with the central nave being the longest one and separated from the lateral ones by squared piers with semicolumns stuck to the sides. The transverse and arched arches, on which the wooden roof is supported, are semicircular and start from capitals with generally vegetal decoration.

=== Second stage ===
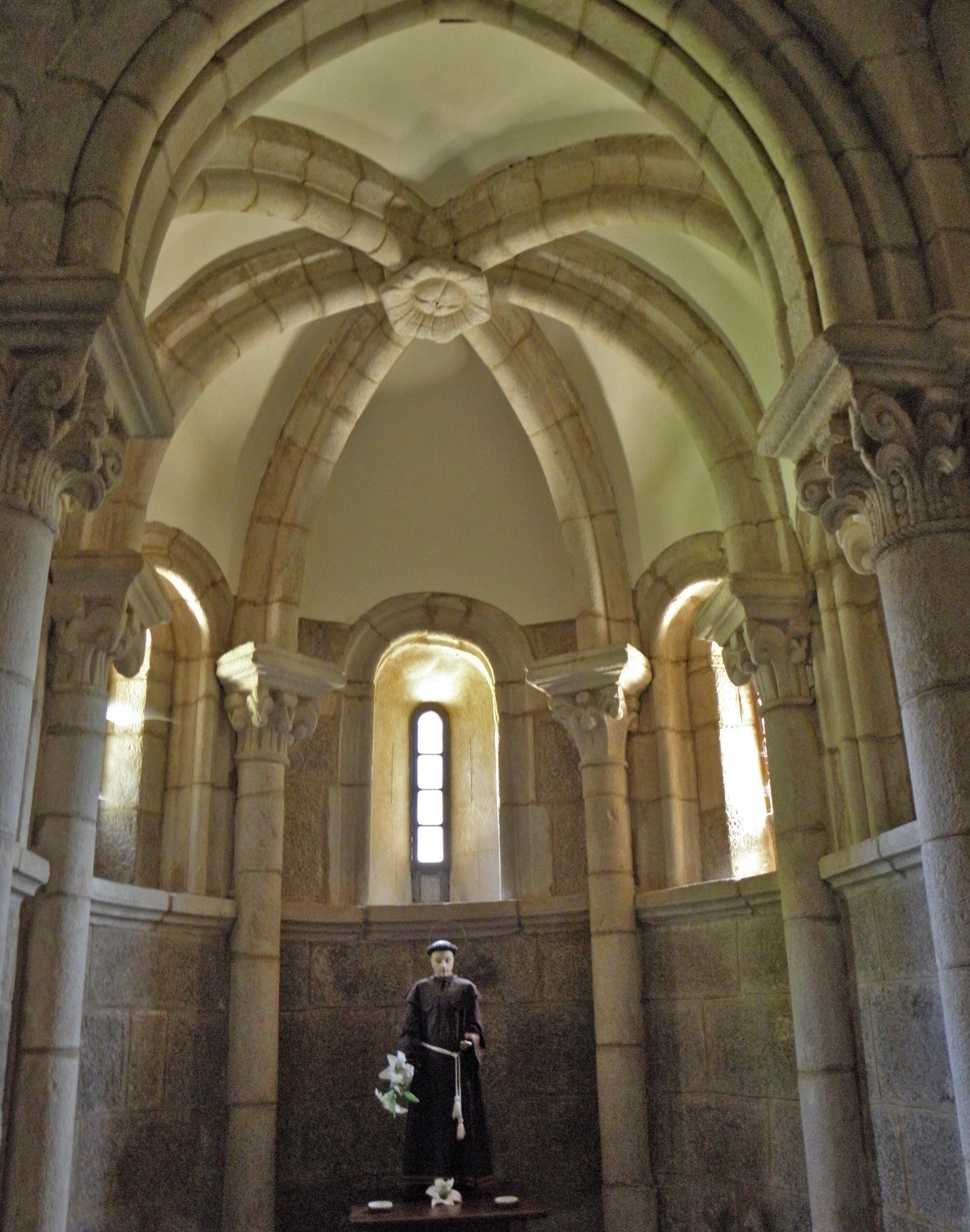
Arch with a Groin vault

It shows clear influences from the cathedral of Santiago de Compostela in its crown with five radial chapels, which makes it related, despite its size, to the great pilgrimage churches. The radial chapels open to the crown by ogival arches, supported by semi-columns attached to the walls, and are covered with ribbed vaults.

=== Third stage ===
It corresponds to the 13th century, in which the apse, the transept, the last section of the naves and the portal were completed. The crown is covered with an annular vault and the main chapel, composed of a rectangular section and another semicircular, with a barrel vault topped with a quarter sphere. Some cosco stairs on the east side of the smaller arms of the transept give access to what were probably once two small towers that do not protrude from the roof today.

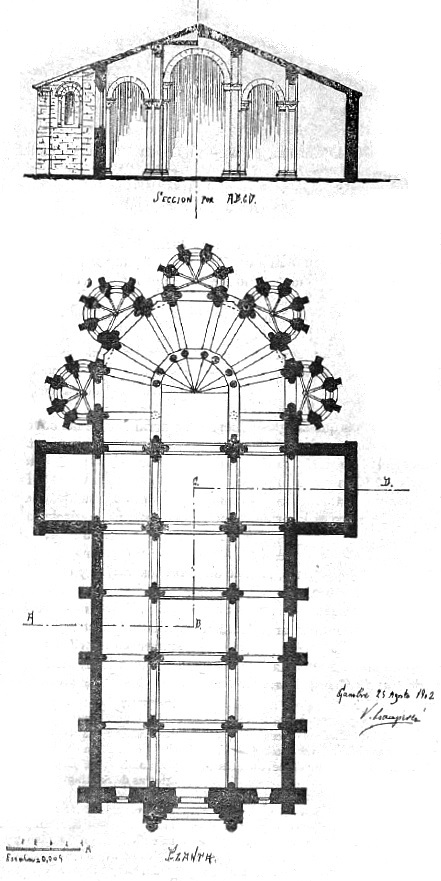
Cross section of the church made in August 25 of 1902

== Description ==
Inside it preserves some pieces of interest: a capital with the date 1194 engraved on it, a sink known as the Hydria of Jerusalem, which is according to tradition was one of the hydrias used by Jesus to turn water to wine, or a Virgin and Child in stone from the end of the 12th century.

== Bibliography ==
- Vila da Vila, Margarita: La iglesia románica de Cambre (1986). Concello de Cambre.
- Delgado Gómez, Jaime: El Cordero Místico del tímpano de Santa María de Cambre (1984). Revista Brigantium.
- Sastre Vázquez, Carlos: Mirando a Jerusalén desde Santa María de Cambre (2010). Anuario Brigantino.
