= Carral =

Municipality in Galicia, Spain

Concello de Carral
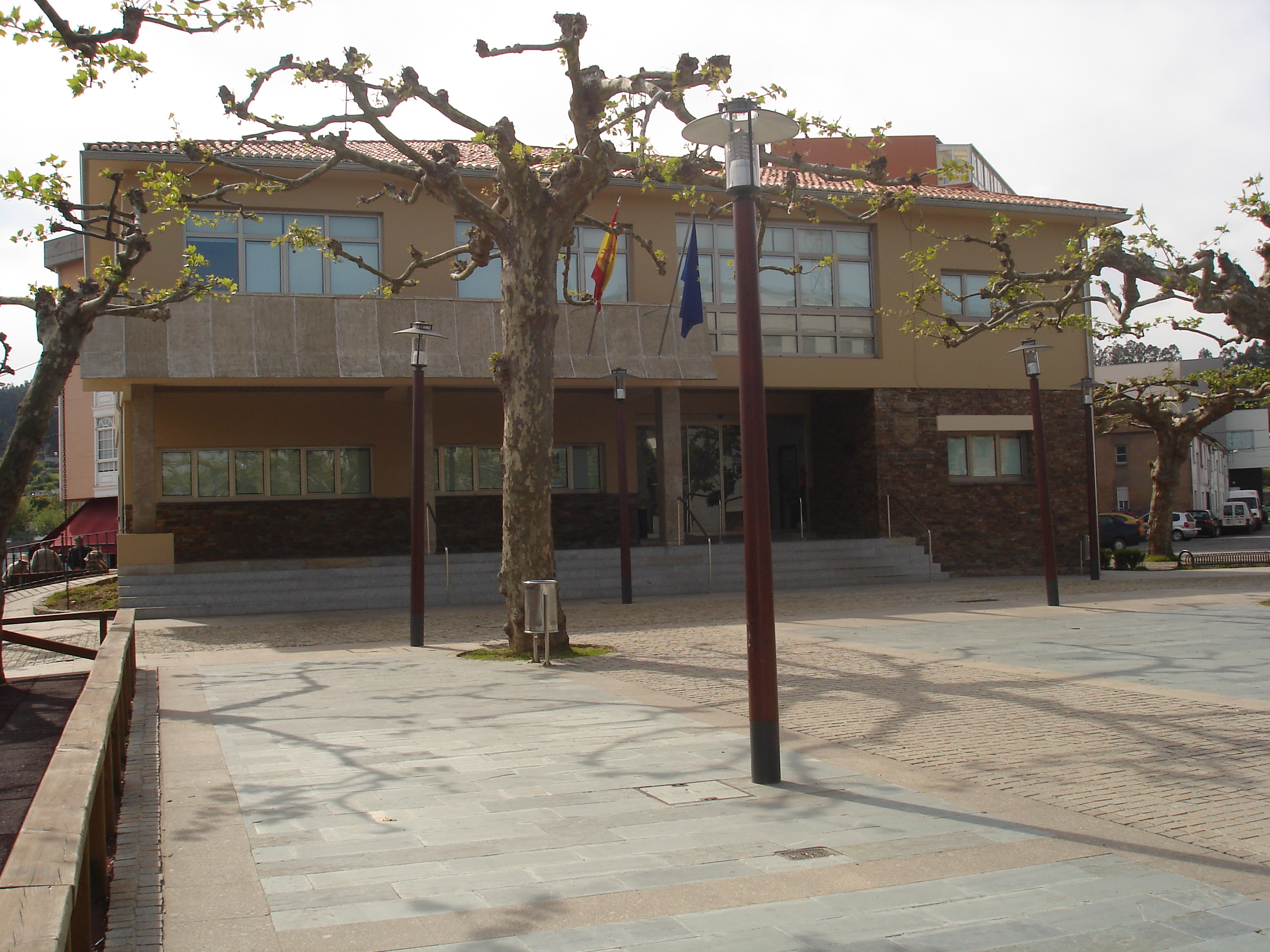

- Coat of arms

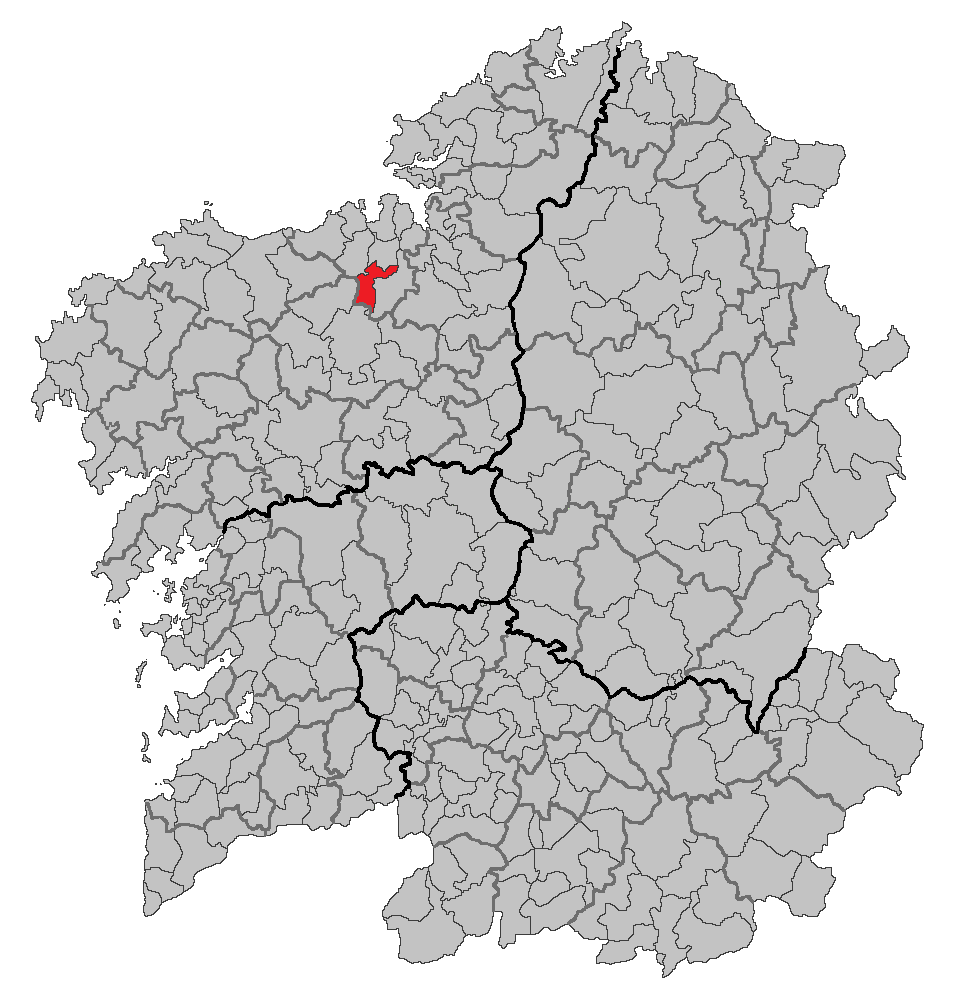
- Situation of Carral within Galicia
- Coordinates: 43°22′59″N 8°35′57″W
- Parroquias: Beira, Cañás, Paleo, Quembre, Sergude, Sumio, Tabeaio & Vigo

Population (2025-01-01)
  - Total: 6,840
- Time zone: UTC+1 (CET)
  - Summer (DST): UTC+2 (CEST)

Carral is a municipality of northwestern Spain in the province of A Coruña, in the autonomous community of Galicia. It is located 17 kilometers from the provincial capital of A Coruña. It has an area of 48 km^{2}, a population of 6,581 (2021) and a population density of 113.6 people/km^{2}.

It borders with the municipalities of Ordes, Abegondo, Cambre, Cerceda and Culleredo.

== History ==
In 2001, Ubaldo Núñez Rivas, a famous clarinetist who had settled in the city, died there. In 2021, the municipality was the home of 6,581 people, a number that grew from 5,236 in 2001.

== See also ==
- List of municipalities in A Coruña
