= Cambre =

Coordinates: 43.283°N 8.333°W

Concello de Cambre
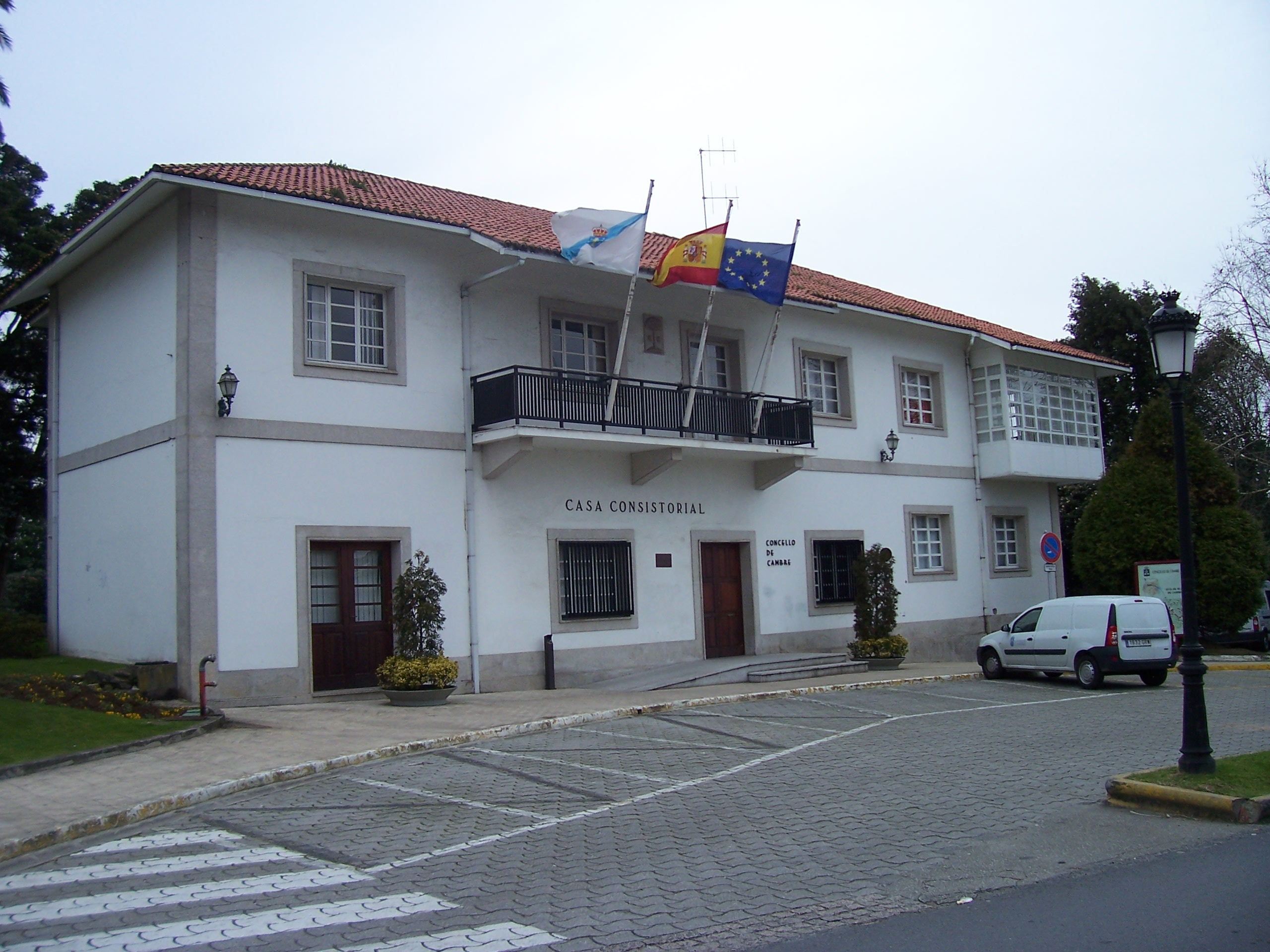

- Flag Coat of arms
- Nickname: Cambre
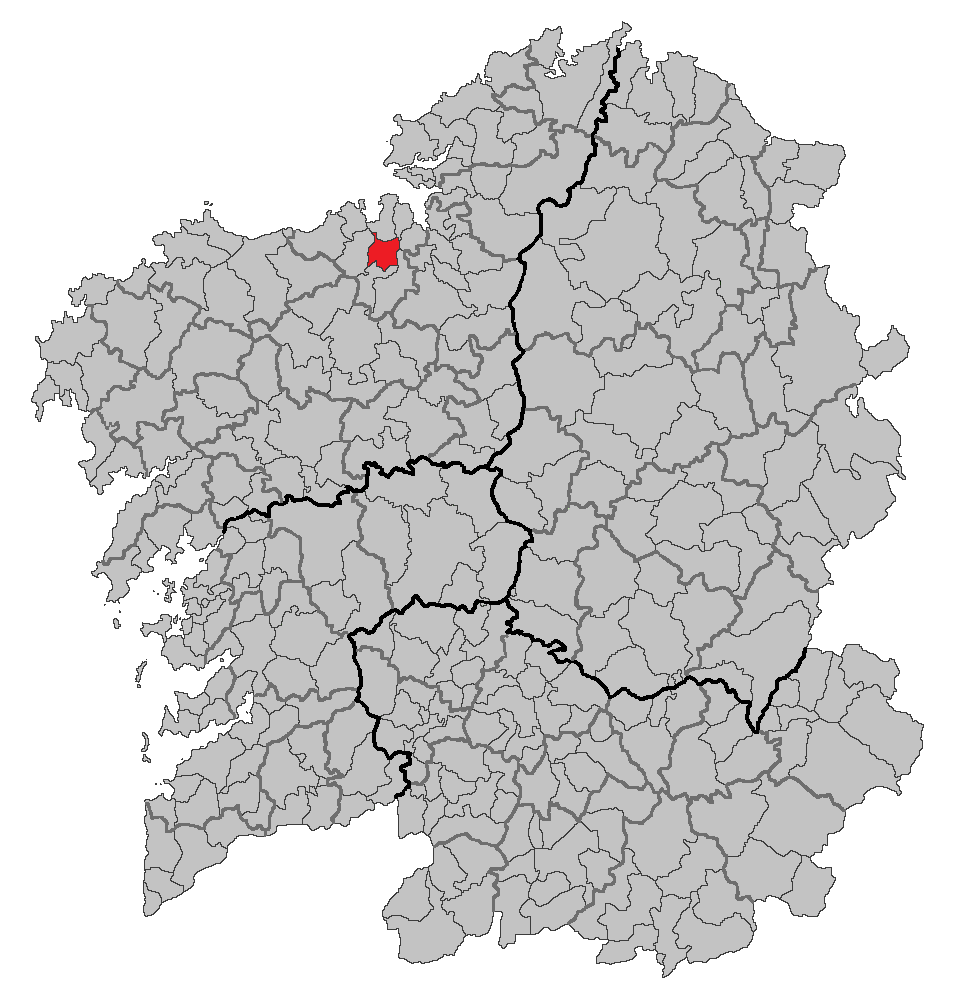
- Location of Cambre within Galicia
- Parroquias: Anceis, Andeiro, Brexo, Bribes, Cambre, Cecebre, Cela, Meixigo, Pravio, Sigrás, O Temple & Vigo

Government
  - Alcalde (Mayor): Diana Piñeiro [PP (Partido Popular)]

Area
  - Total: 41 km^{2} (16 sq mi)

Population (2025-01-01)
  - Total: 24,765
  - Density: 600/km^{2} (1,600/sq mi)
- Time zone: UTC+1 (CET)
  - Summer (DST): UTC+2 (CEST)
- Website: http://www.cambre.org/

Cambre is a municipality in the Province of A Coruña, in the autonomous community of Galicia in northwestern Spain. It is located 12 km from the capital city of A Coruña and ten minutes away from the city's airport, Alvedro.

According to the 2010 census, the municipality of Cambre includes 23,621 inhabitants spread over its 12 parishes, which occupy 41 square kilometres. The parishes are those of O Temple, Cambre, Sigrás, Anceis, San Lorenzo, Cela, Andeiro, Santa María de Vigo, Bribes, Brexo-Lema, Cecebre and Pravio. It shares municipal boundaries with the neighbouring municipalities of Culleredo, Carral and Oleiros.

The town of Cambre has many sites of interest. Among them are:

The Church of Our Lady Mary of Cambre (Spanish: Iglesia de Santa María de Cambre, Galician: Igrexa de Santa María de Cambre), built around the 12th century; an archaeological museum with a permanent exhibition of the remains of a Roman bathroom and latrine; and the house of Galician writer Wenceslao Fernández Flórez (1885–1964).

The town is located on the Way of St. James (Camino de Santiago), though on the English Way (Camino inglés), used mainly by pilgrims coming from England and Ireland via ship to A Coruña or Ferrol, and from there on foot to Santiago de Compostela.

== Name ==
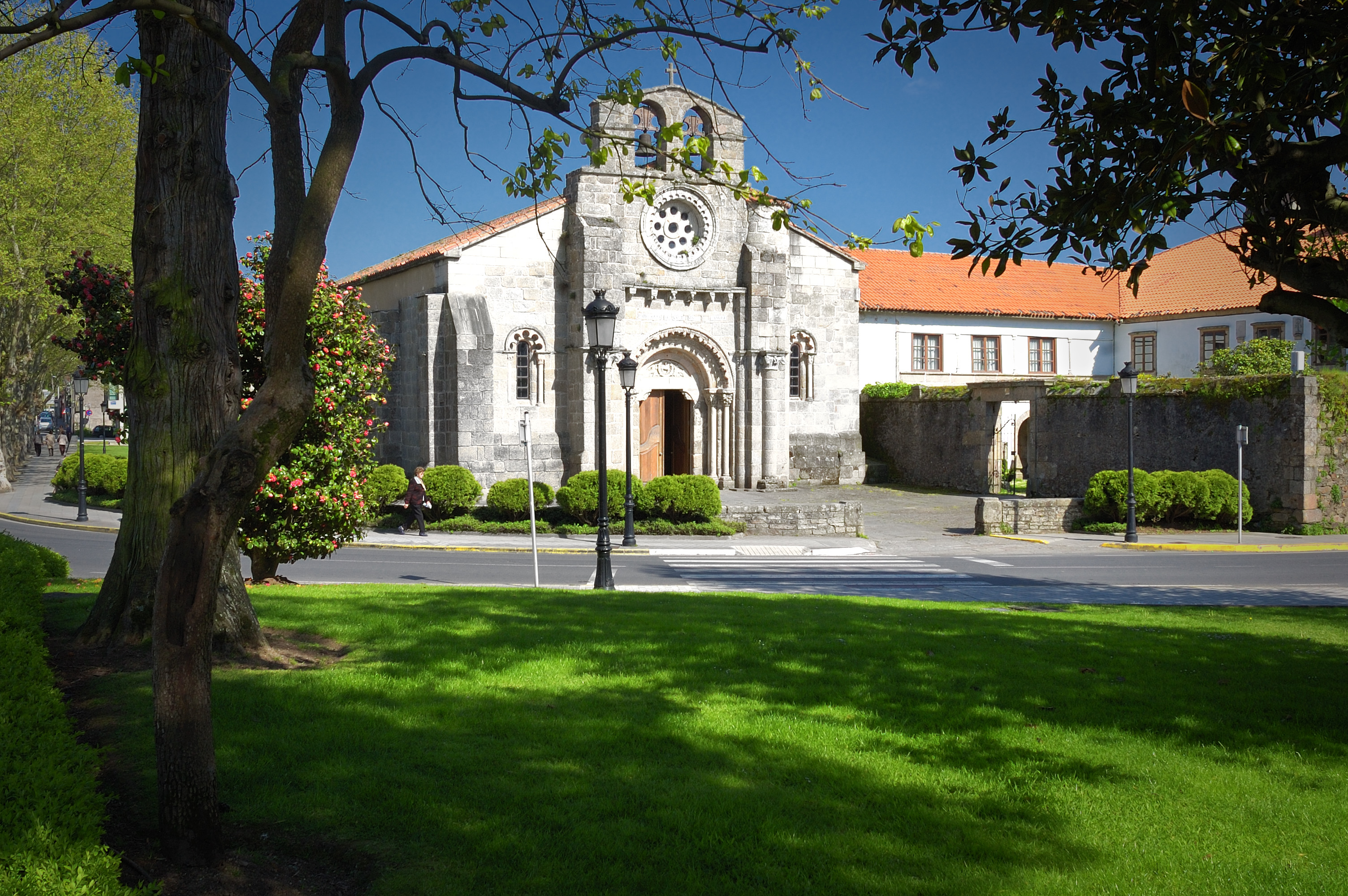
Our Lady Mary of Cambre

Cambre's name is considered to derive from "Calambre" or "Calamber", according to different sources. It is first mentioned during the construction of the Church of Santa María (12th century). The name was very possibly given to the area by Knights Templar, a Christian order created in the aftermath of the First Crusade of 1096. The Order ceased to exist two centuries later, but after they had built a fortress near the town's centre which has since ceased to exist. One of Cambre's parishes is called Temple in their honour.

However, there are other theories which give a different origin to Cambre's name. Carré Aldao suggests its name derives from "Cambria", which sounds relatively similar to Cymru (Wales). If this were true, it might suggest an early invasion of the region by Welsh vikings several centuries ago, though it may well be a semilegendary hypothesis derived from a romantic view of history to link the Celtic people with those of Galicia. Nevertheless, this theory might be supported by the fact that when the Romans arrived to the Northwestern region of the Iberian Peninsula (present day Galicia and Northern Portugal), they named the area Galicia, as they recognized the ethnic group that populated the region as different from the rest of the peninsula. The Latin derived terms Galicia or Galegos, derive from Gales, which in the majority of languages evolved from Latin translates to Wales.

== History ==
The area of Cambre was already inhabited by members of the Castro culture, as indicated by the presence of several castros. However, Cambre's castros are not very well preserved and show but certain parts of these ancient constructions, such as defensive walls and pits. The Castro of Sigrás is the most impressive.

Roman remains throughout the area imply Cambre was located on the (Roman road) or via that connected Pharum (present day A Coruña) with Brigantium (Betanzos). Following the collapse of the Roman Empire and repeated invasions from barbarian tribes from the north, the area came under Suebi protection. However, Roman culture still prevailed, and Suebi influence is only present today in a few names of towns and parishes.

Shortly thereafter, the coastal areas of the province suffered major attacks from the Normans and later by conquering Muslims from the south who sacked the growing town. Cambre's splendour was triggered off thanks to the intervention of Knights Templar around the 12th century. One of Cambre's parishes called El Temple has a Romanic church dating from this period and a 14th-century bridge, which suggest great economic and social development in the area.

Following the devastating invasions and battles which took place in nearby A Coruña, most of the population moved inland, along the estuary of the River Mero, to a small village called "Burga do Faro" (today O Burgo). Cambre's splendour developed thanks to the aide of three Kings closely linked with Galicia, namely Alfonso VII, Ferdinand II and Alfonso IX, all of them educated by members of the Galician nobility. It was thanks to these three monarchs that a great number of churches were erected in the region and also several bridges throughout the area were built in a short span of time.

In the following centuries Cambre's fortune was similar to most Galician towns. Galicia was merged into the Crown of Castile and only saw a revival of its culture during the 19th century. This cultural development was frozen during the dictatorship of General Francisco Franco, but in recent years has been visited by millions of tourists, mostly visiting Santiago de Compostela.

== Pazos ==
Among Cambre's beauties, one can count its Pazos (country estates of the ancient nobility). Among them, those of San Xiao de Cela, San Paio de Brexo, San Martiño de Andeiro or San Xoán de Pravio are the most impressive.

== Zones of interest ==
- Cambre Roman Villa, a ruined Roman villa now converted into a small archaeological museum.
- Cecebre Dam, with a capacity of 530 ha and hosting a plentiful variety of local flora and fauna.

== See also ==
List of municipalities in A Coruña
