= Aviaco Flight 118 =

1973 plane crash in Spain

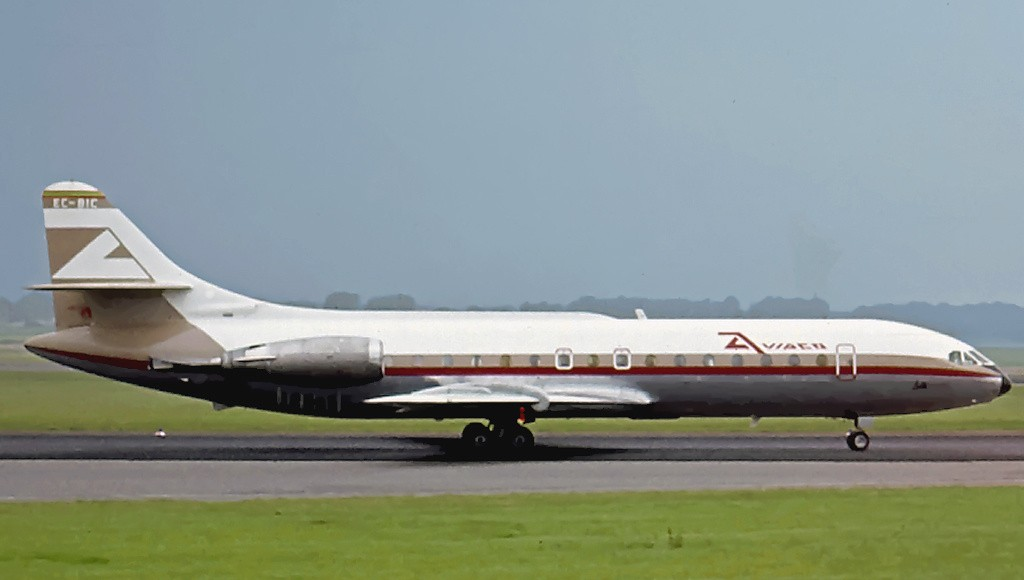
- EC-BIC, the aircraft involved in the accident

Accident
- Date: 13 August 1973
- Summary: Pilot error leading to Controlled flight into terrain
- Site: Montrove, Spain; 43°19′49″N 8°21′30.7″W
- Total fatalities: 86

Aircraft
- Aircraft type: Sud Aviation SE 210 Caravelle
- Aircraft name: Emilio Arrieta
- Operator: Aviaco
- Registration: EC-BIC
- Flight origin: Madrid-Barajas Airport, Madrid, Spain
- Destination: Alvedro Airport, A Coruña, Spain
- Passengers: 79
- Crew: 6
- Fatalities: 85
- Survivors: 0

Ground casualties
- Ground fatalities: 1

Aviaco Flight 118 was a Sud Aviation SE 210 Caravelle operated by Aviaco that crashed in the village of Montrove, Spain, on 13 August 1973, while attempting to land at Alvedro Airport in heavy fog. The aircraft crashed into several houses approximately 2 kilometres (1.2 mi; 1.1 nmi) from the airport. All 85 persons on board perished in the crash and subsequent fire. One person in the village also died.

== Background ==
Flight 118 was a seasonal daily flight from Madrid to A Coruña favoured by tourists. Local news reports indicated that AO118 was a special "vacation flight" run by Aviaco during the summer season, so as to provide easy access to Galicia's numerous ocean-side resorts.

== Accident ==
The aircraft had taken off normally from Madrid at 9:14 a.m. CEST. After an uneventful journey, the commander contacted the control tower at La Coruña Airport at 10:14, and was informed of the poor visibility in the area at that time. Despite being advised to stand by in anticipation of an early improvement in weather conditions, the crew began a first approach at 10:23 to check the actual visibility. The manoeuvre was frustrated, and the aircraft returned to an altitude of 2000 metres.

After a second unsuccessful approach, at 11:20 the tower warned Flight 118 that the fog was lifting, and that the horizontal visibility had increased to about 1500 metres and the vertical visibility was close to 300 metres. At 11:39, the crew reported that they had begun a new approach, this being the last communication received by the airport control tower. Shortly afterwards the aircraft hit eucalyptus trees, struck the ground and collided with several houses before bursting into flames.

== Aftermath ==
The collision and fire killed 84 of the aircraft's 85 occupants immediately. The only survivor, who was taken to the Hospital in La Coruña, died a few hours later as a result of the serious injuries suffered. In addition, one person on the ground was reported to have been killed.

== Cause ==
The official cause of the accident was the pilot's violation of air safety rules by landing in poor visibility. This fact was considered even more serious considering that at Santiago de Compostela Airport the visibility was good at the time of the accident, and being only 45 km away.
