= Church of Rome =

Holy Roman Church, Roman Church, Church of Rome or Church in Rome may refer to:

- The Diocese of Rome or the Holy See
- The Latin Church
- Churches of Rome (buildings)
- The Catholic Church (also known as the Roman Catholic Church)

In historical contexts Roman Church may also refer to:

- The first Christians in Rome
- The State church of the Roman Empire
- The church of the Holy Roman Empire
