= Arteixo =

- Municipality
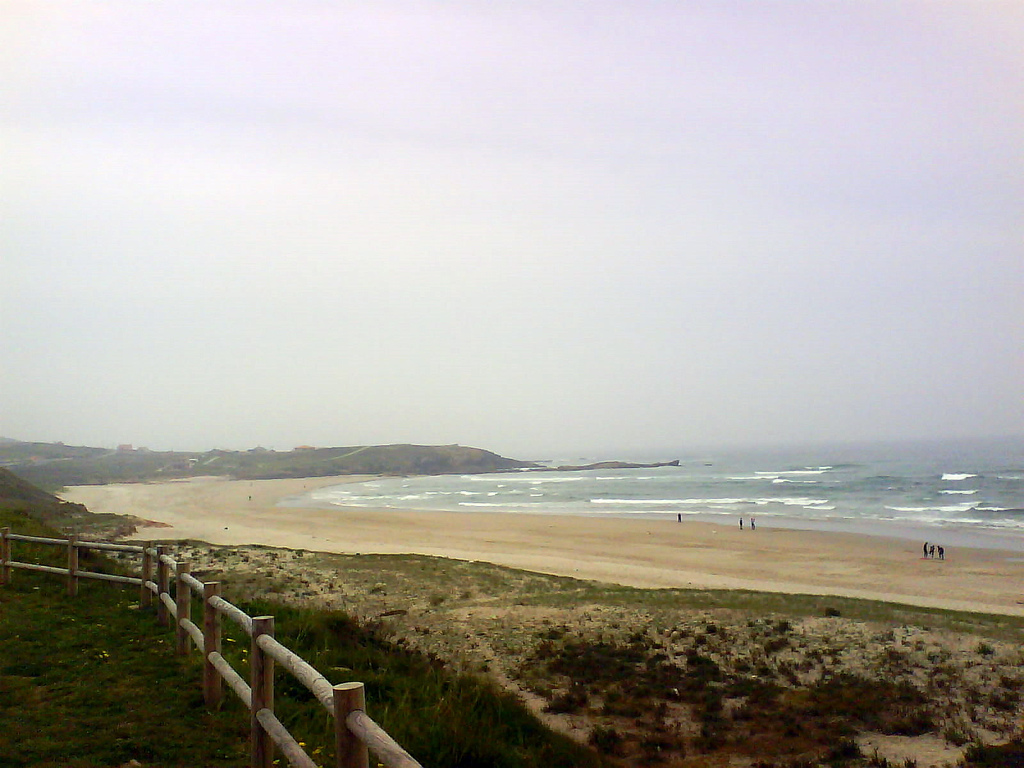
- Beach of Sabón.

- Coat of arms
- Interactive map of Arteixo
- Coordinates: 43°18′16″N 8°30′41″W
- Country: Spain
- Autonomous community: Galicia
- Province: A Coruña
- Comarca: A Coruña
- Parroquias: Armentón, Arteixo, Barrañán, Chamín, Lañas, Larín, Loureda, Monteagudo, Morás, Oseiro, Pastoriza, Sorrizo, Suevos

Government
  - Alcalde (Mayor): Carlos Calvelo Martínez (PP)

Area
  - Total: 93.76 km^{2} (36.20 sq mi)

Population (2024)
  - Total: 34,038
  - Density: 363.0/km^{2} (940.3/sq mi)
- Time zone: UTC+1 (CET)
  - Summer (DST): UTC+2 (CEST)
- Website: www.arteixo.es www.arteixoatlantico.com/en

Arteixo (Galician: [aɾ.ˈtej.ʃʊ]; Spanish: [aɾ.ˈtej.xo] (Arteijo)) is a municipality in the province of A Coruña, part of the autonomous community of Galicia in northwestern Spain. Its area is 93.76 km^{2} and its population is 31,005 (2013). Its population density is 317.43 people/km^{2}.

It is an industrial town that belongs to A Coruña metropolitan area.

== Notable landmarks ==
Notable landmarks are a Repsol refinery - with its associated industry - and the corporate headquarters of Inditex which is better known for its worldwide chain of clothing stores, Zara.

== Economy ==
It has tungsten, titanium and tin mines.

As of 2007, the Outer Harbour of A Coruña is being built here, in the Punta Langosteira Peninsula, to replace the busy harbour that is now in the city centre. The construction is planned to finish in 2020.

== Demographics ==
Historical population

| Year | Pop. | ±% |
|---|---|---|
| 1877 | 8,208 | — |
| 1887 | 8,165 | −0.5% |
| 1900 | 10,160 | +24.4% |
| 1910 | 10,397 | +2.3% |
| 1920 | 10,024 | −3.6% |
| 1930 | 10,127 | +1.0% |
| 1940 | 10,879 | +7.4% |

| Year | Pop. | ±% |
|---|---|---|
| 1950 | 10,722 | −1.4% |
| 1960 | 11,285 | +5.3% |
| 1970 | 12,380 | +9.7% |
| 1980 | 15,448 | +24.8% |
| 1990 | 17,931 | +16.1% |
| 2000 | 23,306 | +30.0% |
| 2010 | 30,630 | +31.4% |

Source: From: INE Archiv

== Geography ==
It is drained by rivers Seixedo and Arteixo.

== See also ==
- List of municipalities in A Coruña
