= A Coruña Airport =

Domestic airport serving A Coruña, Galicia, Spain

A Coruña Airport: Aeropuerto de A Coruña (Spanish) Aeroporto da Coruña (Galician)

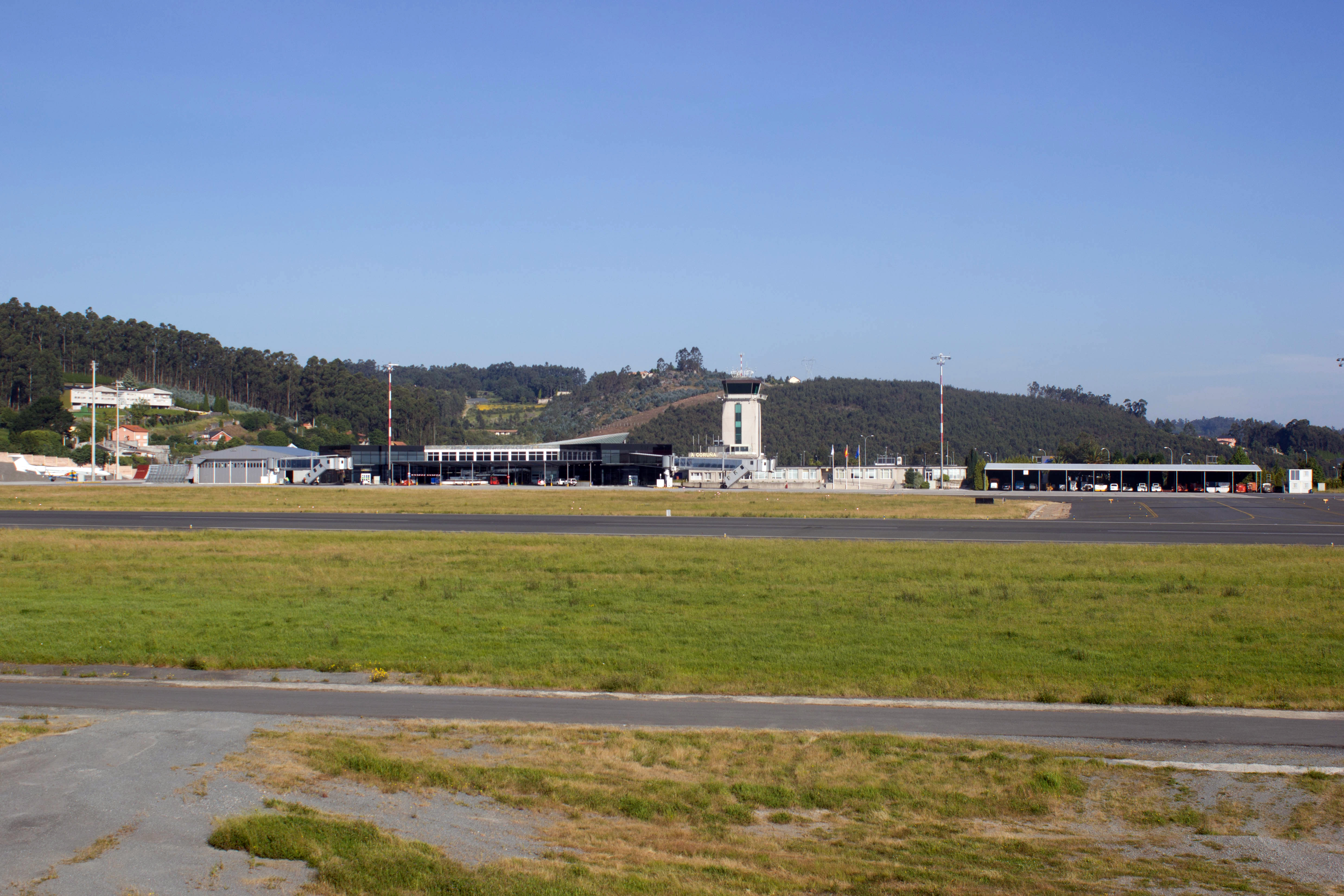
- IATA: LCG; ICAO: LECO

Summary
- Airport type: Public
- Owner/Operator: AENA
- Serves: A Coruña Galicia, Spain
- Location: Culleredo
- Elevation AMSL: 328 ft (100 m)
- Coordinates: 43°18′07″N 008°22′38″W

Map
- Location within Spain

Runways
Direction	Length		Surface
Direction	ft	m	Surface
03/21	7,178	2,188	Asphalt

Statistics (2025)
- Passengers: 1,292,166
- Passengers change 24-25: ▲4.4%
- Cargo (in metric tonnes): 30
- Cargo Change 24-25: ▼45.5%
- Movements: 16,251
- Movements change 24-25: ▲12.2%
- Sources: Aena

A Coruña Airport (IATA: LCG, ICAO: LECO), formerly known as Alvedro Airport, is the airport serving the Galician city of A Coruña in northwestern Spain. The airport is located in the municipality of Culleredo, approximately 7 kilometres (4.3 mi) from the city center. It is a part of the network of airports managed by Aena, a Spanish state-owned company responsible for airport management. Air traffic control is provided by Ferronats.

== History ==
=== Development since the 1990s ===
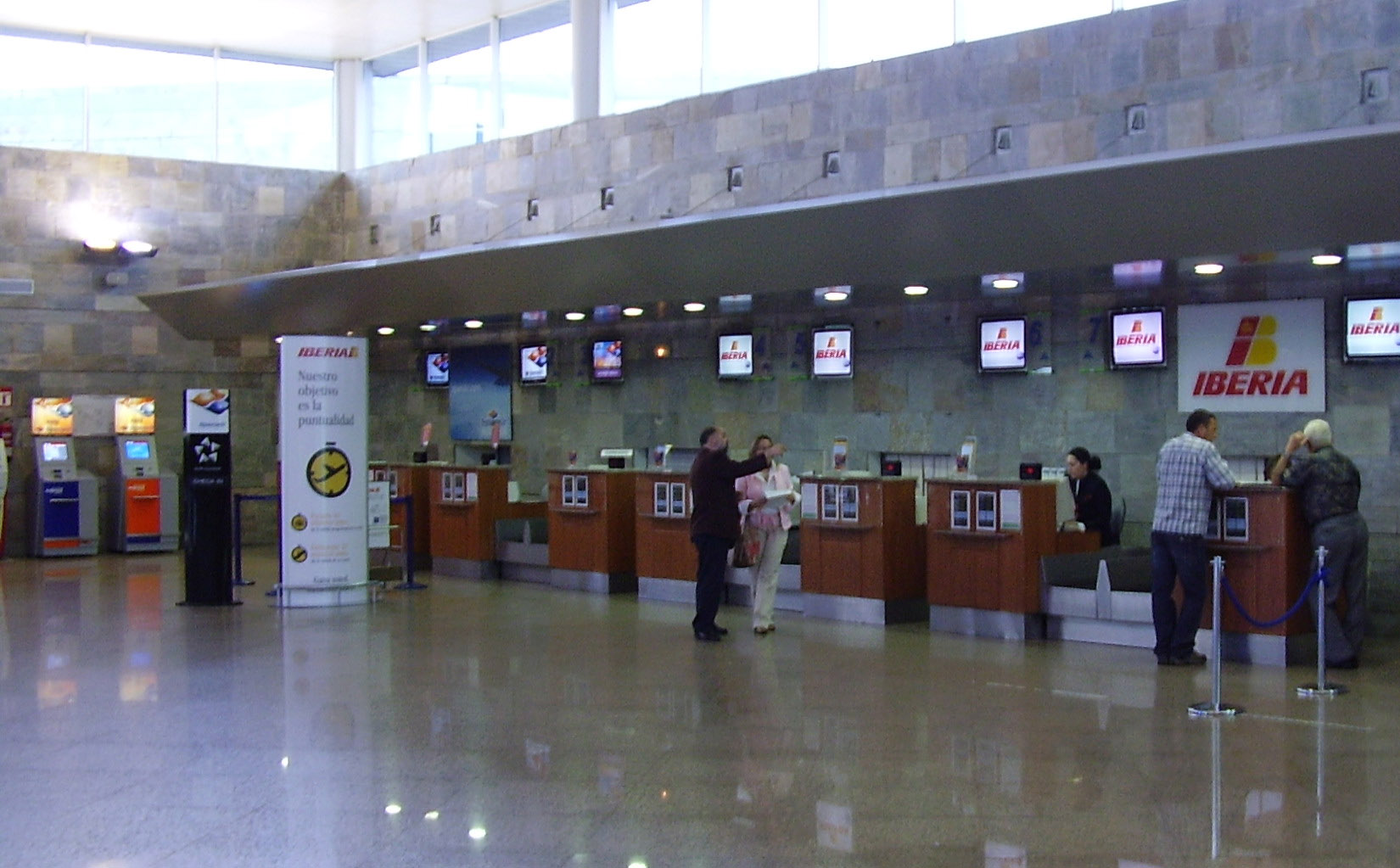
Check-in counters

By 1994, yearly passenger numbers had surpassed 259,000. Further expansion of the airport and its facilities, including a new terminal building, as well as the urbanization of the surrounding area has prompted continuous growth and the increasing popularity of the airport. In 2001, the airport installed jet bridges and a cargo terminal. Currently the airport has a single runway (03/21), 2,340 metres (7,680 ft) long.

== Airlines and destinations ==
The following airlines operate regular scheduled and charter flights at A Coruña Airport:

Airlines	Destinations
Air Europa	Madrid
Binter Canarias	Gran Canaria, Tenerife–North
easyJet	Geneva, Milan–Malpensa
Iberia	Madrid
Volotea	Alicante (begins 2 December 2026), Bilbao, Madrid (begins 27 November 2026), Málaga, Seville, Valencia
Vueling	Barcelona

== Statistics ==
=== Busiest routes ===
Busiest domestic routes from LCG (2023)
Rank	Destination	Passengers	Change 2022/23
1	Madrid	754,110	▲40%
2	Barcelona	258,844	▲8%
3	Valencia	31,506	▲26%
4	Málaga	30,197	▲39%
5	Bilbao	29,375	▲12%
Source: Estadísticas de tráfico aereo

== Accidents and incidents ==
- On 16 August 1973, Aviaco Flight 118 crashed while trying to land at Alvedro Airport. All 85 people on board the aircraft plus one person on the ground died.
