= Sada, Galicia =

Municipality of Galicia, Spain

Coordinates: 43°21′N 8°15′W

Concello de Sada
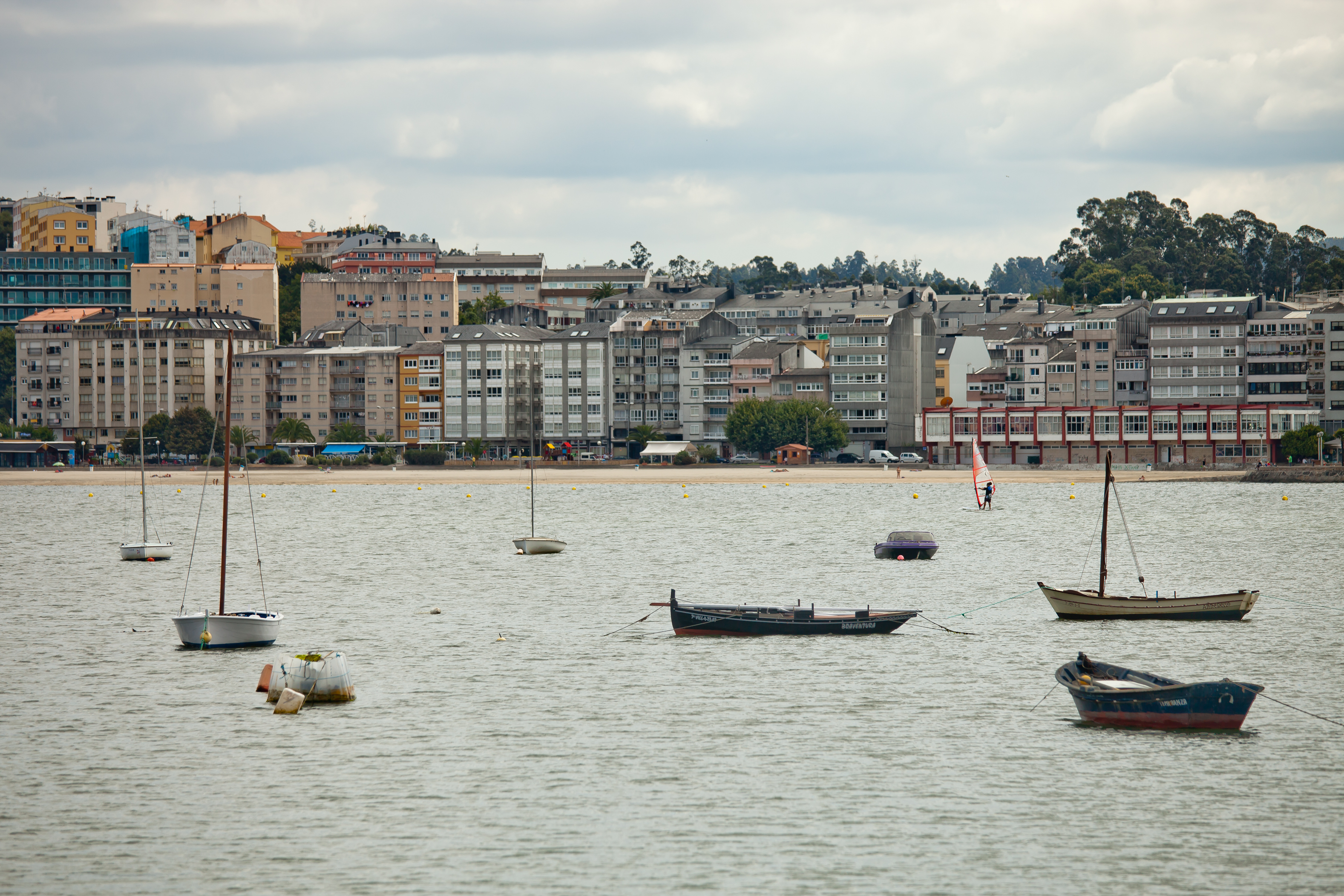

- Flag Coat of arms
- Nickname: Sada
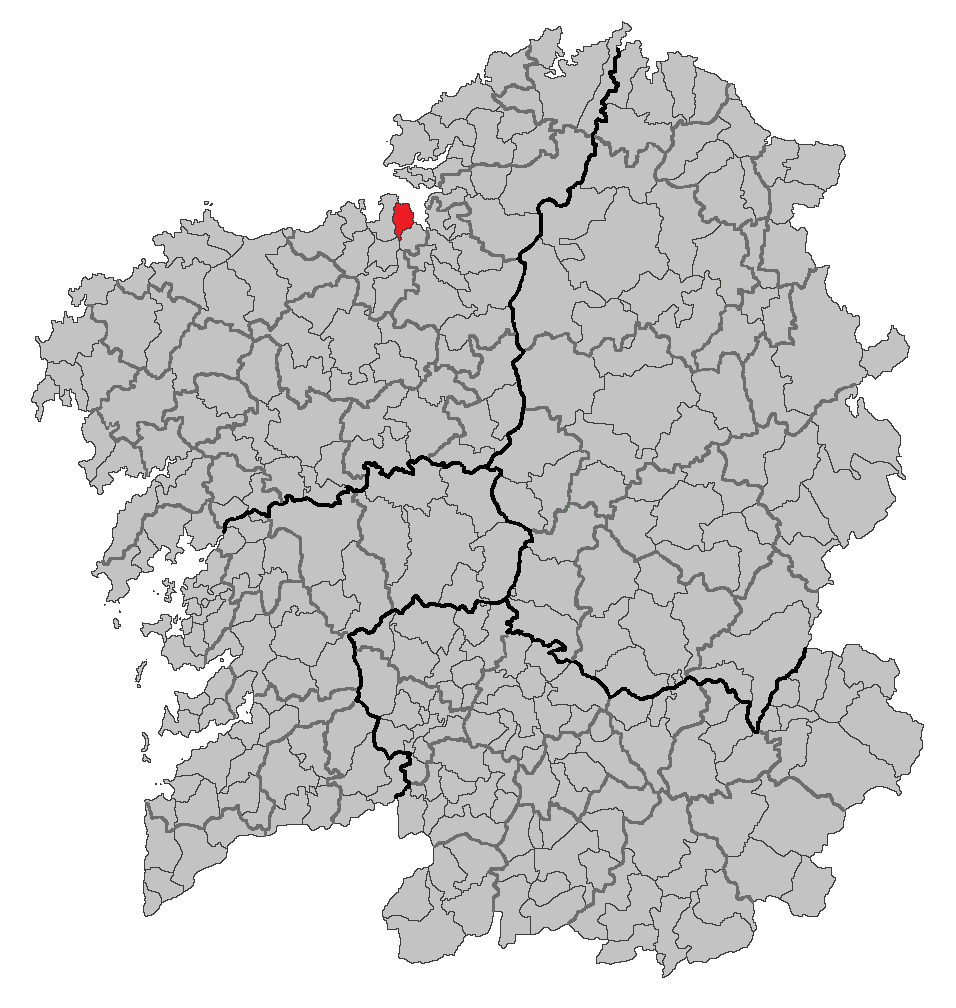
- Location of Sada within Galicia
- Parroquias: Carnoedo (Santo André), Meirás (San Martiño), Mondego (San Xián), Mosteirón (San Nicolao), Osedo (San Xián), Sada (Santa María), Soñeiro (San Xián), Veigue (Santa Comba)

Area
  - Total: 27.68 km^{2} (10.69 sq mi)

Population (2025-01-01)
  - Total: 17,421
  - Density: 629.4/km^{2} (1,630/sq mi)
- Time zone: UTC+1 (CET)
  - Summer (DST): UTC+2 (CEST)
- Website: https://www.concellodesada.com/

Sada is a municipality of northwestern Spain in the province of A Coruña, in the autonomous community of Galicia. It is situated in the Rías Altas.

== See also ==
List of municipalities in A Coruña
