= Culleredo =

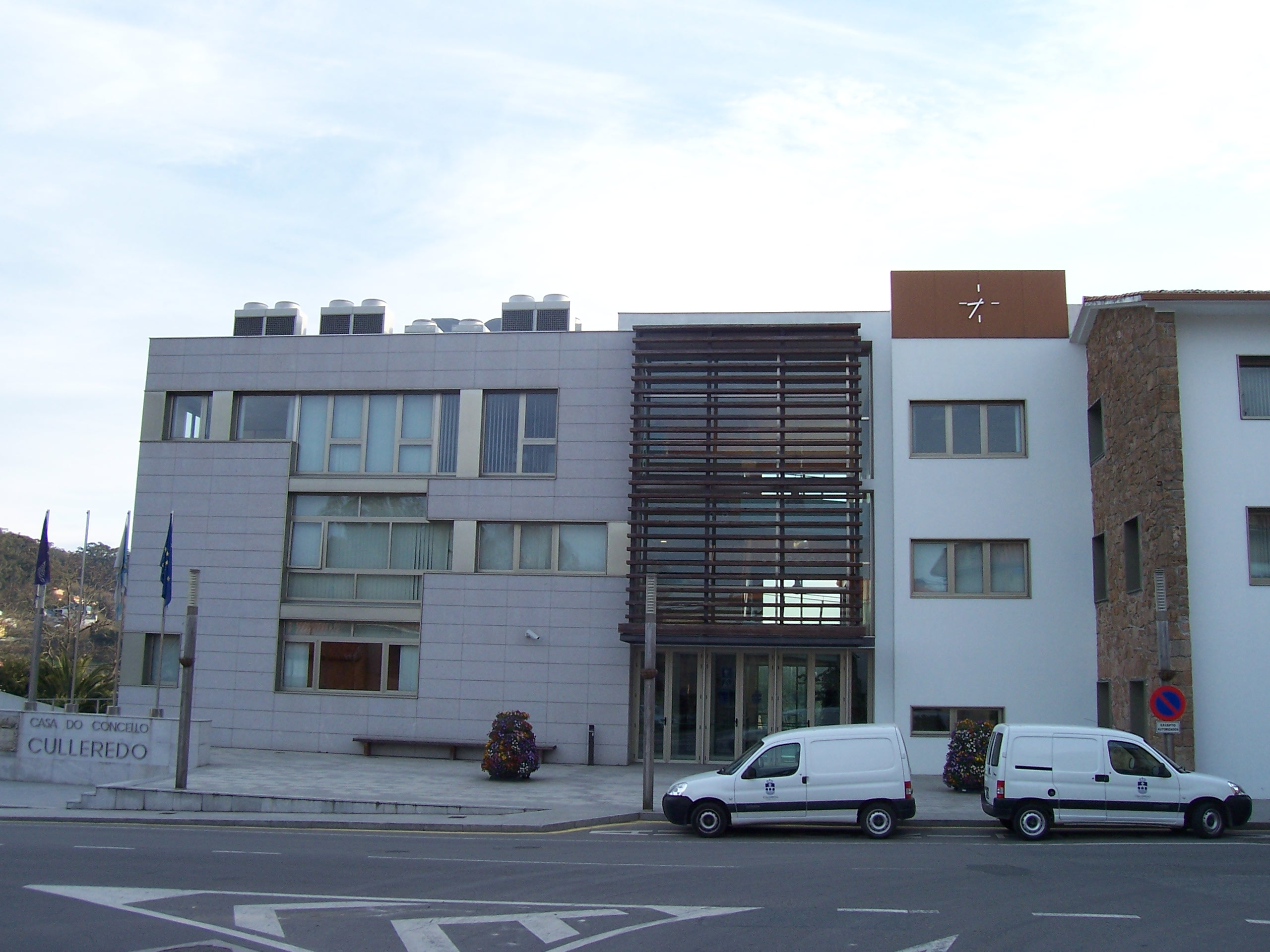

- Flag Coat of arms
- Nickname: Culleredo
- Location within Province of A Coruña Location within Spain
- Coordinates: 43°17′18″N 8°23′22″W
- Country: Spain
- Autonomous community: Galicia
- Province: A Coruña
- Parroquia: 11

Government
  - Alcalde (Mayor): Julio Sacristán de Diego (PSdeG-PSOE)

Area
  - Total: 63 km^{2} (24 sq mi)

Population (2025-01-01)
  - Total: 31,254
  - Density: 500/km^{2} (1,300/sq mi)
- Time zone: UTC+1 (CET)
  - Summer (DST): UTC+2 (CEST)

Culleredo (Spanish pronunciation: [kuʎeˈɾeðo], Galician: [kuɟeˈɾeðʊ]) is a municipality in the province of A Coruña, in the autonomous community of Galicia, northwestern Spain. Culleredo is located on the outskirts of A Coruña and its population is mainly formed of commuters. It is located in the central area of the province. It belongs to the comarca of A Coruña in the extreme south of the Burgo river. The population of Culleredo works in the service sector, and there is little industry and agriculture. The airport of A Coruña, or Alvedro, is also located in Culleredo.

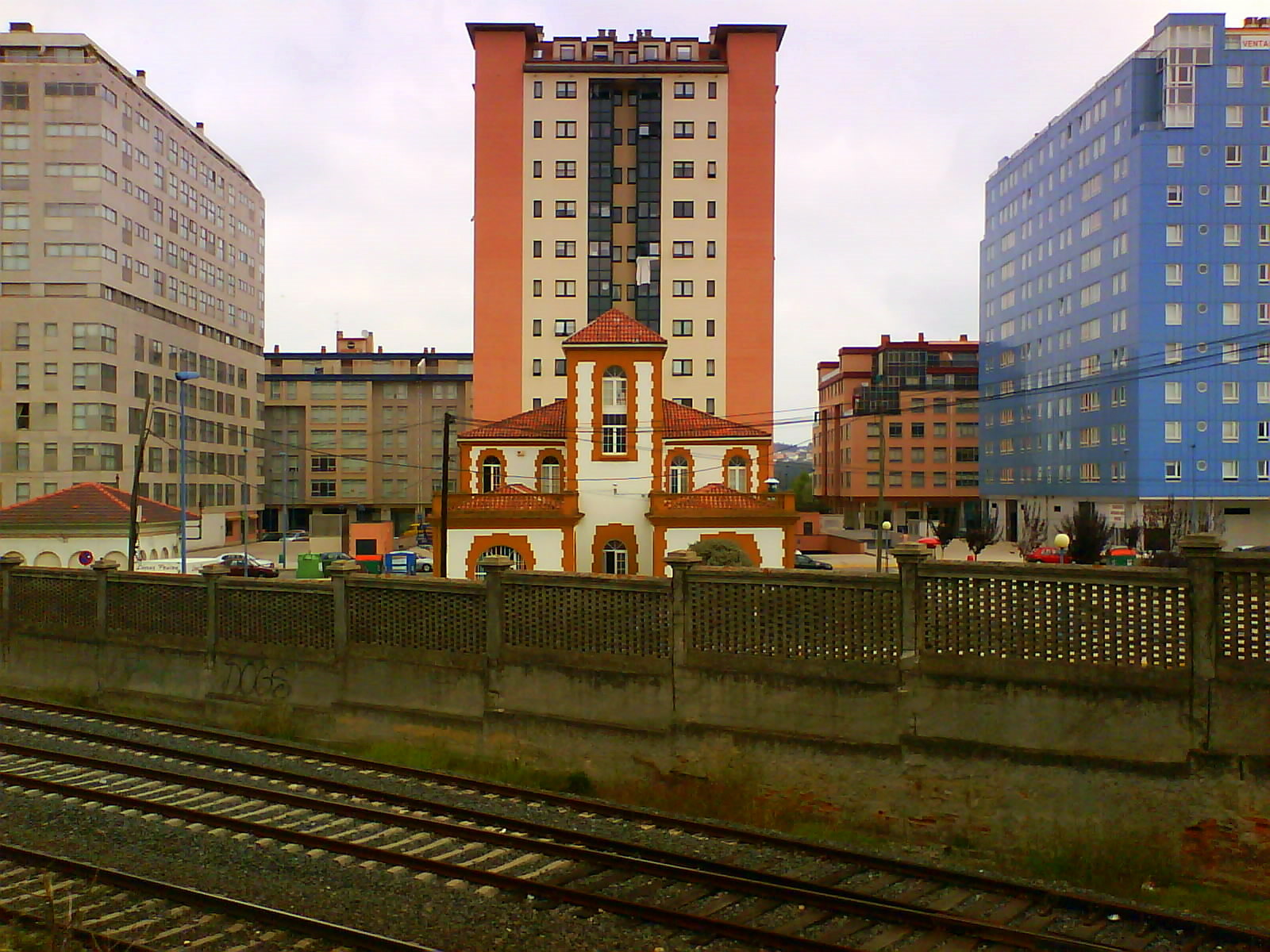
Culleredo

== Climate ==
Culleredo has a climate that is transitional between the mediterranean (Csb) and oceanic climates (Cfb) due to a sizeable summer drying trend that sits on the threshold between the two classifications. Culleredo is somewhat more prone to extremes than urban A Coruña, but is still heavily influenced by the warm Atlantic sea air in winter and mildened by the same air in summer, that renders the climate very mild for its latitude.

Climate data for A Coruña Airport (1991–2020 normals), 98 m asl, extremes since 1971
Month	Jan	Feb	Mar	Apr	May	Jun	Jul	Aug	Sep	Oct	Nov	Dec	Year
Record high °C (°F)	22.3 (72.1)	24.3 (75.7)	28.0 (82.4)	33.1 (91.6)	33.6 (92.5)	37.2 (99.0)	36.0 (96.8)	37.7 (99.9)	35.9 (96.6)	33.7 (92.7)	26.0 (78.8)	25.4 (77.7)	37.7 (99.9)
Mean daily maximum °C (°F)	13.2 (55.8)	14.0 (57.2)	15.9 (60.6)	16.9 (62.4)	19.2 (66.6)	21.5 (70.7)	23.2 (73.8)	23.8 (74.8)	22.6 (72.7)	19.6 (67.3)	15.6 (60.1)	13.9 (57.0)	18.3 (64.9)
Daily mean °C (°F)	9.6 (49.3)	9.8 (49.6)	11.4 (52.5)	12.5 (54.5)	14.8 (58.6)	17.2 (63.0)	18.9 (66.0)	19.3 (66.7)	17.9 (64.2)	15.3 (59.5)	12.0 (53.6)	10.2 (50.4)	14.1 (57.4)
Mean daily minimum °C (°F)	5.9 (42.6)	5.5 (41.9)	6.9 (44.4)	8.0 (46.4)	10.4 (50.7)	12.9 (55.2)	14.7 (58.5)	14.8 (58.6)	13.2 (55.8)	11.0 (51.8)	8.2 (46.8)	6.5 (43.7)	9.9 (49.8)
Record low °C (°F)	−4.8 (23.4)	−4.3 (24.3)	−3.3 (26.1)	−1.0 (30.2)	0.6 (33.1)	3.4 (38.1)	5.8 (42.4)	5.2 (41.4)	3.0 (37.4)	0.6 (33.1)	−4.0 (24.8)	−4.7 (23.5)	−4.8 (23.4)
Average precipitation mm (inches)	115.9 (4.56)	91.2 (3.59)	92.4 (3.64)	93.6 (3.69)	73.4 (2.89)	48.6 (1.91)	33.6 (1.32)	40.5 (1.59)	62.0 (2.44)	129.3 (5.09)	159.4 (6.28)	134.4 (5.29)	1,074.3 (42.29)
Average precipitation days (≥ 1 mm)	13.8	11.1	12.1	12.8	10.3	6.7	5.7	6.1	8.2	12.9	15.7	14.6	130
Mean monthly sunshine hours	96	124	159	180	206	215	244	248	192	150	103	91	2,008
Source: Météo Climat

Climate data for A Coruña Airport (1981-2010 normals), 98 m asl
Month	Jan	Feb	Mar	Apr	May	Jun	Jul	Aug	Sep	Oct	Nov	Dec	Year
Record high °C (°F)	22.1 (71.8)	23.4 (74.1)	28.0 (82.4)	33.1 (91.6)	32.5 (90.5)	37.2 (99.0)	36.0 (96.8)	37.7 (99.9)	34.4 (93.9)	33.7 (92.7)	26.0 (78.8)	25.4 (77.7)	37.7 (99.9)
Mean daily maximum °C (°F)	13.1 (55.6)	13.8 (56.8)	15.7 (60.3)	16.5 (61.7)	18.6 (65.5)	21.4 (70.5)	23.1 (73.6)	23.7 (74.7)	22.6 (72.7)	19.2 (66.6)	15.7 (60.3)	13.7 (56.7)	18.1 (64.6)
Daily mean °C (°F)	9.3 (48.7)	9.5 (49.1)	11.1 (52.0)	12.1 (53.8)	14.4 (57.9)	17.1 (62.8)	18.7 (65.7)	19.1 (66.4)	17.7 (63.9)	14.9 (58.8)	11.8 (53.2)	9.9 (49.8)	13.8 (56.8)
Mean daily minimum °C (°F)	5.4 (41.7)	5.2 (41.4)	6.6 (43.9)	7.7 (45.9)	10.1 (50.2)	12.7 (54.9)	14.3 (57.7)	14.5 (58.1)	12.9 (55.2)	10.6 (51.1)	7.9 (46.2)	6.1 (43.0)	9.5 (49.1)
Record low °C (°F)	−4.8 (23.4)	−4.3 (24.3)	−3.3 (26.1)	−1.0 (30.2)	0.6 (33.1)	3.4 (38.1)	5.8 (42.4)	5.2 (41.4)	3.0 (37.4)	0.6 (33.1)	−4.0 (24.8)	−4.7 (23.5)	−4.8 (23.4)
Average precipitation mm (inches)	121 (4.8)	102 (4.0)	85 (3.3)	99 (3.9)	82 (3.2)	45 (1.8)	35 (1.4)	36 (1.4)	72 (2.8)	139 (5.5)	140 (5.5)	144 (5.7)	1,106 (43.5)
Average precipitation days (≥ 1 mm)	13.6	12.0	11.6	13.5	11.8	6.7	5.6	5.9	8.2	13.3	13.9	14.6	130.7
Average snowy days	0.2	0	0	0	0	0	0	0	0	0	0	0	0.2
Average relative humidity (%)	77	74	71	72	73	73	74	74	75	78	79	78	75
Mean monthly sunshine hours	99	117	155	173	194	217	236	240	181	142	104	94	1,939
Source 1: Agencia Estatal de Meteorología
Source 2: Agencia Estatal de Meteorología

== Notable people ==
- Juan Lembeye (1816–1889), naturalist, died in Culleredo

== See also ==
List of municipalities in A Coruña
