= List of Wizz Air destinations =

Wizz Air as well as its subsidiaries Wizz Air Abu Dhabi, Wizz Air Malta, and Wizz Air UK operate flights to the following destinations.

== List ==
| Country | Town | Airport | Notes | Refs |
|---|---|---|---|---|
| Albania | Kukës | Kukës International Airport Zayed | Terminated | |
| Albania | Tirana | Tirana International Airport Nënë Tereza | Base | |
| Armenia | Gyumri | Gyumri Shirak International Airport | | |
| Armenia | Yerevan | Zvartnots International Airport | Base | |
| Austria | Salzburg | Salzburg Airport | Terminated | |
| Austria | Vienna | Vienna International Airport | Terminated | |
| Azerbaijan | Baku | Heydar Aliyev International Airport | | |
| Azerbaijan | Qabala | Qabala International Airport | Terminated | |
| Bahrain | Manama | Bahrain International Airport | Terminated | |
| Belgium | Brussels | Brussels Airport | Terminated | |
| Belgium | Charleroi | Brussels South Charleroi Airport | | |
| Bosnia and Herzegovina | Banja Luka | Banja Luka International Airport | | |
| Bosnia and Herzegovina | Sarajevo | Sarajevo International Airport | | |
| Bosnia and Herzegovina | Tuzla | Tuzla International Airport | Base | |
| Bulgaria | Burgas | Burgas Airport | | |
| Bulgaria | Plovdiv | Plovdiv Airport | | |
| Bulgaria | Sofia | Vasil Levski Sofia Airport | Base | |
| Bulgaria | Varna | Varna Airport | Base | |
| Croatia | Dubrovnik | Dubrovnik Airport | Seasonal | |
| Croatia | Osijek | Osijek Airport | Terminated | |
| Croatia | Split | Split Airport | Seasonal | |
| Croatia | Zagreb | Zagreb Airport | Terminated | |
| Cyprus | Larnaca | Larnaca International Airport | Base | |
| Czech Republic | Brno | Brno-Tuřany Airport | Terminated | |
| Czech Republic | Pardubice | Pardubice Airport | Terminated | |
| Czech Republic | Prague | Václav Havel Airport Prague | | |
| Denmark | Aarhus | Aarhus Airport | Terminated | |
| Denmark | Billund | Billund Airport | | |
| Denmark | Copenhagen | Copenhagen Airport | | |
| Egypt | Alexandria | Borg El Arab International Airport | Terminated | |
| Egypt | Assiut | Assiut Airport | Terminated | |
| Egypt | Giza | Sphinx International Airport | | |
| Egypt | Hurghada | Hurghada International Airport | | |
| Egypt | Luxor | Luxor International Airport | Terminated | |
| Egypt | Marsa Alam | Marsa Alam International Airport | | |
| Egypt | Sharm El Sheikh | Sharm El Sheikh International Airport | | |
| Egypt | Sohag | Sohag International Airport | Terminated | |
| Estonia | Tallinn | Tallinn Airport | | |
| Finland | Helsinki | Helsinki Airport | Terminated | |
| Finland | Tampere | Tampere–Pirkkala Airport | Terminated | |
| Finland | Turku | Turku Airport | | |
| France | Beauvais | Beauvais–Tillé Airport | | |
| France | Bordeaux | Bordeaux–Mérignac Airport | | |
| France | Grenoble | Grenoble–Isère Airport | Seasonal | |
| France | Lyon | Lyon–Saint-Exupéry Airport | | |
| France | Nice | Nice Côte d'Azur Airport | | |
| France | Paris | Orly Airport | | |
| Georgia | Kutaisi | Kutaisi International Airport | Base | |
| Germany | Berlin | Berlin Brandenburg Airport | | |
| Germany | Bremen | Bremen Airport | | |
| Germany | Cologne/Bonn | Cologne Bonn Airport | | |
| Germany | Dortmund | Dortmund Airport | | |
| Germany | Frankfurt | Frankfurt Airport | Terminated | |
| Germany | Friedrichshafen | Friedrichshafen Airport | | |
| Germany | Hahn | Frankfurt–Hahn Airport | | |
| Germany | Hamburg | Hamburg Airport | | |
| Germany | Hanover | Hannover Airport | Terminated | |
| Germany | Karlsruhe/Baden-Baden | Karlsruhe/Baden-Baden Airport | | |
| Germany | Leipzig/Halle (Saale) | Leipzig/Halle Airport | | |
| Germany | Lübeck | Lübeck Airport | Terminated | |
| Germany | Memmingen | Memmingen Airport | | |
| Germany | Nuremberg | Nuremberg Airport | | |
| Germany | Saarbrucken | Saarbrucken Airport | Terminated | |
| Germany | Stuttgart | Stuttgart Airport | | |
| Germany | Weeze | Weeze Airport | Terminated | |
| Gibraltar | Gibraltar | Gibraltar International Airport | Terminated | |
| Greece | Athens | Athens International Airport | | |
| Greece | Chania | Chania International Airport | Seasonal | |
| Greece | Corfu | Corfu International Airport | Seasonal | |
| Greece | Heraklion | Heraklion International Airport | Seasonal | |
| Greece | Kos | Kos International Airport | Seasonal | |
| Greece | Mykonos | Mykonos Airport | Seasonal | |
| Greece | Preveza | Aktion National Airport | Terminated | |
| Greece | Rhodes | Rhodes International Airport | Seasonal | |
| Greece | Santorini | Santorini International Airport | Seasonal | |
| Greece | Thessaloniki | Thessaloniki Airport | | |
| Greece | Zakynthos | Zakynthos International Airport | Seasonal | |
| Hungary | Budapest | Budapest Ferenc Liszt International Airport | Base | |
| Hungary | Debrecen | Debrecen International Airport | | |
| Hungary | Lake Balaton | Hévíz–Balaton Airport | Terminated | |
| Iceland | Reykjavík | Keflavík International Airport | | |
| Iraq | Erbil | Erbil International Airport | Terminated | |
| Ireland | Cork | Cork Airport | Terminated | |
| Israel | Eilat | Ovda Airport | Airport closed | |
| Israel | Eilat | Ramon Airport | Terminated | |
| Israel | Tel Aviv | Ben Gurion Airport | | |
| Italy | Alghero | Alghero–Fertilia Airport | | |
| Italy | Ancona | Marche Airport | | |
| Italy | Bari | Bari Karol Wojtyła Airport | | |
| Italy | Bergamo | Milan Bergamo Airport | | |
| Italy | Bologna | Bologna Guglielmo Marconi Airport | | |
| Italy | Brindisi | Brindisi Airport | | |
| Italy | Cagliari | Cagliari Elmas Airport | Resumes 14 December 2026 | |
| Italy | Catania | Catania–Fontanarossa Airport | Base | |
| Italy | Comiso | Comiso Airport | Seasonal | |
| Italy | Cuneo | Cuneo International Airport | Terminated | |
| Italy | Forlì | Forlì Airport | Terminated | |
| Italy | Genoa | Genoa Cristoforo Colombo Airport | | |
| Italy | Lamezia Terme | Lamezia Terme International Airport | | |
| Italy | Lampedusa | Lampedusa Airport | | |
| Italy | Milan | Linate Airport | Terminated | |
| Italy | Milan | Milan Malpensa Airport | Base | |
| Italy | Naples | Naples International Airport | Base | |
| Italy | Olbia | Olbia Costa Smeralda Airport | Seasonal | |
| Italy | Palermo | Falcone Borsellino Airport | Base | |
| Italy | Parma | Parma Airport | Terminated | |
| Italy | Perugia | Perugia San Francesco d'Assisi – Umbria International Airport | | |
| Italy | Pescara | Abruzzo Airport | | |
| Italy | Pisa | Pisa International Airport | | |
| Italy | Rome | Rome Ciampino Airport | Seasonal | |
| Italy | Rome | Rome Fiumicino Airport | Base | |
| Italy | Salerno | Salerno Costa d'Amalfi Airport | Seasonal | |
| Italy | Treviso | Treviso Airport | | |
| Italy | Trieste | Trieste Airport | | |
| Italy | Turin | Turin Airport | Base | |
| Italy | Venice | Venice Marco Polo Airport | Base | |
| Italy | Verona Villafranca Airport | | | |
| Jordan | Amman | Queen Alia International Airport | | |
| Jordan | Aqaba | King Hussein International Airport | Terminated | |
| Kazakhstan | Almaty | Almaty International Airport | Terminated | |
| Kazakhstan | Astana | Nursultan Nazarbayev International Airport | Terminated | |
| Kazakhstan | Türkıstan | Äziret Sūltan International Airport | Terminated | |
| Kosovo | Pristina | Pristina International Airport | Base | |
| Kuwait | Kuwait City | Kuwait International Airport | Terminated | |
| Kyrgyzstan | Bishkek | Manas International Airport | Terminated | |
| Latvia | Riga | Riga International Airport | Terminated | |
| Lebanon | Beirut | Beirut–Rafic Hariri International Airport | Terminated | |
| Lithuania | Kaunas | Kaunas Airport | | |
| Lithuania | Palanga | Palanga International Airport | | |
| Lithuania | Vilnius | Vilnius Čiurlionis International Airport | Base | |
| Luxembourg | Luxembourg City | Luxembourg Airport | Terminated | |
| Maldives | Malé | Velana International Airport | Terminated | |
| Malta | Luqa | Malta International Airport | | |
| Moldova | Chişinău | Chișinău Eugen Doga International Airport | Base | |
| Montenegro | Podgorica | Podgorica Airport | Base | |
| Montenegro | Tivat | Tivat Airport | Terminated | |
| Morocco | Agadir | Agadir–Al Massira Airport | | |
| Morocco | Casablanca | Mohammed V International Airport | Terminated | |
| Morocco | Marrakesh | Marrakesh Menara Airport | | |
| Netherlands | Amsterdam | Amsterdam Airport Schiphol | Terminated | |
| Netherlands | Eindhoven | Eindhoven Airport | | |
| Netherlands | Groningen | Groningen Airport Eelde | Terminated | |
| Netherlands | Maastricht/Aachen | Maastricht Aachen Airport | | |
| North Macedonia | Ohrid | Ohrid St. Paul the Apostle Airport | | |
| North Macedonia | Skopje | Skopje International Airport | Base | |
| Norway | Ålesund | Ålesund Airport, Vigra | | |
| Norway | Alta | Alta Airport | | |
| Norway | Bergen | Bergen Airport, Flesland | | |
| Norway | Bodø | Bodø Airport | Terminated | |
| Norway | Harstad/Narvik | Harstad/Narvik Airport, Evenes | Terminated | |
| Norway | Haugesund | Haugesund Airport | | |
| Norway | Kirkenes | Kirkenes Airport | Terminated | |
| Norway | Kristiansand | Kristiansand Airport | Terminated | |
| Norway | Molde | Molde Airport | Terminated | |
| Norway | Oslo | Oslo Airport, Gardermoen | | |
| Norway | Sandefjord | Sandefjord Airport, Torp | | |
| Norway | Stavanger | Stavanger Airport | | |
| Norway | Tromsø | Tromsø Airport | | |
| Norway | Trondheim | Trondheim Airport | | |
| Oman | Muscat | Muscat International Airport | Terminated | |
| Oman | Salalah | Salalah International Airport | Terminated | |
| Poland | Gdańsk | Gdańsk Lech Wałęsa Airport | Base | |
| Poland | Radom | Warsaw-Radom Airport | | |
| Poland | Bydgoszcz | Bydgoszcz Ignacy Jan Paderewski Airport | Terminated | |
| Poland | Katowice | Katowice Airport | Base | |
| Poland | Kraków | Kraków John Paul II International Airport | Base | |
| Poland | Łódź | Łódź Władysław Reymont Airport | | |
| Poland | Lublin | Lublin Airport | | |
| Poland | Olsztyn | Olsztyn-Mazury Airport | | |
| Poland | Poznań | Poznań–Ławica Airport | | |
| Poland | Rzeszów | Rzeszów–Jasionka Airport | | |
| Poland | Szczecin | Solidarity Szczecin–Goleniów Airport | | |
| Poland | Warsaw | Warsaw Chopin Airport | Base | |
| Poland | Nowy Dwór Mazowiecki | Warsaw Modlin Airport | Base | |
| Poland | Wrocław | Wrocław Airport | Base | |
| Portugal | Faro | Gago Coutinho Airport | | |
| Portugal | Funchal | Cristiano Ronaldo International Airport | | |
| Portugal | Lisbon | Humberto Delgado Airport | | |
| Portugal | Porto | Francisco Sá Carneiro Airport | Seasonal | |
| Romania | Arad | Arad International Airport | Terminated | |
| Romania | Bacău | George Enescu International Airport | | |
| Romania | Brașov | Brașov-Ghimbav International Airport | | |
| Romania | Bucharest | Aurel Vlaicu International Airport | Base | |
| Romania | Bucharest | Bucharest Henri Coandă International Airport | Base | |
| Romania | Cluj-Napoca | Cluj International Airport | Base | |
| Romania | Constanta | Constanta International Airport | | |
| Romania | Craiova | Craiova International Airport | Base | |
| Romania | Iași | Iași International Airport | Base | |
| Romania | Satu Mare | Satu Mare International Airport | | |
| Romania | Sibiu | Sibiu International Airport | Base | |
| Romania | Suceava | Suceava Ștefan cel Mare International Airport | Base | |
| Romania | Târgu Mureş | Târgu Mureş International Airport | Base | |
| Romania | Timișoara | Timișoara Traian Vuia International Airport | Base | |
| Russia | Kazan | Kazan International Airport | Terminated | |
| Russia | Moscow | Vnukovo International Airport | Terminated | |
| Russia | Saint Petersburg | Pulkovo Airport | Terminated | |
| Saudi Arabia | Dammam | King Fahd International Airport | Terminated | |
| Saudi Arabia | Jeddah | King Abdulaziz International Airport | | |
| Saudi Arabia | Madinah | Prince Mohammad bin Abdulaziz International Airport | | |
| Saudi Arabia | Riyadh | King Khalid International Airport | Terminated | |
| Serbia | Belgrade | Belgrade Nikola Tesla Airport | Base | |
| Serbia | Niš | Niš Constantine the Great Airport | | |
| Slovakia | Bratislava | Bratislava Airport | Base | |
| Slovakia | Košice | Košice International Airport | | |
| Slovakia | Poprad | Poprad–Tatry Airport | | |
| Slovenia | Ljubljana | Ljubljana Jože Pučnik Airport | | |
| Spain | Alicante | Alicante–Elche Miguel Hernández Airport | | |
| Spain | Barcelona | Josep Tarradellas Barcelona–El Prat Airport | | |
| Spain | Castellón de la Plana | Castellón–Costa Azahar Airport | | |
| Spain | Fuerteventura | Fuerteventura Airport | | |
| Spain | Girona | Girona–Costa Brava Airport | | |
| Spain | Gran Canaria | Gran Canaria Airport | Seasonal | |
| Spain | Ibiza | Ibiza Airport | Seasonal | |
| Spain | Lanzarote | Lanzarote Airport | | |
| Spain | Madrid | Adolfo Suárez Madrid–Barajas Airport | Base | |
| Spain | Málaga | Málaga Airport | | |
| Spain | Menorca | Menorca Airport | | |
| Spain | Palma de Mallorca | Palma de Mallorca Airport | | |
| Spain | Santander | Santander Airport | Seasonal | |
| Spain | Seville | Seville Airport | | |
| Spain | Tenerife | Tenerife North Airport | | |
| Spain | Tenerife | Tenerife South Airport | | |
| Spain | Valencia | Valencia Airport | Base | |
| Spain | Zaragoza | Zaragoza Airport | | |
| Sweden | Gothenburg | Göteborg Landvetter Airport | | |
| Sweden | Gothenburg | Säve Airport | Airport closed | |
| Sweden | Malmö | Malmö Airport | | |
| Sweden | Skellefteå | Skellefteå Airport | Terminated | |
| Sweden | Stockholm | Stockholm Arlanda Airport | | |
| Sweden | Stockholm | Stockholm Skavsta Airport | | |
| Sweden | Västerås | Stockholm Västerås Airport | Terminated | |
| Sweden | Växjö | Växjö Airport | Terminated | |
| Switzerland | Geneva | Geneva Airport | Terminated | |
| Switzerland; France; Germany | Basel; Mulhouse; Freiburg | EuroAirport Basel Mulhouse Freiburg | | |
| Turkey | Ankara | Ankara Esenboğa Airport | Terminated | |
| Turkey | Antalya | Antalya Airport | | |
| Turkey | Bodrum | Milas–Bodrum Airport | Terminated | |
| Turkey | Dalaman | Dalaman Airport | | |
| Turkey | Istanbul | Istanbul Sabiha Gökçen International Airport | Terminated | |
| Turkey | Istanbul | Istanbul Airport | | |
| Turkey | İzmir | İzmir Adnan Menderes Airport | Terminated | |
| Ukraine | Donetsk | Donetsk International Airport | Airport closed | |
| Ukraine | Kharkiv | Kharkiv International Airport | Terminated | |
| Ukraine | Kyiv | Boryspil International Airport | Terminated | |
| Ukraine | Kyiv | Kyiv International Airport (Zhuliany) | Terminated | |
| Ukraine | Luhansk | Luhansk International Airport | Airport closed | |
| Ukraine | Lviv | Lviv Danylo Halytskyi International Airport | Terminated | |
| Ukraine | Odesa | Odesa International Airport | Terminated | |
| Ukraine | Simferopol | Simferopol International Airport | Terminated | |
| Ukraine | Zaporizhzhia | Zaporizhzhia International Airport | Terminated | |
| United Arab Emirates | Abu Dhabi | Zayed International Airport | | |
| United Arab Emirates | Dubai | Al Maktoum International Airport | Terminated | |
| United Arab Emirates | Dubai | Dubai International Airport | | |
| United Kingdom | Aberdeen | Aberdeen Airport | | |
| United Kingdom | Belfast | Belfast International Airport | Terminated | |
| United Kingdom | Birmingham | Birmingham Airport | | |
| United Kingdom | Bournemouth | Bournemouth Airport | Terminated | |
| United Kingdom | Bristol | Bristol Airport | Terminated | |
| United Kingdom | Cardiff | Cardiff Airport | Terminated | |
| United Kingdom | Coventry | Coventry Airport | Airport closed | |
| United Kingdom | Doncaster/Sheffield | Doncaster Sheffield Airport | Airport closed | |
| United Kingdom | Edinburgh | Edinburgh Airport | Terminated | |
| United Kingdom | Glasgow | Glasgow Airport | Terminated | |
| United Kingdom | Glasgow | Glasgow Prestwick Airport | Terminated | |
| United Kingdom | Leeds | Leeds Bradford Airport | | |
| United Kingdom | Liverpool | Liverpool John Lennon Airport | | |
| United Kingdom | London | Gatwick Airport | Base | |
| United Kingdom | London | Luton Airport | Base | |
| United Kingdom | London | London Southend Airport | Terminated | |
| United Kingdom | London | London Stansted Airport | Terminated | |
| United Kingdom | Teesside | Teesside International Airport | Terminated | |
| Uzbekistan | Samarkand | Samarkand International Airport | Terminated | |
| Uzbekistan | Tashkent | Tashkent International Airport | Terminated | |
