= List of airline codes (W) =

This is a list of all airline codes. The table lists the IATA airline designators, the ICAO airline designators and the airline call signs (telephony designator). Historical assignments are also included for completeness.

== Codes ==
Airline codes
IATA	ICAO	Airline	Call sign	Country	Comments
WD	WDL	WDL Aviation	WDL	Germany	
	WRR	WRA Inc	WRAP AIR	United States	
	XWS	WSI Corporation		United States	
	CGG	Walmart Aviation	CHARGE	United States	
	WAS	Walsten Air Services	WALSTEN	Canada	
	GOT	WaltAir	GOTHIC	Sweden	
	WPT	Wapiti Aviation	WAPITI	Canada	
	WAV	Warbelow's Air Ventures	WARBELOW	United States	
	ATX	Warwickshire Aerocentre Ltd.	AIRTAX	United Kingdom	
WT	WSG	Wasaya Airways	WASAYA	Canada	
		Wayraperú	WAYRAPERÚ	Peru	
	WTC	Weasua Air Transport Company	WATCO	Liberia	
WH	WEB	WebJet Linhas Aéreas	WEB-BRASIL	Brazil	
	TDB	Welch Aviation	THUNDER BAY	United States	
2W	WLC	Welcome Air	WELCOMEAIR	Austria	
	BLW	Wermlandsflyg AB	BLUESTAR	Sweden	
	WCB	West Africa Airlines	KILO YANKEE	Ghana	
	WTF	West African Air Transport	WESTAF AIRTRANS	Senegal	
WZ	WSF	West African Airlines		Benin	
	WAC	West African Cargo Airlines	WESTAF CARGO	Mauritania	
PN	CHB	West Air (China)	WEST CHINA	China	
	WLX	West Air Luxembourg	WEST LUX	Luxembourg	
T2	SWN	West Atlantic Sweden	AIR SWEDEN	Sweden	
YH	WCW	West Caribbean Airways	WEST	Colombia	
	WCR	West Caribbean Costa Rica	WEST CARIBBEAN	Costa Rica	
8O	YWZ	West Coast Air	COAST AIR	Canada	
		West Coast Airlines		United States	
	WCG	West Coast Airlines	WHISKY INDIA	Ghana	
	WCA	West Coast Airways	WEST-LEONE	Sierra Leone	
	WCC	West Coast Charters	WEST COAST	United States	
	TEE	West Freugh DTEO	TEEBIRD	United Kingdom	
	WEW	West Wind Aviation	WESTWIND	Canada	
WS	WJA	WestJet	WESTJET	Canada	
	WAA	Westair Aviation	WESTAIR WINGS	Namibia	
	WSC	Westair Cargo Airlines	WESTCAR	Côte d'Ivoire	
	PCM	Westair Industries	PAC VALLEY	United States	
	BLK	Westcoast Energy	BLUE FLAME	Canada	
ST*	STT	Western Aircraft, Inc	SAWTOOTH	United States	
	WST	Western Air	WESTERN BAHAMAS	Bahamas	
	NPC	Western Air Couriers	NORPAC	United States	
	WAE	Western Air Express	WESTERN EXPRESS	United States	
WA	WAL	Western Airlines	WESTERN	United States	defunct
	WAL	Western Arctic Air	WESTERN ARCTIC	Canada	
	WTV	Western Aviators	WESTAVIA	United States	
	AAE	Western Express Air	ARIZONA	United States	defunct in 2007
	WES	Western Express Air Lines	WEST EX	Canada	
	WGN	Western Global Airlines	WESTERN GLOBAL	United States	Allocated in 2014
W7	KMR	Western Pacific Airlines	KOMSTAR	United States	
	WPA	Western Pacific Airservice	WESTPAC	Solomon Islands	
	WSL	Westflight Aviation	WEST LINE	United Kingdom	
	WSA	Westgates Airlines	WESTATES	United States	
	WHE	Westland Helicopters	WESTLAND	United Kingdom	
	WTP	Westpoint Air	WESTPOINT	Canada	
CN	WWD	Westward Airways	WESTWARD	United States	
	WHT	White	WHITEJET	Portugal	
	WEA	White Eagle Aviation	WHITE EAGLE	Poland	
	WRA	White River Air Services		Canada	
	WWL	Whyalla Airlines		Australia	
WF	WIF	Widerøe	WIDEROE	Norway	
WC	WAA	Wien Air Alaska	WIEN	United States	Wien Consolidated Airlines from 1968-1973
	WIG	Wiggins Airways	WIGGINS AIRWAYS	United States	
	WHS	Wiking Helikopter Service	WEEKING	Germany	
	WFO	Wilbur's Flight Operations	WILBURS	United States	
	WGP	Williams Grand Prix Engineering	GRAND PRIX	United Kingdom	
	WDA	Wimbi Dira Airways	WIMBI DIRA	Democratic Republic of Congo	
	WNA	Winair	WINAIR	United States	
P5	RPB	Wingo (airline)	AEROREPUBLICA	Colombia	
IV	JET	Wind Jet	GHIBLI	Italy	
	WSI	Wind Spirit Air	WIND SPIRIT	United States	
7W	QGA	Windrose Air	QUADRIGA	Germany	
	WIA	Winair	WINDWARD	Netherlands	
IW	WON	Wings Air	WINGS ABADI	Indonesia	Subsidiary of Lion Air
	WAT	Wings Air Transport		Sudan	
	WAW	Wings Airways	WING SHUTTLE	United States	
	WOL	Wings Aviation	WINGJET	Guyana	
	WEX	Wings Express	WINGS EXPRESS	United States	
	WLB	Wings of Lebanon Aviation	WING LEBANON	Lebanon	
	WIN	Winlink	WINLINK	Saint Lucia	
	WAG	Wisconsin Air National Guard		United States	
	WSM	Wisman Aviation	WISMAN	United States	
8Z	WVL	Wizz Air Bulgaria	WIZZBUL	Bulgaria	defunct in 2011
W6	WZZ	Wizz Air	WIZZAIR	Hungary	
W4	WMT	Wizz Air Malta	WIZZ AIR MALTA	Malta	
W9	WUK	Wizz Air UK	WIZZ GO	United Kingdom	
	WNR	Wondair on Demand Aviation	WONDAIR	Spain	
	CWY	Woodgate Aviation	CAUSEWAY	United Kingdom	
WO	WOA	World Airways	WORLD	United States	
	XWW	World Weatherwatch		Canada	
	WWM	World Wing Aviation	MANAS WING	Kyrgyzstan	
1P		Worldspan		United States	
UI	CSW	SW Italia	SILKITALIA	Italy	
	WWS	Worldwide Aviation Services		Pakistan	
	WWI	Worldwide Jet Charter	WORLDWIDE	United States	
WW	WOW	WOW air	WOW air	Iceland	
	WRT	Wright Airlines	WRIGHT-AIR	United States	defunct
8V	WRF	Wright Air Service	WRIGHT FLYER	United States	
	CWU	Wuhan Airlines	WUHAN AIR	China	
	WYC	Wycombe Air Centre	WYCOMBE	United Kingdom	
	WYG	Wyoming Airlines	WYOMING	United States	
KW	WAN	Wataniya Airways	WATANIYA	Kuwait	
3W*	VNR	Wan Air	WANAIR	French Polynesia	defunct
WR	WEN	WestJet Encore	ENCORE	Canada	
WJ	JES	JetSmart Argentina	SMARTBIRD	Argentina	

== IATA Traffic Conference Areas ==
The International Air Transport Association (IATA) divides the world into three areas called the Traffic Conference Areas (TCAs) for air travel purposes. These areas are used to define geographical boundaries for fare construction and other industry-related practices:

- Traffic Conference Area 1 (TC1) – this area includes the Americas, encompassing North America (the Caribbean, Central America, and Northern America) and South America.
- Traffic Conference Area 2 (TC2) – this area includes the EMEA region, encompassing Europe, the Middle East, and Africa (North Africa and Sub-Saharan Africa).
- Traffic Conference Area 3 (TC3) – this area includes the Asia–Pacific region, encompassing the rest of Asia (Central Asia, East Asia, North Asia, South Asia, and Southeast Asia) and Oceania.

Essentially, TC1 covers the "New World", while TC2 and TC3 together cover the "Old World" (Africa-Eurasia) and the "Land Down Under".

== See also ==
- IATA airport code
- ICAO airport code
