= Wizz Air Malta =

Low-cost airline of Malta

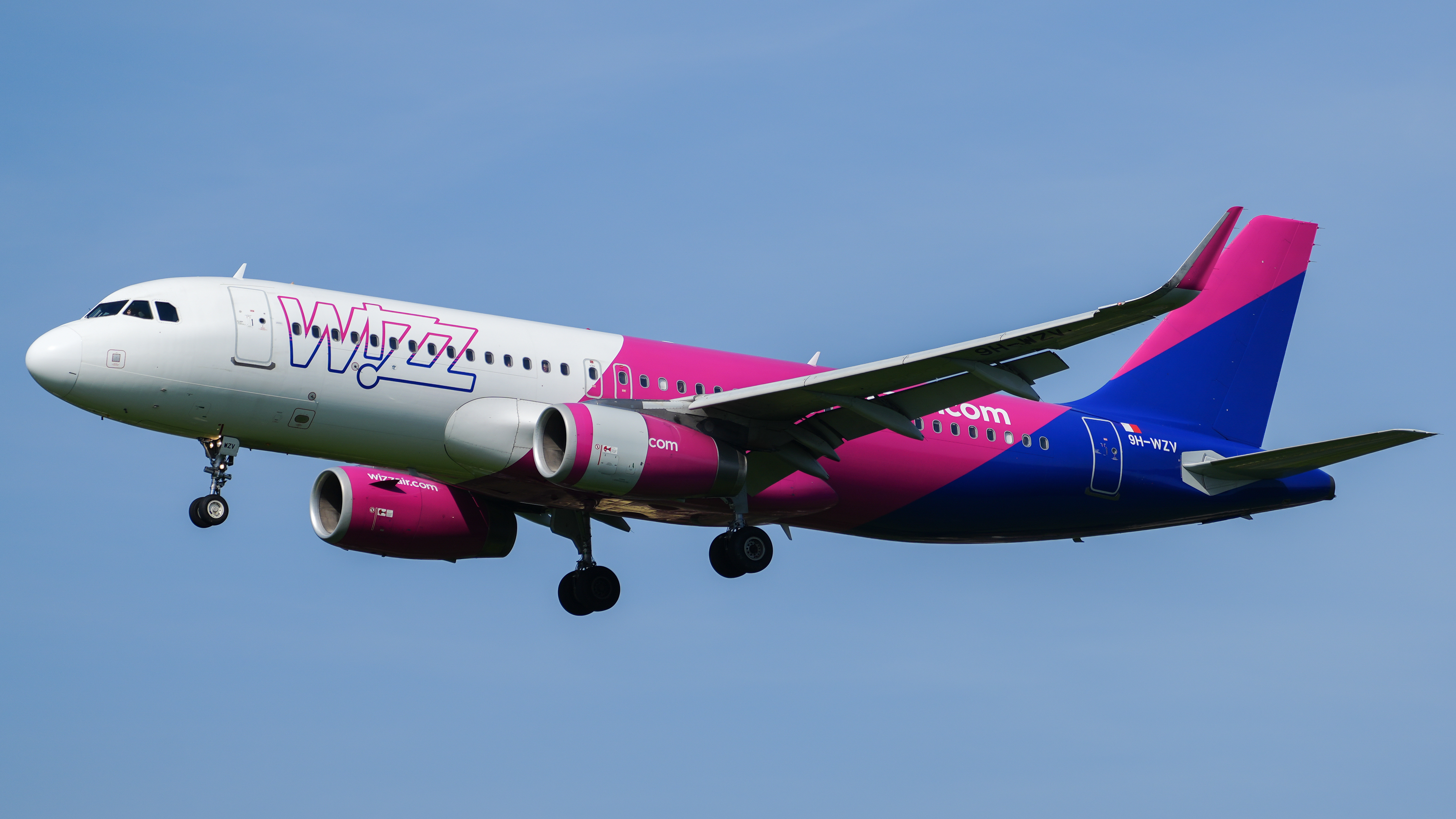
- Wizz Air Malta Airbus A320
IATA	ICAO	Call sign
W4	WMT	WIZZ MALTA
- Founded: 2022; 4 years ago
- Commenced operations: 27 September 2022; 4 years ago
- AOC #: EASA.AOC.003
- Operating bases: List of bases: Brașov (begins 18 December 2026); Bucharest–Băneasa; Bucharest–Otopeni; Catania; Chișinău; Cluj-Napoca; Craiova; Iași; Madrid; Milan–Malpensa; Naples; Palermo; Rome–Fiumicino; Santiago de Compostela (begins 1 February 2027); Sibiu; Suceava; Târgu Mureş; Timișoara; Tirana; Turin; Valencia; Venice
- Frequent-flyer program: WIZZ Discount Club
- Fleet size: 127
- Destinations: 136
- Parent company: Wizz Air Holdings plc
- Key people: Mauro Peneda (Managing Director)
- Website: www.wizzair.com

Wizz Air Malta is the Maltese subsidiary low-cost airline and a subsidiary of the Hungarian low-cost airline group Wizz Air Holdings.

== History ==
The company's AOC was issued by the European Union Aviation Safety Agency (EASA) and its Operating Licence by the Malta Civil Aviation Directorate. It operated its first flight on 27 September 2022 from Rome–Fiumicino to Malta International Airport. It is flying with Maltese-registered aircraft, following in the footsteps of Wizz’s other subsidiaries in Abu Dhabi and the United Kingdom.

The first aircraft in the Airline's fleet was an Airbus A321neo with the registration: 9H-WAM. The aircraft first was delivered to Wizz Air Hungary in May 2021 and was formerly registered as HA-LVS. Wizz Air plans to place up to 90 aircraft with its new Maltese entity by the summer of 2024, which will either be new deliveries or reregistered Wizz Air Hungary aircraft.

On 15 August 2022, the company named former Ryanair executive Diarmuid Ó Conghaile to be its managing director starting from 1 November 2022.

== Destinations ==
As of December 2023, Wizz Air uses the Maltese AOC on flights throughout Europe, Morocco, South Caucasus and the Middle East.

== Fleet ==
=== Current fleet ===
As of July 2026, Wizz Air Malta operates the following aircraft:

Wizz Air Malta fleet
Aircraft	In service	Orders	Passengers
Airbus A320-200	10	—	180
Airbus A320-200	10	—	186
Airbus A320neo	6	—	186
Airbus A321	4	—	
Airbus A321neo	107	—	239
Total	127	—	

=== Former fleet ===
As of September 2025, Wizz Air Malta operated 13 Airbus A320, 6 Airbus A320neo and 93 Airbus A321neo.

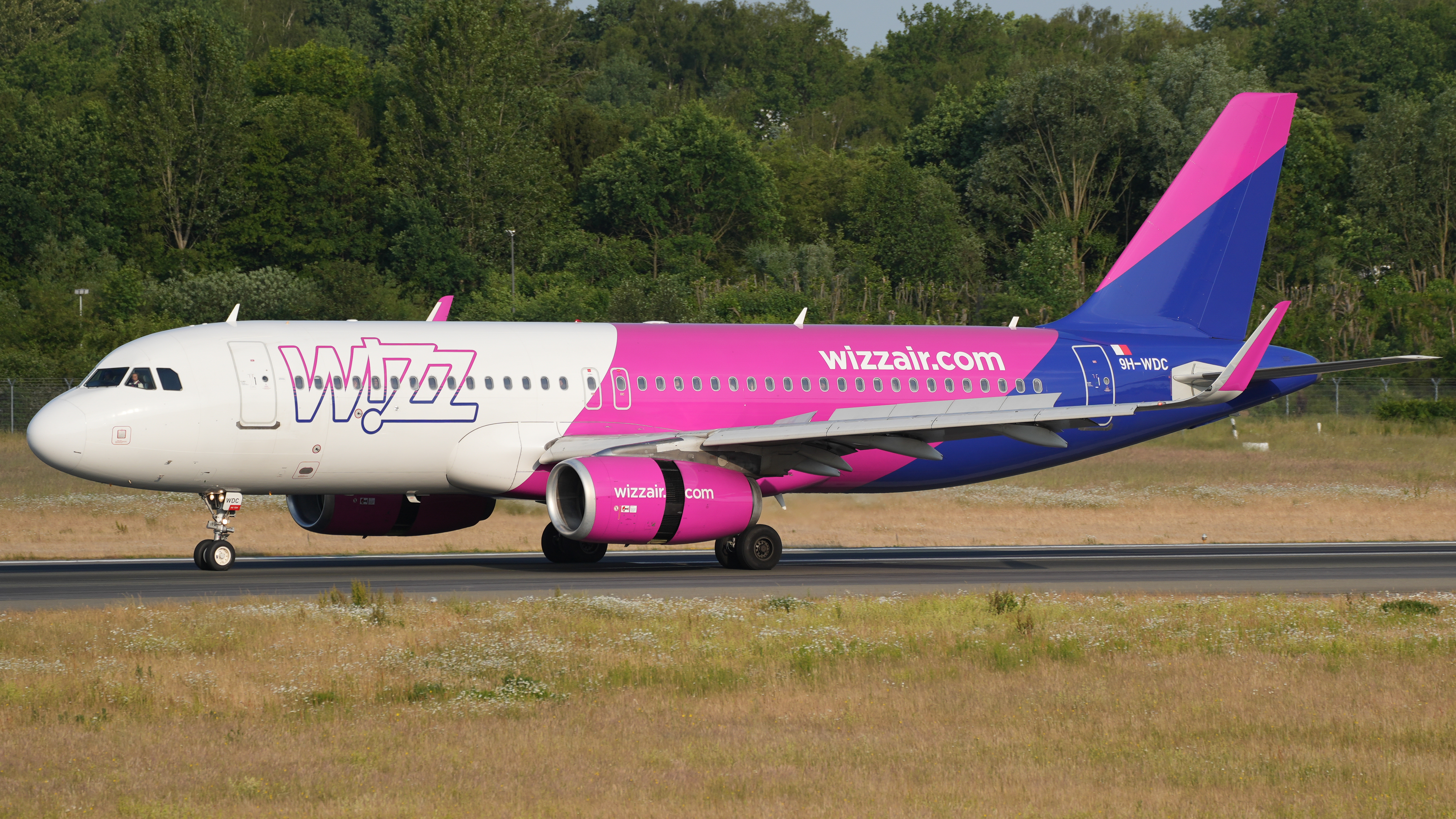
Airbus A320-200

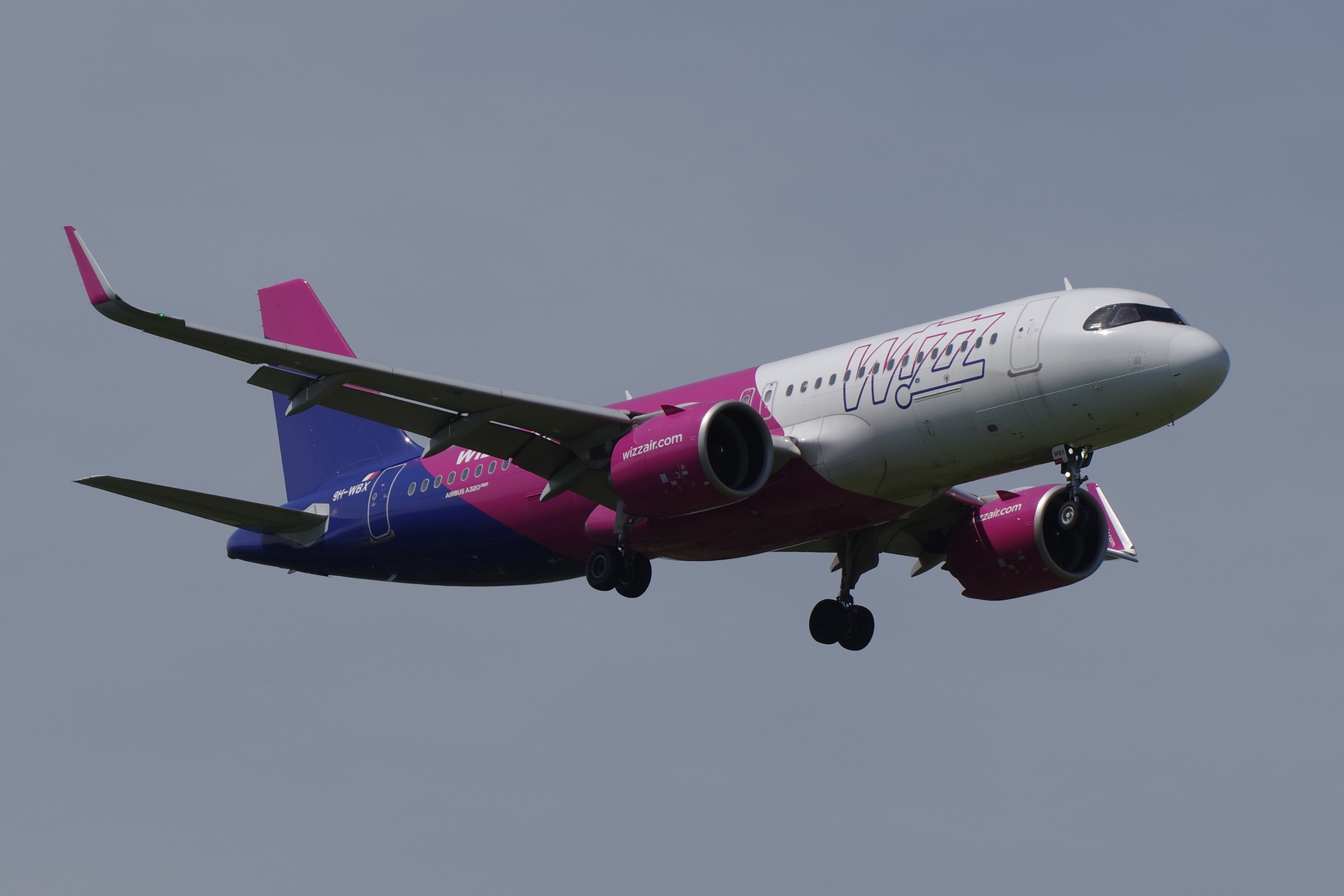
Airbus A320neo

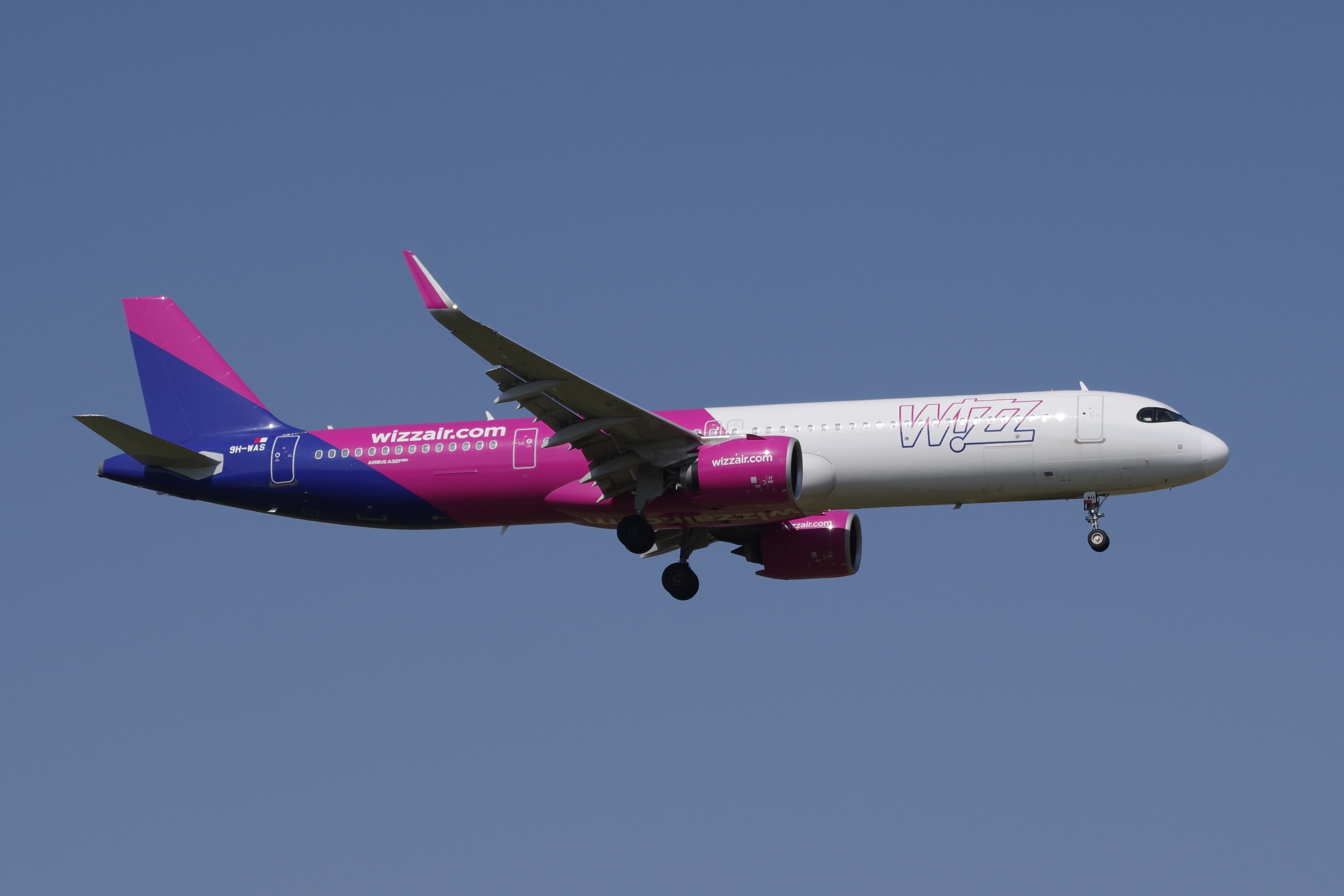
Airbus A321neo
