= Wind spirit =

Wind spirit or spirit of the wind may refer to:

- A wind elemental
- A wind deity

== Arts and entertainment ==
- Spirit of the Wind, a 1979 American film
- Spirit of the Wind (novel), a 1998 novel by Chris Pierson

== Other uses ==
- Wind Spirit (ship), a motor sailing yacht
- Wind Spirit Air, an American airline (see List of airline codes (W) § Codes)

== See also ==
- Ekendriya, beings in Jainism sometimes said to be spirits of the wind
- Kamikaze, the name of a Japanese Special Attack Unit meaning "spirit wind"
- Spirit Wind, a 1997 album by David Arkenstone
