= Wizz Air Ukraine =

Low-cost airline of Ukraine (2008–2015)

IATA	ICAO	Call sign
WU	WAU	WIZZAIR UKRAINE
- Founded: 11 July 2008
- Ceased operations: 20 April 2015
- Operating bases: Kyiv–Zhuliany; Lviv
- Parent company: Wizz Air
- Headquarters: Kyiv, Ukraine
- Website: www.wizzair.com

Wizz Air Ukraine (Ukrainian: Товариство з обмеженою відповідальністю „Авіалінії Візз Ейр Україна”) was the Ukrainian division of the Hungarian Wizz Air based at Kyiv Zhuliany International Airport with additional minor operations out of Lviv Danylo Halytskyi International Airport. It ceased operations by 20 April 2015.

== History ==
Wizz Air Ukraine commenced domestic operations in Ukraine on 11 July 2008 and later added international flights. Domestic operations were later discontinued.

In October 2013, the airline opened its second base at Donetsk International Airport by deploying one aircraft and opening six new routes. However, the Donetsk base was closed by April 2014 due to the war in Donbas.

On 26 March 2015, it was announced that Wizz Air Ukraine would shut down by 20 April 2015 due to the Russo-Ukrainian war. Eight routes from Kyiv - half of them to Germany - were taken over by the parent company, Wizz Air, while the remaining ten routes from Kyiv and Lviv to destinations in Italy, Spain, Russia and Georgia currently operated by Wizz Air Ukraine ceased entirely. All of Wizz Air Ukraine's Airbus A320-200s were taken over by Wizz Air Hungary.

== Fleet ==
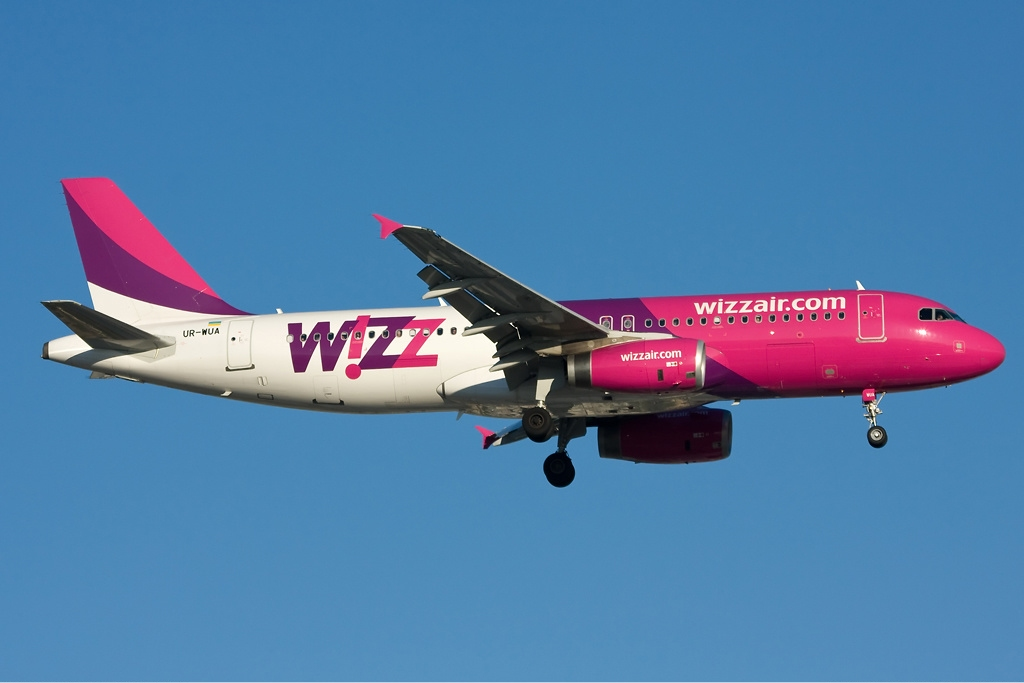
Wizz Air Ukraine Airbus A320-200

The Wizz Air Ukraine fleet consisted of the following aircraft as of April 2015:

Wizz Air Ukraine fleet
Aircraft	In service	Orders	Passengers	Notes
Airbus A320-200	4	—	180	
Total	4	—		
