= József Váradi =

Hungarian businessman

- Born: 21 September 1965 (age 61); Debrecen, Hungary
- Education: Budapest University of Economic Sciences; University of London; INSEAD
- Known for: Co-founder and CEO, Wizz Air
- Spouse: Kinga Bóta

József János Váradi (born 21 September 1965) is a Hungarian businessman, who co-founded Wizz Air and has been its chief executive officer (CEO) since 2003.

== Early life ==
Váradi was born in Debrecen, Hungary in 1965. His father took part in the 1956 Hungarian Revolution, for which he was subsequently jailed. After release from prison he drifted from job to job to provide for his family.

Váradi moved to Budapest when 18 and earned a degree in economics from Budapest University of Economic Sciences in 1989. He completed an LLM from the University of London in 2014. Váradi also holds an international directorship degree from INSEAD.

== Career ==
From 2001 to 2003 he was CEO of the struggling Hungarian state-owned airline Malév Hungarian Airlines.

Váradi was removed from office by the Medgyessy government in 2003, and later that year founded Wizz Air, the largest low-cost airline in Central and Eastern Europe, with five businessmen. Since the founding of Wizz Air, as its chief executive officer (CEO), Váradi's life has been completely intertwined with that of the airline.

Wizz Air is headquartered in Budapest. In 2018, it was the largest airline in Central and Eastern Europe, carrying over 34 million passengers per year. It had a fleet of 105 aircraft.

Váradi told Italian daily newspaper La Repubblica in January 2018 that he was interested in Italy's struggling carrier Alitalia, but only regarding short and medium-haul routes.

After meeting with UK Prime Minister Theresa May to discuss aviation concerns regarding the Brexit, in November 2019, Váradi said that Brexit would not have a significant impact on aviation, with London remaining the largest air travel market in the world.

In the second half of 2019, environmental protection concerns about flying, embodied in the "flight shame" movement, have been dismissed by Váradi as saying that Wizz Air is the greenest airline. This is based on the per-passenger emission level, adding that it will reduce emissions per capita by an additional 30 percent by 2030. At the same time, he has condemned inefficient airlines -such as Lufthansa- offering business class and using outdated technologies, which cause far more specific environmental damage than Wizz Air.

In July 2021, Wizz Air made a bonus offer of £100 million (around 42 billion forints) to Váradi, which would be paid if the company's share value could be increased from the current level of around £45 to £120 within five years. The bonus is also conditional on achieving a compound annual growth rate of 20%. If the growth rate is only between 10 and 20 per cent, the CEO could receive a bonus of between £20 million and £100 million.

== Other positions ==
Váradi was one of the board of directors at Wizz Air Holdings Plc. and Wizz Air Hungary Airlines Ltd in 2019. Previously he was employed as a commissioner by PT Mandala Airlines, a member of the supervisory board at Lufthansa Technik Budapest Kft, a chief executive officer at Malév Hungarian Airlines Zrt and a sales director in charge of global customers at Procter & Gamble Ltd.

Váradi was the 55th richest man in Hungary, with an estimated wealth of 42 billion HUF in 2023.

Váradi is the owner of Juliet Victor Winery in Hungary, which he founded in 2015. His son, Mark Varadi is the managing director since February 2023.

== Personal life ==
Váradi is married to Kinga Bóta.
