= Wiking Helikopter Service =

German helicopter operator

IATA	ICAO	Call sign
—	WHS	WEEKING
- Founded: 1975
- Ceased operations: 2022
- Fleet size: 7
- Headquarters: Wilhelmshaven, Germany

Wiking Helikopter Service GmbH was a German helicopter operator, specialising in offshore helicopter transportation across the North Sea and Baltic Sea.

== Overview ==
Wiking Helikopter Service was specialised in offshore winching operations for transferring passengers and personnel to vessels and offshore wind turbines.

Since its founding in 1975, Wiking had been providing services to the maritime pilot association “Lotsenbrüderschaft Weser und Jade” in the German Bight.

The company also operated as a Customer Support Centre for Airbus Helicopters and Leonardo Helicopters, offering maintenance services for the Leonardo AW139 and Airbus H145 helicopters across Europe.

In October 2022, Wiking filed for bankruptcy and was partially acquired by the German helicopter operator Northern Helicopter (NHC).

== Fleet ==
As of June 2022, WIKING Helikopter Service operated the following helicopters:

- 3 Leonardo AW139
- 4 Airbus Helicopters H145
