= Wizz Air Bulgaria =

Low-cost airline of Bulgaria (2005–2011)

IATA	ICAO	Call sign
8Z	WVL	WIZZAIR BULGARIA
- Founded: 2005
- Ceased operations: 2011 (merged into Wizz Air Hungary)
- Operating bases: Sofia Airport
- Parent company: Wizz Air (until 2011)
- Headquarters: Sofia, Bulgaria
- Website: www.wizzair.com

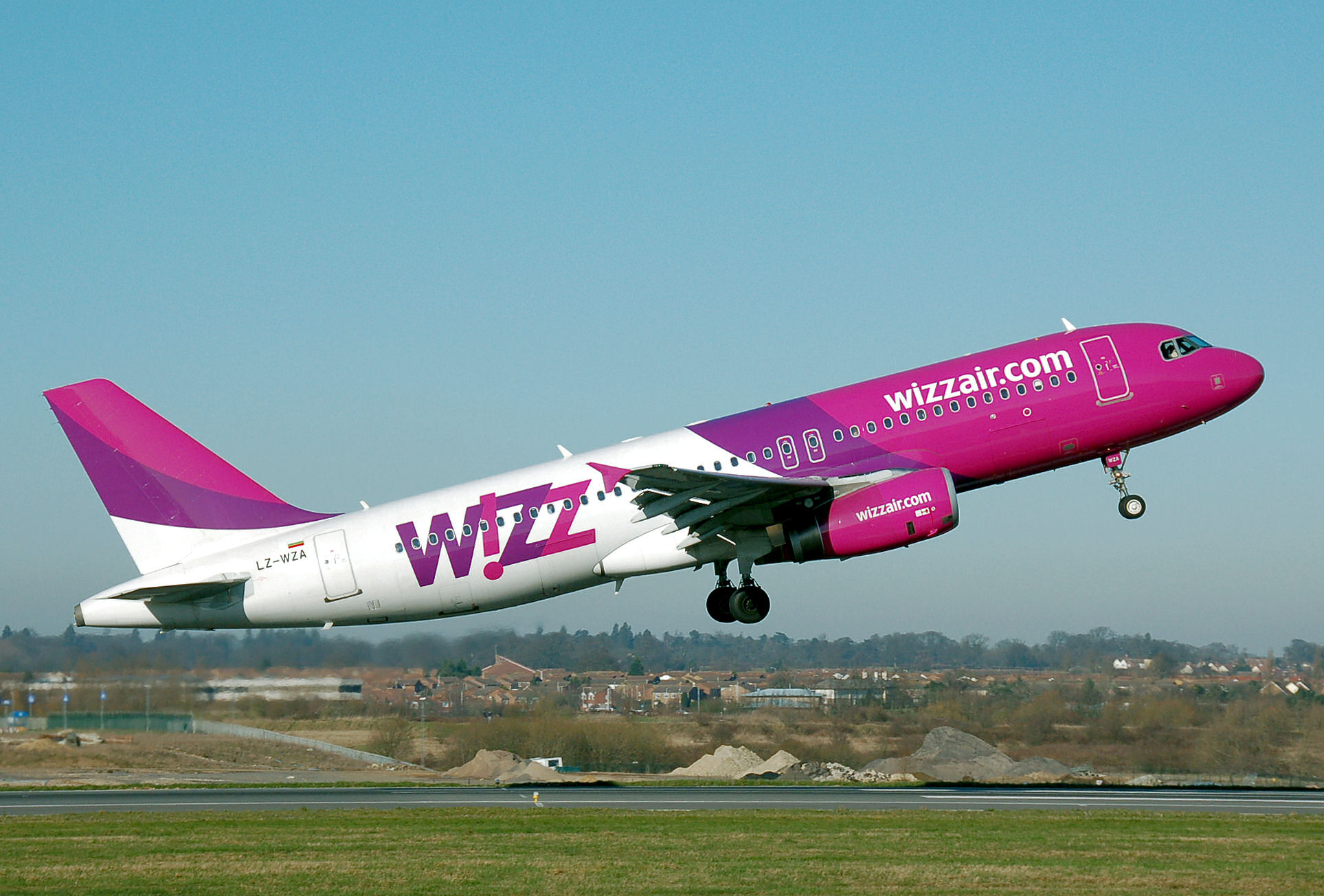
An Airbus A320-200 taking off from London Luton Airport, England

Wizz Air Bulgaria Airlines EAD was the Bulgarian division of Hungarian airline Wizz Air.

== History ==
The Bulgarian company was awarded licenses to begin services to Greece, Turkey and Moldova in 2006 but had already started operating schedules in December 2005. The air carrier operated flights from Sofia to Barcelona, Valencia, Milan, Brussels and increased the number of flights to London/Luton, Rome/Fiumicino/Ciampino and Dortmund by commissioning a third Airbus A320 to serve the new routes.

For operational reasons, in March 2011, the airline merged back into the parent company Wizz Air Hungary which took over all the services.

== Fleet ==
As of May 2010, Wizz Air Bulgaria operated three Airbus A320-200 aircraft. These were removed from the Bulgarian aircraft register in July 2011.
