= Wizz Air =

Hungarian ultra-low-cost airline

Wizz Air Holdings Plc.

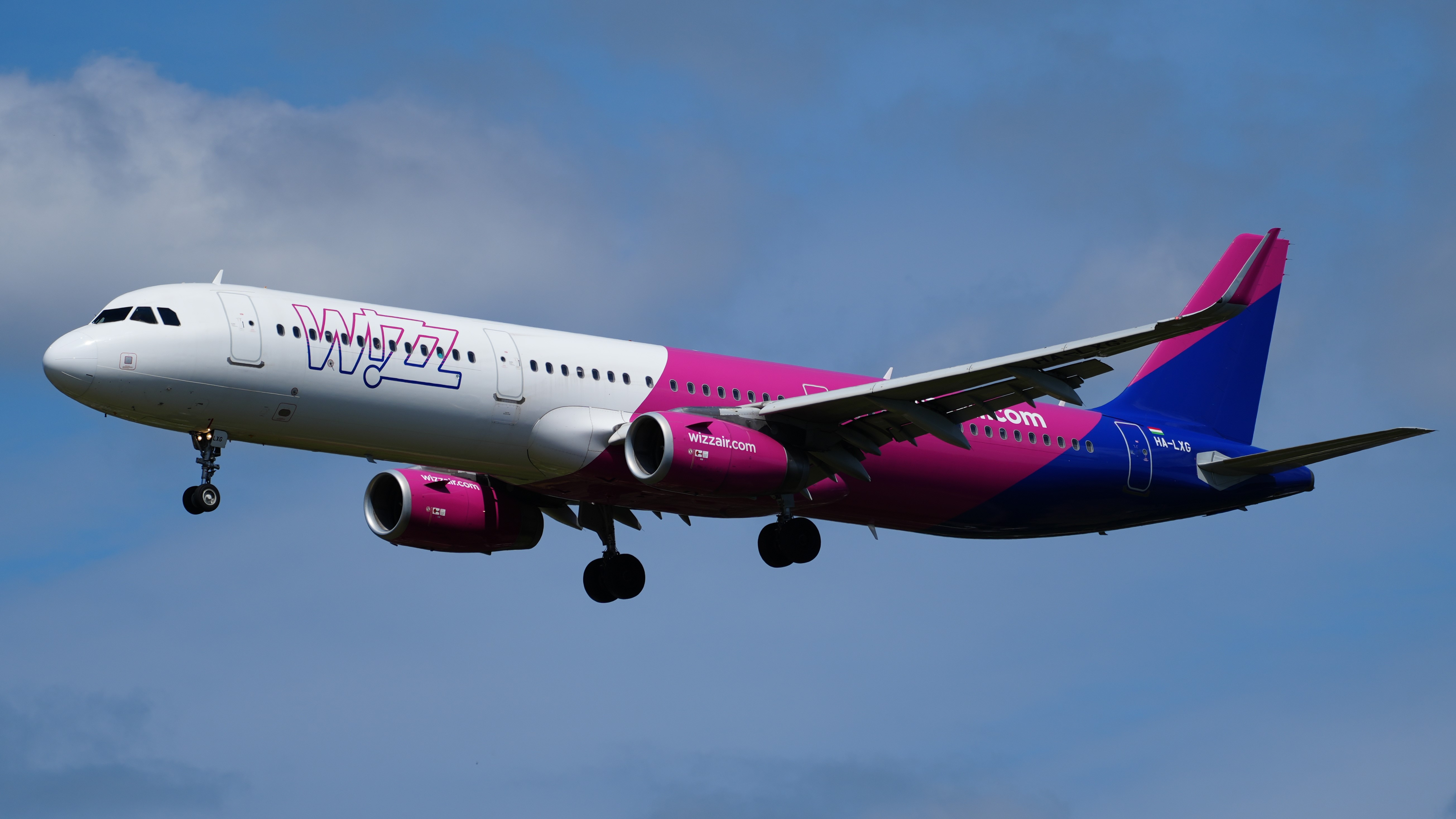
- Wizz Air Airbus A321-200
IATA	ICAO	Call sign
W6 (Note: Wizz Air Malta uses IATA code W4 and Wizz Air UK uses W9.)	WZZ (Note: Wizz Air Malta uses ICAO code WMT and Wizz Air UK uses WUK.)	WIZZ AIR (Note: Wizz Air Malta uses callsign WIZZ MALTA and Wizz Air UK uses WIZZ GO.)
- Founded: September 2003; 23 years ago
- Commenced operations: 19 May 2004; 22 years ago
- AOC #: EASA.AOC.001
- Operating bases: List of bases: Belgrade; Brașov (begins 18 December 2026); Bratislava; Bucharest–Băneasa; Bucharest–Otopeni; Budapest; Catania; Chișinău; Cluj-Napoca; Craiova; Gdańsk; Iași; Katowice; Kraków; Kutaisi; Larnaca; London–Gatwick; London–Luton; Madrid; Milan–Malpensa; Naples; Palermo; Podgorica; Pristina (begins 16 November 2026); Rome–Fiumicino; Santiago de Compostela (begins 1 February 2027); Sibiu; Skopje; Sofia; Suceava; Târgu Mureş; Timișoara; Tirana; Turin; Tuzla; Valencia; Varna; Venice; Vilnius; Warsaw–Chopin; Warsaw–Modlin; Wrocław; Yerevan
- Frequent-flyer program: Wizz All You Can Fly; Wizz Discount Club; Wizz Privilege Pass; Wizz MultiPass
- Subsidiaries: Wizz Air Hungary; Wizz Air Malta; Wizz Air UK
- Fleet size: 118
- Destinations: 194
- Traded as: LSE: WIZZ; FTSE 250 component
- Headquarters: Budapest, Hungary (operational); Saint Helier, Jersey (incorporated)
- Key people: William A. Franke (chairman); József Váradi (CEO)
- Revenue: ▲€5,691.4 million (2026)
- Operating income: ▼€139.7 million (2026)
- Net income: ▼€1.3 million (2026)
- Employees: c. 10,000 (2026)
- Website: wizzair.com

Wizz Air, legally incorporated as Wizz Air Holdings plc (stylized as W!ZZ), is a Hungarian ultra-low-cost airline group headquartered in Budapest, Hungary. Founded in 2003 by its current CEO, József Váradi, the company operates an exclusive Airbus fleet and is the world's largest operator of the Airbus A321neo aircraft. The group serves numerous cities across Europe, as well as destinations in North Africa and the Middle East, carrying over 68 million passengers in 2025, making it the third-largest low-cost carrier in Europe behind Ryanair and easyJet.

As of 2026, Wizz Air maintains its largest bases at Budapest Ferenc Liszt International Airport, Bucharest Henri Coandă International Airport, and London Luton Airport, flying to a total of 194 airports in 46 countries. The company operates through subsidiaries Wizz Air Hungary, Wizz Air Malta, and Wizz Air UK. Registered in Jersey, the corporate parent is listed on the London Stock Exchange and is a constituent of the FTSE 250 Index.

== History ==
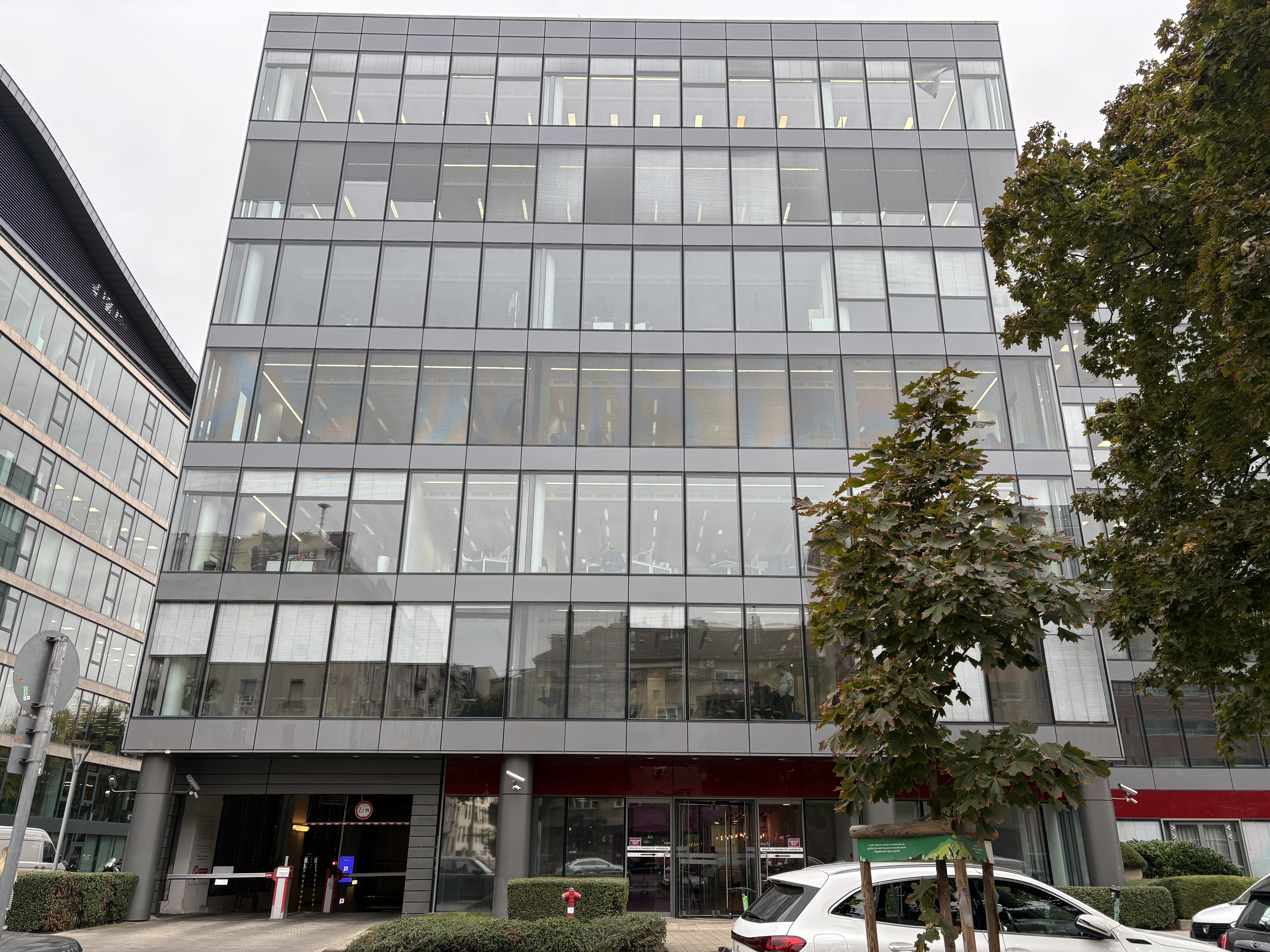
Wizz Air's headquarters in Ferencvaros, Budapest

Former Wizz Air logo

=== Foundation and early years ===
Wizz Air Hungary was established in September 2003. The founder, József Váradi, was previously CEO of struggling Hungarian state-owned airline Malév Hungarian Airlines, until he was removed from office by the Medgyessy government in 2003. The lead investor is Indigo Partners, an American private equity firm specialising in transportation investments. The first flight was made from Katowice International Airport on 19 May 2004.

On 25 February 2015, Wizz Air shares began trading on the London Stock Exchange.

In November 2017, Wizz Air announced its planned launch of a British division called Wizz Air UK, based at Luton Airport mainly to take advantage of landing slots acquired when Monarch Airlines entered administration that year. The airline applied successfully to the CAA for an AOC and a Type A Operating Licence. The airline launched operations in March 2018 using British registered aircraft. Wizz Air UK was to start taking over UK-bound flights previously operated by Wizz Air, and plans called for the airline to employ up to 100 staff by the end of 2018.

In November 2019, Wizz Air dismissed concerns about its part in environmental damage raised by the "flight shame" movement, basing its response on the airline's per-passenger emission level. The company said it would reduce per capita emissions by an additional 30 percent by 2030. Wizz Air also condemned inefficient airlines such as Lufthansa that offered business class and used outdated technologies, which according to Wizz Air cause far more environmental damage.

=== Development since 2020 ===
By early 2020, the COVID-19 pandemic forced Wizz Air to ground its fleet. One-fifth of the staff were dismissed when it became clear that air travel across the continent was shutting down. In April 2020, Wizz Air became Europe's largest low-cost airline with 78,000 passengers. By June, they had reached 40 percent of their previous year's normal weekly revenue, while the proportion of no-shows fell from 80 percent in April to 30 percent. In July 2020, the airline announced that it would form a joint venture with the Abu Dhabi Developmental Holding Company. In October 2020, Wizz took delivery of an A330-200F cargo aircraft (HA-LHU, formerly Qatar Cargo), operating it on behalf of the Hungarian Government as 'Hungary Air Cargo'.

In August 2021, company management announced that they plan to hire 4,600 new pilots by 2030, with the first part of their plan to train and hire nearly 500 pilots by the end of 2021. In September 2021, rival low-cost carrier EasyJet claimed it had rejected a takeover offer from Wizz Air. On 14 November 2021, on the first day of the Dubai Airshow, Wizz Air was one of four airlines that ordered additional A321neo jets. Wizz Air is due to receive a total of 75 A321neo and 27 A321XLRs, adding up to 102 new aircraft.

Following the 2022 Russian invasion of Ukraine, four Wizz Air aircraft were stranded in Ukraine, three in Kyiv, and one in Lviv (the latter eventually being recovered and returned to service). In March 2022, amid the invasion, Wizz Air provided 100,000 free airline tickets to refugees for short-distance flights from Poland, Slovakia, Hungary and Romania. In May 2022, Wizz Air said it had signed a memorandum of understanding with Saudi Arabia's Ministry of Investment to collaborate on potential investment and operating models to boost the country's tourism industry and increase its connectivity. On 8 June 2022, the company signed a memorandum of understanding with European aircraft manufacturer Airbus to work on the development of hydrogen-powered aircraft.

In 2024 the company was named as the worst for flight delays in the United Kingdom for the third year in succession. On average flights departed over half an hour late. In 2024, Wizz Air had to ground hundred of planes after reported faults with Pratt & Whitney's geared turbofan engines. The chief executive said he expected the issue to affect the fleet for two years while the aircraft are inspected.

In August 2024, the company announced an "all you can fly" subscription, costing €499 per year. The annual subscription sold out within 24 hours. Subscribers are charged an additional £8.90 per flight and have to pay extra for carry-on or checked luggage — only a small personal item is free.

In September 2024, Wizz Air reported progress on the aircraft engine problems. The budget carrier had 41 aircraft grounded as of 30 Sep, six months earlier than it originally forecast. The company now expects to have 40-45 planes idled at a time over the next 18 months, down from the previous expectation of 50.

In September 2025, the company closed down the subsidiary Wizz Air Abu Dhabi, claiming it was caused by geopolitical turmoil, supply chain constraints, and regulatory barriers. Still the airline continues to operate flights between Europe and the United Arab Emirates.

In December 2025, it was announced that Wizz Air had acquired additional airport slots from TUI Airways at London Luton Airport, enabling the basing of a 15th aircraft and the launch of six new routes from summer 2026. The expansion included new services to destinations such as Alicante, Faro, Corfu, Lyon and Turin, as well as the first direct air connection between London and Yerevan.

In March 2026, Wizz Air's Vienna base will close. Around the same time, a new base is expected to open in Tel Aviv, Israel, although no final agreements have been signed.

In early 2026, Wizz Air UK applied to the United States Department of Transportation for authority to operate transatlantic passenger flights between the United Kingdom and the United States. At the time of the application, no specific routes, destinations, or start dates were officially announced.

As of 2026, the airline's fleet had grown to over 250 aircraft, of which approximately 73% were Airbus A320neo family aircraft. For the 2026 financial year, the carrier projected network-wide traffic of 80 million passengers, including 8.3 million on routes operated from Hungary, which were to see a 23% increase in flight frequencies. In connection with the Hungarian expansion, Wizz Air announced plans to add around 300 employees to its workforce in the country.

A portion of the airline's fleet remained grounded due to the ongoing Pratt & Whitney PW1100G geared turbofan engine inspection programme. According to CEO József Váradi, the affected aircraft were expected to return to service by late 2027 or early 2028.

== Corporate affairs ==
=== Business trends ===
The key trends for the Wizz Air Group are (as at 31 March each year):

FY	Revenue (€m)	Net profit (€m)	Number of employees	Number of passengers (m)	Passenger load factor (%)	Number of served airports	Number of served countries	Fleet size	CO2/RPK (Note: CO2 per revenue passenger kilometer) (g)	References
2014	1,011	87.7	1,650	13.9	85.7	96	35	46		
2015	1,227	183	2,040	16.5	86.7	110	38	55		
2016	1,429	192	2,396	20.0	88.2	124	39	67		
2017	1,571	225	3,033	23.8	90.1	141	42	79	61.5	
2018	1,948	275	3,686	29.6	91.3	135	44	93	59.9	
2019	2,327	123	4,261	34.6	93.6	146	44	112	58.5	
2020	2,761	281	4,440	40.0	93.5	155	45	121	57.2	
2021	739	−576	3,960	10.2	64.0	167	48	137	77.3	
2022	1,663	−642	5,772	27.1	78.1	194	51	153	60.7	
2023	3,896	−535	7,389	51.0	87.8	194	54	179	53.8	
2024	5,073	365	8,044	62.0	90.1	193	53	208	52.0	
2025	5,267	213	8,816	63.4	91.2	200	55	231	52.2	
2026	5,691	1.3	c.10,000	69.7	90.7	n/a	n/a	262	50.6	

=== Subsidiaries ===
==== Current subsidiaries ====
- Wizz Air UK was founded on 18 October 2017 as Wizz Air's UK unit. Following CAA approval, the subsidiary commenced operations with 10 registered aircraft initially. The unit operates flights to and from the United Kingdom on behalf of its Hungarian parent. The subsidiary was set up to ensure Wizz Air retained full market access to the United Kingdom after Brexit.
- Wizz Air Malta was founded in 2022 and operated its first flight on 27 September 2022 from Rome Fiumicino to Malta International Airport.

==== Former subsidiaries ====
- Wizz Air Bulgaria was Wizz Air's Bulgarian unit set-up in 2005 and based at Sofia Airport with a fleet of 3 aircraft. It ceased operations on 31 March 2011, all flights merged back into Wizz Air Hungary Ltd.
- Wizz Air Ukraine, founded in 2008, was the Ukrainian unit of Wizz Air, which had its own air operator's certificate and operated from Kyiv Zhuliany International Airport and Lviv International Airport with a fleet of four aircraft. As of October 2016, it operated flights to 13 cities in 7 countries from Kyiv.
- Wizz Air Abu Dhabi was founded on 12 December 2019 as Wizz Air's UAE subsidiary. The airline was a joint venture with state-owned Abu Dhabi Developmental Holding Company, which owned 51 per cent. The company closed down the subsidiary on 1 September 2025.

== Destinations ==
Countries served by Wizz Air as of March 2026

These notable actions regarding destinations were executed by the airline:

Year	Destination	Notability	Refs
2004	Katowice, London Luton	Maiden flight from the first base in Katowice Airport to London Luton Airport	
2004	Budapest	Establishment of second base	
2008	Ukraine	Start of domestic operations in a country outside of the European Union	
2009	Hurghada, Sharm El Sheikh	Airline's first routes to North Africa	
2011	Belgrade	New base outside of the European Union	
2012	Kutaisi	Airline's first route to the South Caucasus	
2012	Skopje	New base outside of the European Union	
2012	Tel Aviv	Airline's first route to the Middle East	
2013	Dubai	Airline's first route to the Arabian Peninsula	
2015	Tuzla	New base outside of the European Union	
2016	Chișinău	New base outside of the European Union	
2016	Kutaisi	Airline's first base in the South Caucasus	
2017	Astana	Airline's first route to Central Asia	
2017	London Luton	New base outside of Central and Eastern Europe	
2018	Vienna	New base outside of Central and Eastern Europe	
2020	Larnaca	New base outside of Central and Eastern Europe	
2020	London Gatwick	New base outside of Central and Eastern Europe	
2020	Milan Malpensa	New base in a country outside of Central and Eastern Europe	
2020	Tirana	New base outside of the European Union	
2021	Abu Dhabi	Airline's first base on the Arabian Peninsula	
2021	Dortmund	Closure of a base outside of Central and Eastern Europe after having been operated for a year	
2021	Norway	Termination of all its domestic routes in a country outside of the European Union, after being operated for less than a year	
2022	Doncaster	Closure of a base outside of Central and Eastern Europe after having been operated for less than two years	
2022	Malé	Airline's first route to South Asia	
2022	Sarajevo	Closure of a base outside of the European Union after having been operated for a year	
2023	Cardiff	Closure of a base outside of Central and Eastern Europe after having been operated for less than a year	
2023	Tuzla	Closure of a base outside of European Union (Balkans)	
2025	Abu Dhabi	Closure of a base outside of Europe after having been operated for four years	
2025	Yerevan	New base outside of the European Union (Caucasus)	
2025	Tuzla	Reopening of a base outside of the European Union (Balkans)	
2026	Podgorica	New base outside of the European Union (Balkans)	
2026	Pristina (begins 16 November 2026)	New base outside of the European Union (Balkans)	

The longest routes by linear distance are:

Route	Linear distance	Max. duration (Note: according to flight schedule) (hours)	Status	Aircraft	References
Katowice – Abu Dhabi	2,269 nm	6:00	active	Airbus A321neo	
London-Gatwick – Medinah	2,428 nm	6:40	active	Airbus A321XLR	
London-Gatwick – Jeddah	2,546 nm	7:00	active	Airbus A321XLR	

== Fleet ==
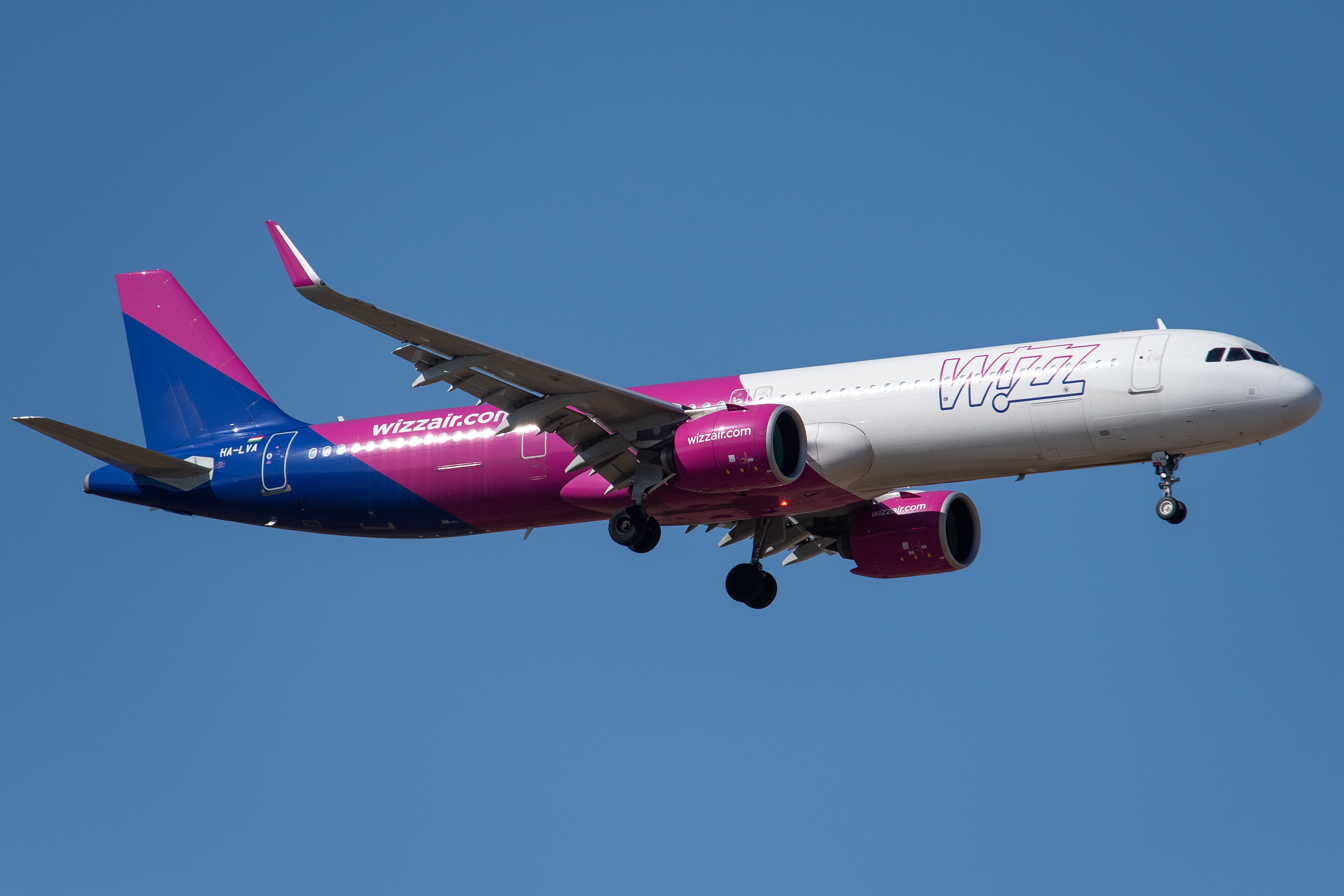
Wizz Air Airbus A321neo

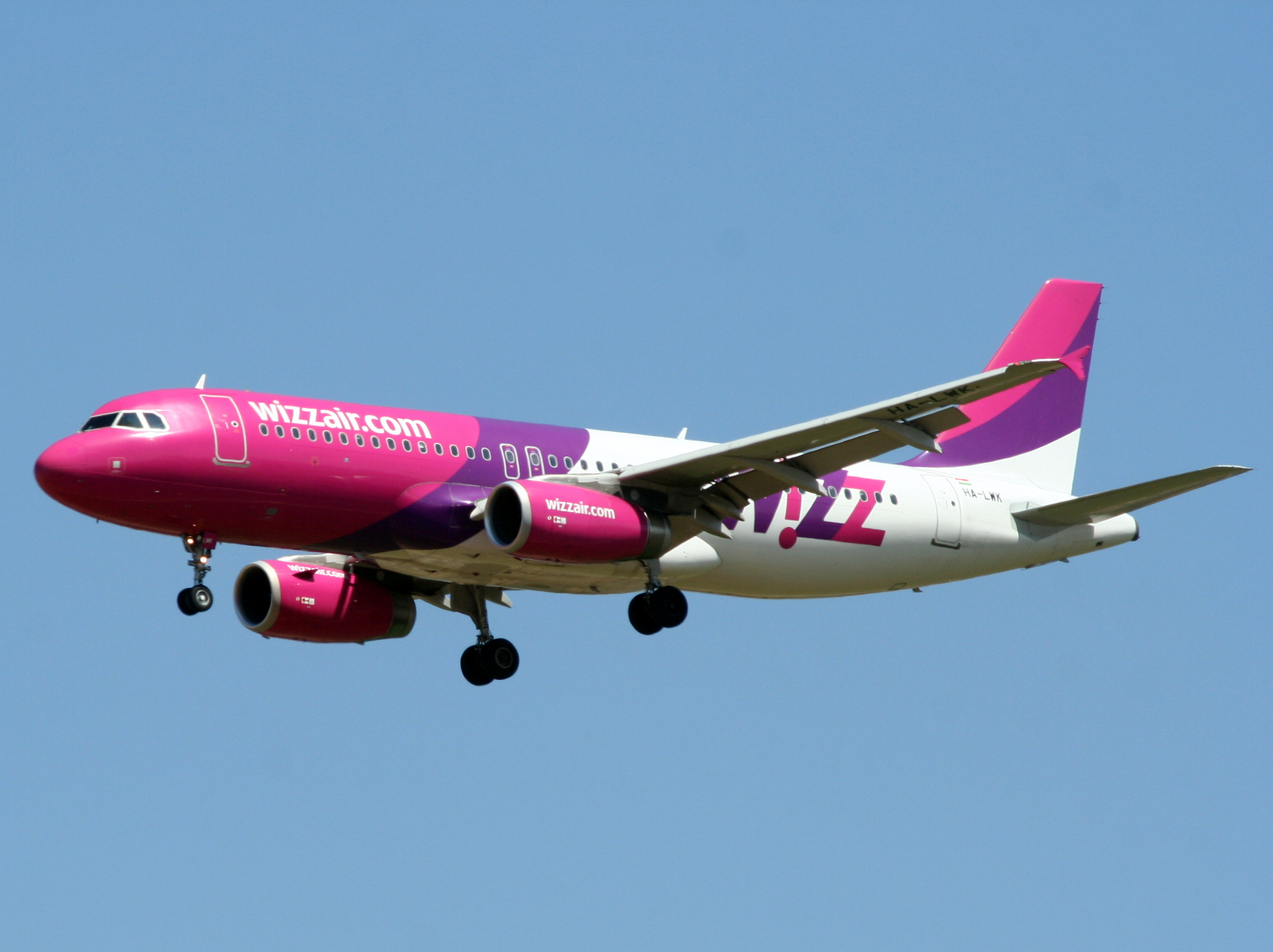
Wizz Air Airbus A320-200 wearing the company's former livery

=== Current fleet ===
As of July 2026, Wizz Air operates the following aircraft: (see also fleets of Wizz Air Malta and Wizz Air UK)

Wizz Air fleet
Aircraft	In service	Orders	Passengers	Notes
Airbus A320-200	12	—	180	Being Phased out
Airbus A320-200	12	—	186	Being Phased out
Airbus A321-200	35	—	230	To be retired by 2029
Airbus A321neo	71	265	239	Second largest operator. Deliveries until 2033.
Total	118	265		

=== Former fleet ===
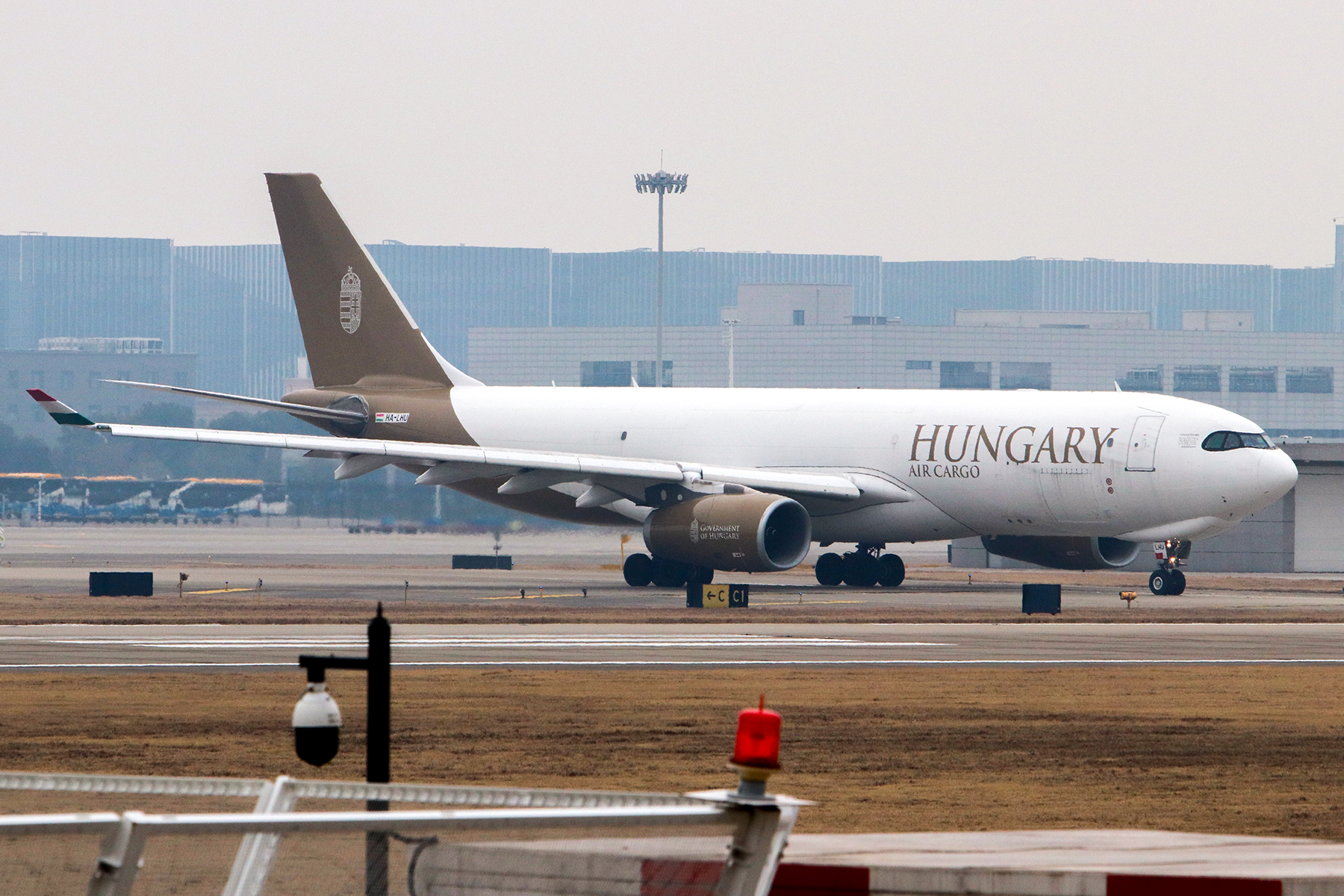
Wizz Air's former Airbus A330-200F operated for Hungary Air Cargo

In December 2024, Wizz Air ended operations of their sole Airbus A330-200F which handled freight services on behalf of the Hungarian government since the COVID-19 pandemic in 2020.

== See also ==
- EasyJet
- Ryanair
