= Lviv Danylo Halytskyi International Airport =

International airport serving Lviv, Ukraine

Lviv Danylo Halytskyi International Airport Міжнародний аеропорт «Львів» імені Данила Галицького

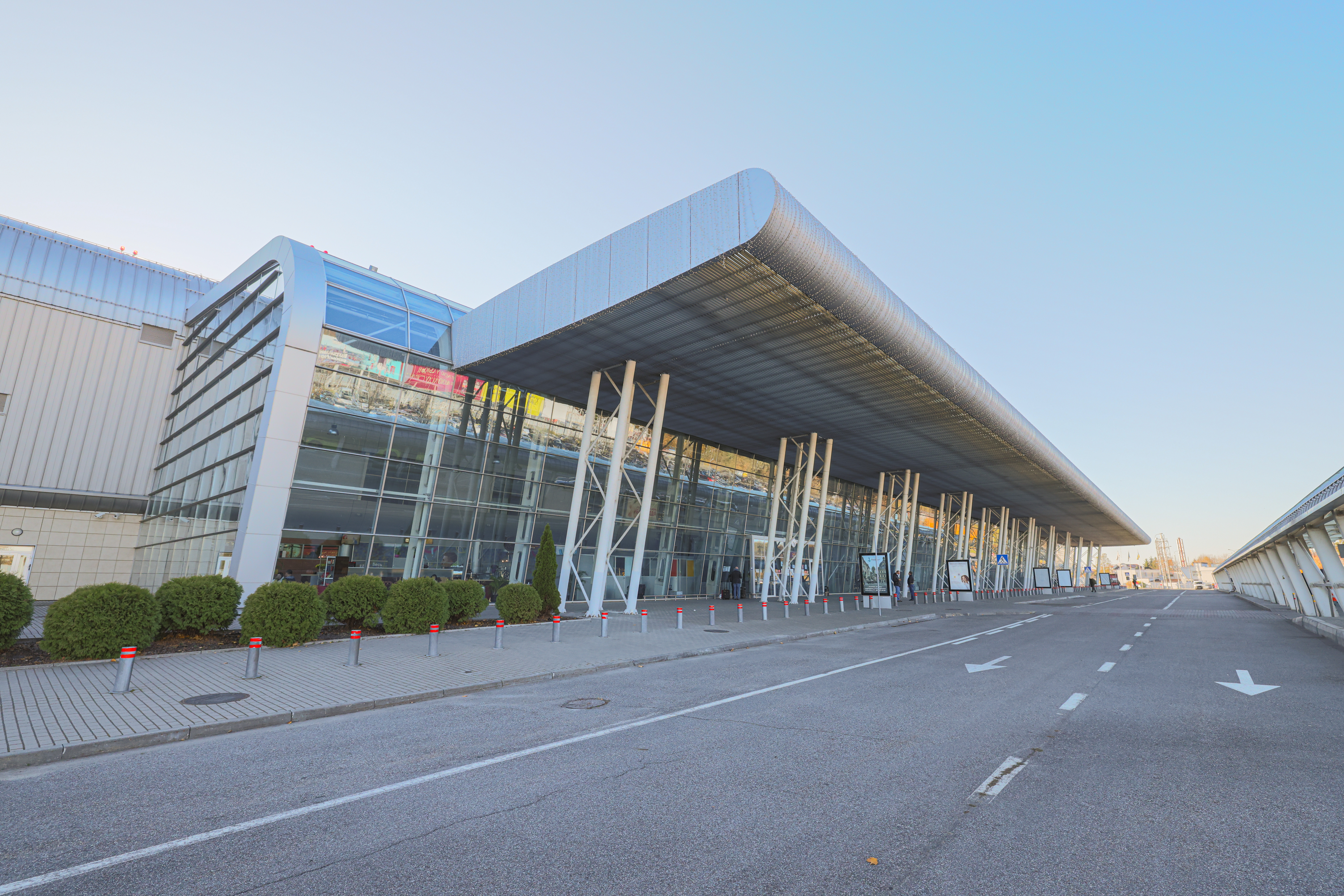
- IATA: LWO; ICAO: UKLL

Summary
- Airport type: Public/military
- Owner: Government of Ukraine
- Operator: State Enterprise “Lviv Danylo Halytskyi International Airport”
- Serves: Lviv
- Location: Lviv, Lviv Oblast, Ukraine
- Hub for: Wizz Air; SkyUp
- Focus city for: Ukraine International Airlines; Wizz Air; LOT Polish Airlines; Ryanair; SkyUp
- Elevation AMSL: 1,071 ft / 326 m
- Coordinates: 49°48′45″N 23°57′22″E
- Website: lwo.aero

Maps
- Location of airport in Ukraine
- Interactive map of Lviv Danylo Halytskyi International Airport

Runways
Direction	Length		Surface
Direction	ft	m	Surface
13/31	10 843	3,305	Concrete

Statistics (2021)
- Passengers: ▲1,834,051
- Cargo (t): ▲2,282
- Aircraft movements: ▲17,444

Lviv Danylo Halytskyi International Airport (Ukrainian: Міжнародний аеропорт «Львів» імені Данила Галицького, romanized: Mizhnarodnyi aeroport "Lviv" imeni Danyla Halytskoho) (IATA: LWO, ICAO: UKLL) is an international airport in Lviv, Ukraine, located 6 kilometres (3.7 mi) from the central city. It is the second largest and busiest airport in Ukraine. Importance of the airport increased gradually following the Russo-Ukrainian War in 2014. The airport is named after King Daniel of Galicia, the historical founder of the city in 1256 AD.

On 24 February 2022, Ukraine closed airspace to civilian flights due to the Russian invasion of Ukraine.

== History ==
=== Early history ===
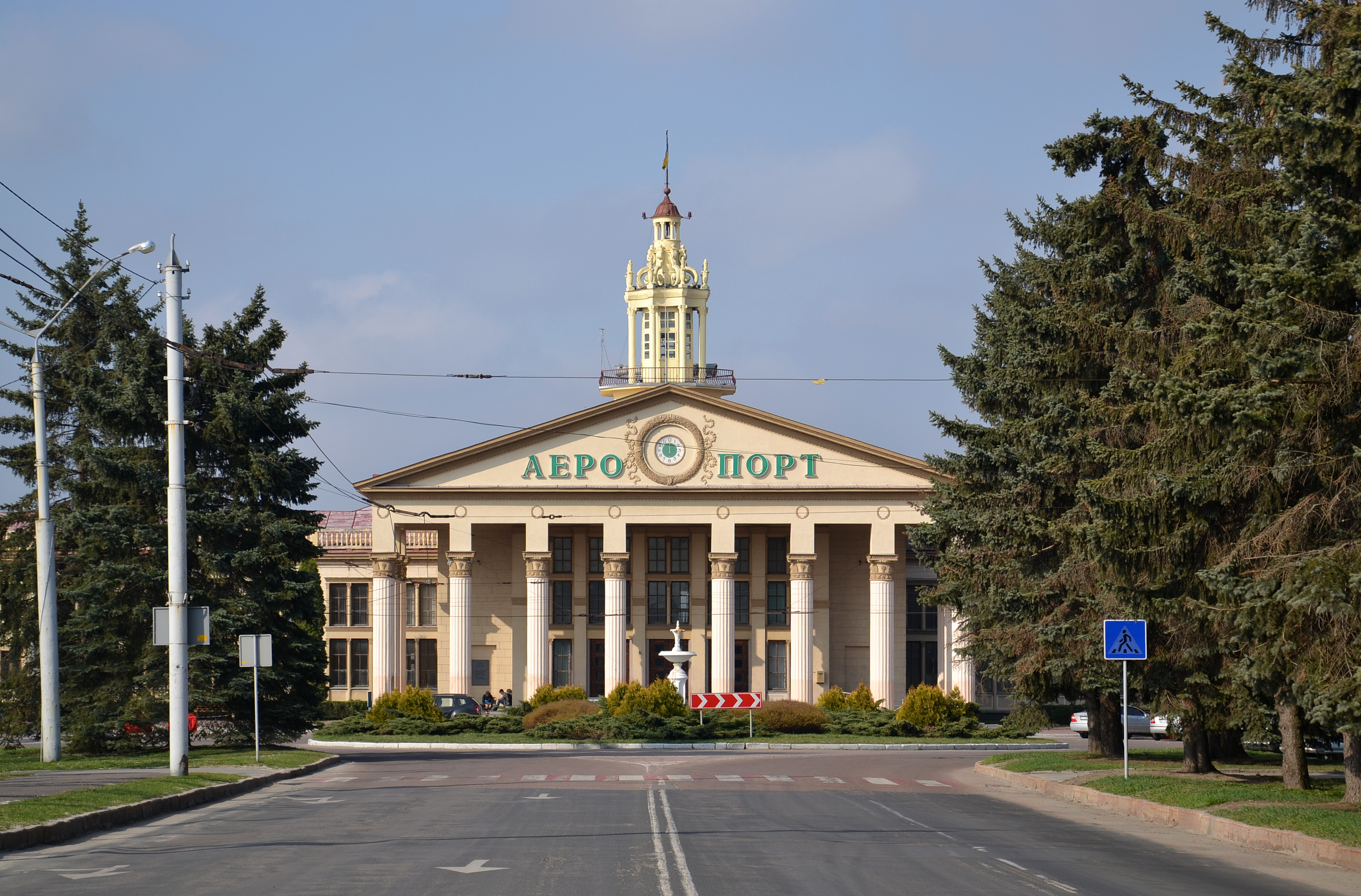
The old terminal

Since 1923, the Polish authorities decided to establish a permanent air base in Skniłów near Lviv with all hangar and logistic facilities for the expanded military aviation, which could no longer fit at the Lewandówka airfield. Skniłów was the name of the neighbouring village which today is part of Lviv. The 6th Aviation Regiment was stationed here from 1925 until World War II.

It was not until 1929, when the Lwów-Skniłów airport was fully functional to meet the needs of the rapidly developing city. It was named after the Polish President Ignacy Mościcki. Beside civilian flights, the airport shared its functions along with military planes as well as the local aeroclub. Before the Second World War, it operated a domestic route to Warsaw and Kraków. In 1930, the international route to Bucharest was launched which was extended in 1931 to Sofia and Thessaloniki. In 1936, the above route was extended to Athens and Lydda.

After the war, the Polish-Soviet border was moved west and Lviv became part of the Ukrainian SSR.

The base was home to the:

- 6th Aviation Regiment of the Polish Military Aviation (1929-1939)
- 243rd Independent Mixed Aviation Regiment of the Soviet Air Forces. (1960-1992)

=== Developments since 2010 ===
In 2010, the airport carried 481,900 passengers. In preparation for Euro 2012, Lviv International Airport has undergone a $200m expansion project. Lviv airport's new terminal building has an area of 34,000m^{2} with a capacity of handling 1,000 passengers an hour. Of the $200m, it was expected that the Ukrainian government would provide $70m, including $14m in 2008, and $130m would come from private investors. The expansion project included a 700-meter extension of the existing runway and a new airport terminal capable of handling up to 2,000 passengers per hour (5.69 million passenger annually).

The airport used to be a focus city for Wizz Air Ukraine, which served four international routes to Italy (Naples, Bergamo, and Treviso) and Germany (Dortmund) until the airline was dissolved April 2015 (by contrast, routes from Kyiv International Airport continued after being taken over by the parent company). In January 2017, Wizz Air announced that it would be resuming flights to Lviv, initially with the introduction of a route to Wroclaw.

In March 2017, Ryanair announced that it would be launching seven routes to Lviv starting October 2017. These plans were scrapped in July after Ryanair's failure to reach an agreement with Boryspil and its subsequent decision to postpone entry into the Ukrainian market. Immediately the Ukrainian government put pressure on Boryspil and accused Ukraine International Airlines in sabotaging the agreement. This resulted in the continuation of talks with Ryanair and as of March 2018, it was announced that Ryanair would go on to open 10 new routes from Boryspil and 5 new routes from Lviv.

== Facilities ==
=== Terminal A ===
The airport has two terminals (1 and A), though only terminal A is currently in operation. Terminal A was opened in 2012. There are 29 check-in desks, of which nine are for domestic flights and the remaining twenty for international flights. It has nine gates, four of them equipped with jetbridges, and can handle up to 3,000 passengers per hour. Facilities at the airport also include four cafés and two duty-free shops, as well as two airport lounges, one in the domestic section and one in the international.

=== Terminal 1 ===
Opened in 1955, this was the airport's sole terminal until 2012, when terminal A was opened. It can handle 300 departing and 220 arriving passengers per hour. There had been tentative plans to use it for VIP passengers in the future. However, in June 2019, the terminal was re-opened for domestic flights, with future plans to move charter flights to the terminal as well.

== Airlines and destinations ==
Regular and charter flights to Lviv before 24 February 2022.

Airlines	Destinations
Air Baltic	Seasonal: Riga
Austrian Airlines	Vienna
Azerbaijan Airlines	Baku
Flynas	Riyadh; Seasonal: Gassim, Jeddah
LOT Polish Airlines	Warsaw–Chopin, Zielona Góra
Lufthansa	Frankfurt
Motor Sich Airlines	Kyiv–Zhuliany
Pegasus Airlines	Istanbul–Sabiha Gökçen; Seasonal: Bodrum, Dalaman
Ryanair	Barcelona, Bari, Bergamo, Bologna, Bratislava, Budapest, Charleroi, Gdańsk, Kaunas, Kraków, London–Stansted, Manchester, Memmingen, Naples, Nuremberg, Palermo, Pisa, Poznań, Riga, Rome–Fiumicino, Stockholm–Arlanda, Treviso, Turin, Warsaw–Modlin, Wrocław, Zagreb; Seasonal: Paphos, Weeze
Skyline Express	Charter: Sharm El Sheikh,Hurghada; Seasonal charter: Antalya, Bodrum, Dalaman, La Romana, Marsa Alam
SkyUp	Istanbul, Lisbon, Madrid, Prague, Tel Aviv, Valencia, Vienna; Seasonal: Alicante, Bahrain, Baku, Barcelona, Batumi, Burgas, Dammam, Kuwait City, Muscat, Rhodes, Riyadh, Tirana, Tivat; Seasonal charter: Antalya, Hurghada, Marsa Alam, Qassim, Sharm El Sheikh
Turkish Airlines	Istanbul
Ukraine International Airlines	Kyiv–Boryspil, Tel Aviv; Charter: Sharm El Sheikh; Seasonal charter: Antalya, Bodrum, Hurghada, Tivat, Rhodes
Windrose Airlines	Kyiv–Boryspil; Seasonal charter: Antalya, Hurghada
Wizz Air	Beauvais, Berlin, Billund, Bratislava, Budapest, Catania, Charleroi, Dortmund, Eindhoven, Gdańsk, Hamburg, Katowice, Larnaca, Lisbon, London–Luton, Madrid, Memmingen, Milan–Malpensa, Naples, Nice, Pardubice, Poznań, Rome–Ciampino, Rome–Fiumicino, Tallinn, Treviso, Valencia, Vilnius, Warsaw–Chopin, Wrocław

== Statistics ==
Year	Passengers	Change
2003	144,100	▲35.8%
2004	198,200	▲35.5%
2005	235,900	▲19.0%
2006	278,200	▲18.0%
2007	427,100	▲52.4%
2008	532,100	▲25.5%
2009	452,300	▼15.0%
2010	481,900	▲6.5%
2011	297,000	▼38.4%
2012	576,000	▲94.0%
2013	700,800	▲21.0%
2014	585,200	▼16.5%
2015	570,570	▼2.5%
2016	738,000	▲29.4%
2017	1,080,000	▲46.3%
2018	1,598,700	▲48.0%
2019	2,217,400	▲38.8%
2020	878,500	▼60.0%
2021	1,834,051	▲108.8%

== Ground transportation ==
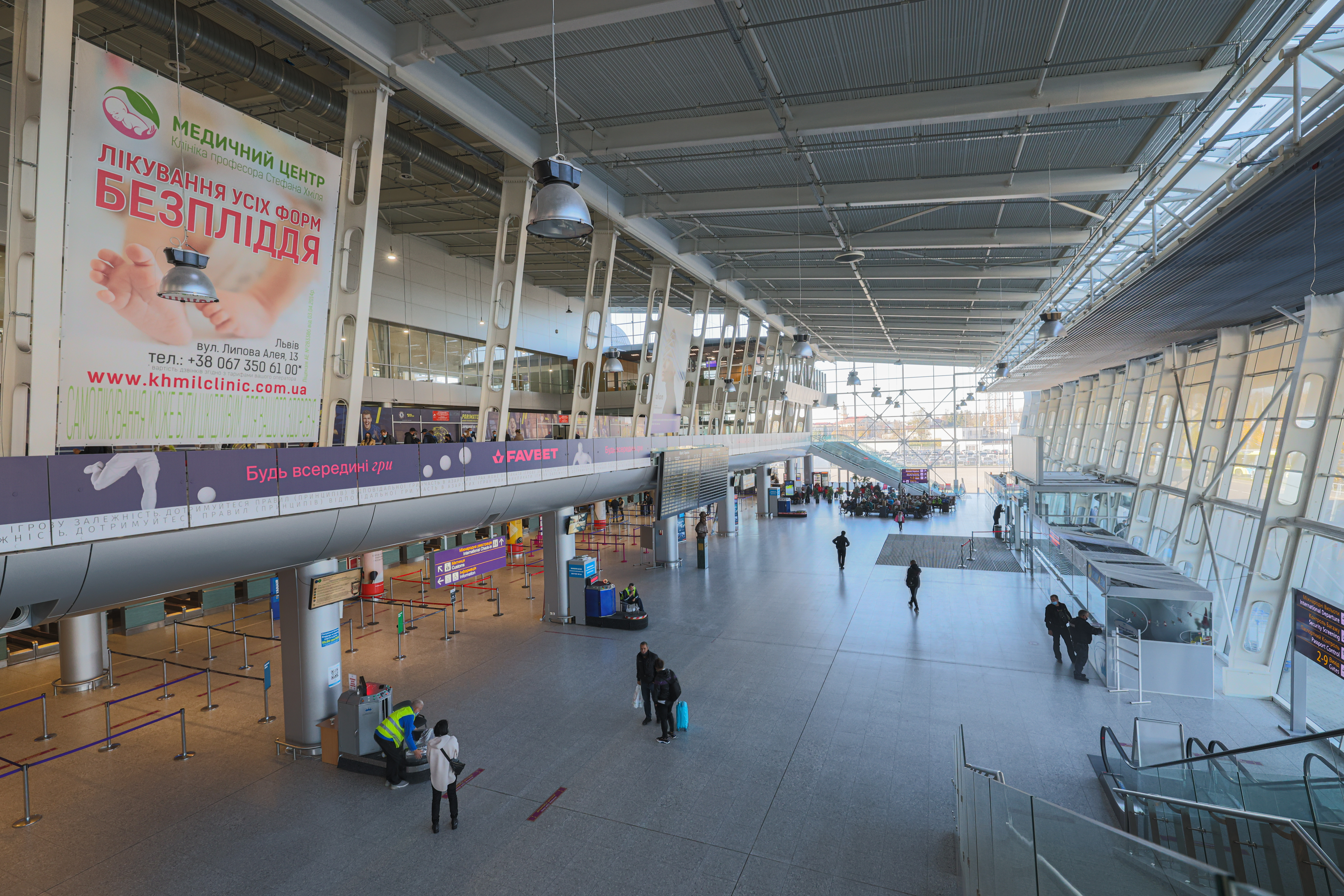
Terminal interior

A dedicated express link bus to Lviv railway station runs every 90 minutes. The airport is also served by Lviv's public transport, specifically the bus route 48 and the trolleybus route 29, both of which terminate in the city centre. Taxis are also available at the airport, as well as car rental services.

== Accidents and incidents ==
- The airfield was the site of the Sknyliv air show disaster in 2002, which killed 77.
- On 4 October 2019, Ukraine Air Alliance Flight 4050, an Antonov An-12 crash-landed in a field close to the village of Sokilnyky 1.5 km (0.9 miles) short of the runway of Lviv airport, killing at least five people. The Ukraine Air Alliance (Ukraine-Aeroalliance) plane ran out of fuel before a planned stopover at Lviv, en route from Vigo in Spain to Istanbul.
- On 18 March 2022, during the Russo-Ukrainian War, an aircraft-repair plant at the airport was hit by several Russian missiles.

== See also ==
- List of airports in Ukraine
- List of the busiest airports in Ukraine
- List of the busiest airports in Europe
- List of the busiest airports in the former USSR
