= Wizz Air Abu Dhabi =

Low-cost airline of the United Arab Emirates (2019–2025)

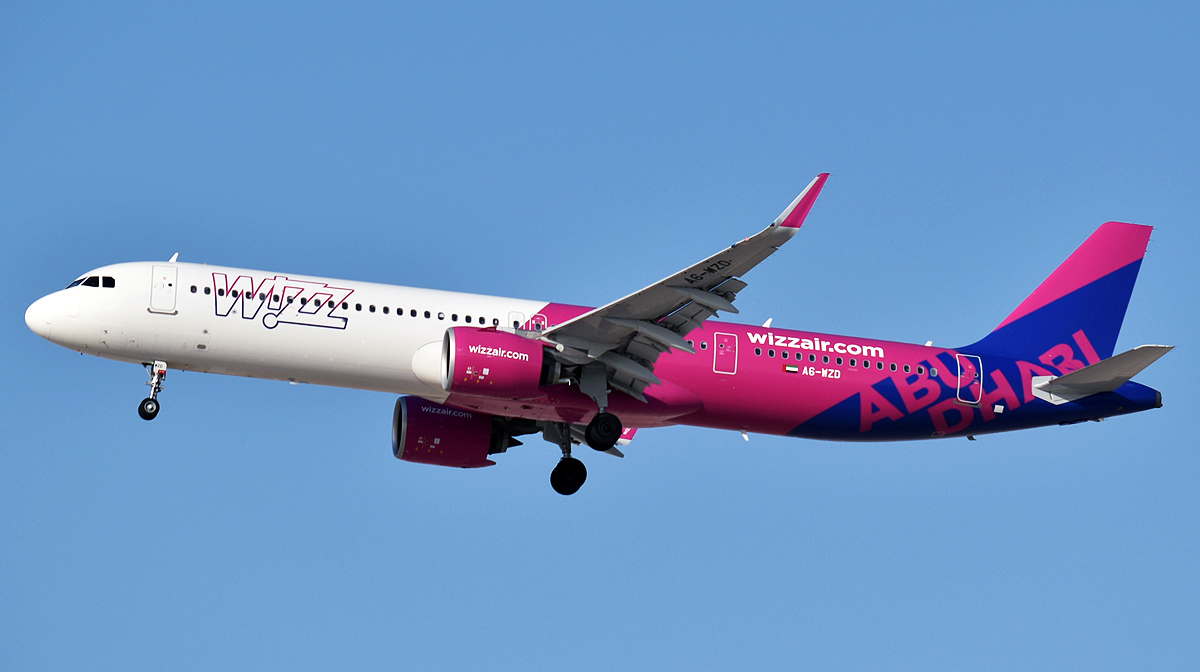
- Airbus A321neo
IATA	ICAO	Call sign
5W (formerly J5)	WAZ	WIZZ SKY
- Founded: 12 December 2019
- Ceased operations: 1 September 2025
- Operating bases: Zayed International Airport
- Fleet size: 12
- Destinations: 29
- Parent company: Abu Dhabi Developmental Holding Company (51%); Wizz Air (49%)
- Headquarters: Abu Dhabi, United Arab Emirates
- Key people: Johan Eidhagen (Managing Director)
- Website: www.wizzair.com

Wizz Air Abu Dhabi (Arabic: ويز اير أبوظبي) was an Emirati low-cost airline based at Zayed International Airport in Abu Dhabi, the capital city of the United Arab Emirates. It was owned by Abu Dhabi Developmental Holding Company (51%) and Wizz Air (49%). It operated from January 2021 until September 2025.

== History ==
In December 2019, Wizz Air announced it would establish a new subsidiary, based at Zayed International Airport, offering low-cost flights from the airport to tap into growth markets across the Middle East, Africa and the Indian subcontinent. The airline is a joint venture with state-owned Abu Dhabi Developmental Holding Company (ADQ) which owns 51 per cent with Wizz Air Holdings owning the remaining 49 per cent. Flights began in January 2021 with two Airbus A321neo aircraft on flights to Athens.

In July 2020, Wizz Air Abu Dhabi announced its initial route network, launching six destinations from its base in Abu Dhabi.

In April 2021, Wizz Air added Abu Dhabi to its services, offering connections to Europe beyond the United Arab Emirates to neighbouring Arab countries.

In July 2025, Wizz Air announced it would cease all Abu Dhabi operations effective 1 September 2025, ending its six-year presence in the UAE to focus on its core European markets. It cited several challenges including geopolitical instability leading to airspace closures, extreme heat affecting engine efficiency, regulatory barriers limiting route permissions and operational constraints that undermined its low-cost model.

The company's chief executive, József Váradi, called the decision "tough but necessary." Váradi later accused the Abu Dhabi government of favoritism to the government-owned flag carrier Etihad Airways, also owned by ADQ.

According to Váradi, Wizz Air had planned to start routes to India and Pakistan as part of their investment memorandum and was granted permission to do so, but Abu Dhabi later decided to hand over their designation to Etihad. Etihad Airways CEO Antonoaldo Neves responded that there was no favoritism toward Etihad by Abu Dhabi and that the aviation regulation in the UAE adhered to the universal principle of grandfather rights which is an international norms practice where incumbent carriers retain established traffic rights based on historical precedence, stating that he would not go to Paris and expect to take over traffic rights of Air France.

== Destinations ==
In March 2025, Wizz Air Abu Dhabi served these destinations:

Operated by Wizz Air Abu Dhabi (5W) Operated to and from the UAE by Wizz Air Hungary/Malta (W6/W4)

Country	City	Airport	Notes
Albania	Tirana	Tirana International Airport Nënë Tereza	
Armenia	Yerevan	Zvartnots International Airport	
Azerbaijan	Baku	Heydar Aliyev International Airport	
Azerbaijan	Qabala	Qabala International Airport	
Bahrain	Bahrain	Bahrain International Airport	Terminated
Bosnia and Herzegovina	Sarajevo	Sarajevo International Airport	
Bulgaria	Sofia	Vasil Levski Sofia Airport	
Bulgaria	Varna	Varna Airport	
Cyprus	Larnaca	Larnaca International Airport	
Egypt	Alexandria	Borg El Arab International Airport	
Egypt	Giza	Sphinx International Airport	
Egypt	Luxor	Luxor International Airport	Terminated
Egypt	Sohag	Sohag International Airport	
Egypt	Assiut	Assiut Airport	
Georgia	Kutaisi	David the Builder Kutaisi International Airport	
Greece	Athens	Athens International Airport	Terminated
Greece	Chania	Chania International Airport	Terminated
Greece	Mykonos	Mykonos Airport	Terminated
Greece	Rhodes	Rhodes International Airport	Terminated
Greece	Santorini	Santorini International Airport	Terminated
Greece	Thessaloniki	Thessaloniki Airport	Terminated
Iraq	Erbil	Erbil International Airport	Terminated
Israel	Tel Aviv	Ben Gurion Airport	
Italy	Rome	Rome Fiumicino Airport	Terminated
Jordan	Amman	Queen Alia International Airport	
Jordan	Aqaba	King Hussein International Airport	Terminated
Kazakhstan	Almaty	Almaty International Airport	
Kazakhstan	Astana	Nursultan Nazarbayev International Airport	
Kazakhstan	Turkistan	Hazret Sultan International Airport	
Kuwait	Kuwait City	Kuwait International Airport	Terminated
Kyrgyzstan	Bishkek	Manas International Airport	
Lebanon	Beirut	Beirut–Rafic Hariri International Airport	
Maldives	Malé	Velana International Airport	Terminated
Moldova	Chișinău	Chișinău International Airport	
Oman	Muscat	Muscat International Airport	Terminated
Oman	Salalah	Salalah International Airport	
Romania	Bucharest	Bucharest Băneasa Aurel Vlaicu International Airport	
Romania	Cluj-Napoca	Cluj International Airport	
Russia	Krasnodar	Krasnodar International Airport	Terminated
Russia	Moscow	Vnukovo International Airport	Terminated
Saudi Arabia	Dammam	King Fahd International Airport	
Saudi Arabia	Medina	Prince Mohammad bin Abdulaziz International Airport	
Serbia	Belgrade	Belgrade Nikola Tesla Airport	
Turkey	Ankara	Ankara Esenboğa Airport	Terminated
Turkey	Antalya	Antalya Airport	Terminated
Ukraine	Kyiv	Boryspil International Airport	Terminated
Ukraine	Odesa	Odesa International Airport	Terminated
United Arab Emirates	Abu Dhabi	Zayed International Airport	Base
Uzbekistan	Samarkand	Samarkand International Airport	
Uzbekistan	Tashkent	Tashkent International Airport	

These destinations from Abu Dhabi were flown by the sister subsidiary Wizz Air Hungary (W6) or Wizz Air Malta (W4) and not by Wizz Air Abu Dhabi (5W):

- Austria: Vienna
- Hungary: Budapest
- Italy: Milan–Malpensa
- Poland: Katowice, Kraków
- Romania: Bucharest–Otopeni

Wizz Air Hungary/Malta formerly operated from these destinations to Abu Dhabi:

- Bulgaria: Sofia
- Italy: Bari, Catania, Naples, Rome-Fiumicino
- Romania: Cluj-Napoca
