= Bucharest Băneasa Aurel Vlaicu International Airport =

Secondary airport serving Bucharest, Romania

Bucharest Băneasa Aurel Vlaicu International Airport Aeroportul Internațional București Băneasa Aurel Vlaicu

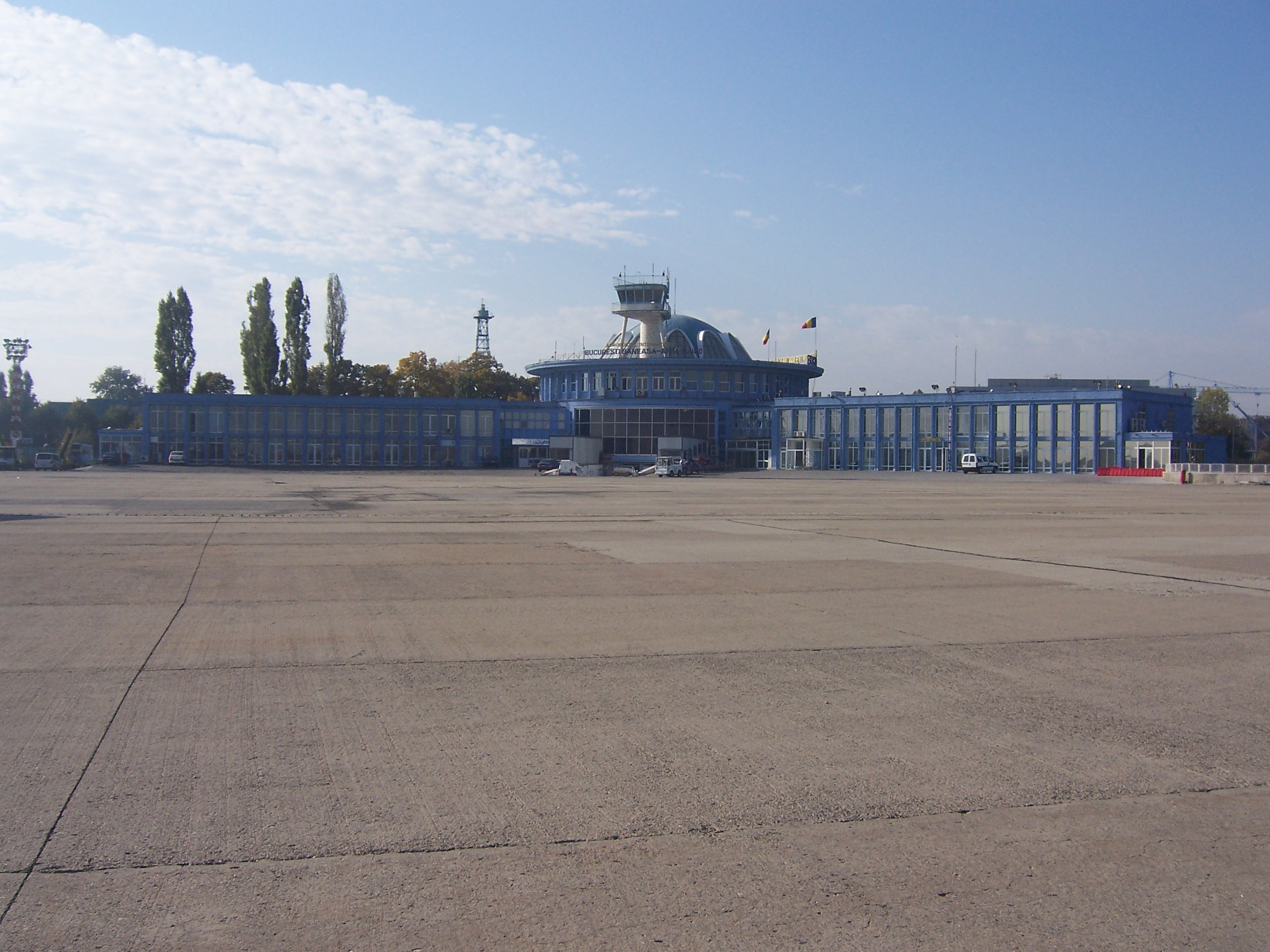
- IATA: BBU; ICAO: LRBS

Summary
- Airport type: Public
- Operator: Compania Națională Aeroporturi București S.A.
- Serves: Bucharest
- Location: Băneasa
- Opened: 1920; 106 years ago
- Hub for: Wizz Air
- Built: 1912; 114 years ago
- Elevation AMSL: 299 ft (91 m)
- Coordinates: 44°30′13″N 026°06′13″E
- Website: www.bucharestairports.ro/baneasa/en

Map
- Location within Romania

Runways
Direction	Length		Surface
Direction	m	ft	Surface
07/25	3,100	10,465	Asphalt

Statistics (2025)
- Passengers: 694,718
- Passengers change 2024–25: ▲548.7%
- Aircraft movements: 14,989
- Source: AIP at the Romanian Airports Association (RAA)

Bucharest Băneasa Aurel Vlaicu International Airport (IATA: BBU, ICAO: LRBS) — generally known as Băneasa Airport or Bucharest City Airport — is located in Băneasa district, Bucharest, Romania, 8.5 km (5.3 mi) north of the city center. Named after Aurel Vlaicu, a Romanian engineer, inventor, aeroplane constructor, and early pilot, it was Bucharest's only commercial airport until 1969, when the Otopeni Airport (today Henri Coandă International Airport) was opened to civilian use.

Until March 2012, when it was converted into a business airport, Aurel Vlaicu International was the second airport in Romania in terms of air traffic, and Bucharest's low-cost airline hub. Since 2025, the airport has once again resumed regular low-cost services, with a new terminal planned for construction by 2035.

== History ==
=== Foundation and early years ===
The first flights in the Băneasa area took place in 1909 and they were carried out by the French pilot and aviation pioneer Louis Blériot, who flew on 18 October at the Băneasa Hippodrome. In 1912, one of the first flight schools in Romania was opened at the Băneasa airfield by George Valentin Bibescu. This makes Băneasa airport the oldest continuously operating airport in Eastern Europe, and places it among the five oldest airports in the world.

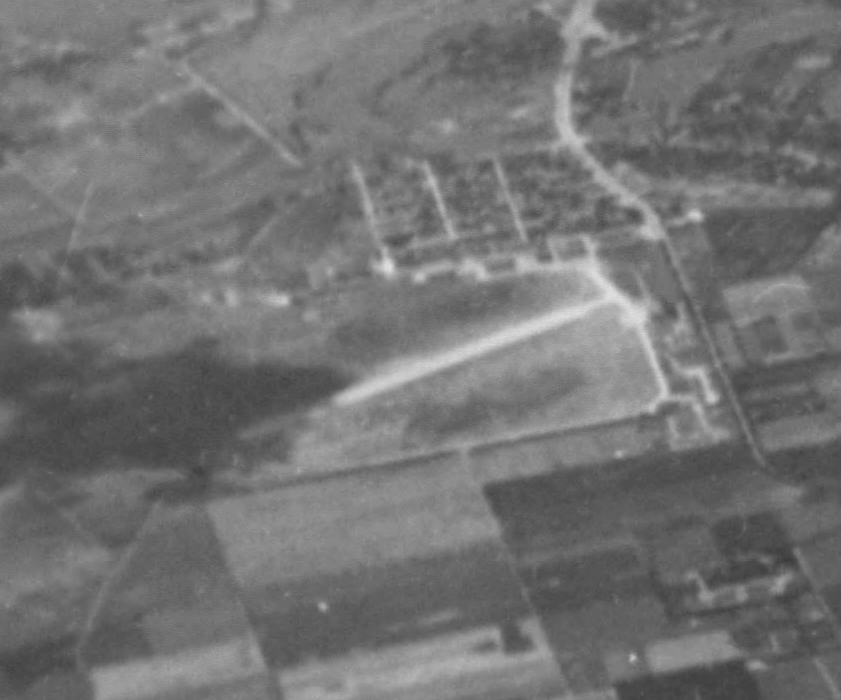
Aerial view of the airport in 1944

In 1922, the airport headquartered the first aviation company in Romania, and one of the earliest in the world, CFRNA (The French–Romanian Company for Air Navigation), the precursor of the Romanian national airline, TAROM. In 1923, CFRNA built the industrial facilities for aircraft maintenance in Băneasa. These facilities preceded the aerospace company Romaero. During World War II, the airport was used by both Romanian and German units as an aircraft repair hub and also functioned as the headquarters of the Romanian White Squadron. The airport mainly had a grass surface with a single 940 metres (3,080 ft) long concrete runway built in 1942.

The current terminal building was designed in the late 1940s and opened in 1952. At that time it was considered one of the finest architectural features of Bucharest. The building consists of a central dome with three distinct wings which represent an airplane propeller with three blades.

During the communist period (1947–1989), Băneasa Airport was TAROM's domestic hub, while Otopeni Airport was used as an international hub. In the early 2000s (decade), TAROM moved all of its activities to Otopeni (renamed Henri Coandă International Airport).

=== The 2007 low-cost "invasion" ===
The first low-cost airline established at BBU was Blue Air in 2004. From January 2007, the low-fare airlines Wizz Air, EasyJet, and Germanwings started European routes from Băneasa. In 2007, the airport was closed from 10 May to 19 August for renovation works. All flights during this period were moved to Henri Coandă International Airport. Renovations included commercial areas, restaurants, a VIP lounge and a 300-space car park. The runway and lighting systems were also completely overhauled. The estimated cost was €20m.

=== Conversion into a business airport and reopening ===
In March 2012, Băneasa was dedicated to business air traffic. The last passenger air traffic was transferred to Henri Coandă International Airport on 25 March 2012.

In 2017 and 2018, public talks organized by the managing company took place, suggesting that the airport may be re-opened for regular flights, following renovation works, that may be completed in two years from start. In June 2019, it was announced that the airport will reopen for commercial flights in early 2020.

On 1 August 2022, the airport was re-opened after 10 years of renovation work and 110 years since it was founded. The first scheduled flight was operated on 20 April 2023, to Antalya. Interest for operating on the new airport has already been shown by airlines such as Ryanair and FlyOne, but also from domestic carriers, such as AirConnect.

== Terminals ==
The building is a late 1940s design, and was not built to cope with more than 600,000 passengers per year and departures every 25 minutes. As such in the few years before 2012 when the airport was closed to commercial scheduled flights, the facilities were extremely undersized and became very crowded. The building cannot be expanded, because of its status as a historic monument, and because of the sheer lack of space in the airport area.

== Airlines and destinations ==
The following airlines operate flights at Aurel Vlaicu International Airport:

Airlines	Destinations
Fly Lili	Seasonal charter: Antalya, Bodrum, Enfidha, Hurghada, Sharm El Sheikh
Ryanair	Bari, Girona, Karlsruhe/Baden–Baden, Kraków, Memmingen
Wizz Air	Basel/Mulhouse, Bergamo, Budapest, Hahn, Hamburg, Kraków, Memmingen, Naples, Stockholm–Arlanda, Warsaw–Chopin

== Statistics ==
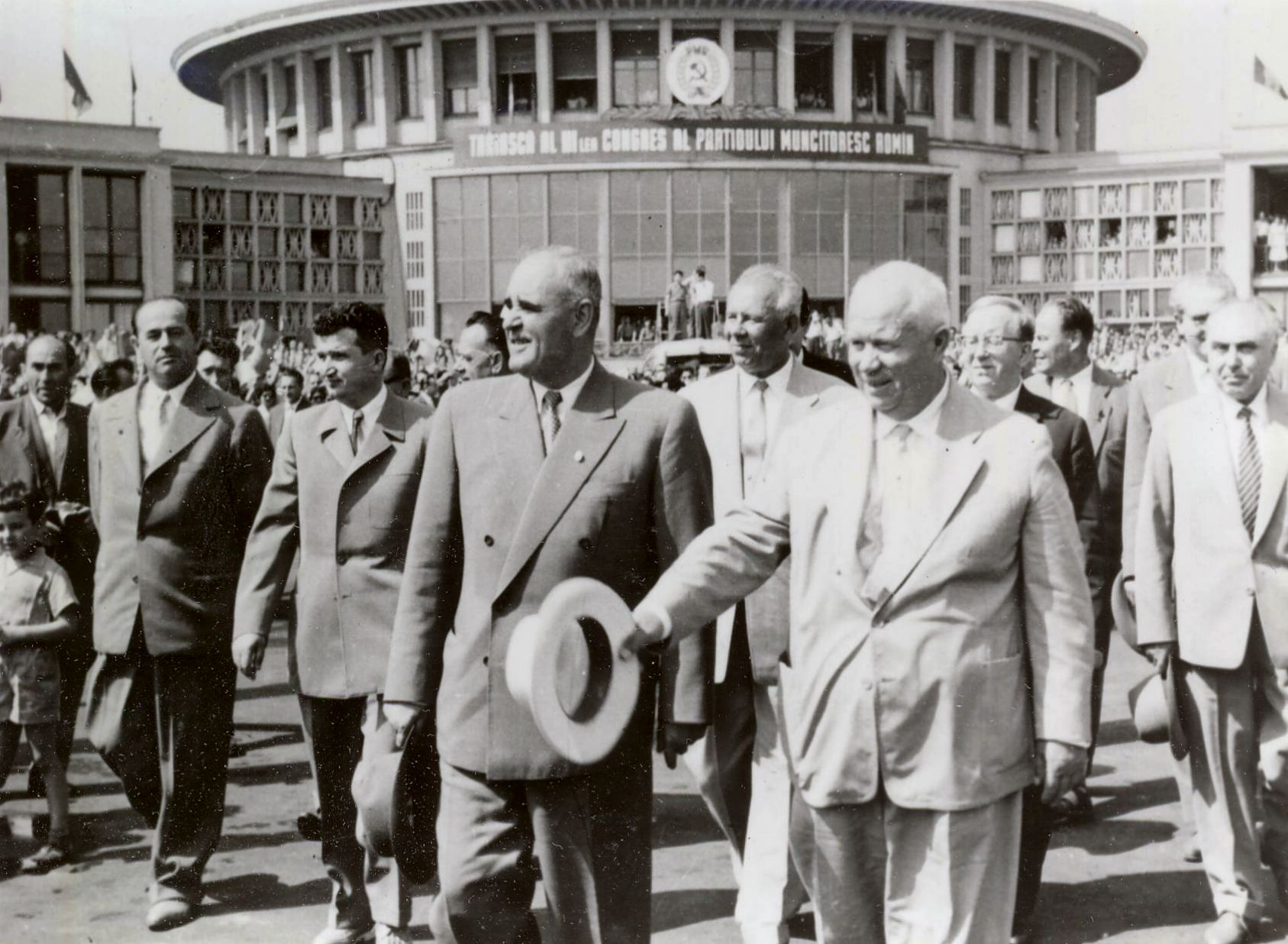
Gheorghe Gheorghiu-Dej, with Nicolae Ceaușescu at his right hand side, and Nikita Khrushchev at Băneasa Airport in June 1960.

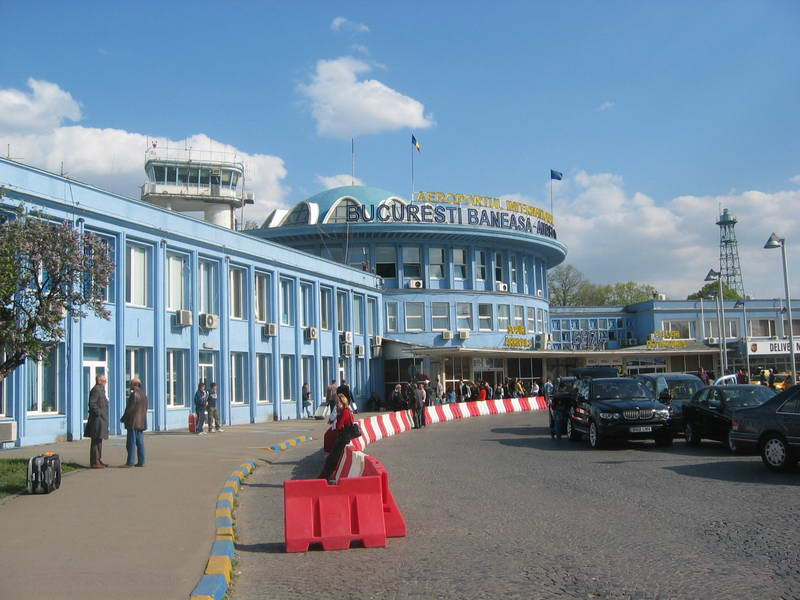
Terminal exterior (2007).

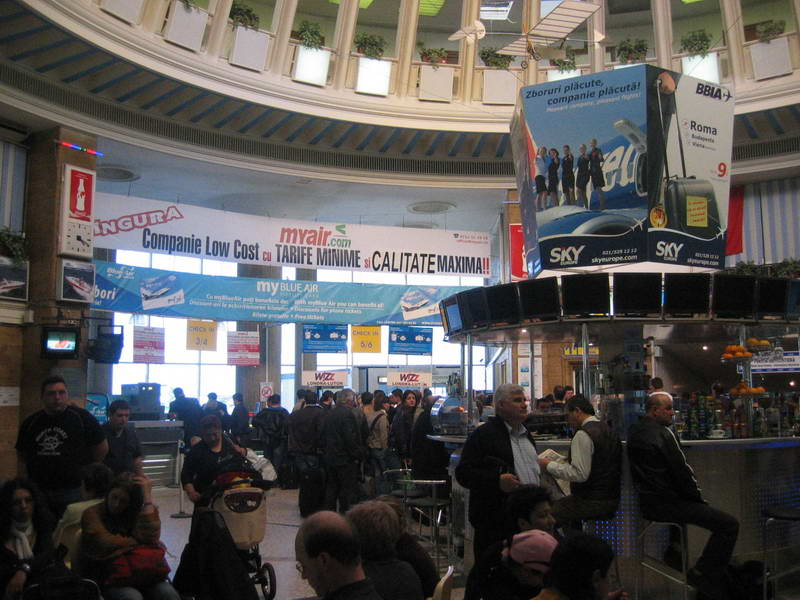
Terminal interior (2007).

From as low as 20 to 30 passengers per month in 2001–2002, BBU handled 119,000 passengers in 2004, and 2,398,911 passengers in 2011.

Year	Passengers	Compared to Previous Year
2005	380,474	▲222%
2006	672,923	▲76.8%
2007	968,084	▲43.8%
2008	1,724,633	▲78.1%
2009	1,974,337	▲14.4%
2010	1,881,509	▼4.7%
2011	2,398,911	▲27.5%
2012	424,016	▼82.3%
2013	6,036	▼98.6%
2014	4,960	▼17.8%
2015	12,925	▲160.5%
2016	5,375	▼58,4%
2017	5,645	▲5.0%
2018	5,690	▲0.8%
2019	6,975	▲22.6%
2020	12,329	▲76.7%
2021	7,681	▼37.7%
2022	9,624	▲25.3%
2023	68,130	▲607.9%
2024	107,087	▲57.2%
2025	694,718	▲548.7%

== Bucharest International Air Show ==
The airport has been the set where the Bucharest International Air Show, the largest of its kind in Romania, has been taking place. In 2018, this event had its tenth edition, with 150 aircraft on the ground and on display in the air and 100 pilots and paratroopers, from 13 countries.

== Ground transportation ==
=== Road ===
The airport is situated 8 km (5 miles) north of Bucharest city centre and is accessible by STB buses, trams and Airport Express. Taxis and ride-sharing services are also present and accessible.

=== Metro ===
An extension of the Bucharest Metro system to Aurel Vlaicu International, as Metro Line M6, which will link it to the Main Train Station and the larger Henri Coandă International Airport, was approved in June 2006 and is currently under construction.

== See also ==
- Aviation in Romania
- Transport in Romania
