= Wizz Air UK =

Low-cost airline of the United Kingdom

Wizz Air UK Limited

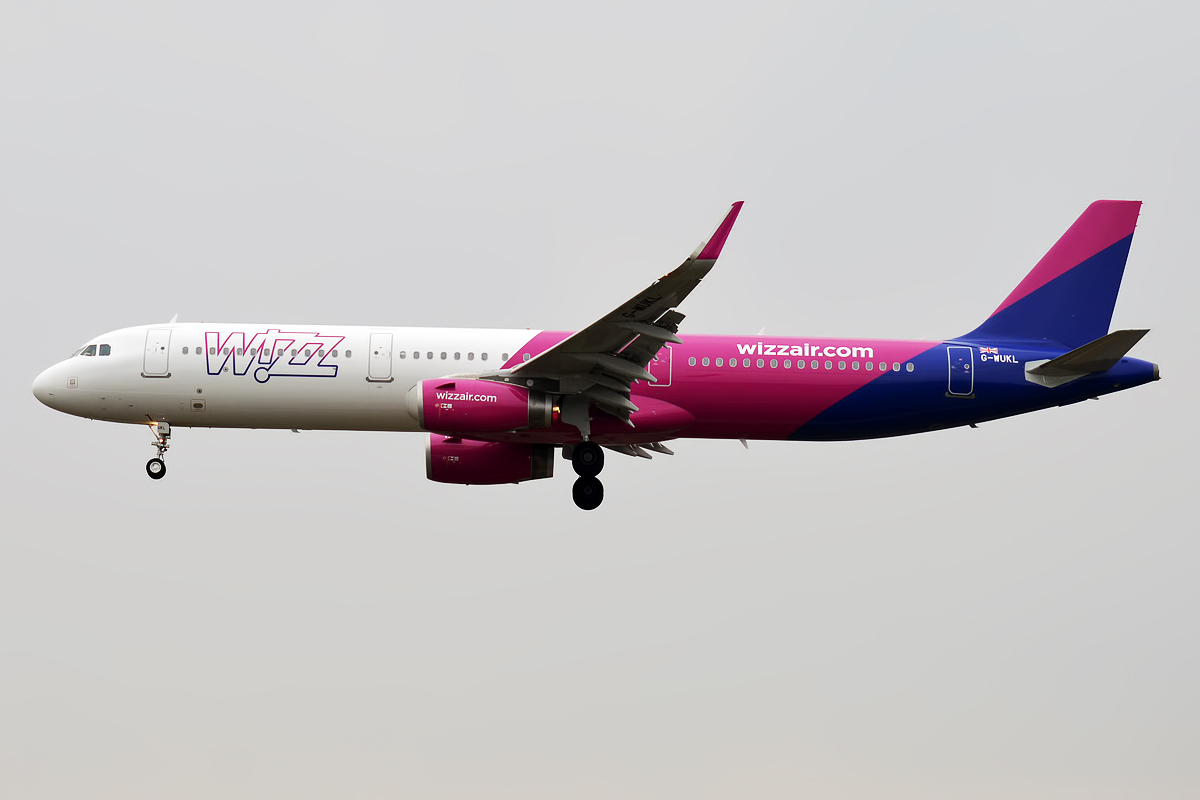
- A Wizz Air UK Airbus A321
IATA	ICAO	Call sign
W9	WUK	WIZZ GO
- Founded: 26 September 2017; 8 years ago
- Commenced operations: 3 May 2018; 8 years ago
- AOC #: 2449
- Operating bases: London–Gatwick; London–Luton
- Frequent-flyer program: WIZZ Discount Club
- Fleet size: 21
- Destinations: 57
- Parent company: Wizz Air Holdings plc
- Headquarters: Luton, England
- Key people: Yvonne Moynihan (Managing Director)
- Website: www.wizzair.com

Wizz Air UK Limited is a British low-cost airline and subsidiary of Wizz Air Holdings plc, using its corporate identity. Founded to enable Wizz Air to retain full UK market access post-Brexit, it is headquartered at London Luton Airport, and has bases at Luton and London Gatwick Airport. Wizz Air, including its UK subsidiary, operate flights from eight UK airports to almost 90 destinations across Europe and the Middle East.

Wizz Air UK holds a Civil Aviation Authority (CAA) Type A Operating Licence permitting it to carry passengers, cargo and mail on aircraft with 20 or more seats.

== UK launch ==
In October 2017, Wizz Air announced it had applied for an air operator's certificate (AOC) in the United Kingdom through a new UK-based subsidiary, Wizz Air UK, with plans for the subsidiary to take over a number of Wizz Air's existing routes from its existing Luton Airport base starting in March 2018. The following month, the airline announced an expansion of service at Luton after acquiring departure and landing slots from defunct Monarch Airlines. Wizz Air UK received its AOC in May 2018, two months later than originally planned.

Wizz Air UK opened its second base at Doncaster Sheffield Airport in August 2020, basing only one aircraft there and operating 10 routes. This was increased to 23 routes and another based aircraft in September 2020. However, in June 2022 Wizz Air UK announced its Doncaster Sheffield base would be closing, citing the airport's inability to guarantee the terms of its commercial agreement with Wizz. In October 2022, Wizz Air ceased operating from Doncaster Sheffield and launched seven routes from nearby Leeds Bradford Airport.

Wizz opened a base at Gatwick Airport near London in October 2020, with one aircraft flying four new routes.

In December 2020, Wizz Air UK announced it would be opening its fourth UK base at Cardiff Airport, basing one aircraft and opening nine routes. In January 2023, Wizz Air announced the indefinite closure of its Cardiff base despite operating for less than a year. The airline cited economic pressures such as rising fuel prices as the reason for the closure. The last Wizz Air flights from Cardiff were on 25 January 2023.

== Civil Aviation Authority dispute resolution ==
In December 2022, the UK Civil Aviation Authority announced its findings that Wizz Air ranked as the worst airline for complaints escalated to dispute resolution services in the third quarter, at 811 complaints per million passengers. Wizz Air UK was also the worst performer for flight delays from UK airports in both 2021 and 2022, according to studies of Civil Aviation Authority data by PA Media released in August 2022 and April 2023.

== Destinations ==
Wizz Air UK operates in conjunction with parent company Wizz Air. Together, they operate to almost 90 destinations from the UK.

As of November 2023, the airline group uses the UK AOC on flights connecting the UK with the European Union, Europe, Morocco and the North Western part of the Middle East.

== Fleet ==
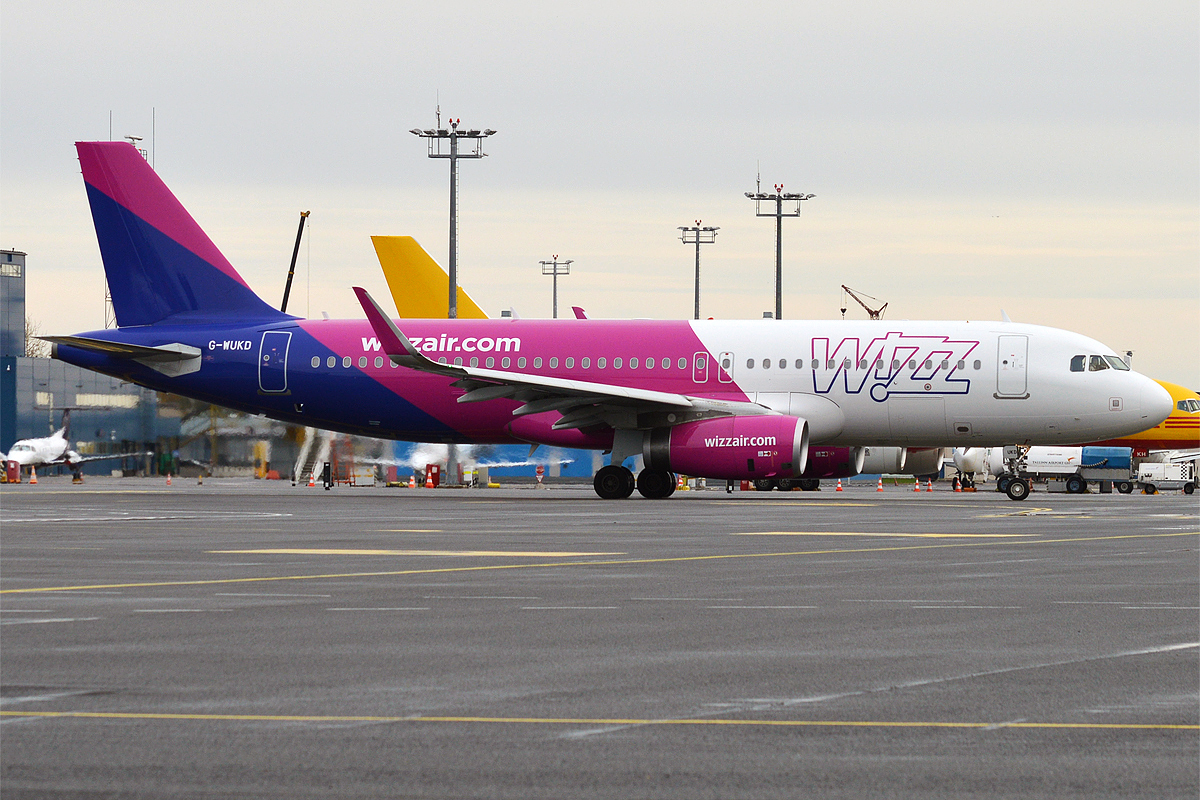
Wizz Air UK Airbus A320-200

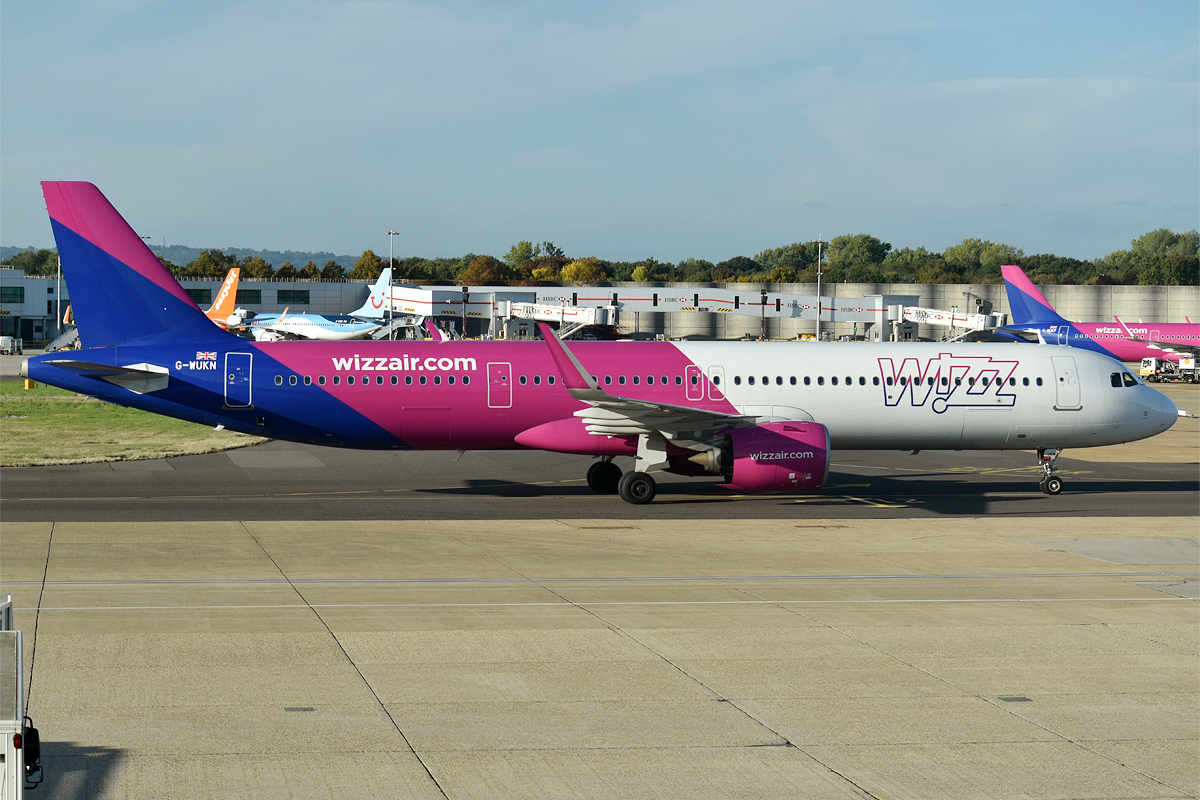
Wizz Air UK Airbus A321neo

=== Current fleet ===
As of July 2026, Wizz Air UK operates the following aircraft:

Wizz Air UK fleet
Aircraft	In service	Orders	Passengers	Notes
Airbus A321neo	18	—	239	
Airbus A321XLR	3	8	239	All XLR aircraft will be transferred to the UK AOC G-XLRA Parked after tailstrike
Total	21	8		

=== Former fleet ===
As of September 2025, Wizz Air UK operated 18 Airbus A321neo and 3 Airbus A321XLR
