= Milan Airport =

Milan Airport may refer to any of these aerodromes serving Milan, Italy:

- Malpensa Airport – the main international airport
- Linate Airport – a smaller airport for domestic and European services
- Il Caravaggio International Airport, near Bergamo – another airport for domestic and European services
- Bresso Airfield – used only by general aviation
- Airports of Milan - an overview of all the airports serving Milan and its metropolitan area.
