= List of busiest city airport systems by passenger traffic =

London's six commercial airports is the world's busiest city airport system, as measured by the total number of passengers from all airports within a city or metropolitan area combined. Hartsfield–Jackson Atlanta International Airport is the world's busiest individual airport.

== 2024 statistics ==
The following list is based on information provided by the Airports Council International's full-year figures for the Top 30 airports in the world.

Rank	Metropolitan area	Country	Total passengers	Airport(s) included
1.	London	United Kingdom	177,591,890	Heathrow, Gatwick, Stansted, Luton, City, Southend
2.	New York City	United States	149,332,285	JFK, Newark, LaGuardia, Westchester County, Long Island
3.	Tokyo	Japan	125,507,651	Haneda, Narita
4.	Shanghai	China	124,757,039	Pudong, Hongqiao
5.	Istanbul	Turkey	121,879,784	Istanbul, Sabiha Gökçen
6.	Beijing	China	116,767,428	Capital, Daxing
7.	Dubai	United Arab Emirates	110,501,725	Dubai, Al Maktoum, Sharjah
8.	Paris	France	109,970,792	CDG, Orly, Beauvais
9.	Atlanta	United States	108,067,766	Hartsfield–Jackson
10.	Los Angeles	United States	105,460,610	LAX, Long Beach, Burbank, John Wayne, Ontario
11.	Dallas	United States	104,149,211	Dallas-Fort Worth, Love Field
12.	Chicago	United States	101,812,571	O'Hare, Midway, Rockford
13.	Miami	United States	99,538,696	Miami, Fort Lauderdale, Palm Beach
14.	Seoul	South Korea	94,147,546	Incheon, Gimpo
15.	Bangkok	Thailand	92,725,328	Suvarnabhumi, Don Mueang
16.	Chengdu	China	87,336,138	Tianfu, Shuangliu
17.	Denver	United States	82,358,744	Denver
18.	Washington, D.C.	United States	80,604,542	Dulles, Reagan, Thurgood Marshall
19.	Delhi	India	79,259,890	Indira Gandhi
20.	São Paulo	Brazil	79,107,359	Guarulhos, Congonhas, Viracopos
21.	Guangzhou	China	77,694,148	Baiyun, Shadi
22.	San Francisco	United States	75,733,065	San Francisco, Oakland, San Jose, Charles M. Schulz
23.	Moscow	Russia	75,311,773	Domodedovo, Sheremetyevo, Vnukovo
24.	Singapore	Singapore	67,700,000	Changi
25.	Amsterdam	Netherlands	66,828,759	Schiphol
26.	Madrid	Spain	66,196,984	Barajas
27.	Frankfurt	Germany	63,430,069	Frankfurt, Hahn
28.	Houston	United States	63,061,150	George Bush, Hobby
29.	Shenzhen	China	61,477,337	Bao'an
30.	Orlando	United States	60,089,154	Orlando, Sanford

== 2023 statistics ==
The following list is based on preliminary full-year figures provided by the Port Authority of New York and New Jersey, along with figures provided by airports and aviation ministries when not available from the former list.

Rank	Metropolitan area	Country	Total passengers	Airport(s) included
1.	London	United Kingdom	168,020,051	Heathrow, Gatwick, Stansted, Luton, City, Southend
2.	New York City	United States	147,461,065	JFK, Newark, LaGuardia, Westchester County, Long Island
3.	Istanbul	Turkey	112,837,331	Istanbul, Sabiha Gökçen
4.	Tokyo	Japan	111,425,297	Haneda, Narita
5.	Paris	France	105,329,305	CDG, Orly, Beauvais
6.	Atlanta	United States	104,653,451	Hartsfield–Jackson
7.	Dubai	United Arab Emirates	103,856,212	Dubai, Al Maktoum, Sharjah
8.	Los Angeles	United States	102,996,269	LAX, Long Beach, Burbank, John Wayne, Ontario
9.	Dallas	United States	99,347,147	Dallas-Fort Worth, Love Field, Fort Worth Meacham
10.	Shanghai	China	96,969,142	Pudong, Hongqiao
11.	Chicago	United States	96,177,715	O'Hare, Midway, Rockford
12.	Miami	United States	95,222,644	Miami, Fort Lauderdale, Palm Beach
13.	Beijing	China	92,279,156	Capital, Daxing
14.	Seoul	South Korea	79,659,570	Incheon, Gimpo
15.	Bangkok	Thailand	78,679,532	Suvarnabhumi, Don Mueang
16.	Denver	United States	77,837,917	Denver
17.	Washington, D.C.	United States	76,789,012	Dulles, Reagan, Thurgood Marshall
18.	São Paulo	Brazil	75,864,545	Guarulhos, Congonhas, Viracopos
19.	Chengdu	China	74,924,000	Tianfu, Shuangliu
20.	San Francisco	United States	73,532,329	San Francisco, Oakland, San Jose, Charles M. Schulz
21.	Delhi	India	72,214,841	Indira Gandhi
22.	Moscow	Russia	71,000,000	Domodedovo, Sheremetyevo, Vnukovo
23.	Guangzhou	China	64,240,637	Baiyun, Shadi
24.	Amsterdam	Netherlands	61,889,586	Schiphol
25.	Frankfurt	Germany	61,055,389	Frankfurt, Hahn
26.	Orlando	United States	60,677,182	Orlando, Sanford
27.	Madrid	Spain	60,181,604	Barajas
28.	Houston	United States	60,077,128	George Bush, Hobby
29.	Singapore	Singapore	58,946,000	Changi
30.	Las Vegas	United States	57,666,456	Harry Reid
31.	Charlotte	United States	53,445,770	Douglas
32.	Jakarta	Indonesia	52,870,532	Soekarno–Hatta, Halim Perdanakusuma
33.	Shenzhen	China	52,734,934	Bao'an
34.	Mexico City	Mexico	52,566,700	Benito Juarez, Felipe Ángeles, Toluca
35.	Barcelona	Spain	52,515,810	Josep Tarradellas, Girona-Costa Brava, Reus
36.	Mumbai	India	51,589,040	Chhatrapati Shivaji Maharaj
37.	Milan	Italy	51,477,949	Malpensa, Linate, Bergamo City
38.	Seattle	United States	50,877,260	Seattle-Tacoma
39.	Phoenix	United States	50,529,732	Sky Harbor, Mesa Gateway
40.	Kuala Lumpur	Malaysia	48,742,468	Kuala Lumpur, Sultan Abdul Aziz Shah
41.	Toronto	Canada	47,581,816	Pearson, Billy Bishop, Hamilton
42.	Manila	Philippines	47,300,322	Ninoy Aquino, Clark
43.	Doha	Qatar	45,916,098	Hamad
44.	Bogotá	Colombia	45,802,360	El Dorado, Guaymaral, Madrid
45.	Chongqing	China	44,657,268	Jiangbei
46.	Rome	Italy	44,429,929	Fiumicino, Ciampino
47.	Jeddah	Saudi Arabia	42,910,407	King Abdulaziz
48.	Boston	United States	42,515,122	Logan, Providence T.F. Green, Manchester (NH)
49.	Kunming	China	42,053,214	Changshui
50.	Osaka	Japan	41,536,000	Kansai, Itami, Kobe

== 2012 statistics ==
The following list is based on information provided by the Airports Council International's preliminary full-year figures for the Top 30 airports in the world, and the Top 50 airports in the US.

Rank	Metropolitan area	Country	Total passengers	Airport(s) included
1.	London	United Kingdom	134,997,486	Heathrow, Gatwick, Stansted, Luton, City, Southend
2.	New York City	United States	112,427,757	JFK, Newark, LaGuardia, Westchester County, Long Island, Stewart
3.	Tokyo	Japan	99,879,178	Haneda, Narita, Ibaraki
4.	Atlanta	United States	95,462,867	Hartsfield–Jackson
5.	Paris	France	92,738,772	CDG, Orly, Beauvais
6.	Chicago	United States	86,356,630	O'Hare, Midway, Gary, Rockford
7.	Beijing	China	85,389,239	Capital, Nanyuan
8.	Los Angeles	United States	84,129,635	LAX, Long Beach, Bob Hope, John Wayne, Ontario
9.	Shanghai	China	78,708,890	Pudong, Hongqiao
10.	Miami	United States	68,626,693	Miami, Fort Lauderdale, Palm Beach
11.	Dallas/Fort Worth	United States	66,764,842	DFW, Love Field
12.	Dubai	United Arab Emirates	65,201,088	Dubai, Al Maktoum, Sharjah
13.	Moscow	Russia	63,888,632	Domodedovo, Sheremetyevo, Vnukovo
14.	San Francisco Bay Area	United States	62,736,923	San Francisco, Oakland, San Jose, Charles M. Schulz
15.	Frankfurt	Germany	61,013,452	Frankfurt, Hahn
16.	Istanbul	Turkey	59,778,014	Atatürk, Sabiha Gökçen
17.	São Paulo	Brazil	59,016,229	Guarulhos, Congonhas, Viracopos, Campo de Marte, São José dos Campos
18.	Bangkok	Thailand	58,985,469	Suvarnabhumi, Don Mueang
19.	Seoul	South Korea	58,583,599	Incheon, Gimpo
20.	Jakarta	Indonesia	57,831,462	Soekarno-Hatta, Halim Perdanakusuma
21.	Hong Kong	China	56,057,751	Hong Kong (Chek Lap Kok)
22.	Denver	United States	53,156,278	Denver
23.	Singapore	Singapore	51,181,804	Changi
24.	Amsterdam	Netherlands	51,035,590	Schiphol
25.	Houston	United States	50,326,484	George Bush, Hobby
26.	Guangzhou	China	48,731,462	Baiyun, Shadi
27.	Madrid	Spain	45,224,305	Barajas, Torrejón, Cuatro Vientos
28.	Washington	United States	42,038,011	Dulles, Reagan
29.	Phoenix	United States	41,808,611	Sky Harbor, Mesa Gateway
30.	Rome	Italy	41,478,287	Fiumicino, Ciampino
31.	Kuala Lumpur	Malaysia	41,330,380	KLIA, Subang
32.	Charlotte	United States	41,228,372	Douglas
33.	Las Vegas	United States	40,799,830	McCarran
34.	Munich	Germany	39,227,979	Munich, Memmingen
35.	Barcelona	Spain	38,927,906	Barcelona, Girona-Costa Brava, Reus, Sabadell, Lleida-Alguaire
36.	Toronto	Canada	37,163,947	Pearson, Billy Bishop, Hamilton
37.	Sydney	Australia	36,920,000	Kingsford Smith
38.	Milan	Italy	36,657,911	Malpensa, Linate, Bergamo
39.	Orlando	United States	36,525,430	Orlando, Sanford
40.	Delhi	India	35,881,965	Indira Gandhi

== 2010 statistics ==
The following list is based on two lists compiled by CAPA Centre for Aviation based on data from Airports Council International, one ranking cities with multiple airports and the other ranking individual airports.

Rank	Metropolitan area	Country	Total passengers	Airport(s) included
1.	London	United Kingdom	127,353,419	Heathrow, Gatwick, Stansted, Luton, City, Southend
2.	New York City	United States	107,586,717	JFK, Newark, LaGuardia, Westchester County, Long Island, Stewart
3.	Tokyo	Japan	98,024,708	Haneda, Narita
4.	Atlanta	United States	89,331,622	Hartsfield–Jackson
5.	Paris	France	86,203,669	CDG, Orly, Beauvais
6.	Chicago	United States	84,302,427	O'Hare, Midway, Gary
7.	Los Angeles	United States	79,981,524	LAX, Long Beach, Bob Hope, John Wayne, Ontario
8.	Beijing	China	76,171,801	Capital, Nanyuan
9.	Shanghai	China	71,684,808	Pudong, Hongqiao
10.	Dallas/Fort Worth	United States	64,867,419	DFW, Love Field
11.	Miami	United States	63,998,275	Miami, Fort Lauderdale, Palm Beach
12.	San Francisco Bay Area	United States	56,905,161	San Francisco, Oakland, San Jose, Charles M. Schulz
13.	Frankfurt	Germany	56,172,796	Frankfurt, Hahn
14.	Dubai	United Arab Emirates	53,487,326	Dubai, Sharjah
15.	Denver	United States	52,211,242	Denver
16.	Seoul	South Korea	51,044,826	Incheon, Gimpo
17.	Moscow	Russia	50,958,643	Domodedovo, Sheremetyevo, Vnukovo
18.	Hong Kong	China	50,410,819	Hong Kong (Chek Lap Kok)
19.	Madrid	Spain	49,786,202	Barajas
20.	Houston	United States	49,533,570	George Bush, Hobby
21.	São Paulo	Brazil	48,224,873	Guarulhos, Congonhas, Viracopos, Campo de Marte, São José dos Campos
22.	Amsterdam	Netherlands	45,211,749	Schiphol
23.	Bangkok	Thailand	44,262,347	Suvarnabhumi, Don Mueang
24.	Jakarta	Indonesia	43,981,022	Soekarno-Hatta
25.	Istanbul	Turkey	43,333,497	Atatürk, Sabiha Gökçen
26.	Singapore	Singapore	42,038,777	Changi
27.	Washington	United States	41,697,356	Dulles, Reagan
28.	Guangzhou	China	40,975,253	Baiyun
29.	Rome	Italy	40,486,202	Fiumicino, Ciampino
30.	Phoenix	United States	39,464,409	Sky Harbor, Mesa Gateway
31.	Barcelona	Spain	38,768,886	Barcelona, Girona-Costa Brava, Reus, Sabadell, Lleida-Alguaire
32.	Las Vegas	United States	39,397,359	McCarran
33.	Charlotte	United States	38,143,078	Douglas
34.	Sydney	Australia	35,992,164	Sydney
35.	Orlando	United States	35,775,107	Orlando, Sanford
36.	Kuala Lumpur	Malaysia	35,205,636	KLIA, LCCT Subang
37.	Milan	Italy	34,670,437	Malpensa, Linate, Bergamo
38.	Munich	Germany	34,598,634	Munich
39.	Düsseldorf/Cologne/Bonn	Germany	33,475,569	Düsseldorf, Cologne Bonn, Dortmund, Weeze
40.	Toronto	Canada	33,452,851	Pearson, Toronto Island, Hamilton

== See also ==
- List of cities with more than one commercial airport
