= List of cities with more than one commercial airport =

Many cities are served by more than one airport, typically to avoid congestion, and where there may be factors preventing expansion of existing airports. In other cities, multiple airports may be built to cater for different uses, such as international and domestic flights. (For instance, domestic flights may use smaller aircraft which can use a shorter runway.) The following lists cities which are served by more than one airport offering scheduled passenger services. Airports are included even if they are not within the city boundaries. Military airbases (without passenger service) and airports with only charter flights or cargo service are not included.

== Four or more airports ==
Airport	IATA Code	Location	Within city limits?	Distance and direction from city center	Passengers
Seven airports
United States, New York, New York metropolitan area, New York City
John F. Kennedy International Airport	JFK	Jamaica, Queens	Yes	19 km (12 mi) southeast	62,551,072 (2019)
Newark Liberty International Airport	EWR	Newark, New Jersey	No	8 km (5.0 mi) west	46,336,452 (2019)
LaGuardia Airport	LGA	East Elmhurst, Queens	Yes	4 km (2.5 mi) east	31,084,894 (2019)
Westchester County Airport	HPN	White Plains, New York	No	53 km (33 mi) north	1,390,932 (2018)
Long Island MacArthur Airport	ISP	Islip, New York	No	81 km (50 mi) east	1,348,000 (2022)
Stewart International Airport	SWF	Newburgh, New York	No	88 km (55 mi) north	529,545 (2019)
Trenton-Mercer Airport	TTN	Ewing Township, New Jersey	No	104 km (65 mi) south	462,173 (2019)
Six airports
United Kingdom, England, Greater London, London
Heathrow Airport	LHR	London Borough of Hillingdon	Yes	24 km (15 mi) west	80,102,017 (2018)
Gatwick Airport	LGW	Crawley, West Sussex	No	46 km (29 mi) south	46,075,400 (2018)
London Stansted Airport	STN	Stansted Mountfitchet, Uttlesford, Essex	No	48 km (30 mi) northeast	25,902,618 (2017)
Luton Airport	LTN	Luton, Bedfordshire	No	48 km (30 mi) north	16,769,634 (2018)
London City Airport	LCY	London Docklands	Yes	11 km (6.8 mi) east	4,820,292 (2018)
London Southend Airport	SEN	Rochford, Essex	No	69 km (43 mi) east	1,095,914 (2017)
Five airports
United States, California, Greater Los Angeles Area, Los Angeles
Los Angeles International Airport	LAX	Westchester, Los Angeles	Yes	27 km (17 mi) southwest	87,534,384 (2018)
John Wayne Airport	SNA	Santa Ana, California	No	70 km (43 mi) southeast	10,664,038 (2018)
Hollywood Burbank Airport	BUR	Burbank, California	No	25 km (16 mi) north	5,263,972 (2018)
Ontario International Airport	ONT	Ontario, California	No	61 km (38 mi) east	5,115,894 (2018)
Long Beach Airport	LGB	Long Beach, California	No	58 km (36 mi) south	3,884,721 (2018)
Four airports
Australia, Victoria, Melbourne
Melbourne Airport	MEL	Tullamarine, Victoria	Yes	20 km (12 mi) northwest	27,700,000
Avalon Airport	AVV	Avalon, Victoria	No	50 km (31 mi) southwest	1,400,000
Essendon Fields Airport	MEB	Essendon, Victoria	Yes	11 km (6.8 mi) northwest	
Moorabbin Airport	MBW	Mentone, Victoria	Yes	22 km (14 mi) southeast	
France, Île-de-France, Paris
Charles de Gaulle Airport	CDG	Roissy-en-France	No	31 km (19 mi) northeast	72,229,723 (2018)
Orly Airport	ORY	Orly	No	18 km (11 mi) south	33,120,685 (2018)
Beauvais–Tillé Airport	BVA	Tillé	No	90 km (56 mi) north	3,997,856 (2016)
Châlons Vatry Airport	XCR	Vatry	No	147 km (91 mi) east	96,221 (2014)
Germany, North Rhine-Westphalia, Rhine-Ruhr metropolitan region
Düsseldorf Airport	DUS	Lohausen, Düsseldorf	Yes	7 km (4.3 mi) north	21,031,429 (2025)
Cologne Bonn Airport	CGN	Porz, Cologne	Yes	12 km (7.5 mi) southeast of Cologne, 16 km (9.9 mi) northeast of Bonn	10,060,452 (2025)
Dortmund Airport	DTM	Dortmund	Yes	10 km (6.2 mi) east	3,242,429 (2025)
Weeze Airport	NRN	Weeze	No	70 km (43 mi) northwest	2,245,473 (2025)
Russia, Moscow
Sheremetyevo International Airport	SVO	Khimki, Moscow Oblast	No	29 km (18 mi) northwest	34,030,000 (2016)
Domodedovo International Airport	DME	Domodedovo, Moscow Oblast	No	42 km (26 mi) southeast	28,500,000 (2016)
Vnukovo International Airport	VKO	Moscow	Yes	28 km (17 mi) southwest	18,139,000 (2017)
Zhukovsky International Airport	ZIA	Zhukovsky, Moscow Oblast	No	40 km (25 mi) southeast	1,161,633 (2018)
Japan, Tokyo Metropolis
Haneda Airport	HND	Ōta, Tokyo	Yes	14 km (8.7 mi) south	87,130,000 (2018)
Narita International Airport	NRT	Narita, Chiba	No	60 km (37 mi) east	42,600,000 (2018)
Ibaraki Airport	IBR	Omitama, Ibaraki	No	80 km (50 mi) northeast	538,227 (2015)
Chōfu Airport	CJH	Chōfu, Tokyo	Yes	15 km (9.3 mi) west	94,816 (2015)
Sweden, Stockholm County, Stockholm
Stockholm Arlanda Airport	ARN	Sigtuna Municipality	No	37 km (23 mi) north	16,962,416
Stockholm Skavsta Airport	NYO	Nyköping Municipality	No	100 km (62 mi) south	2,524,633
Stockholm Bromma Airport	BMA	Bromma borough	Yes	7.4 km (4.6 mi) northwest	2,488,779
Stockholm Västerås Airport	VST	Västerås Municipality	No	100 km (62 mi) west	174,496
United Arab Emirates, Dubai
Dubai International Airport	DXB	Al Garhoud, Dubai	Yes	4.7 km (2.9 mi) east	92,300,000 (2024)
Al Maktoum International Airport	DWC	Dubai South, Dubai	Yes	37 kilometres (23 mi) southwest	461,000 (2023)
Sharjah International Airport	SHJ	Sharjah	No	13.4 kilometers (8.3 miles) northeast	17,100,000 (2024)
Ras Al Khaimah International Airport	RKT	Ras Al Khaimah	No	83 kilometers (51.8 miles) northeast	661,765 (2024)
United States, California, San Francisco Bay Area
San Francisco International Airport	SFO	San Mateo County, California	No	18.3 km (11.4 mi) south	57,793,313 (2018)
Norman Y. Mineta San Jose International Airport	SJC	San Jose, California	No	63 km (39 mi) southeast	14,319,292 (2018)
Oakland International Airport	OAK	Alameda County, California	No	19 km (11.8 mi) southeast	13,594,251 (2018)
Charles M. Schulz–Sonoma County Airport	STS	Sonoma County, California	No	87 km (54 mi) northwest	238,917 (2014)
United States, Massachusetts, Greater Boston, Boston
Boston Logan International Airport	BOS	Boston	Yes	4 km (2.5 mi) east	40,941,925 (2018)
Rhode Island T. F. Green International Airport	PVD	Warwick, Rhode Island	No	95 km (59 mi) south	3,566,769
Manchester–Boston Regional Airport	MHT	Manchester, New Hampshire	No	81 km (50 mi) northwest	2,814,125
Worcester Regional Airport	ORH	Worcester, Massachusetts	No	76 km (47 mi) west	107,000

== Three airports ==
- Brazil, Rio de Janeiro
  - Rio de Janeiro/Galeão International Airport
  - Santos Dumont Airport
  - Jacarepaguá Airport
- Brazil, São Paulo
  - São Paulo–Congonhas Airport
  - São Paulo/Guarulhos International Airport
  - Viracopos International Airport
- Canada, Toronto, Ontario
  - Billy Bishop Toronto City Airport
  - John C. Munro Hamilton International Airport
  - Toronto Pearson International Airport
- Denmark, Copenhagen/Sweden, Malmö
  - Copenhagen Airport
  - Malmö Airport
  - Roskilde Airport
- Egypt, Cairo
  - Cairo International Airport
  - Capital International Airport
  - Sphinx International Airport
- India, Delhi
  - Hindon Airport
  - Indira Gandhi International Airport
  - Noida International Airport
- Italy, Milan (Airports of Milan)
  - Milan Bergamo Airport
  - Milan Linate Airport
  - Milan Malpensa Airport
- Japan, Osaka
  - Itami Airport
  - Kansai International Airport
  - Kobe Airport
- Mexico, Mexico City
  - Mexico City International Airport
  - Felipe Ángeles International Airport
  - Toluca International Airport
- Panama, Panama City
  - Marcos A. Gelabert International Airport
  - Panamá Pacífico International Airport
  - Tocumen International Airport
- Poland, Warsaw
  - Warsaw Chopin Airport
  - Warsaw Modlin Airport
  - Warsaw Radom Airport
- Spain, Barcelona
  - Girona–Costa Brava Airport
  - Josep Tarradellas Barcelona–El Prat Airport
  - Reus Airport
- United States, Chicago, Illinois
  - Chicago Midway International Airport
  - Chicago O'Hare International Airport
  - Chicago Rockford International Airport
- United States, Dallas, Texas
  - Dallas Fort Worth International Airport
  - Dallas Love Field
  - McKinney National Airport (begins 11 November 2026)
- United States, Miami, Florida
  - Miami International Airport
  - Fort Lauderdale–Hollywood International Airport
  - President Donald J. Trump International Airport
- United States, Orlando, Florida
  - Melbourne Orlando International Airport
  - Orlando International Airport
  - Orlando Sanford International Airport
- United States, Philadelphia, Pennsylvania
  - Atlantic City International Airport
  - Philadelphia International Airport
  - Wilmington Airport
- United States, Phoenix, Arizona
  - Phoenix–Mesa Gateway Airport
  - Phoenix Sky Harbor International Airport
  - Scottsdale Airport
- United States, San Diego, California/Mexico, Tijuana, Baja California
  - McClellan–Palomar Airport
  - San Diego International Airport
  - Tijuana International Airport (via CBX Terminal)
- United States, Seattle, Washington
  - King County International Airport
  - Paine Field
  - Seattle–Tacoma International Airport
- United States, Tampa, Florida
  - Sarasota–Bradenton International Airport
  - St. Pete–Clearwater International Airport
  - Tampa International Airport
- United States, Washington, D.C.
  - Baltimore/Washington International Thurgood Marshall Airport
  - Ronald Reagan Washington National Airport
  - Washington Dulles International Airport

== Two airports ==
- Argentina, Buenos Aires
  - Aeroparque Jorge Newbery
  - Ministro Pistarini International Airport
- Australia, Sydney, New South Wales
  - Sydney Airport
  - Western Sydney Airport
- Belgium, Brussels
  - Brussels Airport
  - Brussels South Charleroi Airport
- Belize, Belize City
  - Belize City Municipal Airport
  - Philip S. W. Goldson International Airport
- Bolivia, Santa Cruz
  - El Trompillo Airport
  - Viru Viru International Airport
- Brazil, Belo Horizonte
  - Belo Horizonte/Pampulha – Carlos Drummond de Andrade Airport
  - Tancredo Neves International Airport
- Canada, Montréal, Quebec
  - Montréal–Trudeau International Airport
  - MET – Montreal Metropolitan Airport
- Canada, Vancouver, British Columbia
  - Abbotsford International Airport
  - Vancouver International Airport
- China, Beijing
  - Beijing Capital International Airport
  - Beijing Daxing International Airport
- China, Chengdu, Sichuan
  - Chengdu Shuangliu International Airport
  - Chengdu Tianfu International Airport
- China, Shanghai
  - Shanghai Hongqiao International Airport
  - Shanghai Pudong International Airport
- China, Xiamen, Fujian/Taiwan, Kinmen
  - Kinmen Airport
  - Xiamen Gaoqi International Airport
- China, Zunyi, Guizhou
  - Zunyi Maotai Airport
  - Zunyi Xinzhou Airport
- Colombia, Medellín
  - Olaya Herrera Airport
  - José María Córdova International Airport
- Democratic Republic of the Congo, Kinshasa
  - N'djili Airport
  - N'Dolo Airport
- Costa Rica, San José
  - Juan Santamaría International Airport
  - Tobías Bolaños International Airport
- Dominica, Roseau
  - Canefield Airport
  - Douglas–Charles Airport
- Dominican Republic, Samaná
  - Arroyo Barril Airport
  - Samaná El Catey International Airport
- Dominican Republic, Santo Domingo
  - La Isabela International Airport
  - Las Américas International Airport
- Guyana, Georgetown
  - Cheddi Jagan International Airport
  - Eugene F. Correia International Airport
- Germany, Frankfurt
  - Frankfurt Airport
  - Hahn Airport
- Iceland, Reykjavík
  - Keflavík International Airport
  - Reykjavík Airport
- India, Mumbai
  - Chhatrapati Shivaji Maharaj International Airport
  - Navi Mumbai International Airport
- Indonesia, Bandung
  - Husein Sastranegara Airport
  - Kertajati International Airport
- Indonesia, Jakarta
  - Halim Perdanakusuma International Airport
  - Soekarno–Hatta International Airport
- Indonesia, Yogyakarta
  - Adisutjipto Airport
  - Yogyakarta International Airport
- Iran, Tehran
  - Imam Khomeini International Airport
  - Mehrabad International Airport
- Italy, Rome
  - Rome Ciampino Airport
  - Rome Fiumicino Airport
- Italy, Turin
  - Cuneo International Airport
  - Turin Airport
- Italy, Venice
  - Treviso Airport
  - Venice Marco Polo Airport
- Japan, Nagoya
  - Chubu Centrair International Airport
  - Nagoya Airfield
- Japan, Sapporo
  - New Chitose Airport
  - Okadama Airport
- Kenya, Nairobi
  - Jomo Kenyatta International Airport
  - Wilson Airport
- Liberia, Monrovia
  - Roberts International Airport
  - Spriggs Payne Airport
- Libya, Tripoli
  - Mitiga International Airport
  - Tripoli International Airport
- Malaysia, Kuala Lumpur
  - Kuala Lumpur International Airport
  - Sultan Abdul Aziz Shah Airport
- Mexico, Los Cabos, Baja California Sur
  - Los Cabos International Airport
  - Cabo San Lucas International Airport
- Mexico, Mexicali, Baja California/United States, Imperial, California
  - Imperial County Airport
  - Mexicali International Airport
- Mexico, Monterrey, Nuevo León
  - Del Norte International Airport
  - Monterrey International Airport
- Mexico, Matamoros, Tamaulipas/United States, Brownsville, Texas
  - Brownsville/South Padre Island International Airport
  - Matamoros International Airport
- Mexico, Reynosa, Tamaulipas/United States, McAllen, Texas
  - McAllen Miller International Airport
  - General Lucio Blanco International Airport
- Namibia, Windhoek
  - Eros Airport
  - Hosea Kutako International Airport
- New Caledonia, Nouméa
  - La Tontouta International Airport
  - Magenta Airport
- Nigeria, Port Harcourt, Rivers State
  - Port Harcourt International Airport
  - Port Harcourt City Airport
- Norway, Oslo
  - Oslo Airport, Gardermoen
  - Sandefjord Airport, Torp
- Philippines, Manila
  - Ninoy Aquino International Airport
  - Clark International Airport
- Portugal, Lisbon
  - Cascais Municipal Aerodrome
  - Humberto Delgado Airport
- Puerto Rico, San Juan
  - Fernando Luis Ribas Dominicci Airport
  - Luis Muñoz Marín International Airport
- Romania, Bucharest
  - Bucharest Henri Coandă International Airport
  - Bucharest Băneasa Aurel Vlaicu International Airport
- Russia, Krasnoyarsk
  - Krasnoyarsk Cheremshanka Airport
  - Yemelyanovo International Airport
- Russia, Ulyanovsk
  - Ulyanovsk Baratayevka Airport
  - Ulyanovsk Vostochny Airport
- Saint Lucia, Castries
  - George F. L. Charles Airport
  - Hewanorra International Airport
- Singapore
  - Changi Airport
  - Seletar Airport
- South Africa, Johannesburg
  - Lanseria International Airport
  - O. R. Tambo International Airport
- South Korea, Gwangju
  - Gwangju Airport
  - Muan International Airport
- South Korea, Seoul
  - Gimpo International Airport
  - Incheon International Airport
- Spain, Santa Cruz de Tenerife
  - Tenerife North–Ciudad de La Laguna Airport
  - Tenerife South Airport
- Sri Lanka, Colombo
  - Bandaranaike International Airport
  - Ratmalana Airport
- Suriname, Paramaribo
  - Johan Adolf Pengel International Airport
  - Zorg en Hoop Airport
- Taiwan, Taipei
  - Songshan Airport
  - Taoyuan International Airport
- Thailand, Bangkok
  - Don Mueang International Airport
  - Suvarnabhumi Airport
- Turkey, Antalya
  - Antalya Airport
  - Gazipaşa–Alanya Airport
- Turkey, Istanbul
  - Istanbul Airport
  - Sabiha Gökçen International Airport
- Turkey, Muğla
  - Dalaman Airport
  - Milas–Bodrum Airport
- Ukraine, Kyiv
  - Boryspil International Airport
  - Igor Sikorsky Kyiv International Airport (Zhuliany)
- United Kingdom, Belfast, Northern Ireland
  - Belfast International Airport
  - George Best Belfast City Airport
- United Kingdom, Glasgow, Scotland
  - Glasgow Airport
  - Glasgow Prestwick Airport
- United Kingdom, Lerwick, Scotland
  - Sumburgh Airport
  - Tingwall Airport
- United States, Anchorage, Alaska
  - Merrill Field
  - Ted Stevens Anchorage International Airport
- United States, Buffalo, New York
  - Buffalo Niagara International Airport
  - Niagara Falls International Airport
- United States, Charlotte, North Carolina
  - Charlotte Douglas International Airport
  - Concord–Padgett Regional Airport
- United States, Cleveland, Ohio
  - Akron–Canton Airport
  - Cleveland Hopkins International Airport
- United States, Columbus, Ohio
  - John Glenn Columbus International Airport
  - Rickenbacker International Airport
- United States, El Paso, Texas/Mexico, Ciudad Juárez, Chihuahua
  - Ciudad Juárez International Airport
  - El Paso International Airport
- United States, Houston, Texas
  - George Bush Intercontinental Airport
  - William P. Hobby Airport
- United States, Laredo, Texas/Mexico, Nuevo Laredo, Tamaulipas
  - Laredo International Airport
  - Nuevo Laredo International Airport
- United States, Pittsburgh, Pennsylvania
  - Arnold Palmer Regional Airport
  - Pittsburgh International Airport
- United States, St. Louis, Missouri
  - MidAmerica St. Louis Airport
  - St. Louis Lambert International Airport
- United States, Virginia Beach-Norfolk, Virginia
  - Newport News/Williamsburg International Airport
  - Norfolk International Airport
- Vietnam, Ho Chi Minh City
  - Long Thanh International Airport (begins 1 December 2026)
  - Tan Son Nhat International Airport

== See also ==
- Airport slot
- List of defunct international airports
- List of busiest city airport systems by passenger traffic
