= Airports of Milan =

City airport system

Milan airport system
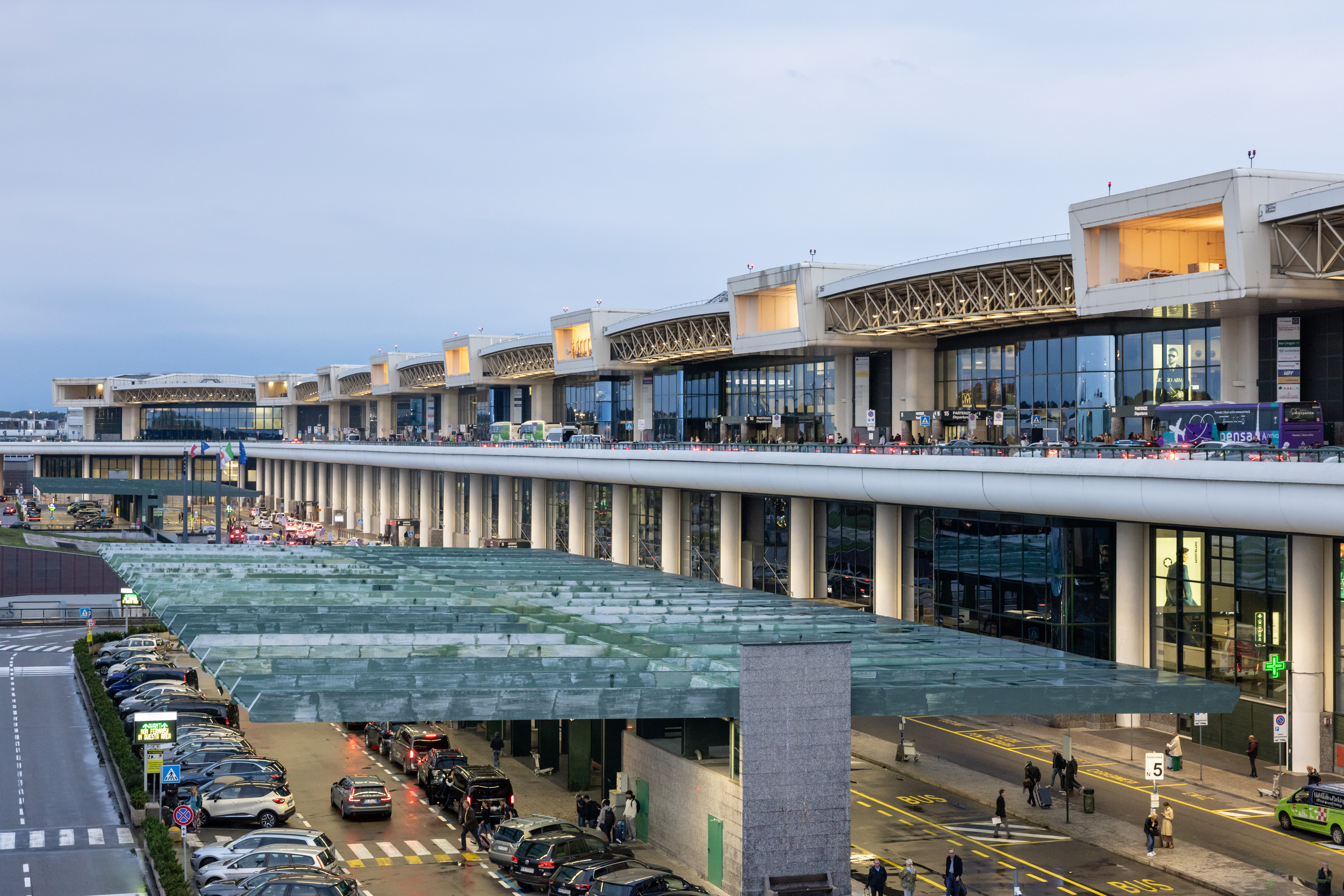
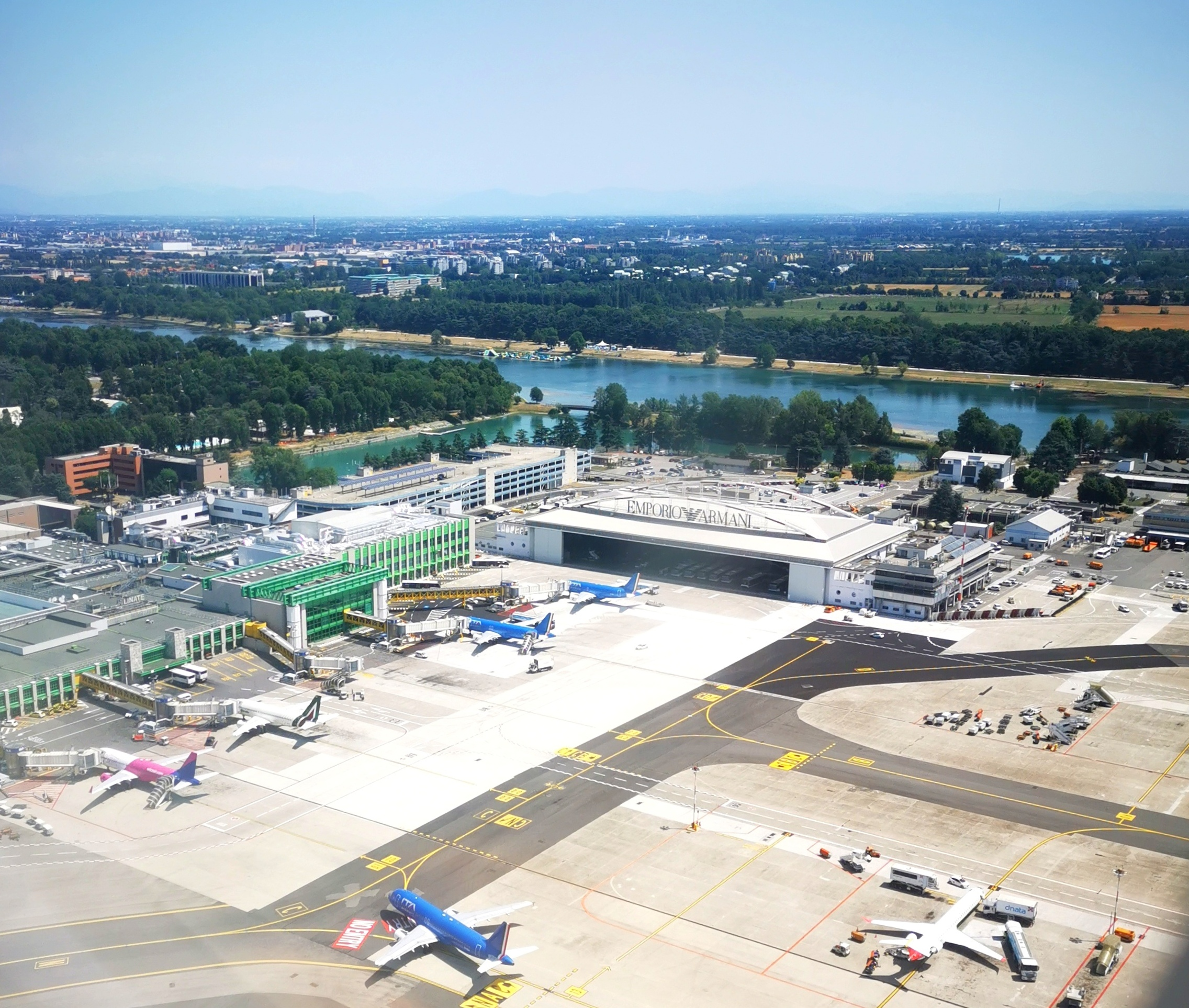
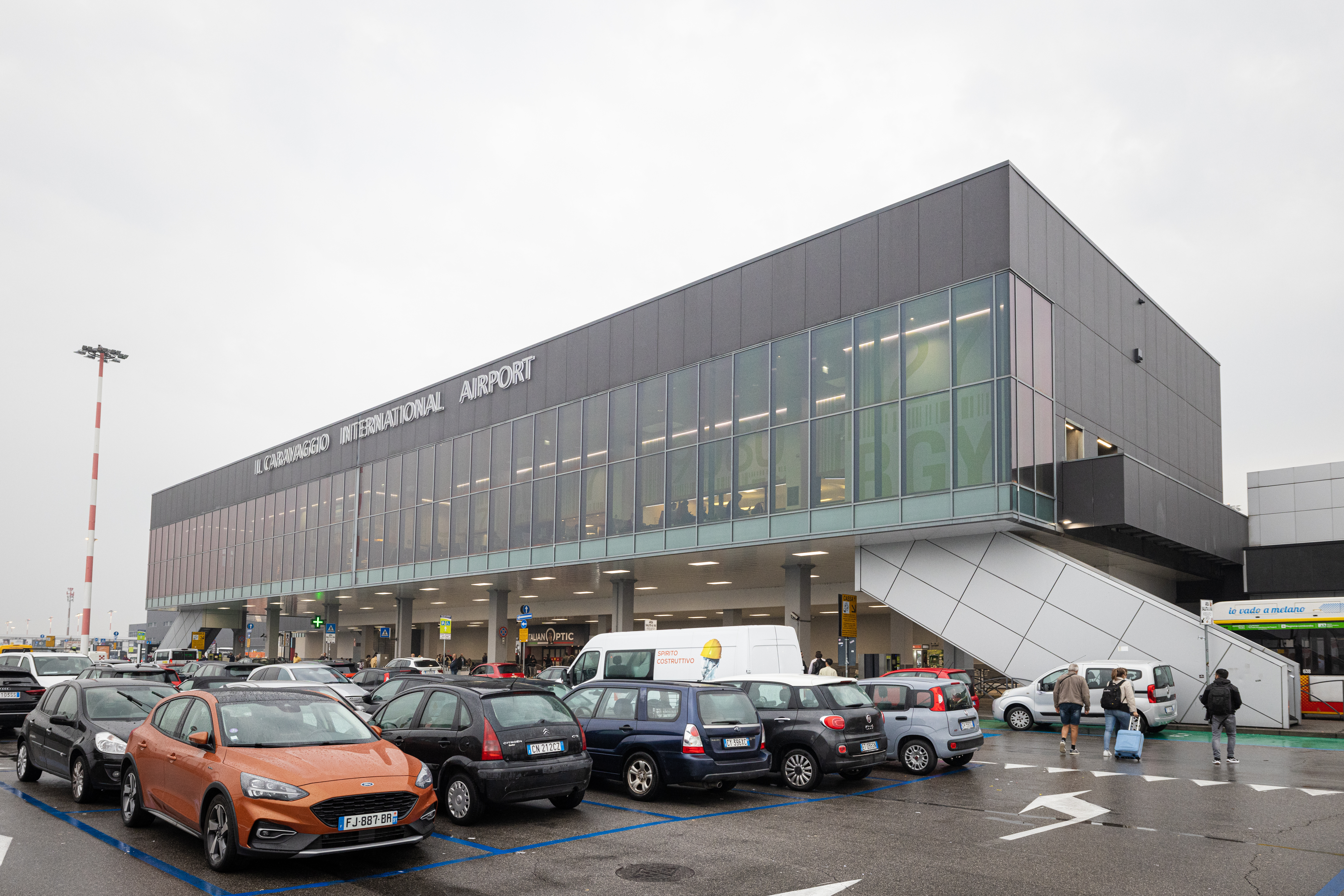
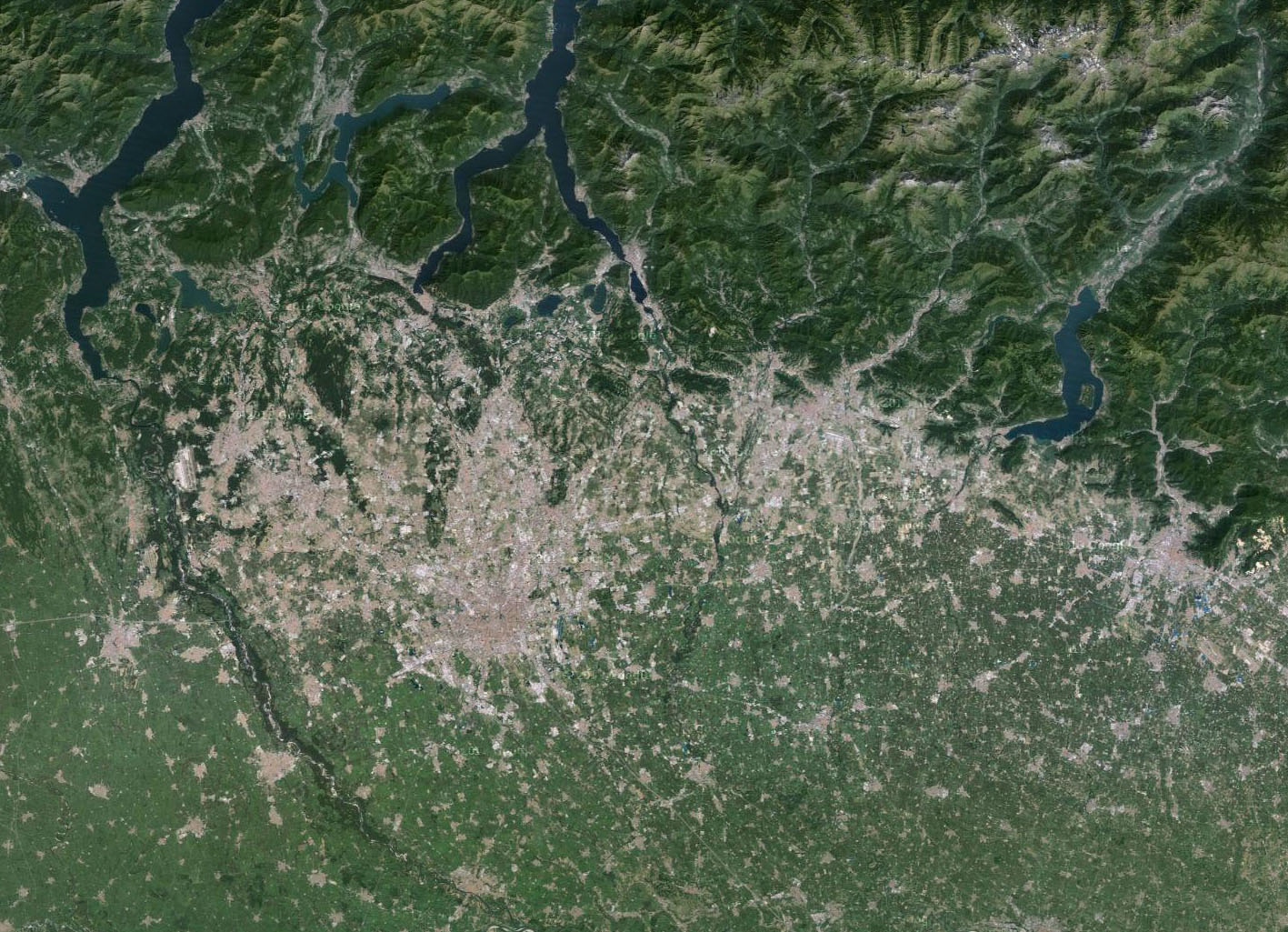
- Malpensa Airport Linate Airport Bergamo Airport Milan metropolitan area

- Airports serving the Milan metropolitan area
- Location: Milan metropolitan area, Lombardy, Italy
- Total Passengers: 59,455,325 (2025)
- IATA Code: MIL
- Operators: SEA S.p.A. (MXP, LIN); SACBO S.p.A. (BGY)

System components
- Malpensa (MXP); Bergamo Orio al Serio (BGY); Linate (LIN)

The Milan metropolitan area in Lombardy, Italy, is served by three international airports. Together, these airports form the Milan airport system, the busiest airport system in Italy by passenger numbers. Additionally, the city has one civil airport.

In 2025, the three international airports handled a combined total of 59.5 million passengers, surpassing the Rome airport system (Fiumicino and Ciampino) by approximately 4.2 million passengers. The collective IATA airport code for the Milan metropolitan area is MIL.

== History ==
The aviation history of Milan dates back to the early 20th century with the Taliedo airfield, established in 1910. It served as one of Italy's first airports and the manufacturing site for Caproni aircraft but was eventually decommissioned as the city expanded.

- 1930s–1950s: To replace Taliedo, Linate Airport was inaugurated in 1937 as the city's primary commercial hub. However, as jet aviation emerged, the need for longer runways led to the commercial development of Malpensa (originally a wartime airfield), which officially opened to civil traffic on 21 November 1948.
- The Malpensa 2000 Project: In the late 1990s, the Italian government launched a massive project to transform Malpensa into a major European hub. This involved the construction of the new Terminal 1 and a complete overhaul of the runway system to serve as the primary base for the national carrier, Alitalia, which moved its main hub there in 1998.
- The "de-hubbing" (2008): the strategy shifted dramatically on 31 March 2008, when Alitalia decided to retreat to Rome Fiumicino ("de-hubbing"), leaving Malpensa with a sudden void in traffic. This forced the system to pivot toward a "multi-carrier" strategy, opening the door to low-cost carriers like easyJet at Malpensa and Ryanair at Bergamo.
- Rise of Bergamo: simultaneously, Bergamo transformed from a minor military airfield into a low-cost giant. Ryanair established its first Italian base there in 2003, capturing the explosive demand for point-to-point leisure travel and driving the airport's growth from 1.2 million to nearly 17 million passengers in a little over two decades.

== International airports ==
The system is managed by two distinct but interconnected operators. SEA S.p.A. (Società per Azioni Esercizi Aeroportuali) manages Malpensa and Linate and is majority-owned by the Municipality of Milan. SACBO S.p.A. operates Bergamo; however, SEA holds a 31% minority stake in SACBO, ensuring strategic coordination across the network.

=== Malpensa (MXP) ===
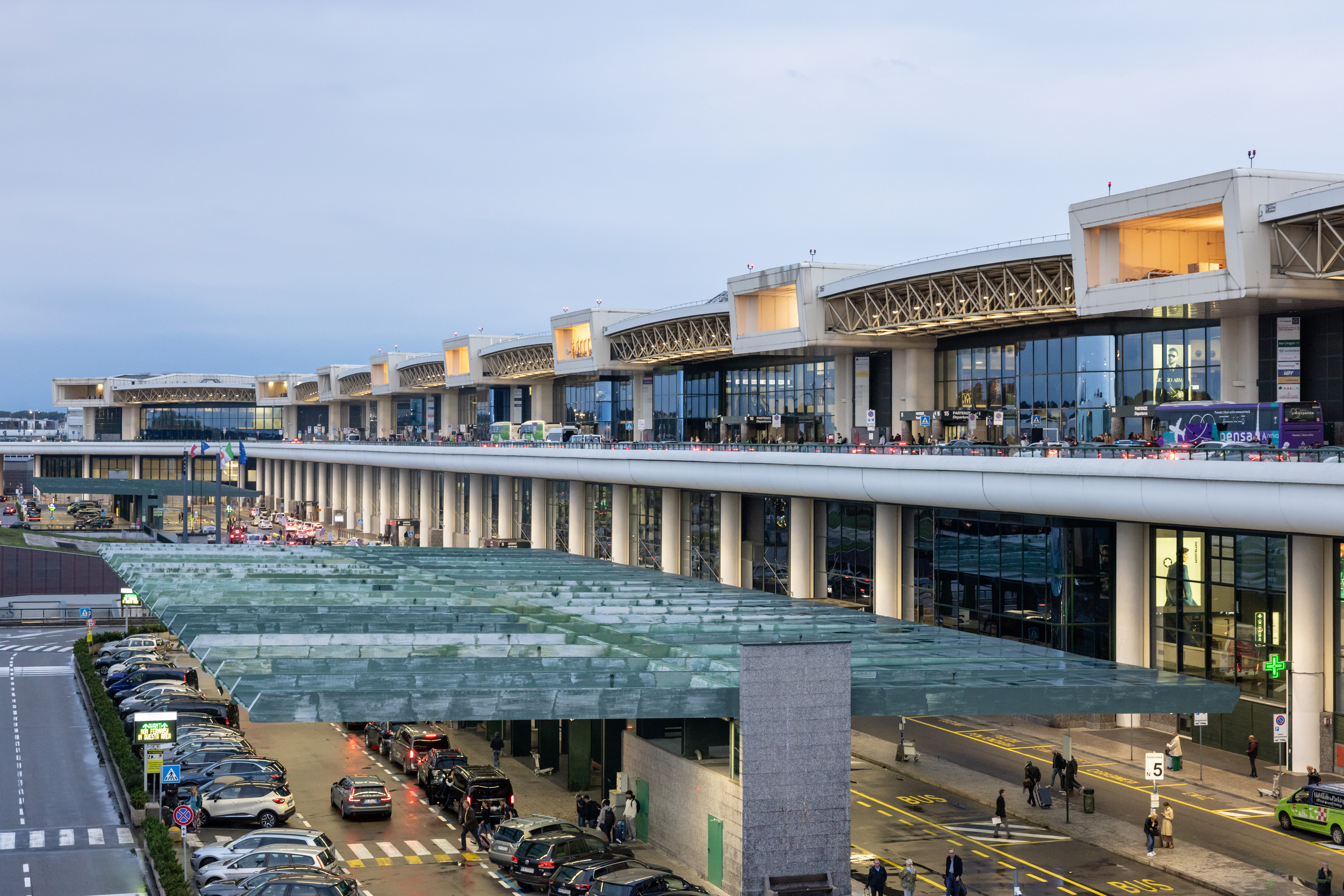
Malpensa is the largest airport in northern Italy and a major intercontinental gateway.

Located in the province of Varese, Malpensa is by far the largest of Milan's airports and is considered the main gateway into Northern Italy for non-European visitors. Malpensa has two terminals and two parallel runways capable of handling all aircraft types, including the Airbus A380. Due to its location approximately 49 km (30 miles) northwest of the city, it serves a vast catchment area extending into Switzerland and Piedmont.

As of 2025, Malpensa Airport handled 31.4 million passengers and was the 21st-busiest airport in Europe in terms of passengers and second-busiest airport in Italy in terms of passengers. It operates as a "hybrid hub": Terminal 1 hosts legacy carriers and long-haul flights (including Emirates, Delta, Cathay Pacific and Singapore Airlines), while Terminal 2 is dedicated exclusively to easyJet, making it the airline's largest base in continental Europe.

Uniquely among Italian airports, Malpensa plays a critical industrial role; it processes over 65% of Italy's air cargo (763,118 tonnes in 2025), supported by a dedicated "Cargo City" that serves the manufacturing heart of Lombardy. The airport is connected to the city center by the Malpensa Express rail service, which links to Milan Cadorna, Milan Porta Garibaldi and Milan Central stations.

=== Linate (LIN) ===
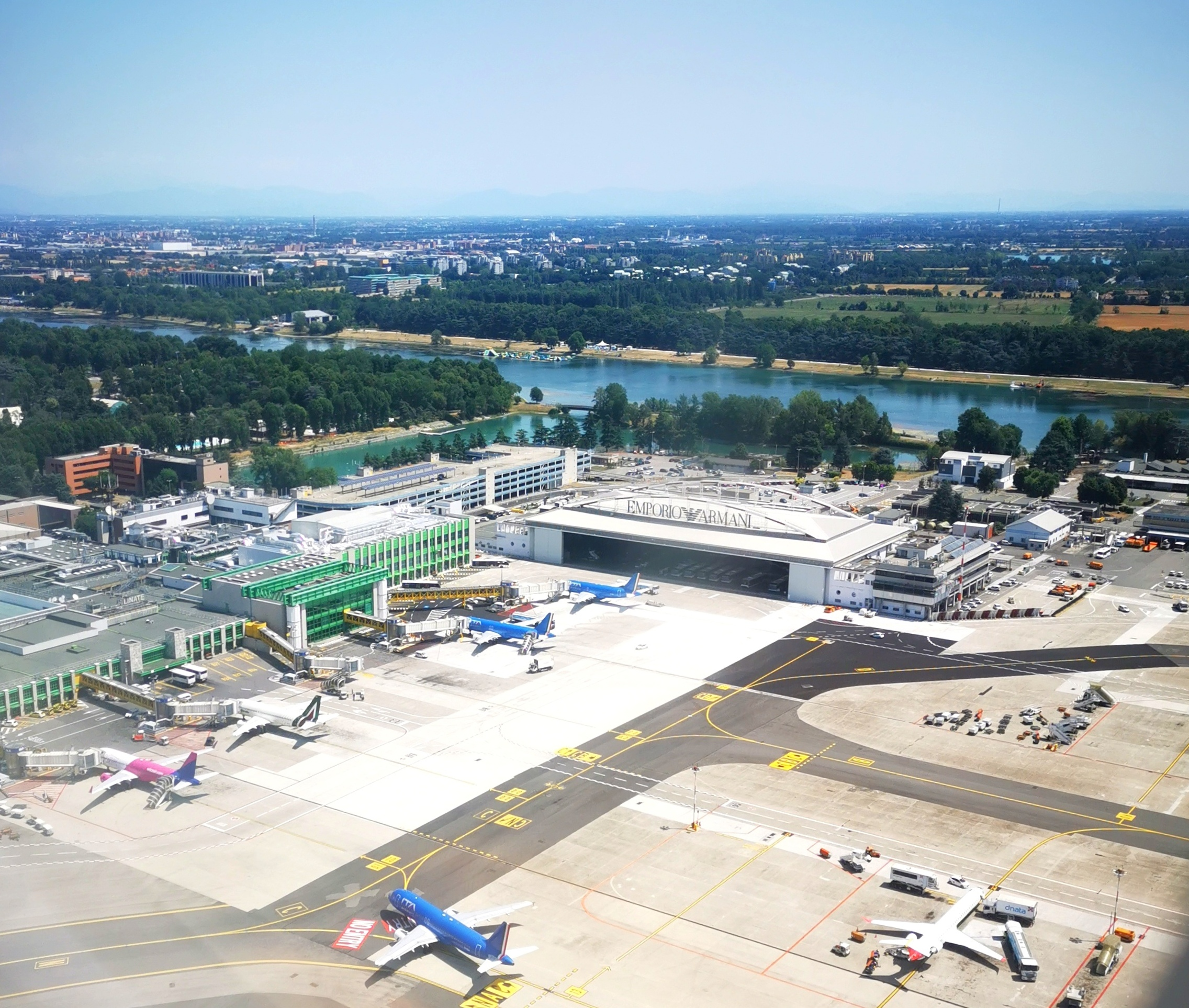
Linate is the city's preferred airport for business travelers due to its proximity to the center.

Located in Segrate and Peschiera Borromeo, Linate is situated just 7 km (4.3 miles) east of Milan's city center, making it the closest airport to the Duomo. Similar to London City Airport, its proximity to the urban core limits its size—the airport has a single short runway (2,442 m) and acts as a specialized facility for high-yield business traffic.

Its operations are strictly regulated by the "Bersani Decree", which caps hourly movements to protect the hub status of Malpensa and restricts destinations primarily to EU capitals and major domestic cities. Despite these constraints, it handled 11.1 million passengers in 2025. The airport's accessibility was revolutionized in late 2024 with the full opening of the M4 Metro line, connecting the terminal to the city center (San Babila) in just 12 minutes.

Following the 2025 merger between Lufthansa and ITA Airways, Linate saw a significant shift in its carrier mix. To comply with EU antitrust rulings, a portfolio of "remedy slots" was surrendered to competitors like easyJet and Volotea, opening the airport to increased competition on key business routes for the first time in decades.

=== Bergamo (BGY) ===
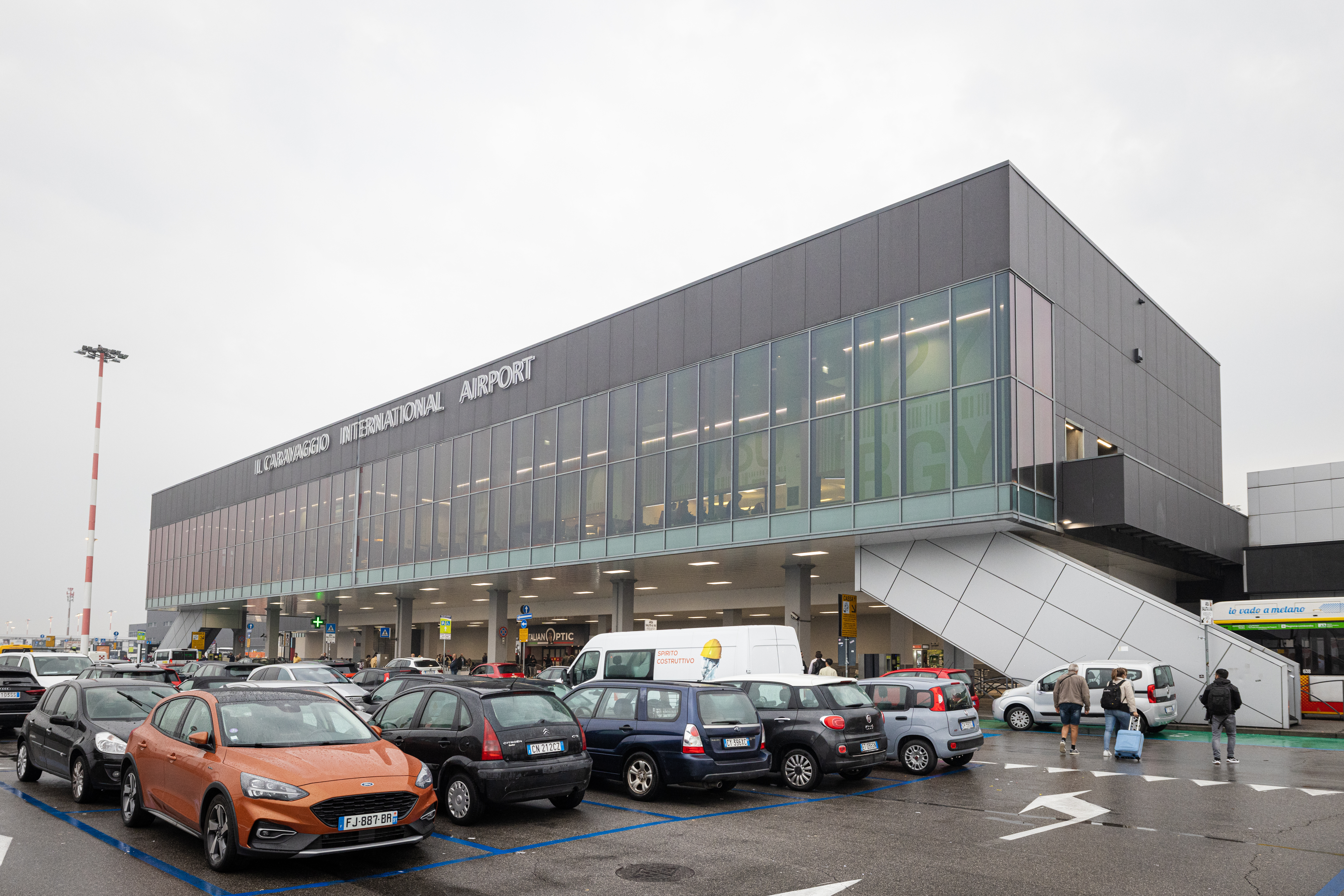
Milan Bergamo is the third-busiest airport in Italy and a major hub for low-cost carriers.

Located in Orio al Serio, Bergamo is the third-busiest airport in Italy and the secondary pillar of the airport city system. Situated 45 km (28 miles) northeast of Milan, it functions similarly to London Gatwick or Stansted as a massive point-to-point node. It is the primary continental hub for Ryanair, which accounts for the vast majority of the airport's traffic.

In 2025, Bergamo handled 16.94 million passengers and 24,531 tonnes of cargo. Unlike Malpensa and Linate, which are managed by SEA Group, Bergamo is operated by SACBO S.p.A., though the two operators share cross-ownership to ensure strategic coordination. The airport is currently undergoing a major infrastructure upgrade to build a direct rail link to the Milan railway network, scheduled to open for the 2026 Winter Olympics. Until then, it relies on an extensive network of coach buses connecting it to the center of Milan.

== Traffic and statistics ==
=== Traffic statistics ===
Commercial airports of the Milan system
Airport	IATA	ICAO	Passengers (2025)	Change 2024–25	Cargo (tonnes, 2025)	Change 2024–25	Movements (2025)	Change 2024–25	Rail connection
Malpensa	MXP	LIMC	31,385,585	▲8.6%	763,118.5	▲4.3%	226,321	▲5.5%	Yes (Malpensa Express)
Linate	LIN	LIML	11,131,764	▲4.5%	1,772.2	▼16.5%	122,281	▲3.6%	Yes (Metro M4)
Bergamo	BGY	LIME	16,937,976	▼2.4%	24,530.9	▲6.8%	104,665	▼4.8%	Under construction (activation date: 2026)
Total	—N/a	—N/a	59,455,325	▲4.5%	789,421.6	▲4.3%	453,267	▲2.4%	—N/a

=== Traffic charts ===
Passenger traffic 2025 (millions)
Airport	Passengers (millions)
Malpensa	31.4
Bergamo	16.9
Linate	11.1

Cargo traffic 2025 (tonnes)
Airport	Tonnes
Malpensa	763,118
Bergamo	24,531
Linate	1,772

Market share by passenger numbers (2025)
1. Malpensa (MXP) (53.0%)
2. Bergamo (BGY) (28.0%)
3. Linate (LIN) (19.0%)

== Public transport ==
The integration of the airports with Milan's rail and metro network saw significant improvements in the mid-2020s.

Malpensa is connected to Milan railway stations by rail via the Malpensa Express. As for Linate, the M4 line (Blue line) of the Milan Metro was fully completed in October 2024, connecting the airport to the city center (San Babila) in 12 minutes. Regarding Bergamo, a rail link connecting the airport terminal to the Bergamo-Milan railway line is under construction and scheduled to open in 2026, integrating the airport to the Milan S Lines. Currently, the airport is served by extensive bus coach services.

== Civil airport ==
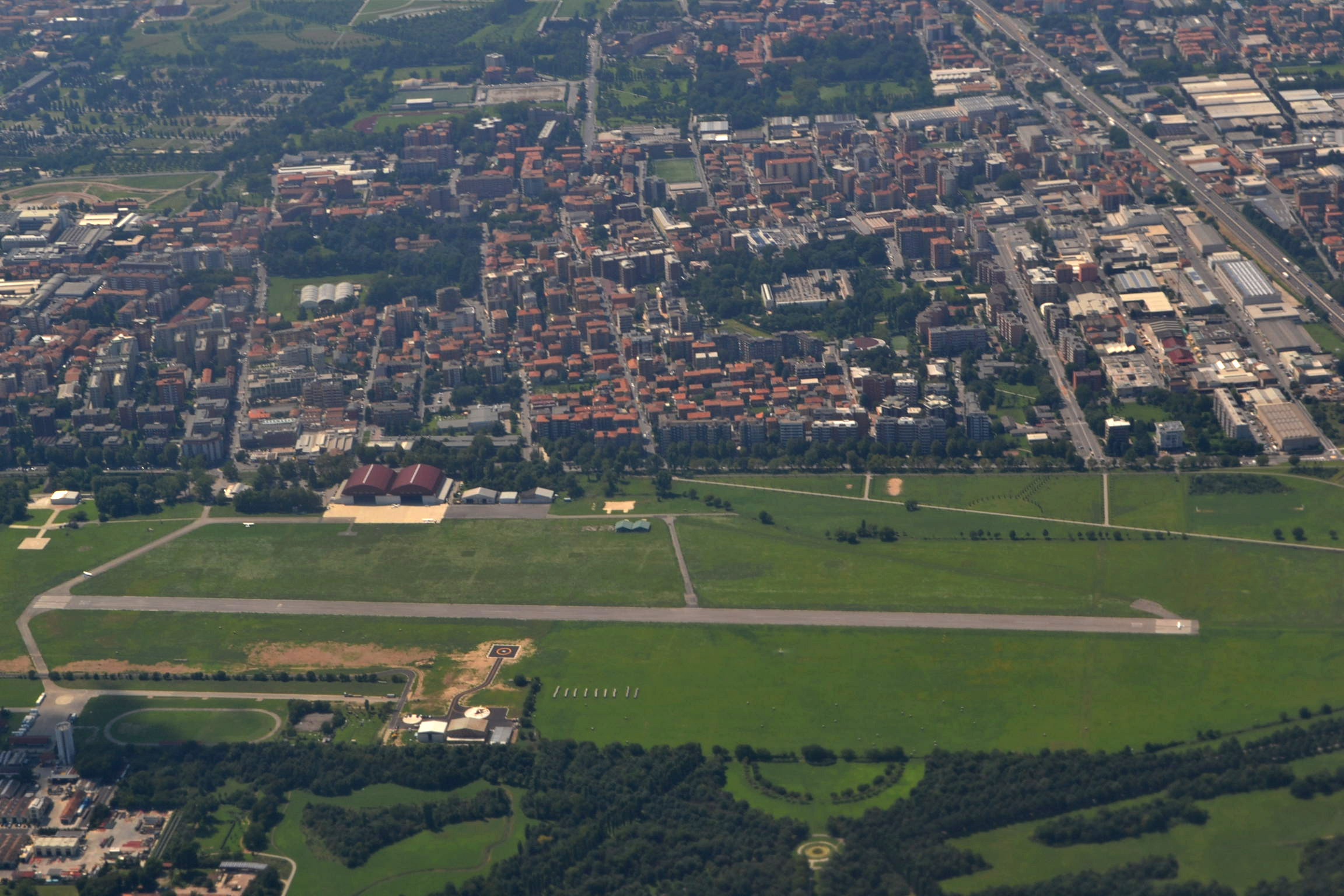
Bresso is the historic home of the Aero Club Milano and serves general aviation.

Located in the municipality of Bresso within the North Milan Park (Parco Nord). Unlike the commercial hubs, Bresso is dedicated exclusively to general aviation and does not handle scheduled passenger traffic.

Historically the site of the Breda aircraft factory, it has been the headquarters of the Aero Club Milano since 1960. The airport features a single 1,080-metre (3,540 ft) asphalt runway (18/36) and is used for flight training, private touring flights, and air taxi services. It also serves as a base for the regional helicopter emergency medical service (Elisoccorso).

== See also ==
- List of airports in Italy
- Transport in Milan
- List of cities with more than one commercial airport
- List of busiest city airport systems by passenger traffic
