= Milan Linate Airport =

Regional airport serving Milan, Italy

Milan Linate Airport Aeroporto di Milano-Linate "Enrico Forlanini"

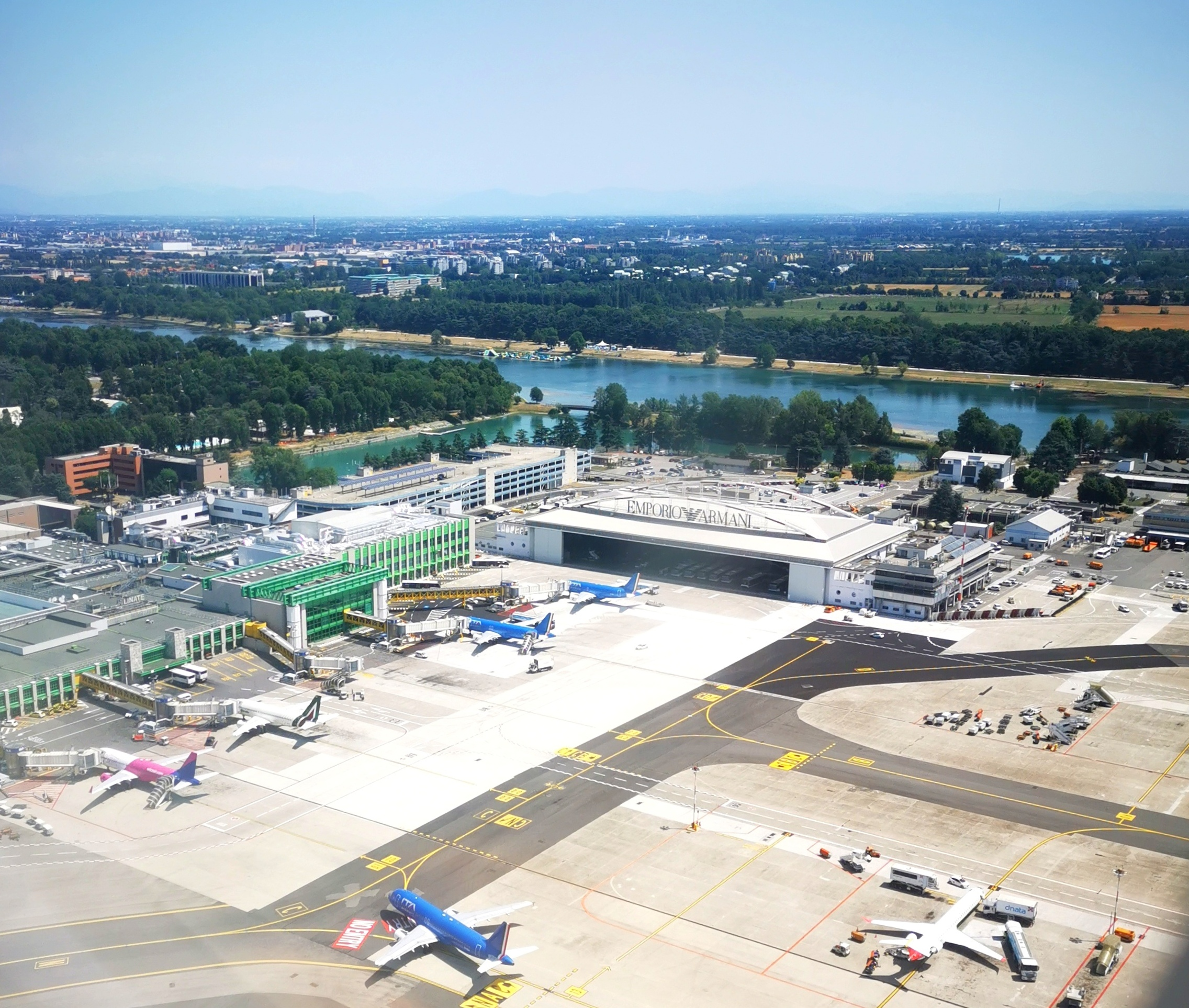
- IATA: LIN; ICAO: LIML

Summary
- Airport type: Public
- Owner: SEA S.p.A
- Operator: SEA – Aeroporti di Milano
- Serves: Milan metropolitan area
- Location: Segrate and Peschiera Borromeo, Lombardy, Italy
- Opened: 21 October 1937; 89 years ago
- Focus city for: ITA Airways
- Operating base for: easyJet
- Elevation AMSL: 353 ft (108 m)
- Coordinates: 45°26′58″N 009°16′42″E
- Website: www.milanolinate-airport.com/en

Map
- Location of airport on map of Milan LIN/LIML (Lombardy) LIN/LIML (Italy)

Runways
Direction	Length		Surface
Direction	m	ft	Surface
17/35	2,442	8,012	Asphalt

Helipads
Number	Length		Surface
Number	m	ft	Surface
H1	28	92	Asphalt

Statistics (2024)
- Passengers: 10 650 990
- Passenger change 23-24: ▲13%
- Movements: 118 060
- Movements change 23-24: ▲6.1%
- Cargo (tons): 2 123
- Cargo change 23-24: ▲1,4%
- Source: AIP at EUROCONTROL; Statistics from Assaeroporti

Milan Linate Airport (IATA: LIN, ICAO: LIML) is a city airport located in Milan, the second-largest city and largest urban area of Italy. It served 10.6 million passengers and recorded 118,060 aircraft movements in 2024, making it one of the busiest airports in Italy. It is the third-busiest airport in the Milan metropolitan area in terms of passenger numbers, after Malpensa and Bergamo, and the second busiest in terms of aircraft movements.

Together with Milan Malpensa Airport and Milan Bergamo Airport, they form the Milan airport system with 56.9 million passengers in 2024, the largest airport system in Italy by number of passengers.

== History ==
=== Early years ===
The airport was built next to Idroscalo of Milan in the 1930s when Taliedo Airport, located 1 km (0.62 mi) from the southern border of Milan and one of the world's first aerodromes and airports, became too small for commercial traffic. Linate was completely rebuilt in the 1950s and again in the 1980s.

Its name comes from the small village where it is located in the town of Peschiera Borromeo. Its official name is Airport Enrico Forlanini, after the Italian inventor and aeronautical pioneer born in Milan. Linate airport buildings are located in the Segrate Municipality, and the field is located for a large part in the Peschiera Borromeo Municipality.

=== Development since 2000 ===
Since 2001, because of Linate's close proximity to the centre of Milan – only 7 km (4 mi) east of the city centre, compared with Malpensa, which is 41 km (25 mi) northwest of the city centre – its capacity has been reduced by law from 32 slots per hour (technical capacity) down to 22 slots per hour (politically decided capacity) and only domestic or international flights within the EU or to the United Kingdom have been allowed. That year, 2001, also saw a major accident at Linate with many illegal and non-ICAO-regulation practices (Note: For instance, according to an English language pdf file titled "Milan Linate runway incursion", October 2001" hosted in http://www.icao.int, it pinpointed that ICAO Annex 14 was not complied; in addition ICAO Annex 1 was not fully complied.) and layouts part of its then operation.

From 27 July to 27 October 2019, Linate was closed for runway resurfacing and terminal upgrades. The latter project is expected to continue after the airport's reopening, concluding some time in 2021. During this closure, most flights were rerouted to Malpensa, displacing approximately 2.5 million passengers.

In July 2023, Linate Airport was named Europe's Best Airport in the 5–10 Million Passenger category by the Airport Council International. Also as of 2023, the airport had received level 4+ of the Airport Carbon Accreditation.

== Facilities ==
=== Terminal ===
Linate Airport features one three-story passenger terminal building. The ground level contains the check-in and separate baggage reclaim facilities as well as service counters and a secondary departure gate area for bus-boarding. The first floor features the main departure area with several shops, restaurants and service facilities. The second floor is used for office space.

=== Apron and runway ===
The terminal building features five aircraft stands, all of which are equipped with jet-bridges. Several more parking positions are available on the apron which are reached from several bus-boarding gates. AIRAC A10/23 (valid from 30 November 2023) has determined the new QFU of the runway as 17/35 (was earlier 18/36) due to magnetic variation, and downgraded the "old" 17/35 to a taxiway only.

== Airlines and destinations ==
The following airlines operate scheduled services to and from Linate Airport:

Airlines	Destinations
Aer Lingus	Dublin
Aeroitalia	Cagliari, Comiso, Foggia, Olbia, Trieste
Air Dolomiti	Frankfurt, Munich
Air France	Paris–Charles de Gaulle
Austrian Airlines	Vienna
British Airways	London–Heathrow; Seasonal: London–City
Brussels Airlines	Brussels
DAT	Ancona
easyJet	Amsterdam, Barcelona, Berlin, Brussels, Copenhagen, Edinburgh, Frankfurt, Lisbon, London–Gatwick, Manchester, Paris–Charles de Gaulle, Paris–Orly, Porto, Tenerife–South Vienna; Seasonal: Brindisi, Figari, Geneva, Gran Canaria, Ibiza, Luxembourg, Palma de Mallorca, Split
Eurowings	Düsseldorf, Stuttgart
Finnair	Seasonal: Helsinki
Iberia	Madrid
ITA Airways	Alghero, Amsterdam, Bari, Brindisi, Brussels, Catania, Lamezia Terme, London–City, Munich, Naples, Palermo, Paris–Charles de Gaulle, Paris–Orly, Reggio Calabria, Rome–Fiumicino; Seasonal: Hamburg, Ibiza, Lampedusa, Palma de Mallorca, Rhodes, Rostock
KLM	Amsterdam
KM Malta Airlines	Malta
Lufthansa	Frankfurt, Munich
Luxair	Luxembourg
Scandinavian Airlines	Copenhagen, Stockholm–Arlanda
Small Fly Airlines	Seasonal: Elba
Volotea	Seasonal: Lampedusa, Pantelleria

== Statistics ==
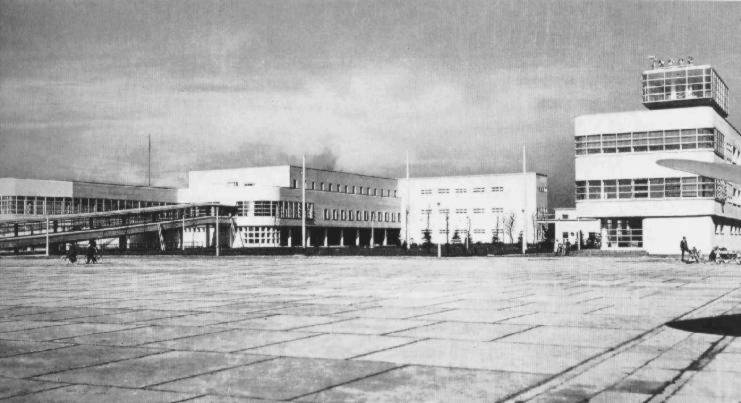
Linate airport in the 1930s

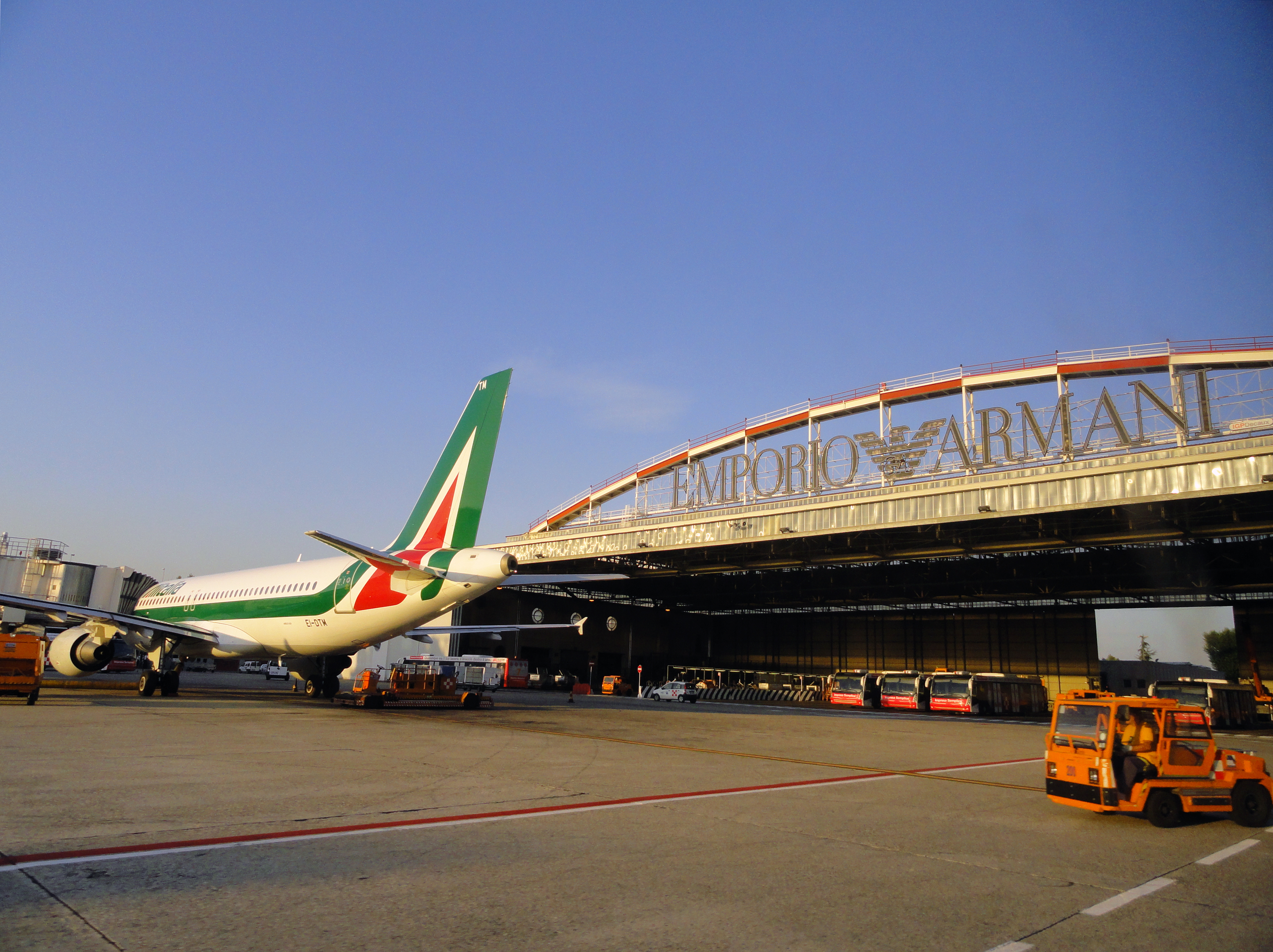
Maintenance hangar

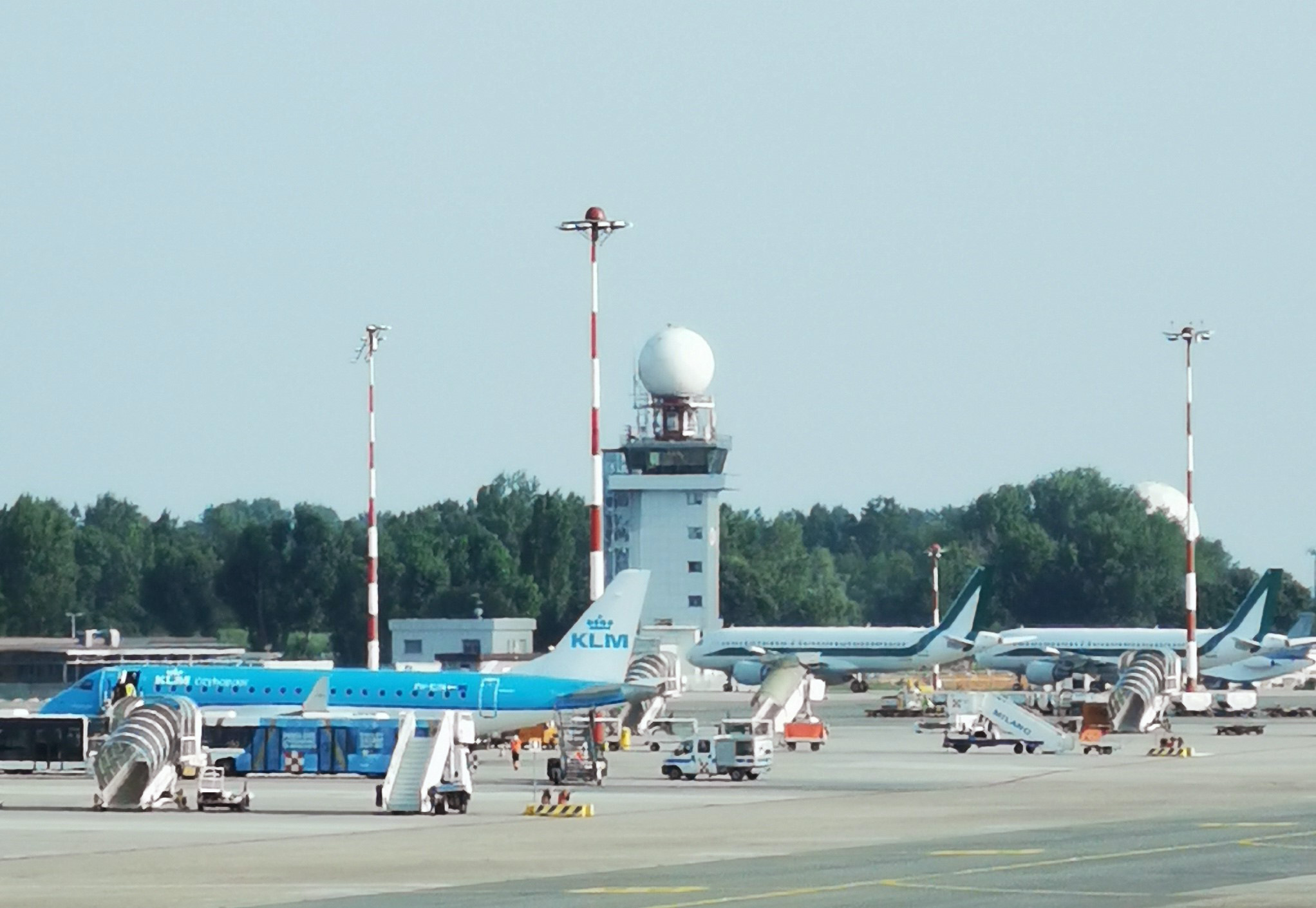
Control tower

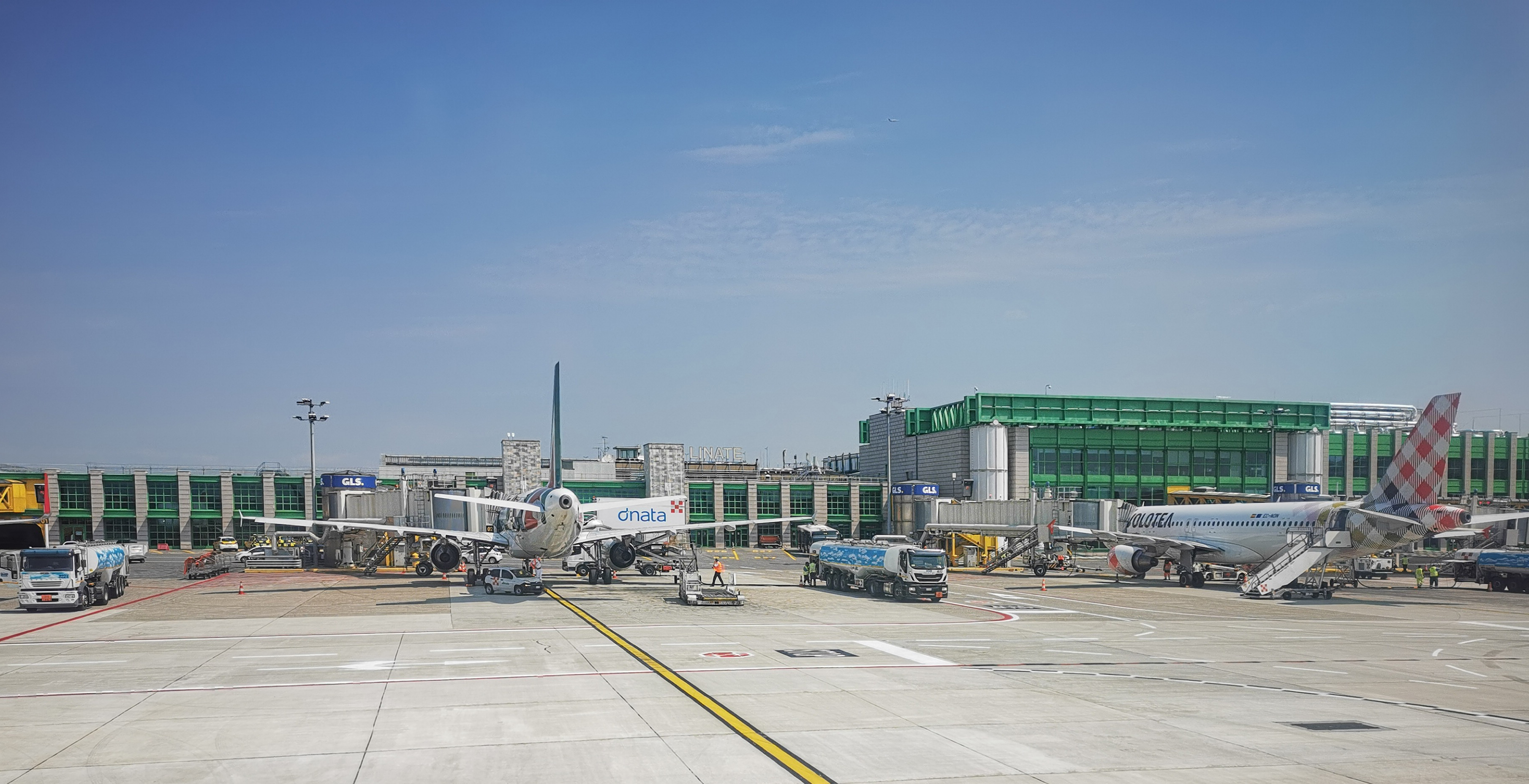
Apron view

Busiest domestic routes from Linate (2017)
Rank	City	Passengers	Airline
1	Rome–Fiumicino, Lazio	1,183,753	ITA Airways
2	Cagliari, Sardinia	627,299	ITA Airways, Volotea
3	Catania, Sicily	585,809	ITA Airways
4	Naples, Campania	509,251	ITA Airways
5	Bari, Apulia	403,247	ITA Airways
6	Palermo, Sicily	389,306	ITA Airways
7	Olbia, Sardinia	330,921	AeroItalia, Volotea
8	Brindisi, Apulia	218,672	ITA Airways
9	Alghero, Sardinia	202,884	ITA Airways
10	Lamezia Terme, Calabria	175,801	ITA Airways
11	Reggio Calabria, Calabria	163,168	ITA Airways

Busiest European routes from Linate (2016)
Rank	Rank var. 15-16	City	Passengers	Airline
1	Steady	Paris–Charles de Gaulle, France	▲785.308	Air France, Alitalia
2	▲1	Amsterdam, Netherlands	▲651.774	Alitalia, KLM
3	▼1	London–Heathrow, United Kingdom	▼616.402	Alitalia, British Airways
4	Steady	Frankfurt am Main, Germany	▲450.873	Alitalia, Lufthansa
5	▲6	London–Gatwick, United Kingdom	▲293.540	easyJet
6	▼1	Paris–Orly, France	▼237.696	Alitalia, easyJet
7	▼1	Brussels, Belgium	▼223.904	Alitalia, Brussels Airlines
8	Steady	Madrid, Spain	▲220.495	Iberia
9	▼2	Berlin–Tegel, Germany	▼204.124	Alitalia, Air Berlin
10	▼1	Düsseldorf, Germany	▲182.231	Alitalia, Air Berlin
11	▼1	London–City, United Kingdom	▲180.872	Alitalia, British Airways
12	Steady	Vienna, Austria	▲119.960	Austrian Airlines
13	Steady	Bucharest, Romania	▼103.718	Alitalia, Blue Air
14	Steady	Dublin, Ireland	▲99.335	Aer Lingus
15	Steady	Stockholm–Arlanda, Sweden	▲87.981	Scandinavian Airlines
16	Steady	Malta, Malta	▲78.030	Air Malta
17	Steady	Barcelona, Spain	▲66.538	Alitalia
18	Steady	Munich, Germany	62.969	Meridiana

== Ground transport ==
=== Metro ===
The Milan Metro Line 4 connects the airport to the city centre with a travel time of about 15 minutes.

=== Bus and coach ===
The airport can be reached by several coach and bus services from Milan and other destinations.

From Milan Central Station, Linate is served by several shuttle/coach services, including Linate Shuttle (Milano Centrale–Dateo–Linate), Airport Bus Express (Milano Centrale–Lambrate–Linate) and Flibco (Linate–Milano Centrale/Piazza Luigi di Savoia); journey times are around 25 minutes from Centrale (and around 10 minutes from Lambrate for Airport Bus Express).

Local and suburban connections include ATM line 973 (San Felice–Linate–Milan 5 Giornate), ATM line 901 (Linate–Peschiera Borromeo–San Donato M3, weekdays), ATM line 903 (weekend replacement for 901), ATM line 923 (Linate–Novegro–San Felice–Ospedale San Raffaele), and the suburban lines Z409 (Linate–San Felice–Rodano) and K511 (Vailate–Rivolta–Liscate–Pioltello–Milan 5 Giornate).

=== Car ===
The airport is located on Viale Enrico Forlanini next to its intersection with Autostrada A51 (exit 6 Aeroporto Linate). A51 is part of the city's highway ring, so the airport can be reached from any direction.

== Incidents and accidents ==
- On 6 December 1948, an Avio Linee Italiane (ALI) Douglas DC-3 crashed on takeoff in fog. All seven occupants died.
- On 8 October 2001, during severe fog Scandinavian Airlines System Flight 686, bound for Copenhagen Airport, collided with a business jet which had inadvertently taxied onto the runway in use. This collision later resulted in criminal and legal proceedings against 11 staff, including an air traffic controller, flight safety officials and management officials from the airport. All 114 people on both aircraft were killed, as well as four people on the ground. The Linate Airport disaster remains the deadliest air disaster in Italian history.
- On 1 June 2003, a Learjet 45 operated by Eurojet Italia crashed shortly after takeoff because of birdstrikes affecting both engines and loss of control attempting an emergency landing back at Linate. Both pilots were killed.
- On 15 June 2005, a light aircraft safely landed on taxiway 'T' after its pilot had mistaken it for runway 36R. Following that incident, a safety recommendation was issued. It suggested the use of different numbers to help differentiate between runways. This change was enacted at the beginning of July 2007, when 18R/36L became 17/35 and 18L/36R became 18/36.
- On 3 October 2021, a privately owned Pilatus PC-12 that had just taken off from Linate Airport crashed into an empty building, killing all eight passengers and crew on board. The plane was heading for Olbia on the island of Sardinia, but it came down soon after takeoff on the outskirts of the city near the metro station at San Donato Milanese, near Milan. The victims included businessman Dan Petrescu, one of the wealthiest people in Romania at the time; his wife, his son, and five others, including a one-year-old baby. Several empty parked cars caught fire after the crash near the metro station, emergency workers said. Firefighters worked to extinguish the flames rising from the building, which was reportedly under reforms.
