= Milan Bergamo Airport =

Airport in Bergamo, Lombardy, Italy

Il Caravaggio International Airport Aeroporto Internazionale Il Caravaggio

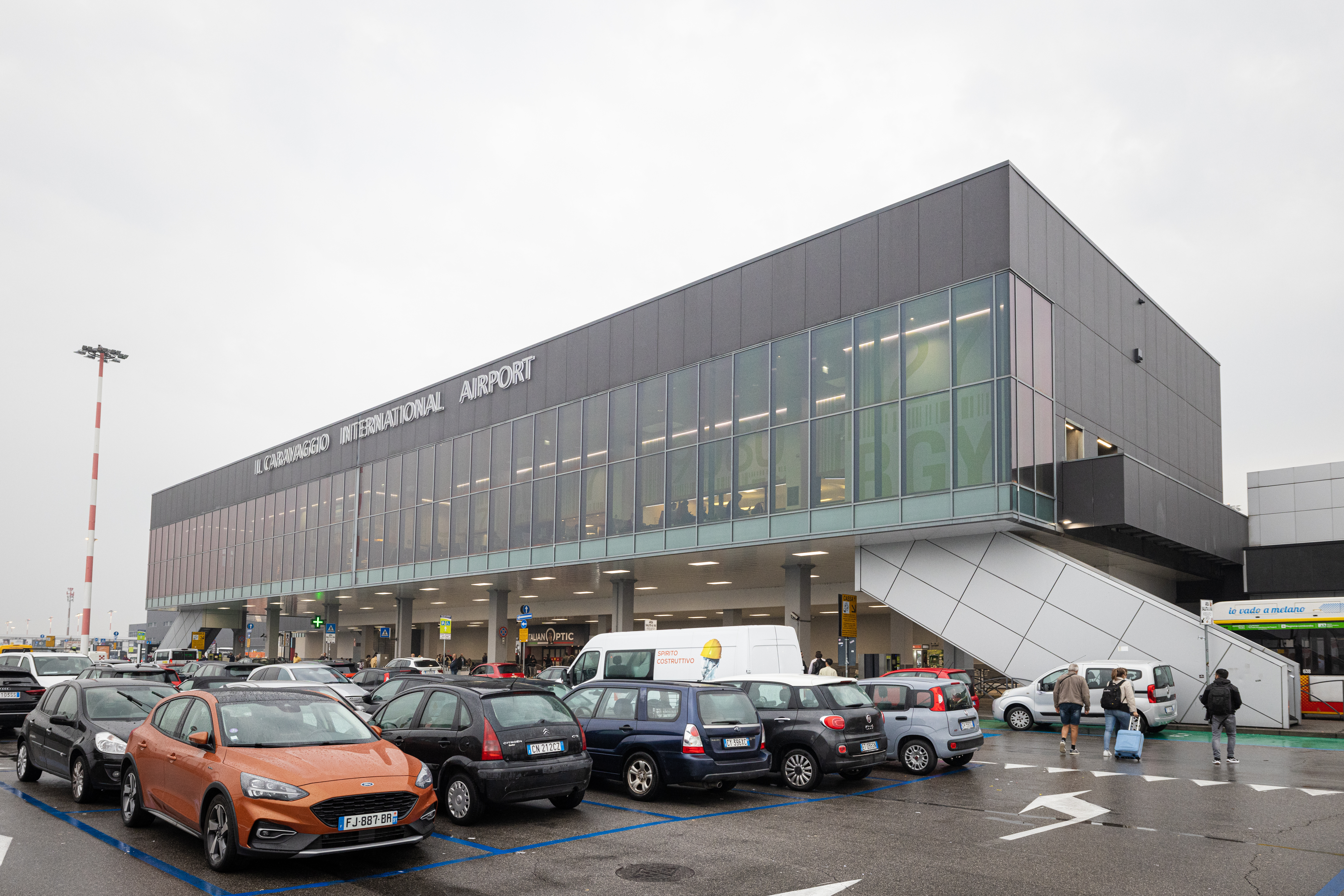
- IATA: BGY; ICAO: LIME

Summary
- Airport type: Public
- Operator: SACBO
- Serves: Milan metropolitan area
- Location: Orio al Serio, Lombardy, Italy
- Operating base for: AeroItalia; AlbaStar; Ryanair
- Elevation AMSL: 782 ft (238 m)
- Coordinates: 45°40′08″N 009°42′01″E
- Website: www.milanbergamoairport.it

Map
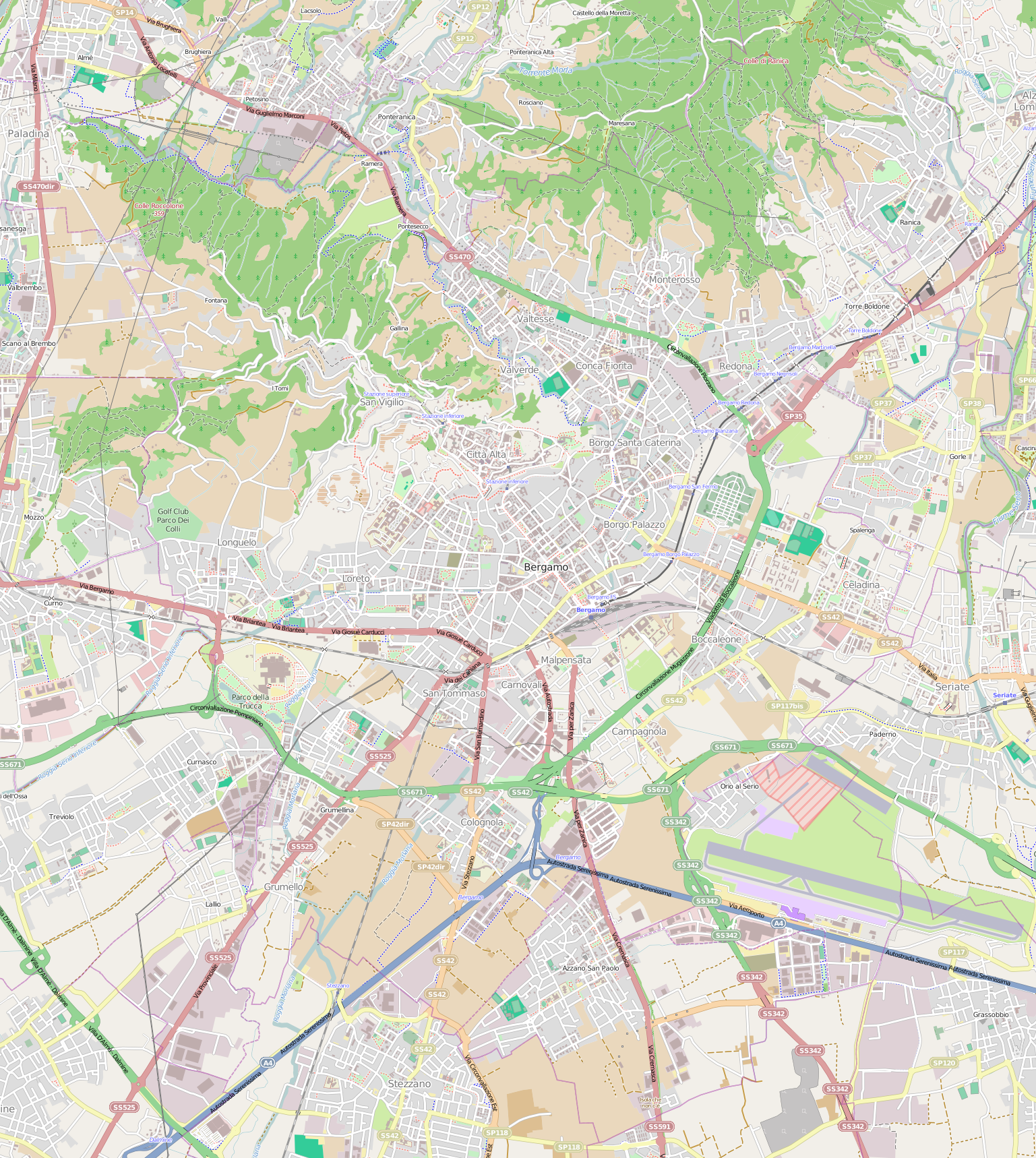
- Location of airport on map of Bergamo BGY (Lombardy) BGY (Italy)

Runways
Direction	Length		Surface
Direction	m	ft	Surface
10/28	2,937	9,630	Asphalt
12/30	778	2,552	Asphalt

Statistics (2024)
- Passengers: 17,353,573
- Passenger change 23-24: ▲8.6%
- Movements: 109,971
- Movements change 23-24: ▲8.1%
- Cargo (tons): 22,964.4
- Cargo change 23-24: ▲8.8%
- Source: List of the busiest airports in Europe, Italian AIP, Assaeroporti

Milan Bergamo Airport (IATA: BGY, ICAO: LIME), also formerly known as Orio al Serio International Airport, is the third-busiest international airport in Italy. The airport is also officially called Il Caravaggio International Airport after the Baroque painter Michelangelo Merisi da Caravaggio, who originally hailed from the nearby town of Caravaggio.

The airport served almost 17.4 million passengers in 2024 and is one of Ryanair's four largest operating bases, along with Dublin Airport, London Stansted Airport, and Brussels South Charleroi Airport.

The airport is located in Orio al Serio, 3.7 km (2.3 mi) southeast of Bergamo and 45 km (28 mi) northeast of Milan. Together with Milan Malpensa Airport and Milan Linate Airport, it forms the Milan airport system serving the Milan metropolitan area, that with 56.9 million passengers in 2024 constitutes the largest airport system in Italy by number of passengers.

In 2024, Milan Bergamo Airport launched a digital twin initiative to simulate airport operations in real time and support infrastructure planning and emergency management.

== Overview ==
The airport is managed by SACBO, a company partially owned by SEA – Aeroporti di Milano, the operator of Linate and Malpensa airports. SEA, the company that runs the latter two airports, also holds a 31% stake in SACBO.

The terminal is split into two zones, A (Gates A1-A15) and B (Gates B1-B5). Gates A13/A14 and A15/A16 are equipped with boarding bridges; the remaining gates are remote gates.

In March 2021, DHL Aviation announced plans to relocate their hub from Bergamo to Milan Malpensa Airport where DHL opened new logistics facilities. In early 2022, DHL confirmed the end of all operations at Bergamo.

== Airlines and destinations ==
=== Passenger ===
The following airlines operate scheduled and charter services in Bergamo:

Airlines	Destinations
Aeroitalia	Foggia, Tripoli-Mitiga; Seasonal: Catania
Air Arabia	Cairo, Casablanca, Fès Sharjah; Seasonal: Alexandria
Air Cairo	Sharm El Sheikh
Air Nostrum	Seasonal charter: Palma de Mallorca
AJet	Istanbul–Sabiha Gökçen
Bluebird Airways	Seasonal: Tel Aviv
Cabo Verde Airlines	Sal
Corendon Airlines	Seasonal charter: İzmir
Dan Air	Bacău
Eurowings	Düsseldorf
flyadeal	Seasonal: Jeddah, Riyadh
flydubai	Dubai–International
FlyOne	Yerevan
Georgian Airways	Tbilisi
HiSky	Chișinău
Israir	Tel Aviv
Neos	Dakar–Diass; Seasonal: Boa Vista, Cagliari, Catania, Heraklion, Ibiza, Karpathos, Kos, Marsa Alam, Menorca, Sal, Sharm El Sheikh
Nile Air	Cairo
Norwegian Air Shuttle	Copenhagen, Helsinki, Oslo; Seasonal: Bergen, Billund, Harstad/Narvik, Stavanger, Tromsø
Pegasus Airlines	Istanbul–Sabiha Gökçen
Ryanair	Agadir, Alghero, Alicante, Amman–Queen Alia, Athens, Barcelona, Bari, Beauvais, Beni Mellal, Berlin, Birmingham, Brindisi, Bristol, Bucharest–Otopeni, Budapest, Cagliari, Catania, Charleroi, Cluj-Napoca, Cologne/Bonn, Copenhagen, Crotone, Dublin, East Midlands, Edinburgh, Eindhoven, Faro, Fès, Fuerteventura, Gdańsk, Gran Canaria, Helsinki, Iași, Kaunas, Kraków, Lamezia Terme, Lanzarote, Lisbon, Liverpool, London–Stansted, Lourdes, Lublin, Luxembourg, Madrid, Málaga, Malta, Manchester, Marrakesh, Marseille, Naples, Newcastle upon Tyne, Olbia, Palermo, Palma de Mallorca, Paphos, Porto, Poznan, Prague, Rabat, Reggio Calabria, Riga, Rovaniemi, Salerno, Sandefjord, Seville, Sofia, Stockholm–Arlanda, Tangier, Tenerife–South, Thessaloniki, Tirana, Toulouse, Trapani, Valencia, Vienna, Vilnius, Vitoria, Warsaw–Modlin, Wrocław, Zagreb, Zaragoza; Seasonal: Aarhus (begins 28 March 2027), Belfast–International, Biarritz, Brno, Castellón, Chania, Corfu, Dubrovnik, Heraklion, Ibiza, Kalamata, Kefalonia, Knock, Lemnos, Łódź, Menorca, Preveza, Rhodes, Santorini, Sarajevo, Skiathos, Weeze, Zadar, Zakynthos
TUS Airways	Tel Aviv
Volotea	Asturias, Nantes; Seasonal: Olbia
Wizz Air	Belgrade, Bucharest–Băneasa, Bucharest–Otopeni, Chișinău, Cluj-Napoca, Craiova, Iași, Oradea, Skopje, Sofia, Suceava, Târgu Mureș, Timișoara, Tirana, Varna, Warsaw–Chopin, Warsaw–Modlin

=== Cargo ===
Airlines	Destinations
UPS Airlines	Cologne/Bonn

== Statistics ==
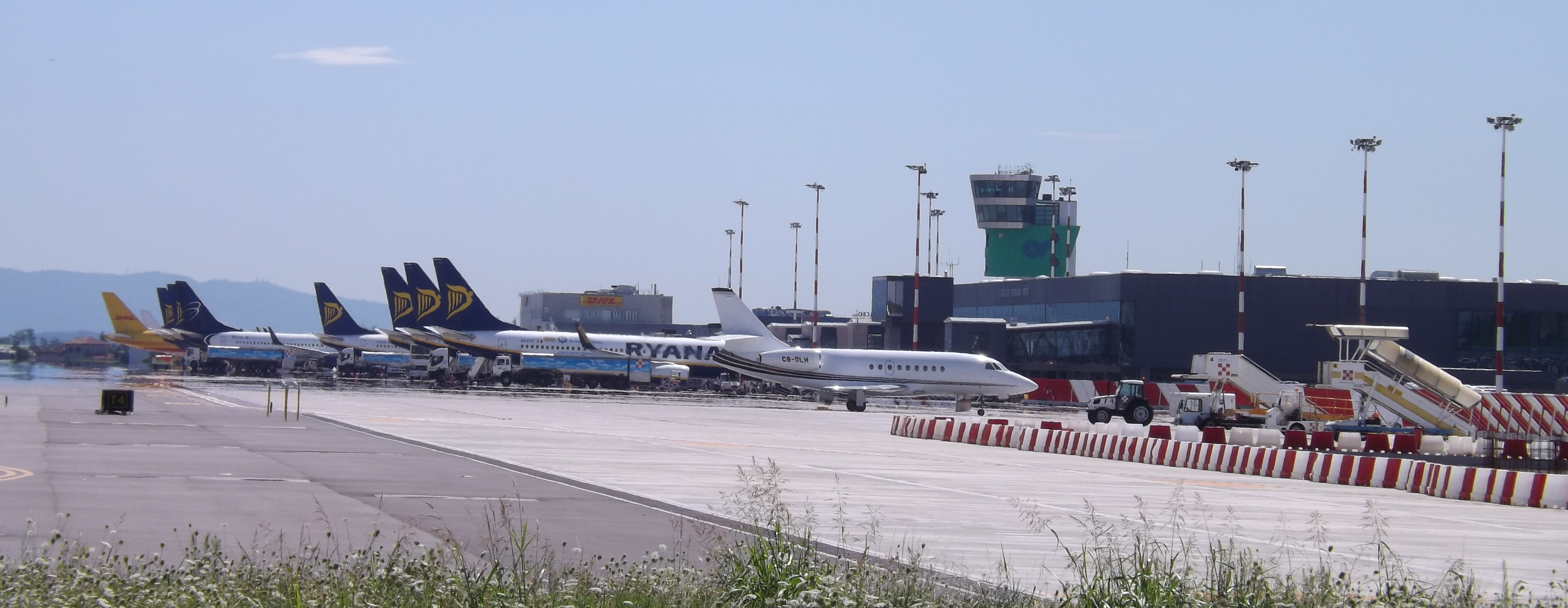
Apron view

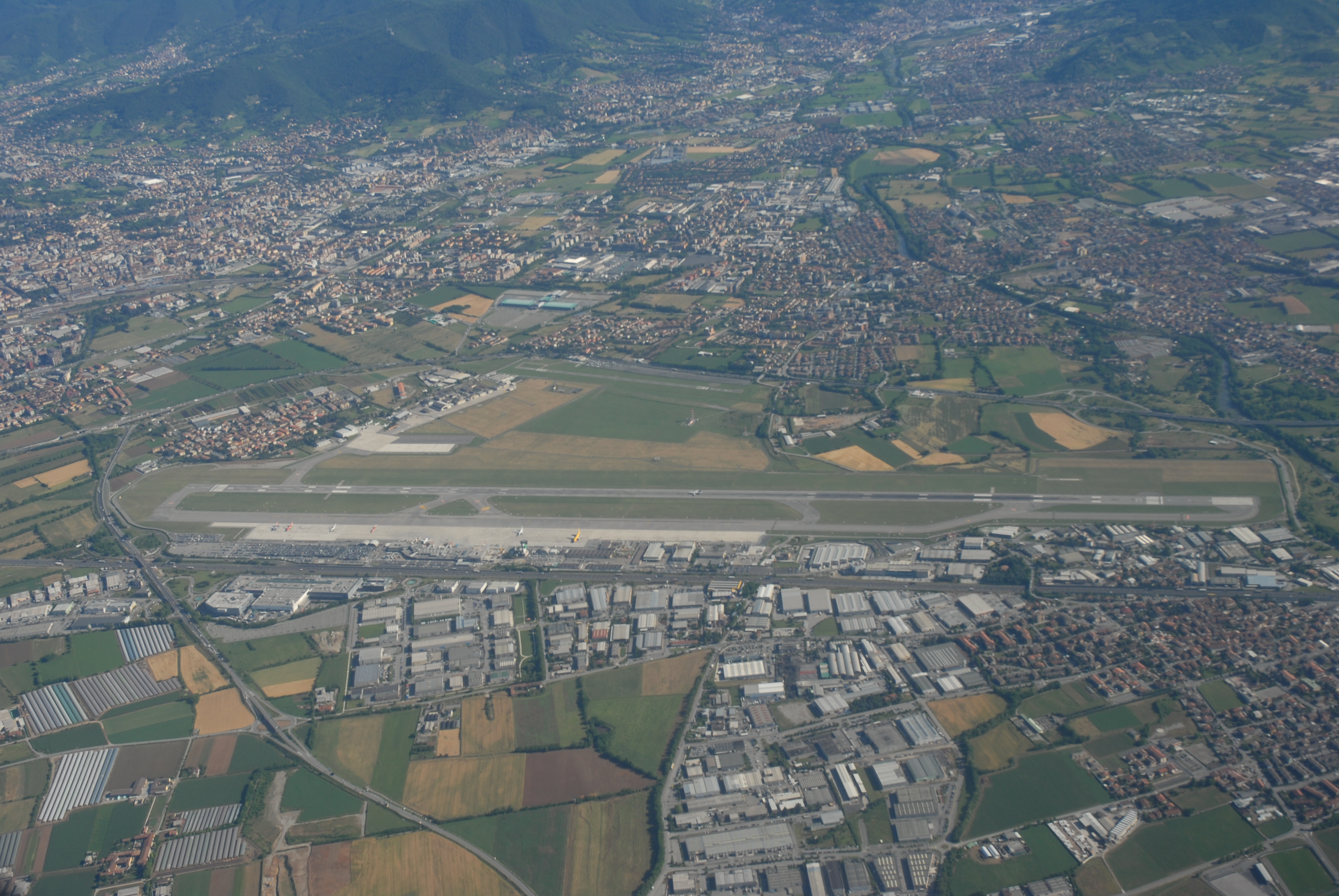
Aerial view

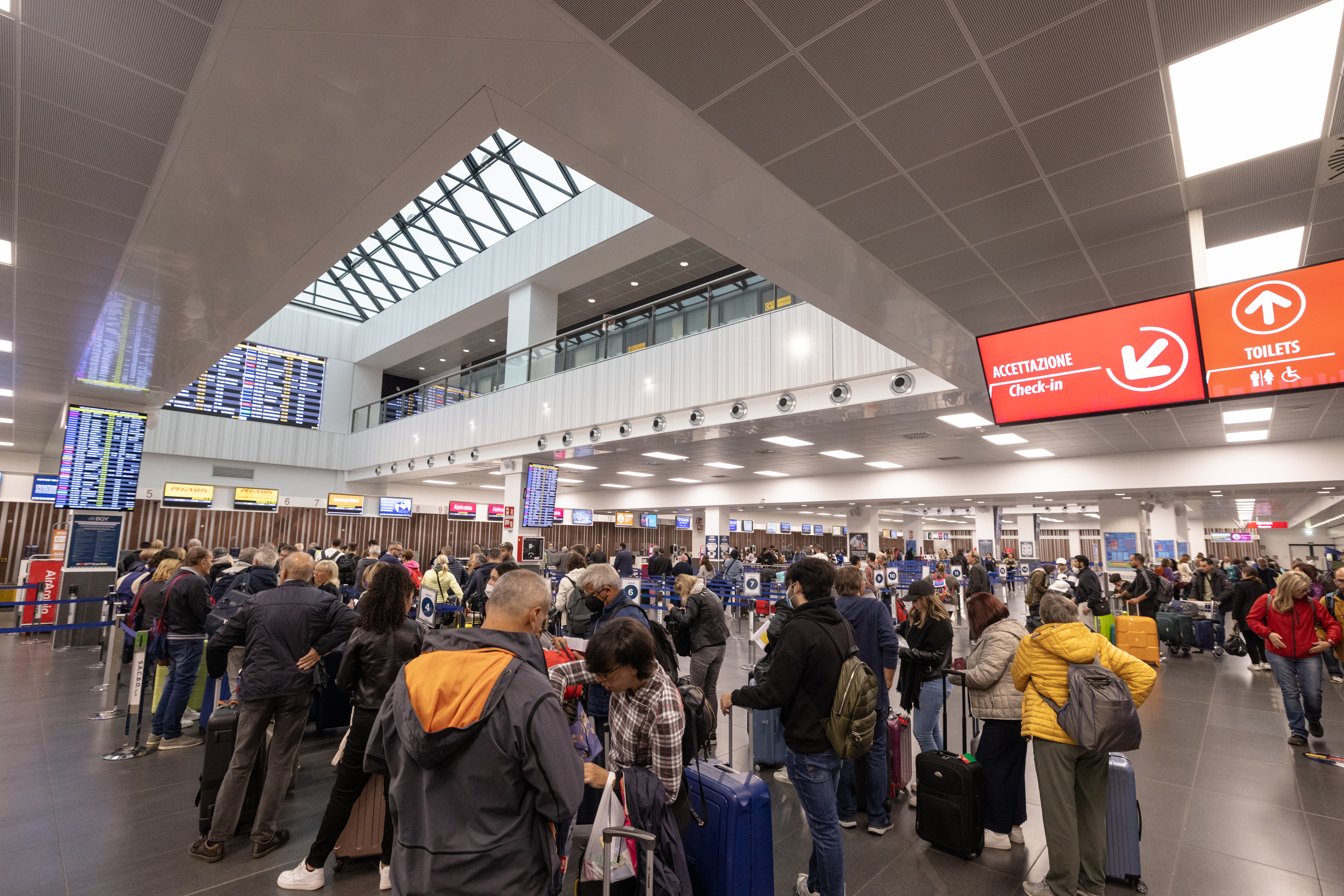
Departures area

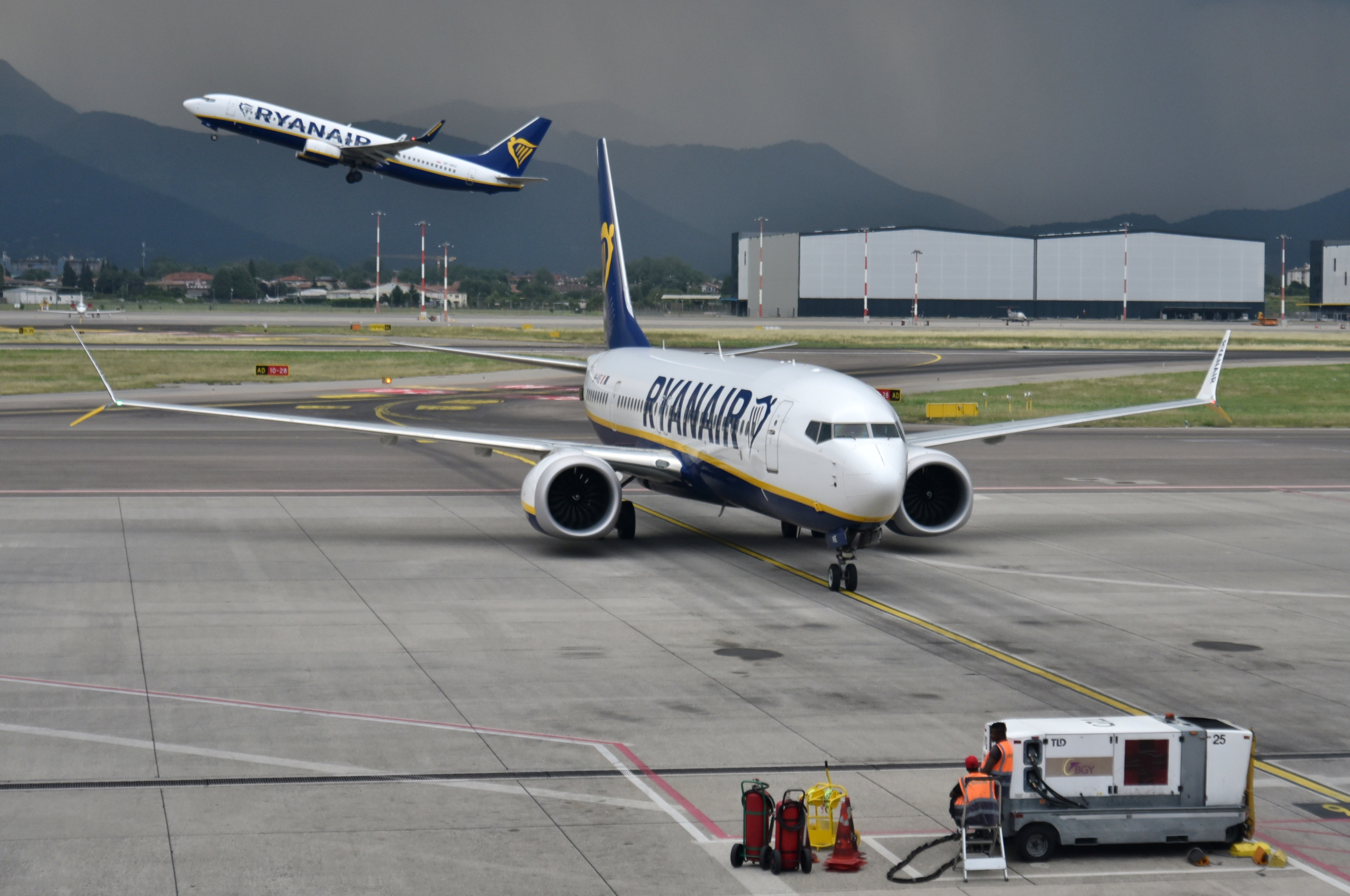
Ryanair Boeing 737s at the airport

=== Traffic ===
Orio al Serio Airport – traffic information
Year	Passengers	Movements	Cargo tons
2005	4,356,143	51,635	136,339
2006	5,244,794 (+20.4%)	56,358 (+9.1%)	140,630 (+3.1%)
2007	5,741,734 (+9.5%)	61,364 (+8.9%)	134,449 (−4.4%)
2008	6,482,590 (+12.9%)	64,390 (+4.9%)	122,398 (−9.0%)
2009	7,160,008 (+10.4%)	65,314 (+1.4%)	100,354 (−18.0%)
2010	7,661,061 (+7.2%)	67,167 (+6.3%)	106,050 (+6.5%)
2011	8,419,948 (+9.7%)	71,514 (+5.7%)	112,556 (+5.3%)
2012	8,801,392 (+5.5%)	72,420 (+4.3%)	116,730 (+4.0%)
2013	8,882,611 (+0.9%)	69,974 (−3.4%)	115,950 (−0.7%)
2014	8,696,085 (−2.1%)	66,390 (−5.1%)	122,488 (+5.6%)
2015	10,404,625 (+18.6%)	76,078 (+12.4%)	121,045 (−1.8%)
2016	11,159,631 (+7.3%)	79,953 (+5.1%)	117,765 (−2.7%)
2017	12,336,137 (+10.5%)	86,113 (+7.7%)	125,948 (+6.9%)
2018	12,938,572 (+4.9%)	89,533 (+4.0%)	123,032 (−2.3%)
2019	13,857,257 (+7.1%)	95,377 (+6.5%)	118,964 (−3.3%)
2020	3,833,063 (−72.3%)	38,668 (−59.5%)	51,543 (−56.7%)
2021	6,467,296 (+68.7%)	51,879 (+34.2%)	26,044 (−49.5%)
2022	13,155 806 (+130,4%)	88,846 (+71,3%)	20,827 (-20%)
2023	15,974,451 (+21.4%)	101,765 (+14.5%)	21,105 (+1.3%)
2024	17,353,573 (+8,6%)	109 971 (+8,1%)	22, 964 (+8,8%)

=== Busiest domestic routes ===
Busiest domestic routes from/to Bergamo (2023)
Rank	Rank (v. 2022)	Airport	Passengers	Airline(s)
1	Steady	Naples, Campania	▼445,368	Ryanair
2	▲2	Brindisi, Apulia	▲417,513	Ryanair
3	▲2	Palermo, Sicily	▲415,216	Ryanair
4	▼2	Bari, Apulia	▲409,862	Ryanair
5	▼2	Catania, Sicily	▲388,104	AeroItalia, Neos, Ryanair
6	Steady	Cagliari, Sardinia	▲386,340	Ryanair
7	Steady	Lamezia Terme, Calabria	▲340,902	Ryanair

=== Busiest European routes ===
Busiest European routes from/to Bergamo (2023)
Rank	Rank (v. 2022)	Airport	Passengers	Airline(s)
1	Steady	Bucharest, Romania	▲444,959	Ryanair, Wizz Air
2	Steady	Barcelona, Spain	▲388,883	Ryanair
3	Steady	Lisbon, Portugal	▲311,802	Ryanair
4	Steady	Brussels, Belgium	▲285,364	Ryanair
5	▲2	Sofia, Bulgaria	▲272,448	Ryanair, Wizz Air
6	▼1	Dublin, Ireland	▲265,699	Ryanair
7	▼1	Madrid, Spain	▲256,715	Ryanair
8	Steady	Budapest, Hungary	▲235,209	Ryanair, Wizz Air
9	▲3	Valencia, Spain	▲231,708	Ryanair
10	▲18	Cluj Napoca, Romania	▲230,690	Ryanair, Wizz Air
11	▲13	Vienna, Austria	▲228,500	Ryanair
12	▼3	Copenhagen, Denmark	▲219,029	Norwegian Air Shuttle, Ryanair
13	▼2	Prague, Czech Republic	▲216,251	Ryanair
14	Steady	Paris–Beauvais, France	▲200,586	Ryanair
15	▲16	Iasi, Romania	▲197,391	Ryanair, Wizz Air
16	▼3	Cologne, Germany	▲196,990	Ryanair
17	▲2	Krakow, Poland	▲193,142	Ryanair

=== Busiest non-EU routes ===
Busiest non-EU routes from/to Bergamo (2023)
Rank	Rank (v. 2022)	Airport	Passengers	Airline(s)
1	Steady	London-Stansted, United Kingdom	▲514,951	Ryanair
2	Steady	Tirana, Albania	▲363,105	Ryanair, Wizz Air
3	Steady	Istanbul, Turkey	▲344,066	AJet, Pegasus Airlines
4	Steady	Manchester, United Kingdom	▲165,621	Ryanair

== Accidents and incidents ==
- On 30 October 2005, Trade Air Flight 729 crashed near Bergamo, Italy, shortly after taking off in poor weather. The flight was a night-time cargo flight from Bergamo to Zagreb operated by a Let L-410 Turbolet with the registration 9A-BTA. All three people on board, two pilots and a passenger, were killed.
- On 5 August 2016, during the night, Boeing 737-476 (SF) registered HA-FAX, operated by ASL Airlines Hungary, overshot while landing on runway 28 in Bergamo and came to a stop on a parking lot and on a secondary highway lane that is around the airport, 300 m (980 ft) from the runway end. No one was injured, but some cars were destroyed and the plane sustained substantial damages. The plane was removed from the street the same day. The air traffic remained unvaried without delays.
- On 8 July 2025, a man died after trespassing into the runway and getting sucked into the engine of a departing Volotea aircraft headed to Asturias, Spain in a suspected suicide. The man was identified as a 35-year old from Calcinate, who had a history of substance abuse and had attended rehabilitation programs. The Bergamo Prosecutor's office is investigating the case of "incitement to suicide" and the security measures at the airport.

== Ground transportation ==
=== Car ===
The A4 is one of the main road networks that link the airport.

=== Bus ===
There are several public transportation links to and from downtown Milan, including express coaches. The main coach operators at Milan Bergamo Airport include ATB, Orioshuttle, Terravision, Flibco and Autostradale, offering frequent services to central Milan as well as other major cities and regional destinations. There are further connections to/from Bergamo city center, Arezzo, Bologna, Brescia, Monza, Turin, Malpensa Airport, Milan Trade Exhibition Center, Parma, Turin, and Verona.

=== Railway ===
While a railway station is currently being built at Bergamo airport, scheduled to open in 2026, the current nearest railway station is Bergamo railway station, 3.5 miles (5.6 km) away. There is no official shuttle between the airport and the railway station. A bus service operated by ATB connects to the airport, about 10 minutes from the train station.

== See also ==
- Transport in Milan
- List of airports in Italy
