= Milan metropolitan area =

Human settlement in Italy

Milan metropolitan area Area metropolitana di Milano
- Metropolitan area
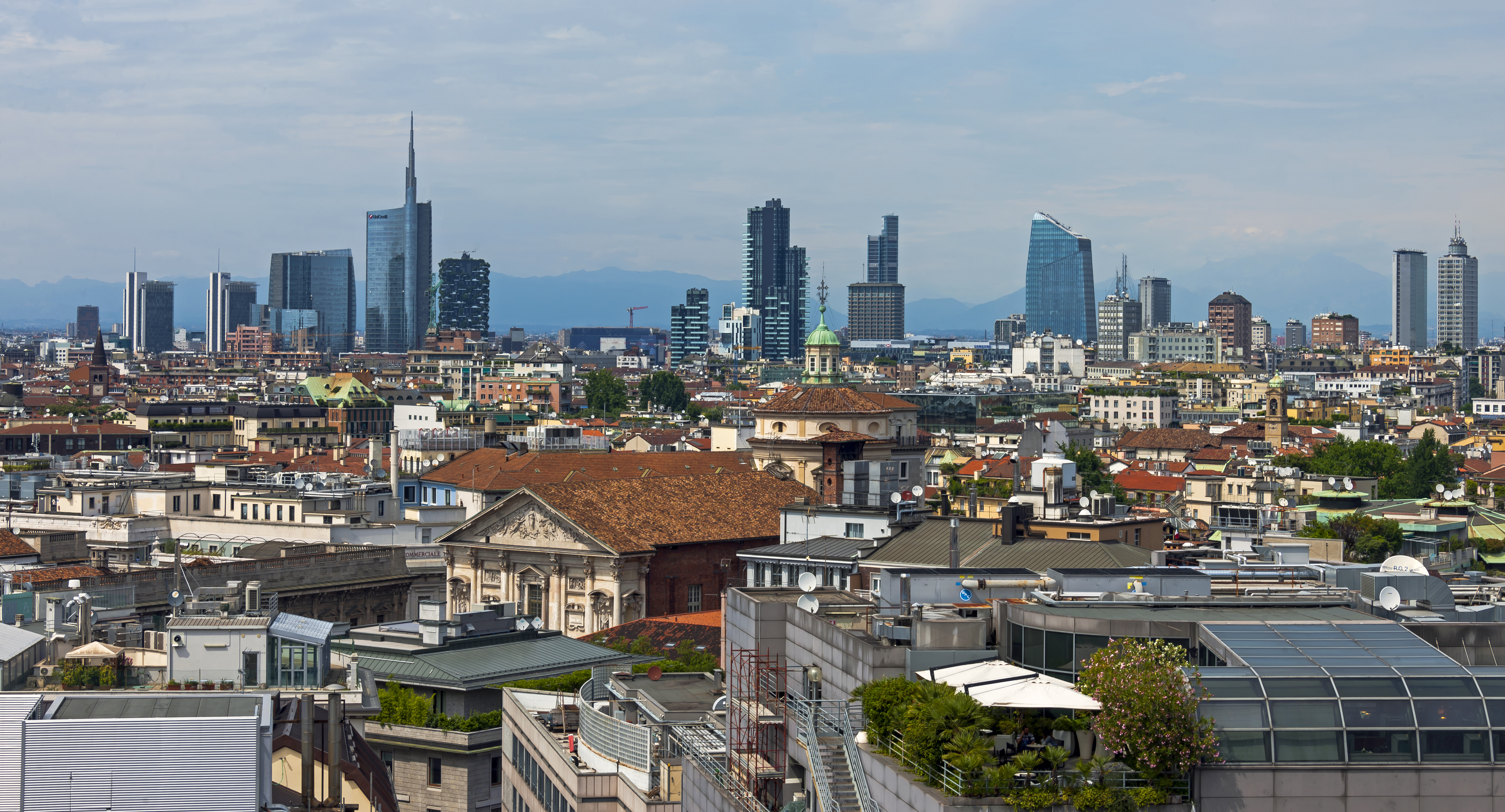
- Milan
- Interactive map of Milan metropolitan area
- Country: Italy
- Largest city: Milan (1,371,498)

Area
  - Metro: 3,632 km^{2} (1,402 sq mi)

Population
  - Metro: 6,100,000
  - Metro density: 1,679/km^{2} (4,350/sq mi)
- Time zone: UTC+1 (CET)

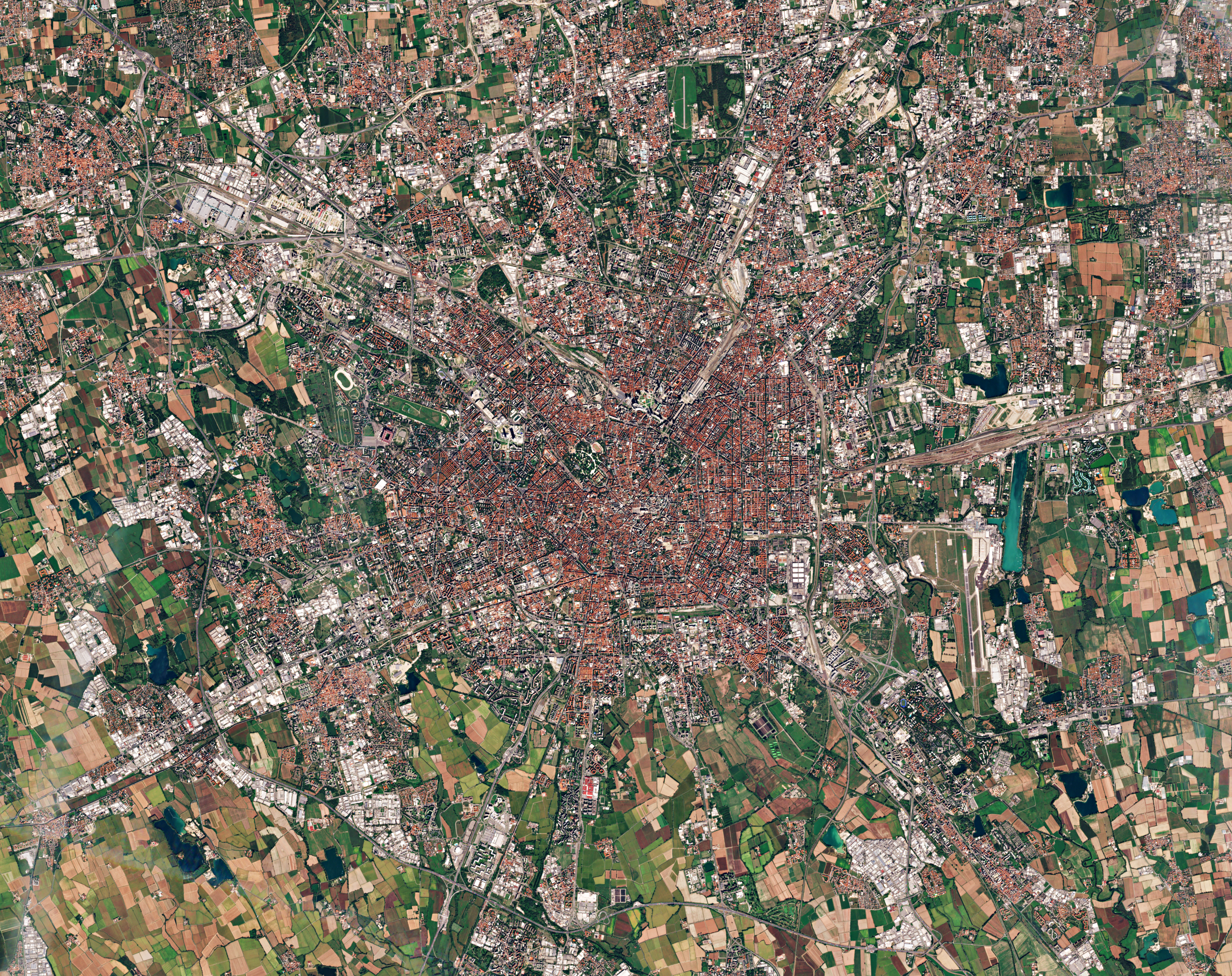
The Milan metropolitan area as seen from the International Space Station

The Milan metropolitan area, also known as Grande Milano ("Greater Milan"), is the largest metropolitan area in Italy and the 54th largest in the world.

== Definition ==
Given the absence of an official statistical definition for the metropolitan area of Milan, tracing precise boundaries is a somewhat slippery issue. However, during the last decade, a number of studies have been carried out on the subject by some authoritative institutions and scholars, notably the Organisation for Economic Co-operation and Development and numerous Italian sources that build a definition based on commuting fluxes and on the concentration of commercial, leisure and public utility services. A broad consensus exists upon a definition that includes the central Lombard provinces of Milan, Bergamo, Como, Lecco, Lodi, Monza and Brianza, Pavia, Varese and the Piedmontese Province of Novara, while some scholars include also the Province of Cremona and Brescia in Lombardy, the Piemontese Province of Alessandria and the Emilian Province of Piacenza. The overall population under the narrowest definition is about 9 million over an area of about 13,000 km^{2} (5,000 sq mi).

Provinces in the Milan metro area	Area (km^{2})	2001 Population	2011 Population	2019 Population	% change (2011 to 2019)	GDP (USD Mn, 2016)
Milan	1,575.65	2,938,556	3,038,420	3,259,835	+7.29%	202,971
Bergamo	2,745.94	973,559	1,086,277	1,114,365	+2.59%	41,945
Varese	1,198.11	812,934	871,886	890,768	+2.17%	30,812
Monza	405.41	766,767	840,129	873,935	+4.02%	31,972
Como	1,279.04	537,853	586,735	599,204	+2.13%	19,892
Pavia	2,968.64	493,829	535,822	545,888	+1.88%	15,696
Novara	1,340.28	343,097	365,559	368,597	+0.83%	12,938
Lecco	814.58	311,637	336,310	337,380	+0.32%	12,142
Lodi	782.99	198,020	223,755	230,198	+2.88%	7,229
Total	13,110.64	7,376,242	7,884,893	8,220,170	+4.25%	375,597

=== Largest cities ===
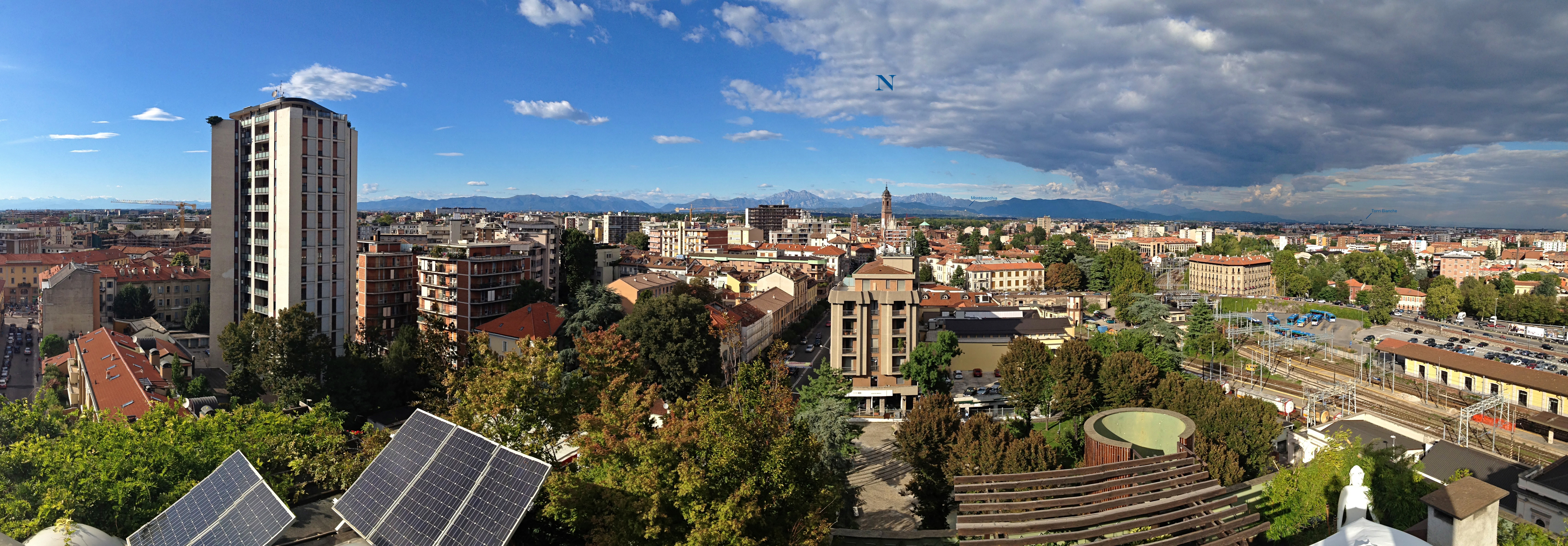
Monza

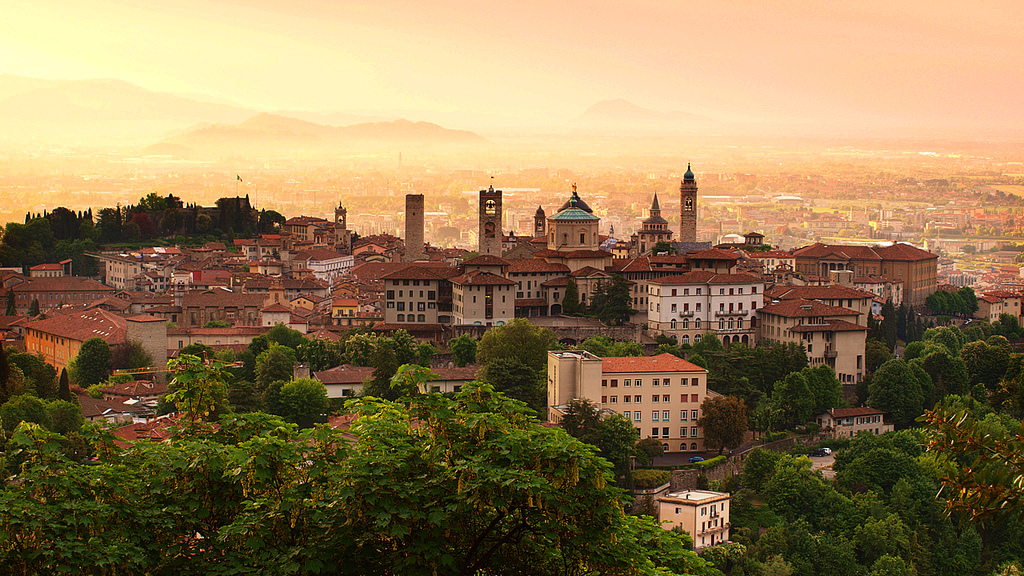
Bergamo

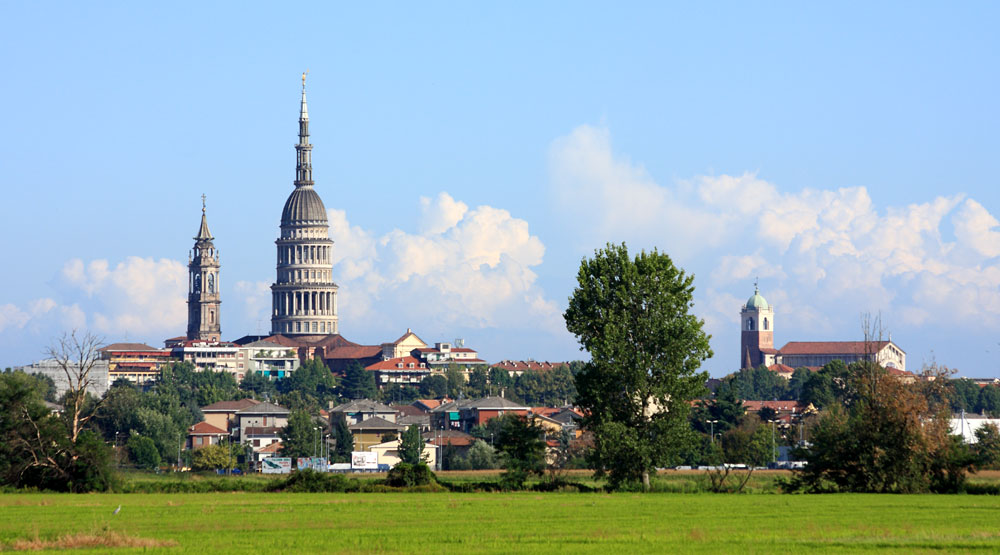
Novara

The following is a list of the twenty largest cities in the Milan metropolitan area as ranked by population.

Rank	City	Province	2001 population	2011 population	2017 population	% change (2011 to 2017)
1	Milan	Milan	1,256,211	1,242,123	1,351,562	+8.81%
2	Monza	Monza	120,104	119,856	122,955	+2.59%
3	Bergamo	Bergamo	112,864	115,349	120,287	+4.28%
4	Novara	Novara	100,939	101,952	104,165	+2.17%
5	Como	Como	78,546	82,045	84,326	+2.78%
6	Busto Arsizio	Varese	75,866	79,692	83,340	+4.58%
7	Sesto San Giovanni	Milan	78,831	76,514	81,822	+6.94%
8	Varese	Varese	80,492	79,793	80,694	+1.13%
9	Cinisello Balsamo	Milan	71,924	71,128	75,659	+6.37%
10	Pavia	Pavia	71,366	68,280	72,612	+6.34%
11	Vigevano	Pavia	57,444	60,109	63,505	+5.65%
12	Legnano	Milan	53,809	57,647	60,259	+4.53%
13	Gallarate	Varese	46,461	50,456	53,145	+5.33%
14	Rho	Milan	50,451	50,052	50,767	+1.43%
15	Lecco	Lecco	45,513	46,705	48,131	+3.05%
16	Cologno Monzese	Milan	48,270	45,786	47,751	+4.29%
17	Paderno Dugnano	Milan	45,439	46,562	46,590	+0.06%
18	Lodi	Lodi	40,894	43,332	45,212	+4.34%
19	Lissone	Monza	34,482	42,220	45,233	+7.14%
20	Seregno	Monza	39,171	43,001	44,962	+4.56%

== See also ==
- Transport in Milan
- List of metropolitan areas in Europe
- Metropolitan City of Milan
- Province of Milan
