= List of Ryanair destinations =

As of September 2026, Ryanair flies to a total of 232 destinations, including 5 domestic destinations within Ireland and 227 international destinations across Europe, Northern Africa and the Middle East. The list includes the city, country and the airport's name, with the airline's hubs marked.

The country with the most Destinations served is Italy with 32, followed by France with 25 destinations, followed by Spain 24 destinations.

== Map ==
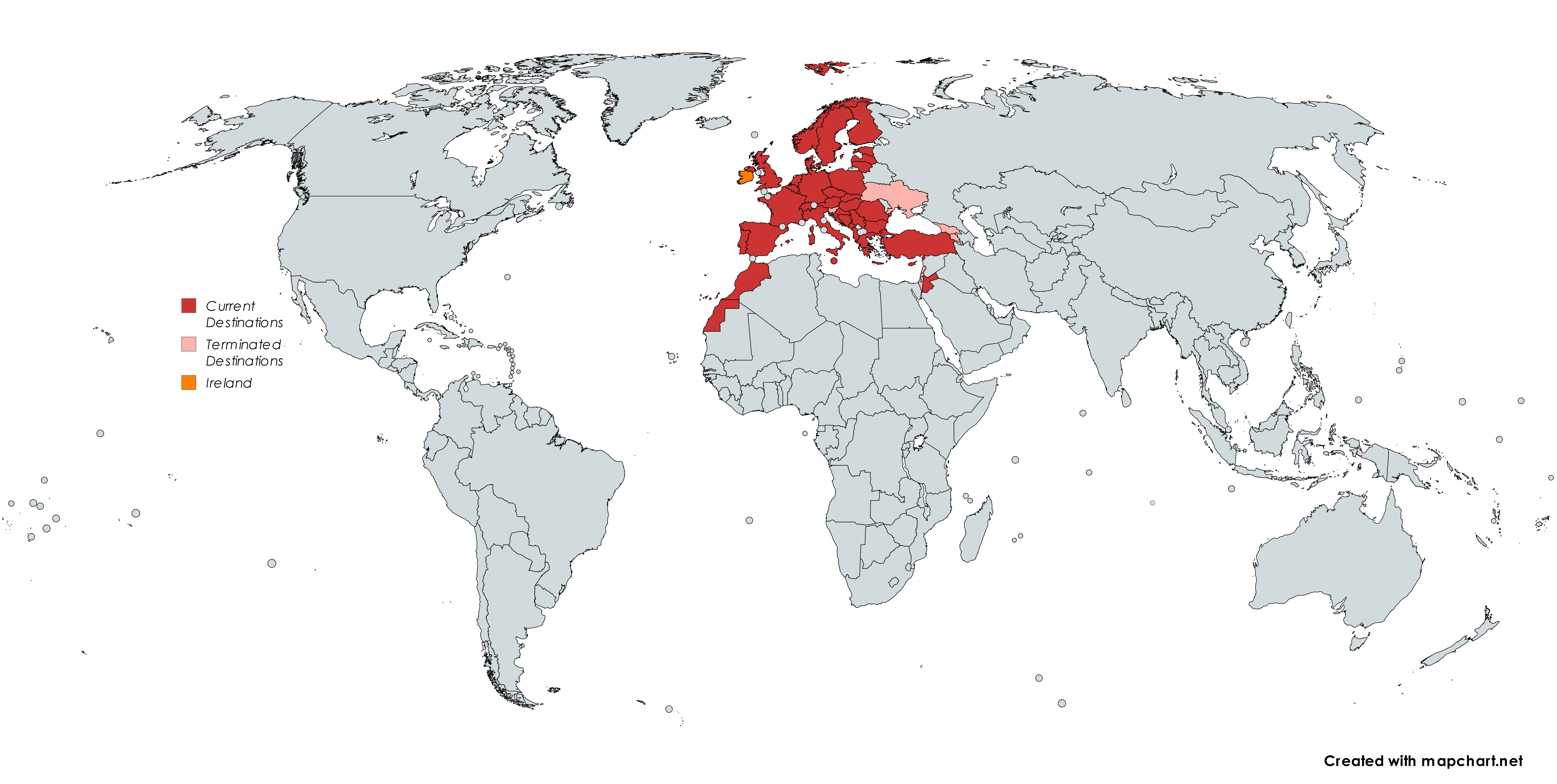
Ryanair passenger destinations

== List ==
Country	Town	Airport	Notes	Refs
Albania	Tirana	Tirana International Airport Nënë Tereza	Base	
Armenia	Gyumri	Gyumri Shirak International Airport	Terminated	
Armenia	Yerevan	Zvartnots International Airport	Terminated	
Austria	Graz	Graz Airport	Terminated	
Austria	Klagenfurt	Klagenfurt Airport		
Austria	Linz	Linz Airport		
Austria	Salzburg	Salzburg Airport		
Austria	Vienna	Vienna Airport	Base	
Belgium	Brussels	Brussels Airport		
Belgium	Charleroi	Brussels South Charleroi Airport	Base	
Belgium	Ostend	Ostend–Bruges International Airport	Terminated	
Bosnia and Herzegovina	Banja Luka	Banja Luka International Airport		
Bosnia and Herzegovina	Sarajevo	Sarajevo International Airport		
Bosnia and Herzegovina	Tuzla	Tuzla International Airport	Terminated	
Bulgaria	Burgas	Burgas Airport		
Bulgaria	Plovdiv	Plovdiv Airport		
Bulgaria	Sofia	Vasil Levski Sofia Airport	Base	
Bulgaria	Varna	Varna Airport	Seasonal	
Croatia	Dubrovnik	Dubrovnik Airport	Seasonal	
Croatia	Osijek	Osijek Airport	Seasonal	
Croatia	Pula	Pula Airport	Seasonal	
Croatia	Rijeka	Rijeka Airport	Seasonal	
Croatia	Split	Split Airport	Seasonal	
Croatia	Zadar	Zadar Airport	Base (seasonal)	
Croatia	Zagreb	Zagreb Airport	Base	
Cyprus	Larnaca	Larnaca International Airport		
Cyprus	Paphos	Paphos International Airport	Base	
Czech Republic	Brno	Brno–Tuřany Airport		
Czech Republic	Ostrava	Leoš Janáček Airport Ostrava		
Czech Republic	Pardubice	Pardubice Airport	Seasonal	
Czech Republic	Prague	Václav Havel Airport Prague	Base	
Denmark	Aalborg	Aalborg Airport	Terminated	
Denmark	Aarhus	Aarhus Airport		
Denmark	Billund	Billund Airport	Terminated	
Denmark	Copenhagen	Copenhagen Airport		
Denmark	Esbjerg	Esbjerg Airport	Terminated	
Estonia	Tallinn	Tallinn Airport		
Finland	Helsinki	Helsinki Airport		
Finland	Lappeenranta	Lappeenranta Airport	Terminated	
Finland	Rovaniemi	Rovaniemi Airport	Seasonal	
Finland	Tampere	Tampere–Pirkkala Airport	Terminated	
Finland	Turku	Turku Airport	Terminated	
France	Angoulême	Angoulême – Cognac International Airport	Terminated	
France	Beauvais	Beauvais–Tillé Airport	Base	
France	Bergerac	Bergerac Dordogne Périgord Airport		
France	Béziers	Béziers Cap d'Agde Airport		
France	Biarritz	Biarritz Pays Basque Airport		
France	Bordeaux	Bordeaux–Mérignac Airport	Terminated	
France	Brest	Brest Bretagne Airport	Terminated	
France	Brive-la-Gaillarde	Brive–Souillac Airport		
France	Carcassonne	Carcassonne Airport		
France	Châlons	Châlons Vatry Airport		
France	Clermont-Ferrand	Clermont-Ferrand Auvergne Airport		
France	Deauville	Deauville – Normandie Airport	Terminated	
France	Dole	Dole–Jura Airport		
France	Figari	Figari–Sud Corse Airport	Seasonal	
France	Grenoble	Grenoble–Isère Airport	Seasonal	
France	La Rochelle	La Rochelle – Île de Ré Airport		
France	Lille	Lille Airport		
France	Limoges	Limoges – Bellegarde Airport		
France	Lorient	Lorient South Brittany Airport	Terminated	
France	Lourdes/Tarbes	Tarbes–Lourdes–Pyrénées Airport		
France	Lyon	Lyon–Saint-Exupéry Airport	Terminated	
France	Marseille	Marseille Provence Airport	Base	
France	Montpellier	Montpellier–Méditerranée Airport	Terminated	
France	Nantes	Nantes Atlantique Airport		
France	Nice	Nice Côte d'Azur Airport		
France	Nîmes	Nîmes-Alès-Camargue-Cévennes Airport		
France	Pau	Pau Pyrénées Airport	Terminated	
France	Perpignan	Perpignan–Rivesaltes Airport		
France	Poitiers	Poitiers–Biard Airport		
France	Rennes	Rennes–Saint-Jacques Airport	Terminated	
France	Rodez	Rodez–Marcillac Airport	Seasonal	
France	Saint-Étienne	Saint-Étienne–Bouthéon Airport	Terminated	
France	Saint-Malo Dinard	Dinard–Pleurtuit–Saint-Malo Airport	Terminated	
France	Strasbourg	Strasbourg Airport		
France	Toulon	Toulon–Hyères Airport	Terminated	
France	Toulouse	Toulouse–Blagnac Airport	Base	
France	Tours	Tours Val de Loire Airport		
Georgia	Kutaisi	Kutaisi International Airport	Terminated	
Georgia	Tbilisi	Tbilisi International Airport	Terminated	
Germany	Berlin	Berlin Brandenburg Airport	Base	
Germany	Berlin	Berlin Schönefeld Airport	Airport closed	
Germany	Berlin	Berlin Tegel Airport	Airport closed	
Germany	Bremen	Bremen Airport		
Germany	Cologne/Bonn	Cologne Bonn Airport	Base	
Germany	Dortmund	Dortmund Airport	Terminated	
Germany	Dresden	Dresden Airport	Terminated	
Germany	Düsseldorf	Düsseldorf Airport	Terminated	
Germany	Erfurt	Erfurt–Weimar Airport	Terminated	
Germany	Frankfurt	Frankfurt Airport	Terminated	
Germany	Hahn	Frankfurt–Hahn Airport	Base	
Germany	Friedrichshafen	Friedrichshafen Airport	Seasonal	
Germany	Hamburg	Hamburg Airport		
Germany	Hanover	Hannover Airport	Terminated	
Germany	Karlsruhe/Baden-Baden	Karlsruhe/Baden-Baden Airport	Base	
Germany	Leipzig	Leipzig/Halle Airport	Terminated	
Germany	Leipzig	Leipzig–Altenburg Airport	Terminated	
Germany	Lübeck	Lübeck Airport		
Germany	Magdeburg	Magdeburg–Cochstedt Airport	Terminated	
Germany	Memmingen	Memmingen Airport	Base	
Germany	Munich	Munich Airport	Terminated	
Germany	Münster	Münster Osnabrück Airport		
Germany	Nuremberg	Nuremberg Airport	Base	
Germany	Paderborn	Paderborn Lippstadt Airport		
Germany	Rostock	Rostock–Laage Airport	Terminated	
Germany	Saarbrücken	Saarbrücken Airport		
Germany	Stuttgart	Stuttgart Airport	Terminated	
Germany	Weeze	Weeze Airport	Base	
Germany	Zweibrücken	Zweibrücken Airport	Terminated	
Greece	Alexandroupolis	Alexandroupoli Airport	Terminated	
Greece	Athens	Athens International Airport	Base	
Greece	Chania	Chania International Airport	Base	
Greece	Corfu	Corfu International Airport	Base	
Greece	Heraklion	Heraklion International Airport	Seasonal	
Greece	Kalamata	Kalamata International Airport	Seasonal	
Greece	Kavala	Kavala International Airport	Terminated	
Greece	Kefalonia	Kefalonia International Airport	Seasonal	
Greece	Kos	Kos International Airport	Seasonal	
Greece	Lemnos	Lemnos International Airport "Hephaestus"		
Greece	Mykonos	Mykonos Airport	Seasonal	
Greece	Patras	Patras Araxos Airport	Terminated	
Greece	Preveza/Lefkada	Aktion National Airport	Seasonal	
Greece	Rhodes	Rhodes International Airport	Base	
Greece	Santorini	Santorini International Airport	Seasonal	
Greece	Skiathos	Skiathos Airport	Seasonal	
Greece	Thessaloniki	Thessaloniki Airport	Base	
Greece	Volos	Nea Anchialos National Airport	Seasonal	
Greece	Zakynthos	Zakynthos International Airport	Seasonal	
Hungary	Balaton	Hévíz–Balaton Airport	Terminated	
Hungary	Budapest	Budapest Ferenc Liszt International Airport	Base	
Ireland	Cork	Cork Airport	Base	
Ireland	Donegal	Donegal Airport	Terminated	
Ireland	Dublin	Dublin Airport	Headquarters	
Ireland	Galway	Galway Airport	Airport closed	
Ireland	Kerry	Kerry Airport		
Ireland	Knock	Ireland West Airport		
Ireland	Shannon	Shannon Airport	Base	
Ireland	Waterford	Waterford Airport	Airport closed	
Israel	Eilat	Ovda Airport	Airport closed	
Israel	Eilat	Ramon Airport	Terminated	
Israel	Tel Aviv	Ben Gurion Airport	Terminated	
Italy	Alghero	Alghero–Fertilia Airport		
Italy	Ancona	Marche Airport		
Italy	Bari	Bari Karol Wojtyła Airport	Base	
Italy	Bologna	Bologna Guglielmo Marconi Airport	Base	
Italy	Brescia	Brescia Airport	Terminated	
Italy	Brindisi	Brindisi Airport	Base	
Italy	Cagliari	Cagliari Elmas Airport	Base	
Italy	Catania	Catania–Fontanarossa Airport	Base	
Italy	Comiso	Comiso Airport	Terminated	
Italy	Crotone	Crotone Airport		
Italy	Cuneo	Cuneo Airport		
Italy	Forlì	Forlì Airport		
Italy	Genoa	Genoa Cristoforo Colombo Airport		
Italy	Lamezia Terme	Lamezia Terme International Airport	Base	
Italy	Milan	Milan Malpensa Airport	Base	
Italy	Milan	Milan Bergamo Airport	Base	
Italy	Naples	Naples International Airport	Base	
Italy	Olbia	Olbia Costa Smeralda Airport		
Italy	Palermo	Falcone Borsellino Airport	Base	
Italy	Parma	Parma Airport		
Italy	Perugia	Perugia San Francesco d'Assisi – Umbria International Airport		
Italy	Pescara	Abruzzo Airport	Base	
Italy	Pisa	Pisa International Airport	Base	
Italy	Reggio Calabria	Reggio Calabria Airport	Base	
Italy	Rimini	Federico Fellini International Airport	Seasonal	
Italy	Rome	Rome Ciampino Airport	Base	
Italy	Rome	Rome Fiumicino Airport	Base	
Italy	Salerno	Salerno Costa d'Amalfi Airport		
Italy	Trapani	Vincenzo Florio Airport Trapani–Birgi	Base	
Italy	Trieste	Trieste – Friuli Venezia Giulia Airport	Base	
Italy	Turin	Turin Airport	Base	
Italy	Venice	Venice Marco Polo Airport	Base	
Italy	Venice	Treviso Airport	Base	
Italy	Verona	Verona Villafranca Airport		
Jordan	Amman	Queen Alia International Airport		
Jordan	Aqaba	King Hussein International Airport		
Latvia	Riga	Riga International Airport	Base	
Lebanon	Beirut	Beirut–Rafic Hariri International Airport	Terminated	
Lithuania	Kaunas	Kaunas Airport	Base	
Lithuania	Palanga	Palanga International Airport		
Lithuania	Vilnius	Vilnius Čiurlionis International Airport	Base	
Luxembourg	Luxembourg City	Luxembourg Airport		
Malta	Valletta Luqa	Malta International Airport	Base	
Montenegro	Podgorica	Podgorica Airport		
Morocco	Agadir	Agadir–Al Massira Airport	Base	
Morocco	Beni Mellal	Beni Mellal Airport		
Morocco	Casablanca	Mohammed V International Airport	Terminated	
Morocco	Errachidia	Moulay Ali Cherif Airport		
Morocco	Essaouira	Essaouira-Mogador Airport		
Morocco	Fez	Fes–Saïss Airport	Base	
Morocco	Marrakesh	Marrakesh Menara Airport	Base	
Morocco	Nador	Nador International Airport		
Morocco	Ouarzazate	Ouarzazate Airport		
Morocco	Oujda	Angads Airport		
Morocco	Rabat	Rabat–Salé Airport		
Morocco	Tangier	Tangier Ibn Battouta Airport	Base	
Morocco	Tétouan	Sania Ramel Airport		
Netherlands	Amsterdam	Amsterdam Airport Schiphol		
Netherlands	Eindhoven	Eindhoven Airport		
Netherlands	Groningen	Groningen Airport Eelde	Terminated	
Netherlands	Maastricht	Maastricht Aachen Airport	Terminated	
Norway	Haugesund	Haugesund Airport	Terminated	
Norway	Oslo	Oslo Gardermoen Airport		
Norway	Sandefjord	Sandefjord Torp Airport		
Norway	Rygge	Moss Airport, Rygge	Terminated	
Poland	Bydgoszcz	Bydgoszcz Ignacy Jan Paderewski Airport		
Poland	Gdańsk	Gdańsk Lech Wałęsa Airport	Base	
Poland	Katowice	Katowice Airport	Base	
Poland	Kraków	Kraków John Paul II International Airport	Base	
Poland	Łódź	Łódź Władysław Reymont Airport		
Poland	Lublin	Lublin Airport		
Poland	Olsztyn	Olsztyn-Mazury Airport		
Poland	Poznań	Poznań–Ławica Airport	Base	
Poland	Rzeszów	Rzeszów–Jasionka Airport		
Poland	Szczecin	"Solidarity" Szczecin–Goleniów Airport		
Poland	Warsaw	Warsaw Chopin Airport		
Poland	Warsaw	Warsaw Modlin Airport	Base	
Poland	Wrocław	Wrocław Airport	Base	
Portugal	Faro	Gago Coutinho Airport	Base	
Portugal	Funchal	Cristiano Ronaldo International Airport	Base	
Portugal	Lisbon	Humberto Delgado Airport	Base	
Portugal	Ponta Delgada	João Paulo II Airport	Terminated	
Portugal	Porto	Francisco Sá Carneiro Airport	Base	
Portugal	Terceira Island	Lajes Airport	Terminated	
Romania	Arad	Arad International Airport	Terminated	
Romania	Bucharest	Bucharest Aurel Vlaicu International Airport		
Romania	Bucharest	Bucharest Henri Coandă International Airport	Base	
Romania	Cluj-Napoca	Avram Iancu Cluj International Airport		
Romania	Constanța	Mihail Kogălniceanu International Airport	Terminated	
Romania	Craiova	Craiova International Airport	Terminated	
Romania	Iași	Iași International Airport		
Romania	Oradea	Oradea International Airport	Terminated	
Romania	Sibiu	Sibiu International Airport	Terminated	
Romania	Suceava	Suceava Ștefan cel Mare International Airport	Terminated	
Romania	Târgu Mureș	Târgu Mureș International Airport	Terminated	
Romania	Timișoara	Timișoara Traian Vuia International Airport	Terminated	
Serbia	Niš	Niš Constantine the Great Airport		
Slovakia	Bratislava	Bratislava Airport	Base	
Slovakia	Košice	Košice International Airport		
Slovakia	Poprad	Poprad–Tatry Airport		
Slovenia	Maribor	Maribor Edvard Rusjan Airport	Terminated	
Spain	Alicante	Alicante–Elche Miguel Hernández Airport	Base	
Spain	Almería	Almería Airport	Seasonal	
Spain	Asturias	Asturias Airport	Terminated	
Spain	Barcelona	Josep Tarradellas Barcelona–El Prat Airport	Base	
Spain	Bilbao	Bilbao Airport	Terminated	
Spain	Castellón	Castellón–Costa Azahar Airport		
Spain	Ciudad Real	Ciudad Real Central Airport	Terminated	
Spain	Fuerteventura	Fuerteventura Airport		
Spain	Girona	Girona–Costa Brava Airport		
Spain	Granada	Granada Airport	Terminated	
Spain	Ibiza	Ibiza Airport	Base	
Spain	Jerez de la Frontera	Jerez Airport	Terminated	
Spain	Lanzarote	Lanzarote Airport		
Spain	La Palma	La Palma Airport	Terminated	
Spain	Las Palmas	Gran Canaria Airport		
Spain	Madrid	Adolfo Suárez Madrid–Barajas Airport	Base	
Spain	Málaga	Málaga Airport	Base	
Spain	Menorca	Menorca Airport	Seasonal	
Spain	Murcia	Región de Murcia International Airport		
Spain	Murcia	Murcia–San Javier Airport	Airport closed	
Spain	Palma de Mallorca	Palma de Mallorca Airport	Base	
Spain	Reus	Reus Airport		
Spain	Santander	Santander Airport		
Spain	Santiago de Compostela	Santiago–Rosalía de Castro Airport	Base	
Spain	Seville	Seville Airport	Base	
Spain	Tenerife	Tenerife North Airport		
Spain	Tenerife	Tenerife South Airport		
Spain	Valencia	Valencia Airport	Base	
Spain	Valladolid	Valladolid Airport	Terminated	
Spain	Vigo	Vigo–Peinador Airport	Terminated	
Spain	Vitoria-Gasteiz	Vitoria Airport		
Spain	Zaragoza	Zaragoza Airport		
Sweden	Ängelholm	Ängelholm–Helsingborg Airport	Terminated	
Sweden	Gothenburg	Göteborg Landvetter Airport	Base	
Sweden	Gothenburg	Säve Airport	Terminated	
Sweden	Jönköping	Jönköping Airport	Terminated	
Sweden	Kalmar	Kalmar Airport	Terminated	
Sweden	Karlstad	Karlstad Airport	Terminated	
Sweden	Kristianstad	Kristianstad Airport	Terminated	
Sweden	Luleå	Luleå Airport	Terminated	
Sweden	Malmö	Malmö Airport		
Sweden	Norrköping	Norrköping Airport	Terminated	
Sweden	Örebro	Örebro Airport	Seasonal	
Sweden	Skellefteå	Skellefteå Airport		
Sweden	Stockholm	Stockholm Arlanda Airport	Base	
Sweden	Stockholm	Stockholm Skavsta Airport	Terminated	
Sweden	Västerås	Stockholm Västerås Airport	Seasonal	
Sweden	Växjö	Växjö Småland Airport		
Sweden	Visby	Visby Airport	Terminated	
Switzerland; France; Germany	Basel; Mulhouse; Freiburg	EuroAirport Basel Mulhouse Freiburg		
Turkey	Bodrum	Milas–Bodrum Airport	Seasonal	
Turkey	Dalaman	Dalaman Airport	Seasonal	
Ukraine	Kharkiv	Kharkiv International Airport	Terminated	
Ukraine	Kyiv	Boryspil International Airport	Terminated	
Ukraine	Kherson	Kherson International Airport	Terminated	
Ukraine	Lviv	Lviv Danylo Halytskyi International Airport	Terminated	
Ukraine	Odesa	Odesa International Airport	Terminated	
United Kingdom	Aberdeen	Aberdeen Airport		
United Kingdom	Belfast	George Best Belfast City Airport	Terminated	
United Kingdom	Belfast	Belfast International Airport	Base	
United Kingdom	Birmingham	Birmingham Airport	Base	
United Kingdom	Blackpool	Blackpool Airport	Airport closed	
United Kingdom	Bournemouth	Bournemouth Airport	Base	
United Kingdom	Bristol	Bristol Airport	Base	
United Kingdom	Cardiff	Cardiff Airport		
United Kingdom	Derry	City of Derry Airport		
United Kingdom	Doncaster/Sheffield	Doncaster Sheffield Airport	Airport closed	
United Kingdom	East Midlands	East Midlands Airport	Base	
United Kingdom	Edinburgh	Edinburgh Airport	Base	
United Kingdom	Exeter	Exeter Airport		
United Kingdom	Glasgow	Glasgow Airport		
United Kingdom	Glasgow	Glasgow Prestwick Airport	Base	
United Kingdom	Humberside	Humberside Airport	Terminated	
United Kingdom	Inverness	Inverness Airport	Terminated	
United Kingdom	Leeds/Bradford	Leeds Bradford Airport	Base	
United Kingdom	Liverpool	Liverpool John Lennon Airport	Base	
United Kingdom	London	Gatwick Airport		
United Kingdom	London	Luton Airport	Base	
United Kingdom	London	London Southend Airport	Terminated	
United Kingdom	London	London Stansted Airport	Largest base	
United Kingdom	Manchester	Manchester Airport	Base	
United Kingdom	Newcastle upon Tyne	Newcastle International Airport	Base	
United Kingdom	Newquay	Newquay Airport		
United Kingdom	Norwich	Norwich Airport		
United Kingdom	Teesside	Teesside International Airport		
Western Sahara (Note: Disputed. See Western Sahara..)	Dakhla	Dakhla Airport		

== Top airports by destinations ==
Top airports by destinations 2007–17
City	destinations	retention
(Republic of Ireland) Dublin	185	73%
(United Kingdom) London Stansted	132	69%
(Italy) Bergamo	124	65%
(Belgium) Charleroi	116	70%
(Spain) Girona	112	35%
(Germany) Hahn	103	44%
(Germany) Weeze	97	45%
(Spain) Alicante	90	61%
(Spain) Madrid	86	57%
(Italy) Pisa	86	53%
