= List of the busiest airports in Poland =

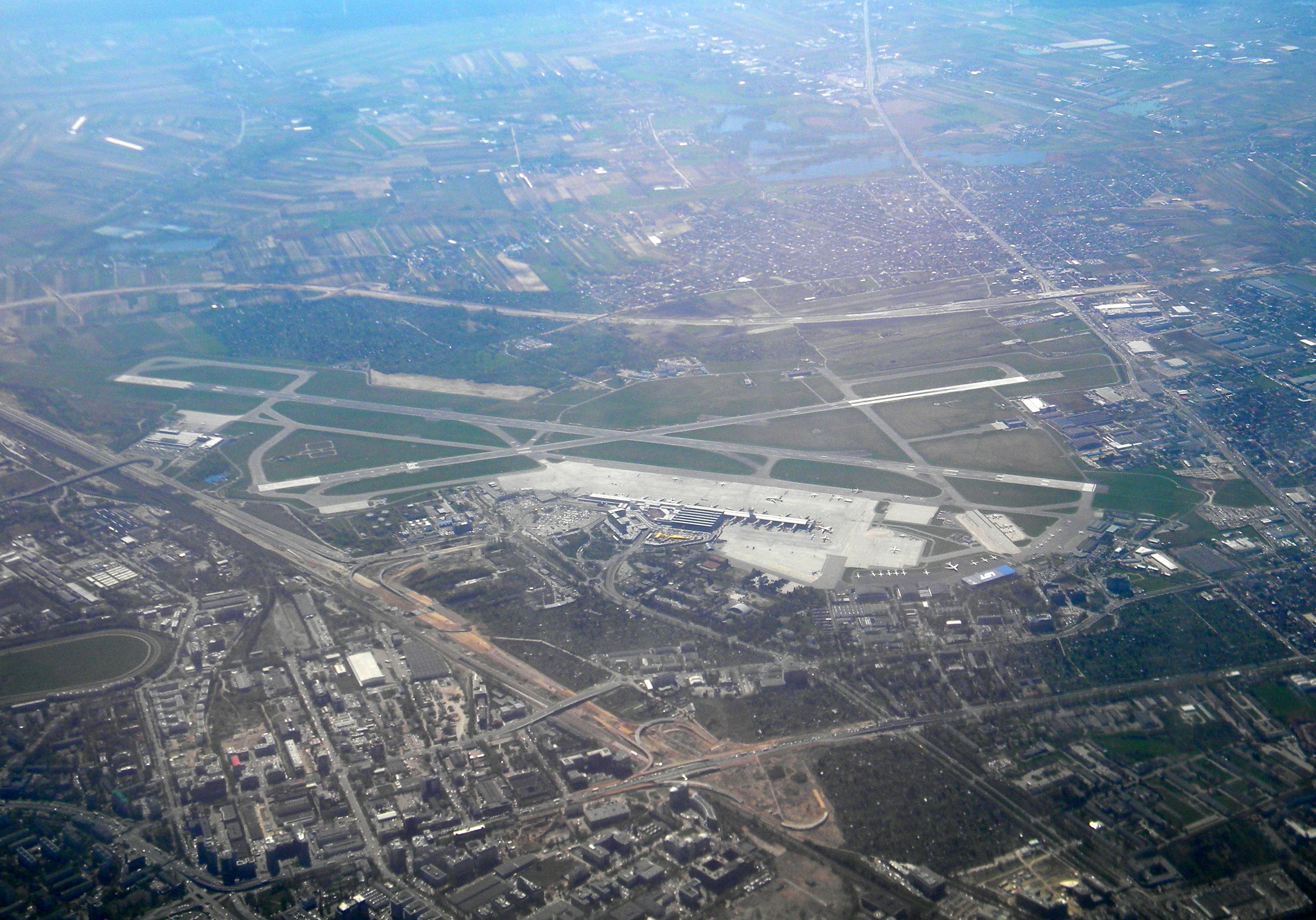
Warsaw Chopin Airport, the busiest airport in Poland

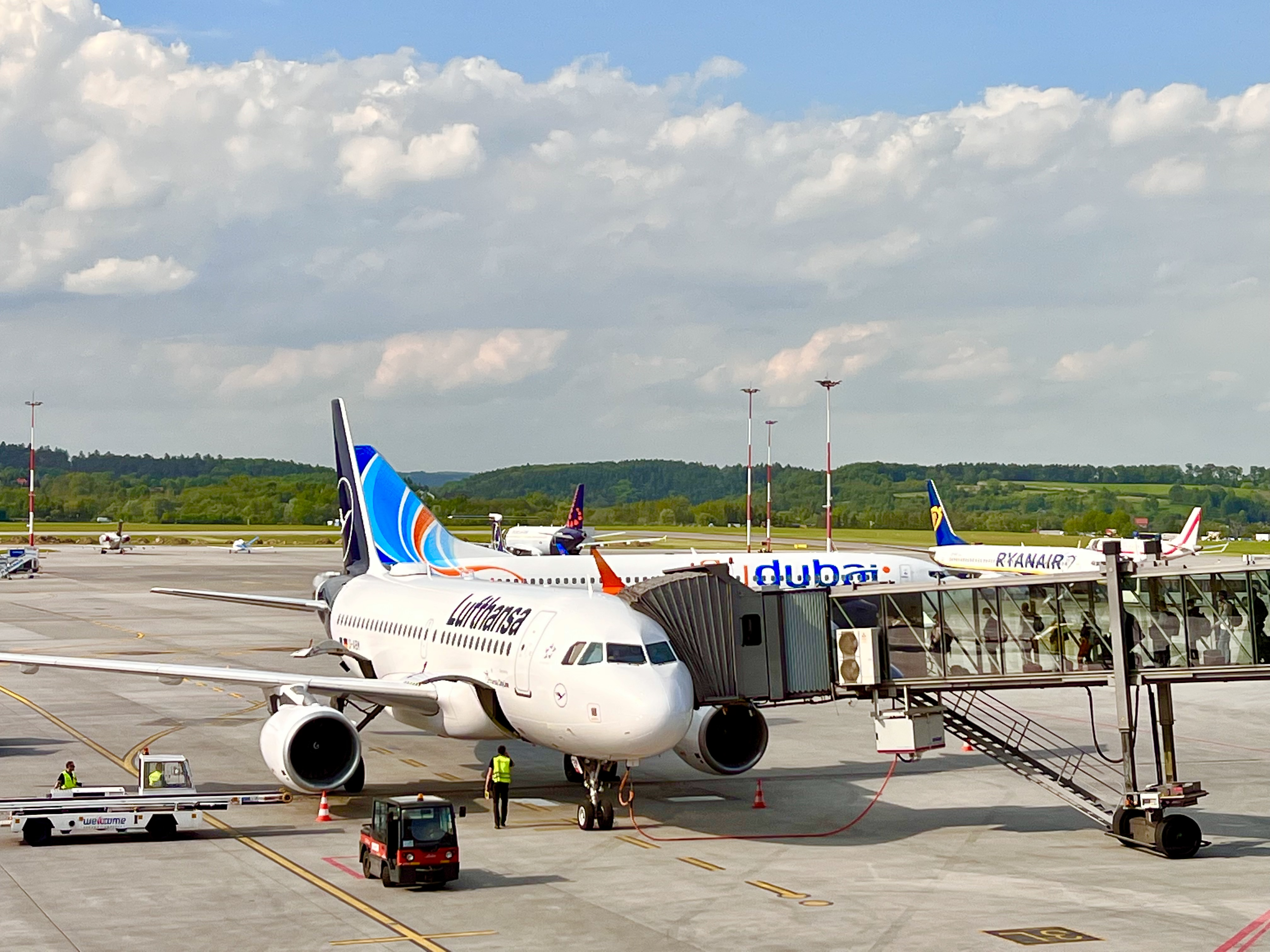
Kraków Airport, the second busiest airport in Poland

This is a list of the busiest airports in Poland.

== 2025 ==
Rank	Airport	City served	IATA	ICAO	Passengers	Annual change	Rank change
1.	Warsaw Chopin Airport	Warsaw	WAW	EPWA	24,097,059	▲13.2%	Steady
2.	Kraków Airport	Kraków	KRK	EPKK	13,248,355	▲19.6%	Steady
3.	Gdańsk Lech Wałęsa Airport	Gdańsk (Tricity)	GDN	EPGD	7,393,016	▲10.1%	Steady
4.	Katowice Airport	Katowice (Metropolis GZM)	KTW	EPKT	7,299,085	▲14.3%	Steady
5.	Wrocław Airport	Wrocław	WRO	EPWR	4,907,527	▲9.7%	Steady
6.	Poznań Airport	Poznań	POZ	EPPO	4,144,829	▲14.9%	Steady
7.	Warsaw Modlin Airport	Warsaw	WMI	EPMO	1,752,485	▼37.3%	Steady
8.	Rzeszów International Airport	Rzeszów	RZE	EPRZ	1,280,000	▲11.8%	Steady
9.	Łódź Airport	Łódź	LCJ	EPLL	488,813	▲13.4%	▲1
10.	Lublin Airport	Lublin	LUZ	EPLB	471,101	▲10.6%	▲1
11.	Solidarity Szczecin–Goleniów Airport	Szczecin	SZZ	EPSC	467,758	▼3.1%	▼2
12.	Bydgoszcz Airport	Bydgoszcz	BZG	EPBY	439,836	▲20.1%	Steady
13.	Warsaw Radom Airport^{1}	Radom	RDO	EPRA	95,646	▼15.1%	Steady
14.	Olsztyn-Mazury Airport	Olsztyn	SZY	EPSY	89,151	▲23.4%	▲1
15.	Airport Zielona Góra	Zielona Góra	IEG	EPZG	80,729	▼2.6%	▼1
Total					66,255,390	▲11.4%	

== 2024 ==
Rank	Airport	City served	IATA	ICAO	Passengers	Annual change	Rank change
1.	Warsaw Chopin Airport	Warsaw	WAW	EPWA	21,283,397	▲15.0%	Steady
2.	Kraków Airport	Kraków	KRK	EPKK	11,081,250	▲17.8%	Steady
3.	Gdańsk Lech Wałęsa Airport	Gdańsk (Tricity)	GDN	EPGD	6,714,149	▲13.7%	Steady
4.	Katowice Airport	Katowice (Metropolis GZM)	KTW	EPKT	6,386,145	▲13.9%	Steady
5.	Wrocław Airport	Wrocław	WRO	EPWR	4,473,545	▲15.0%	Steady
6.	Poznań Airport	Poznań	POZ	EPPO	3,607,714	▲29.3%	▲1
7.	Warsaw Modlin Airport	Warsaw	WMI	EPMO	2,794,531	▼17.8%	▼1
8.	Rzeszów International Airport	Rzeszów	RZE	EPRZ	1,145,257	▲12.3%	Steady
9.	Solidarity Szczecin–Goleniów Airport	Szczecin	SZZ	EPSC	482,914	▲1.1%	Steady
10.	Łódź Airport	Łódź	LCJ	EPLL	431,142	▲20.8%	Steady
11.	Lublin Airport	Lublin	LUZ	EPLB	425,811	▲6.8%	▲1
12.	Bydgoszcz Airport	Bydgoszcz	BZG	EPBY	370,043	▲1.1%	▼1
13.	Warsaw Radom Airport^{1}	Radom	RDO	EPRA	114,984	▲10.4%	▲1
14.	Airport Zielona Góra	Zielona Góra	IEG	EPZG	82,887	▲53.6%	▲1
15.	Olsztyn-Mazury Airport	Olsztyn	SZY	EPSY	72,444	▼49.2%	▼2
Total					59,500,000	▲13.44%	

== 2023 ==
Rank	Airport	City served	IATA	ICAO	Passengers	Annual change	Rank change
1.	Warsaw Chopin Airport	Warsaw	WAW	EPWA	18,499,527	▲28.5%	Steady
2.	Kraków Airport	Kraków	KRK	EPKK	9,404,611	▲27.0%	Steady
3.	Gdańsk Lech Wałęsa Airport	Gdańsk (Tricity)	GDN	EPGD	5,907,280	▲29.0%	Steady
4.	Katowice Airport	Katowice (Metropolis GZM)	KTW	EPKT	5,609,022	▲26.9%	Steady
5.	Wrocław Airport	Wrocław	WRO	EPWR	3,891,553	▲35.2%	Steady
6.	Warsaw Modlin Airport	Warsaw	WMI	EPMO	3,400,967	▲8.9%	Steady
7.	Poznań Airport	Poznań	POZ	EPPO	2,788,990	▲23.8%	Steady
8.	Rzeszów International Airport	Rzeszów	RZE	EPRZ	1,020,189	▲42.2%	Steady
9.	"Solidarity" Szczecin–Goleniów Airport	Szczecin	SZZ	EPSC	477,494	▲13.7%	Steady
10.	Lublin Airport	Lublin	LUZ	EPLB	420,208	▲28.6%	Steady
11.	Bydgoszcz Airport	Bydgoszcz	BZG	EPBY	366,067	▲43.9%	Steady
12.	Łódź Airport	Łódź	LCJ	EPLL	356,878	▲98.0%	Steady
13.	Olsztyn-Mazury Airport	Olsztyn	SZY	EPSY	112,667	▲30.9%	Steady
14.	Warsaw Radom Airport^{1}	Radom	RDO	EPRA	105,000	---	Steady
15.	Airport Zielona Góra	Zielona Góra	IEG	EPZG	53.963	▲28.0%	Steady
Total					52,200,000	▲27.4%	

== 2022 ==
Rank	Airport	City served	IATA	ICAO	Passengers	Annual change	Rank change
1.	Warsaw Chopin Airport	Warsaw	WAW	EPWA	14,413,889	▲92.9%	Steady
2.	Kraków Airport	Kraków	KRK	EPKK	7,394,176	▲140.7%	Steady
3.	Gdańsk Lech Wałęsa Airport	Gdańsk (Tricity)	GDN	EPGD	4,576,705	▲112.4%	▲1
4.	Katowice Airport	Katowice (Metropolis GZM)	KTW	EPKT	4,419,090	▲89.7%	▼1
5.	Warsaw Modlin Airport	Warsaw	WMI	EPMO	3,126,482	▲123.8%	▲1
6.	Wrocław Airport	Wrocław	WRO	EPWR	2,878,482	▲102.9%	▼1
7.	Poznań Airport	Poznań	POZ	EPPO	2,252,162	▲113.4%	Steady
8.	Rzeszów International Airport	Rzeszów	RZE	EPRZ	731,141	▲39.5%	Steady
9.	"Solidarity" Szczecin–Goleniów Airport	Szczecin	SZZ	EPSC	419,905	▲130.9%	Steady
10.	Lublin Airport	Lublin	LUZ	EPLB	330,064	▲207.3%	Steady
11.	Bydgoszcz Airport	Bydgoszcz	BZG	EPBY	254,361	▲156.1%	Steady
12.	Łódź Airport	Łódź	LCJ	EPLL	179,926	▲159.6%	Steady
13.	Olsztyn-Mazury Airport	Olsztyn	SZY	EPSY	142,252	▲25.7%	Steady
14.	Airport Zielona Góra	Zielona Góra	IEG	EPZG	42,103	▲98.7%	Steady
Total					41,131,524	▲120%	

== 2021 ==
Rank	Airport	City served	IATA	ICAO	Passengers	Annual change	Rank change
1.	Warsaw Chopin Airport	Warsaw	WAW	EPWA	7,473,734	▲36.3%	Steady
2.	Kraków Airport	Kraków	KRK	EPKK	3,072,074	▲18.6%	Steady
3.	Katowice Airport	Katowice (Metropolis GZM)	KTW	EPKT	2,328,973	▲61.1%	▲1
4.	Gdańsk Lech Wałęsa Airport	Gdańsk (Tricity)	GDN	EPGD	2,154,563	▲26.0%	▼1
5.	Wrocław Airport	Wrocław	WRO	EPWR	1,418,836	▲40.8%	Steady
6.	Warsaw Modlin Airport	Warsaw	WMI	EPMO	1,396,833	▲66.7%	Steady
7.	Poznań Airport	Poznań	POZ	EPPO	1,055,162	▲60.4%	Steady
8.	Rzeszów International Airport	Rzeszów	RZE	EPRZ	255,795	▲8.7%	Steady
9.	"Solidarity" Szczecin–Goleniów Airport	Szczecin	SZZ	EPSC	181,849	▼2.2%	Steady
10.	Lublin Airport	Lublin	LUZ	EPLB	107,423	▼13.0%	▲1
11.	Bydgoszcz Airport	Bydgoszcz	BZG	EPBY	99,303	▼22.4%	▼1
12.	Łódź Airport	Łódź	LCJ	EPLL	69,320	▼8.0%	Steady
13.	Olsztyn-Mazury Airport	Olsztyn	SZY	EPSY	46,936	▼24.8%	Steady
14.	Airport Zielona Góra	Zielona Góra	IEG	EPZG	21,188	▲8.0%	Steady
Total					19,600,000	▲35.5%	

== 2020 ==
Rank	Airport	City served	IATA	ICAO	Passengers	Annual change	Rank change
1.	Warsaw Chopin Airport	Warsaw	WAW	EPWA	5,437,224	▼71.0%	Steady
2.	Kraków Airport	Kraków	KRK	EPKK	2,588,970	▼69.2%	Steady
3.	Gdańsk Lech Wałęsa Airport	Gdańsk (Tricity)	GDN	EPGD	1,697,406	▼68.3%	Steady
4.	Katowice Airport	Katowice (Metropolis GZM)	KTW	EPKT	1,437,876	▼70.3%	Steady
5.	Wrocław Airport	Wrocław	WRO	EPWR	1,003,066	▼71.7%	Steady
6.	Warsaw Modlin Airport	Warsaw	WMI	EPMO	870,831	▼71.9%	Steady
7.	Poznań Airport	Poznań	POZ	EPPO	652,833	▼72.5%	Steady
8.	Rzeszów International Airport	Rzeszów	RZE	EPRZ	234,355	▼69.5%	Steady
9.	"Solidarity" Szczecin–Goleniów Airport	Szczecin	SZZ	EPSC	185,848	▼68.0%	Steady
10.	Bydgoszcz Airport	Bydgoszcz	BZG	EPBY	124,545	▼69.9%	Steady
11.	Lublin Airport	Lublin	LUZ	EPLB	123,512	▼65.3%	Steady
12.	Łódź Airport	Łódź	LCJ	EPLL	75,275,	▼68.9%	Steady
13.	Olsztyn-Mazury Airport	Olsztyn	SZY	EPSY	61,114	▼58.6%	Steady
14.	Airport Zielona Góra	Zielona Góra	IEG	EPZG	19,266	▼41.8%	Steady
Total					14 500 000	▼70.0%	

== 2019 ==
Rank	Airport	City served	IATA	ICAO	Passengers	Annual change	Rank change
1.	Warsaw Chopin Airport	Warsaw	WAW	EPWA	18,857,686	▲6.3%	Steady
2.	Kraków Airport	Kraków	KRK	EPKK	8,410,817	▲24.3%	Steady
3.	Gdańsk Lech Wałęsa Airport	Gdańsk (Tricity)	GDN	EPGD	5,376,120	▲7.9%	Steady
4.	Katowice Airport	Katowice (Metropolis GZM)	KTW	EPKT	4,843,889	▲0.1%	Steady
5.	Wrocław Airport	Wrocław	WRO	EPWR	3,548,016	▲6.0%	Steady
6.	Warsaw Modlin Airport	Warsaw	WMI	EPMO	3,106,041	▲0.8%	Steady
7.	Poznań Airport	Poznań	POZ	EPPO	2,379,635	▼3.9%	Steady
8.	Rzeszów International Airport	Rzeszów	RZE	EPRZ	772,238	▲0.1%	Steady
9.	"Solidarity" Szczecin–Goleniów Airport	Szczecin	SZZ	EPSC	576,037	▼3.8%	Steady
10.	Bydgoszcz Airport	Bydgoszcz	BZG	EPBY	425,230	▲2.9%	▲1
11.	Lublin Airport	Lublin	LUZ	EPLB	357,366	▼21.5%	▼1
12.	Łódź Airport	Łódź	LCJ	EPLL	241,707,	▲11.2%	Steady
13.	Olsztyn-Mazury Airport	Olsztyn	SZY	EPSY	154,499	▲27.4%	Steady
14.	Airport Zielona Góra	Zielona Góra	IEG	EPZG	33,783	▲54.0%	Steady
Total					49 083 019	▲7%	

== 2018 ==
Rank	Airport	City served	IATA	ICAO	Passengers	Annual change	Rank change
1.	Warsaw Chopin Airport	Warsaw	WAW	EPWA	17,755,500	▲12.7%	Steady
2.	Kraków Airport	Kraków	KRK	EPKK	6,769,369	▲16.0%	Steady
3.	Gdańsk Lech Wałęsa Airport	Gdańsk (Tricity)	GDN	EPGD	4,980,647	▲8.0%	Steady
4.	Katowice Airport	Katowice (Metropolis GZM)	KTW	EPKT	4,838,149	▲23.0%	Steady
5.	Wrocław Airport	Wrocław	WRO	EPWR	3,347,223	▲17.3%	▲1
6.	Warsaw Modlin Airport	Warsaw	WMI	EPMO	3,081,966	▲5.1%	▼1
7.	Poznań Airport	Poznań	POZ	EPPO	2,476,304	▲33.7%	Steady
8.	Rzeszów International Airport	Rzeszów	RZE	EPRZ	771,287	▲11.2%	Steady
9.	"Solidarity" Szczecin–Goleniów Airport	Szczecin	SZZ	EPSC	598,971	▲3.5%	Steady
10.	Lublin Airport	Lublin	LUZ	EPLB	455,188	▲9.0%	Steady
11.	Bydgoszcz Airport	Bydgoszcz	BZG	EPBY	413,245	▲24.7%	Steady
12.	Łódź Airport	Łódź	LCJ	EPLL	217,014	▲2.9%	Steady
13.	Olsztyn-Mazury Airport	Olsztyn	SZY	EPSY	121,300	▲15.0%	Steady
14.	Airport Zielona Góra	Zielona Góra	IEG	EPZG	21,934	▲23.9%	Steady
15.	Radom Airport	Radom	RDO	EPRA	closed		
Total					45,848,097	▲15.0%	

== 2017 ==
Rank	Airport	City served	IATA	ICAO	Passengers	Annual change	Rank change
1.	Warsaw Chopin Airport	Warsaw	WAW	EPWA	15,752,000	▲22.7%	Steady
2.	Kraków Airport	Kraków	KRK	EPKK	5,835,189	▲17.0%	Steady
3.	Gdańsk Lech Wałęsa Airport	Gdańsk (Tricity)	GDN	EPGD	4,611,714	▲14.6%	Steady
4.	Katowice Airport	Katowice (Metropolis GZM)	KTW	EPKT	3,892,941	▲20.8%	Steady
5.	Warsaw Modlin Airport	Warsaw	WMI	EPMO	2,932,639	▲0.2%	Steady
6.	Wrocław Airport	Wrocław	WRO	EPWR	2,855,071	▲17.9%	Steady
7.	Poznań Airport	Poznań	POZ	EPPO	1,852,655	▲8.3%	Steady
8.	Rzeszów International Airport	Rzeszów	RZE	EPRZ	693,500	▲4.4%	Steady
9.	"Solidarity" Szczecin–Goleniów Airport	Szczecin	SZZ	EPSC	578,691	▲23.6%	Steady
10.	Lublin Airport	Lublin	LUZ	EPLB	430,346	▲13.9%	Steady
11.	Bydgoszcz Airport	Bydgoszcz	BZG	EPBY	331,300	▼1.8%	Steady
12.	Łódź Airport	Łódź	LCJ	EPLL	204,676	▼16.2%	Steady
13.	Olsztyn-Mazury Airport	Olsztyn	SZY	EPSY	104,851	▲222.3%	Steady
14.	Airport Zielona Góra	Zielona Góra	IEG	EPZG	17,702	▲87.4%	▲1
15.	Radom Airport	Radom	RDO	EPRA	11,000	▲16.5%	▼1
Total					40,104,275	▲17.2%	

== 2016 ==
Rank	Airport	City served	IATA	ICAO	Passengers	Annual change	Rank change
1.	Warsaw Chopin Airport	Warsaw	WAW	EPWA	12,836,510	▲14.5%	Steady
2.	Kraków Airport	Kraków	KRK	EPKK	4,983,645	▲18.0%	Steady
3.	Gdańsk Lech Wałęsa Airport	Gdańsk (Tricity)	GDN	EPGD	4,010,846	▲8.2%	Steady
4.	Katowice Airport	Katowice (Metropolis GZM)	KTW	EPKT	3,221,261	▲4.9%	Steady
5.	Warsaw Modlin Airport	Warsaw	WMI	EPMO	2,860,874	▲10.5%	Steady
6.	Wrocław Airport	Wrocław	WRO	EPWR	2,419,561	▲4.3%	Steady
7.	Poznań Airport	Poznań	POZ	EPPO	1,710,116	▲13.9%	Steady
8.	Rzeszów International Airport	Rzeszów	RZE	EPRZ	664,068	▲2.9%	Steady
9.	"Solidarity" Szczecin–Goleniów Airport	Szczecin	SZZ	EPSC	467,877	▲13.4%	Steady
10.	Lublin Airport	Lublin	LUZ	EPLB	377,606	▲42.4%	▲2
11.	Bydgoszcz Airport	Bydgoszcz	BZG	EPBY	337,556	▼1.0%	▼1
12.	Łódź Airport	Łódź	LCJ	EPLL	241,076	▼16.2%	▼1
13.	Olsztyn-Mazury Airport^{1}	Olsztyn	SZY	EPSY	47,146	---	---
14.	Radom Airport	Radom	RDO	EPRA	9,713	▲1099.1%	▲1
15.	Airport Zielona Góra	Zielona Góra	IEG	EPZG	9,443	▼44.8%	▼2
Total					34,197,298	▲12.0%	

Notes:

^{1}: Olsztyn-Mazury Airport commenced operation on 20,January 2016.

== 2015 ==
Rank	Airport	City served	IATA	ICAO	Passengers	Annual change	Rank change
1.	Warsaw Chopin Airport	Warsaw	WAW	EPWA	11,219,779	▲6.3%	Steady
2.	Kraków Airport	Kraków	KRK	EPKK	4,221,171	▲10.5%	Steady
3.	Gdańsk Lech Wałęsa Airport	Gdańsk (Tricity)	GDN	EPDG	3,706,180	▲12.7%	Steady
4.	Katowice Airport	Katowice (Metropolis GZM)	KTW	EPKT	3,069,279	▲13.9%	Steady
5.	Warsaw Modlin Airport	Warsaw	WMI	EPMO	2,588,175	▲52.0%	Steady
6.	Wrocław Airport	Wrocław	WRO	EPWR	2,320,015	▲11.2%	Steady
7.	Poznań Airport	Poznań	POZ	EPPO	1,500,918	▲3.8%	Steady
8.	Rzeszów International Airport	Rzeszów	RZE	EPRZ	645,214	▲7.3%	Steady
9.	"Solidarity" Szczecin–Goleniów Airport	Szczecin	SZZ	EPSC	412,547	▲43.7%	Steady
10.	Bydgoszcz Airport	Bydgoszcz	BZG	EPBY	289,329	▲17.9%	Steady
11.	Łódź Airport	Łódź	LCJ	EPLL	287,628	▲13.3%	Steady
12.	Lublin Airport	Lublin	LUZ	EPLB	265,111	▲41.3%	Steady
13.	Airport Zielona Góra	Zielona Góra	IEG	EPZG	17,106	▲54.8%	Steady
14.	Radom Airport^{1}	Radom	RDO	EPRA	810	---	Steady
Total					30,543,262	▲12.3%	

Notes:

^{1}: Radom Airport became operational on 29,May 2014. However, it didn't commence operation until 1,September 2015.

== See also ==
- List of airports in Poland
- List of the busiest airports in Europe
