= Wrocław Airport =

Airport in Wrocław, Poland

Nicolaus Copernicus Wrocław Airport Port Lotniczy im. Mikołaja Kopernika we Wrocławiu

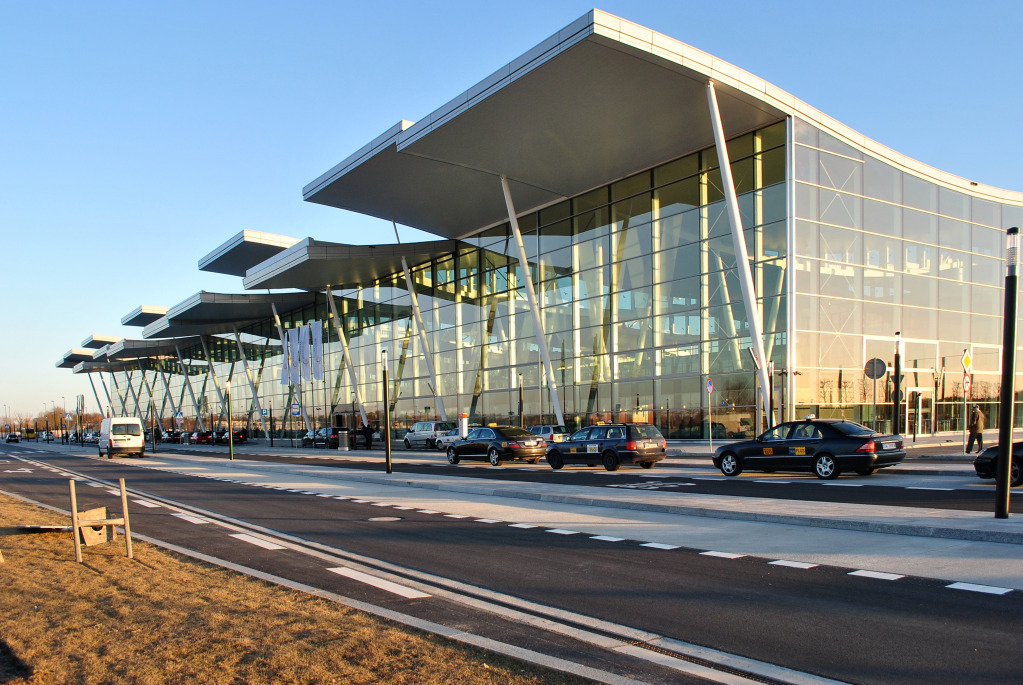
- IATA: WRO; ICAO: EPWR

Summary
- Airport type: Public
- Owner: Wrocław - 49% Lower Silesian Voivodeship - 31% Polskie Porty Lotnicze - 20%
- Operator: Wrocław Airport Company
- Serves: Wrocław, Poland
- Focus city for: Buzz; Enter Air; Ryanair; Wizz Air
- Elevation AMSL: 123 m (404 ft)
- Coordinates: 51°06′34″N 016°52′49″E
- Website: www.airport.wroclaw.pl

Map
- Location in Poland EPWR (Poland)

Runways
Direction	Length		Surface
Direction	m	ft	Surface
11/29	2,503	8,212	Concrete/Asphalt
- Source: Polish AIP at EUROCONTROL

Nicolaus Copernicus Wrocław Airport (Polish: Port lotniczy Wrocław im. Mikołaja Kopernika) (IATA: WRO, ICAO: EPWR) is an international civil-military airport in Wrocław in Lower Silesian Voivodeship in southwestern Poland. It is Poland's 5th busiest airport. In 2023, it handled over 3.8 million passengers. The airport is located ten kilometres (six miles) west of the city centre, at ul. Graniczna 190. It has one runway, one passenger terminal, one cargo terminal and one general aviation terminal. Wrocław Airport is also often used by Polish Air Force, US Air Force, NATO air force and Heavy Airlift Wing.

== History ==
=== Early years ===
The airport was built in 1938 as Flugplatz Breslau-Schöngarten Airport for German military purposes before World War II, when the city was still part of Germany. It was the site of a military aviation school, the Luftkriegsschule Breslau-Schöngarten, later renamed Luftkriegsschule 5. Among the Luftwaffe units stationed here just before the war were the Sturzkampfgeschwader 77, Kampfgeschwader 76, and Kampfgeschwader 1 "Hindenburg".

It was operated briefly by Soviet forces following the war before being used for civilian purposes in 1945. Services were operated to Warsaw, Łódź, Poznań and Katowice. By 1992 destinations also included Kraków, Rzeszów, Gdańsk, Szczecin and Koszalin.

'Port Lotniczy Wrocław S. A.' was established as a company in January 1992 and Wrocław Airport assets operated by the state-owned Polish Airports authority were transferred to the company in January 1993.

The first international flights were inaugurated in January 1993, serving Frankfurt, Germany. Significant airport improvements have been completed in the late twentieth century. A new international departures terminal was opened in May 1997 followed by a new domestic terminal in November 1998.

=== Developments since the 2000s ===
A cargo terminal, international arrivals hall, and installation of a new meteorological system were completed in 1999; new fire station and apron extensions in 2000. A new air traffic control tower and duty-free area followed in 2001.

On 6 December 2005, the airport was renamed after the famous astronomer Nicolaus Copernicus (Polish: Mikołaj Kopernik), who studied and received a scholarship in Wrocław, and was a scholaster of the Wrocław Collegiate Holy Cross and St. Bartholomew in the years 1503–1538. However, after a rebrand in 2014, the name has been dropped. Terminal extensions were officially opened on the same day, increasing the airport's capacity to 750,000 passengers per year. This capacity was quickly exceeded by several hundred thousand (in the first 9 months of 2007 the airport served 972,505 passengers) so the existing terminal space was expanded by 1,900 m^{2} (20,451 sq ft) to alleviate some of the congestion, but more importantly make the terminal facilities conform to the requirements of the Schengen Agreement, which was implemented at Poland's airports on 31 March 2008. On 19 July 2006, the architectural firm JSK was chosen to design a significant airport expansion. This includes plans for a new passenger terminal (eventually, after several stages of expansion, the airport will be able to handle 7 million passengers yearly) and assorted taxiway, apron and navigation equipment improvements (ILS). Also, car parking will be expanded to 1,000 spaces. The first stage, increasing the passenger capacity to 3.5 million yearly, officially opened on 29 February 2012. However, the new terminal opened to passengers on 11 March 2012.

In May 2014, the HEMS (Helicopter Emergency Medical Service) base was launched at the airport.

In 2015, Ryanair announced that it has selected Wrocław Airport for its aircraft maintenance base. The construction of the hangar to fit 2 C-type aircraft (Boeing 737) was finished in June 2017. The airport has upgraded to ILS system from category I to category II in April 2016.

Until it was reformed (30 June 2010), the 3rd Air Base, whose barracks complex adjoins the airport also used the main runway of the airport.

From 14 September 2020, the airport serves a regular cargo connection Wrocław - Cologne Bonn Airport carried out by ATR 72 plane by Swiftair for UPS. On 16 November – 24 December 2021, the second connection was carried out on this route, by Saab SF-340 plane by Airest.

In October 2022, Ryanair began the expansion of WAMS (Wrocław Aircraft Maintenance Services) with another hangar and two spaces for C-type aircraft (Boeing 737). The airport also announced a number of projects including new taxiways, additional apron space and deicing designated space.

In November 2023, the airport started serving its first ever intercontinental flight - a LOT Polish Airlines service to Seoul Incheon Airport, which primarily serves Wrocław's Korean diaspora.

In June 2026 Wroclaw won an award for best airport in the under 5 million passengers category at the Airports Council International Europe awards.

== Facilities ==
The airport operates modern domestic, international and cargo terminals. The international terminal contains a duty-free area in the international departures hall. The cargo terminal, located beside the airport fire station and air traffic control tower, has a storage area of 3,300 m^{2} (36,000 sq ft), a bonded warehouse, freezer and radioactive materials warehouse.

== US Armed Forces Main Operating Base ==
Due to the existence of NATO garrisons nearby (Bolesławiec, Pstrąże, Świętoszów, Żagań), in which US troops have been stationed as part of the Atlantic Resolve operation since January 2017, Wroclaw airport is very often used by US Air Force transport aircraft (inter alia Boeing C-17 Globemaster III, Lockheed C-130 Hercules, Lockheed C-5 Galaxy). On 23 September 2019, in New York, the presidents of the US and Poland signed a declaration on the deepening of defense cooperation, in which Wrocław Airport was designated as the headquarters of the US Army air transport base.

The District Infrastructure Board from Wrocław in July 2020 announced a tender for the preparation of pre-project documentation regarding the preparation of infrastructure for the aerial port of debarkation (APOD). On 25 September 2020, a contract was signed with the winner of the tender, which has until 30 June 2021 to complete the task.

== Airlines and destinations ==
The following airlines serve regular scheduled and charter services to and from Wrocław:

Airlines	Destinations
Air Dolomiti	Frankfurt
Enter Air	Charter: Antalya, Dubai–International, Hurghada, Salalah; Seasonal charter: Bodrum, Enfidha, Fuerteventura, Mombasa
KLM	Amsterdam
LOT Polish Airlines	Seoul–Incheon, Warsaw–Chopin
Lufthansa	Frankfurt, Munich
Ryanair	Agadir, Alicante, Athens, Beauvais, Bergamo, Birmingham (begins 31 March 2027), Bologna, Bournemouth, Bristol, Burgas (begins 28 March 2027), Catania (begins 30 March 2027), Dublin, East Midlands, Edinburgh, Faro (begins 30 March 2027), Gdańsk, Glasgow, Leeds/Bradford, Liverpool, London–Luton, London–Stansted, Madrid, Málaga, Malta, Manchester, Marrakesh, Marseille, Naples, Newcastle upon Tyne, Palermo, Palma de Mallorca, Paphos, Porto, Rome–Fiumicino, Sandefjord, Seville, Shannon, Sofia, Stockholm–Arlanda, Tirana, Treviso, Valencia; Seasonal: Brindisi, Chania, Charleroi, Corfu, Dubrovnik, Girona, Lamezia Terme, Lisbon, Pescara, Pisa, Podgorica, Rijeka, Rimini, Turin (begins 19 December 2026), Zadar
Scandinavian Airlines	Copenhagen
Smartwings	Charter: Marsa Alam; Seasonal charter: Antalya, Dalaman, Tirana
Swiss International Air Lines	Zürich
Transavia	Paris–Orly
Wizz Air	Barcelona, Bari, Basel/Mulhouse, Bilbao (begins 19 December 2026), Eindhoven, Chișinău, Dortmund, Kutaisi, London–Luton, Nice, Ohrid, Podgorica; Seasonal: Catania, Gran Canaria, Hurghada, Reykjavík–Keflavík, Split, Tirana, Turin (begins 17 January 2027), Varna

== Statistics ==
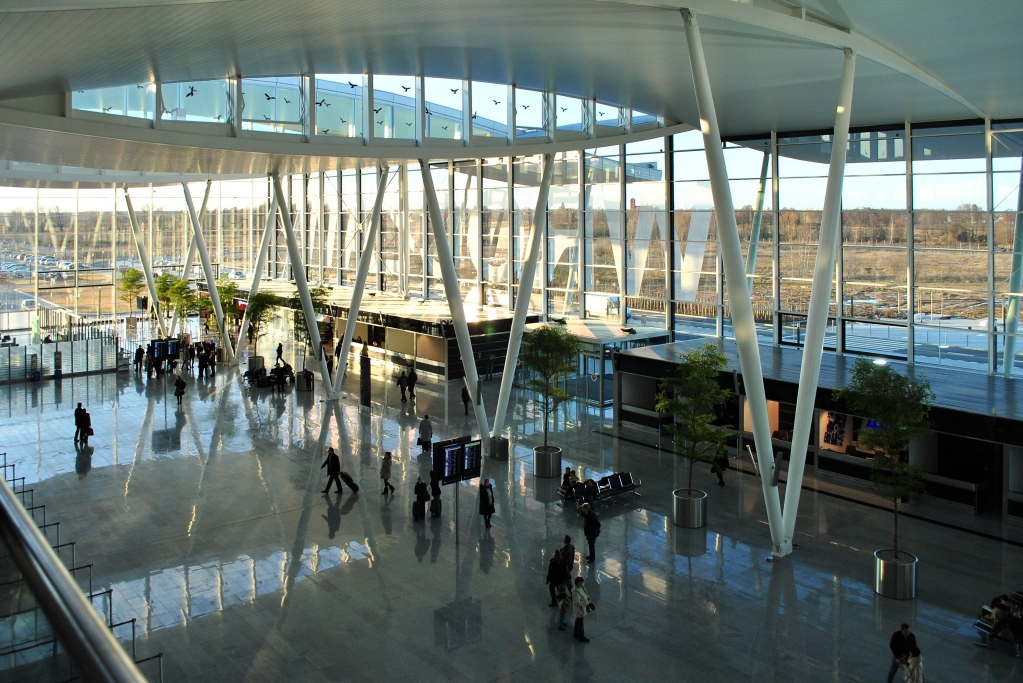
Interior of main terminal

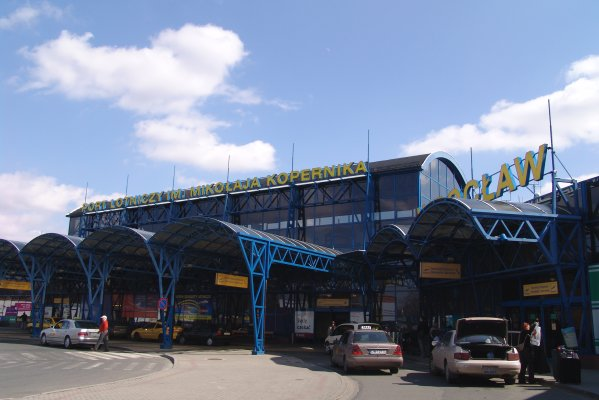
General aviation terminal

Busiest routes from Wrocław Airport (2024)
Rank	Airport	Passengers	Change 2023/24
1.	Warsaw-Chopin (WAW)	291,365	▲3,5%
2.	Antalya (AYT)	270,368	▲21,7%
3.	London-Stansted (STN)	245,295	▲15,3%
4.	Frankfurt (FRA)	176,586	▲9,6%
5.	Munich (MUC)	136,093	▲22,2%
6.	London-Luton (LTN)	131,785	▼29,0%
7.	Amsterdam (AMS)	121,673	▲118,4%
8.	Málaga (AGP)	120,572	▲144,0%
9.	Bergamo (BGY)	88,279	▲43,1%
10.	Dublin (DUB)	88,069	▲2,8%

Following are the official airport annual traffic figures.

Year	Passengers	Cargo (tonnes)	Movements	Comments
1998	174,202	871	9,558	
1999	191,502	628	10,333	
2000	210,873	2,548	11,858	
2001	237,705	1,172	7,430	
2002	236,151	1,571	6,594	
2003	284,334	1,183	12,384	
2004	355,431	823	18,509	
2005	454,047	1,378	20,556	
2006	857,931	1,510	25,002	
2007	1,270,825	1,458	26,948	
2008	1,486,442	1,462	32,000	
2009	1,365,456	1,031	25,472	
2010	1,654,439	946	23,627	2010 eruptions of Eyjafjallajökull
2011	1,657,472	957	25,339	
2012	1,996,552	928	27,960	UEFA Euro 2012 in Wrocław
2013	1,920,179	910	24,958	
2014	2,085,638	463	24,970	
2015	2,320,000	391	24,510	
2016	2,419,561	2,549	25,486	
2017	2,855,071	1,025	27,737	
2018	3,347,553	10,425	32,462	
2019	3,548,089	11,061	32 967	
2020	1,007,323	8,809	15,512	COVID-19 pandemic
2021	1,418,836	11,211	18,812	
2022	2,878,054	11,125	27,825	
2023	3,891,553	10,413	32,360	
2024	4,473,945	9,809	37,952	
2025	4,907,527		38,500	

== Ground transportation ==
=== Bus and coach ===
The airport is served by two city bus (MPK Wrocław) lines, which on their routes have many stops in the city. Line 106 (day) or 206'(night) connect to main railway station and main bus station. The journey time is 45 minutes. Line 129 through the estates Strachowice, Żerniki, Kuźniki, Gądów Mały, Popowice, Różanka, Karłowice, Poświętne with the northern part of the Psie Pole district. Line 129 also connects the airport with the nearest railway station - Wrocław Żerniki (Żernicka stop).

=== Car ===
The airport is served by traditional taxi corporations, as well as Uber, Bolt, iTaxi. The airport offers nearly 4,000 parking spaces. There are car rentals at the airport.

=== Bike ===
There is a bike path that leads to the airport.

=== Railway ===
There are plans to build a railway line between the airport and Wrocław Główny railway station. This would involve the construction of around a 2.5 km long spur from an existing railway line.

A tunnel and a railway station were designed under the main terminal, and were built at the time of its construction.

== See also ==
- SkyTaxi
- List of airports in Poland
- Lower Silesian Railways
- Transport in Poland
- Tourism in Poland
