= Kraków John Paul II International Airport =

John Paul II Kraków Balice International Airport

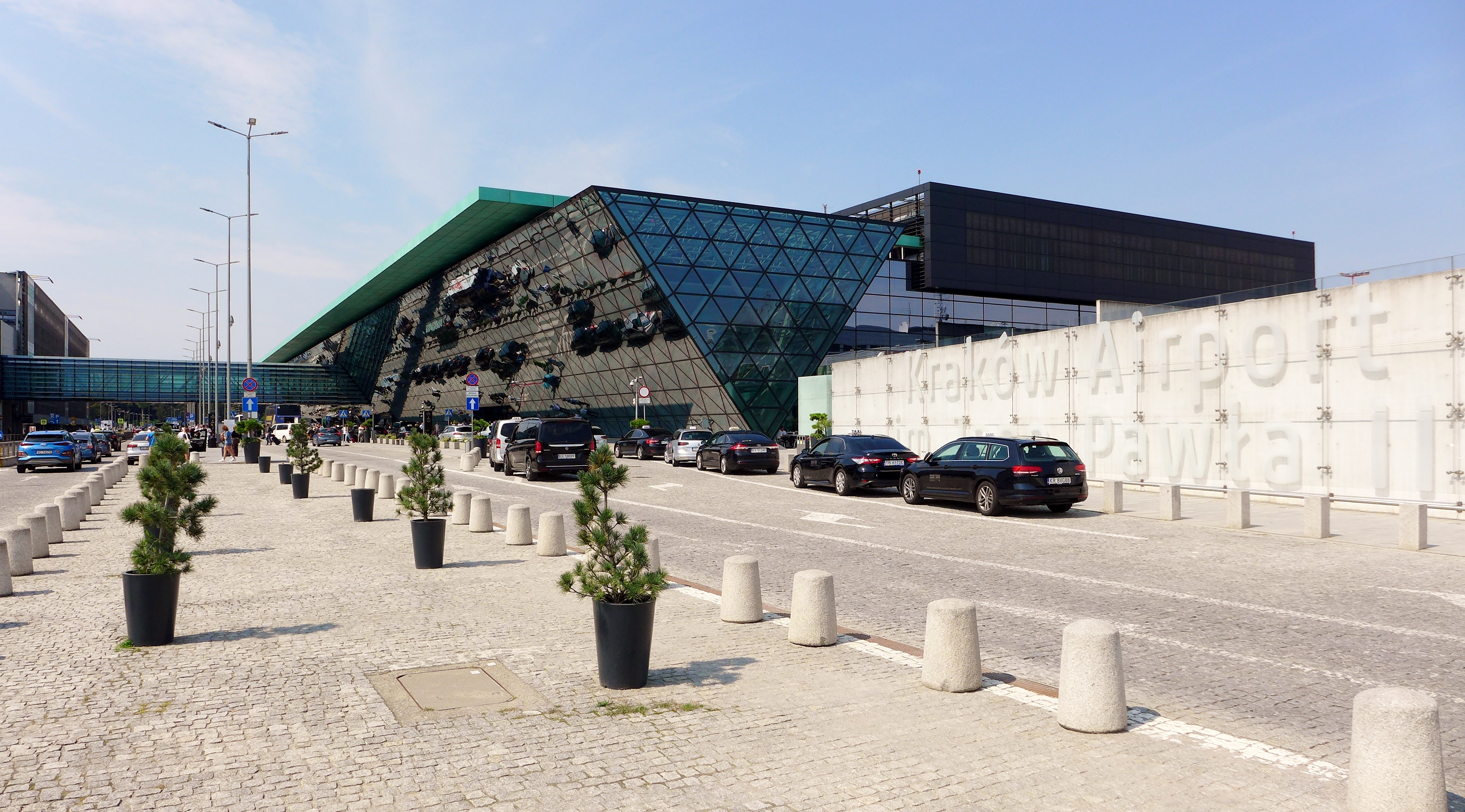
- IATA: KRK; ICAO: EPKK

Summary
- Airport type: Military/Public
- Operator: John Paul II Krakow-Balice International Airport Ltd.
- Serves: Kraków
- Location: Balice, Poland
- Focus city for: Buzz; LOT Polish Airlines; Wizz Air
- Elevation AMSL: 241 m (791 ft)
- Coordinates: 50°04′40″N 019°47′05″E
- Website: www.krakowairport.pl/en/

Map
- Location in Lesser Poland Voivodeship EPKK (Poland)

Runways
Direction	Length		Surface
Direction	m	ft	Surface
07/25	2,550	8,366	Concrete
07L/25R (emergency)	2,550	8,366	Grass

Statistics (2025)
- Passenger volume: 13,248,355 (2025)
- Aircraft movements: 71,258 (2023)

John Paul II Kraków Balice International Airport (Polish: Międzynarodowy Port Lotniczy im. Jana Pawła II Kraków-Balice) (IATA: KRK, ICAO: EPKK) is an international airport located near Kraków, in the village of Balice, 11 km (6.8 mi) west of the city centre, in southern Poland.

The airport is named after Pope John Paul II (1920–2005). It is the second-busiest airport of the country in terms of the volume of passengers served annually after Warsaw Chopin Airport. In 2024, it handled over 11 million passengers.

== History ==
=== Early years ===
Construction of the airport started in 1964. It opened for civil aviation in 1967, and was a military site until 28 February 1968. Four years later, the first passenger terminal was built there.

In the 1970s, the airport saw further development, which included an increase in the length of the runway by 400 meters, the construction of taxiways, and the installation of high intensity runway lights.

In 1988, the authorities decided to build a new terminal that was opened for public use in 1993. In 1995, the entire airport was modernized.

In 1995, the airport's name was changed from Kraków–Balice Airport to John Paul II International Airport Kraków–Balice, to honor Pope John Paul II, who was born in relatively nearby Wadowice and had spent many years of his life in Kraków, including serving as Archbishop of Kraków from 1963 until his elevation to the Papacy in 1978. For marketing reasons, the official name was further "streamlined" on 4 September 2007 as Kraków Airport im. Jana Pawła II.

=== Development since the 2000s ===
A seven-storey parking garage opposite T1 became fully operational in May 2010.

On 12 December 2012, Irish low-cost carrier Ryanair announced it would be opening its second Polish base in Kraków basing two Boeing 737-800 aircraft at the airport from 31 March 2013, which allows the carrier to increase the number of the routes from Kraków to 31.

Kraków Airport is the second busiest airport in the country after Warsaw Chopin Airport. The airport has good growth prospects, as almost 8 million people live within 100 km (62 mi) of it. The airport also has a favorable location on the network of existing and planned motorways in this region of Poland. In 2021, Ryanair announced a US$800 million investment plan into Kraków and its airport expected to bring more than 400 direct jobs for pilots, flight crews, and ground staff along with 3500 indirect jobs.

In 2023, the airport handled over 9.4 million passengers becoming the first regional airport in Poland to pass the 9 million threshold in terms of the number of passengers served annually. It collaborated with 25 traditional and low-cost airlines offering 161 flight connections to 123 airports located in 113 cities in 35 countries.

In 2024, the airport authorities announced a plan to build a new terminal for the airport due to the inadequate capacity of the terminal opened in 2016.

== Facilities ==
=== Terminal ===
Construction works of a new airport terminal began on 11 April 2013. The terminal was adjacent to the existing old terminal building. The works on the new terminal were completed in December 2016. The terminal serves all-year-round, 24 hours a day, both domestic as well as international flights. The expected maximum capacity of the terminal is up to 8 million passengers handled in a year (over twice as much as the airport served in 2012). It is also possible to handle transfer passengers irrespective of the routes (Schengen/Non-Schengen destinations). The terminal has a new luggage handling system and a roofed footbridge connecting the terminal to a hotel, a multi-level parking lot and the railway station, with direct railway link to Kraków Główny by Lesser Poland Railways.

=== Runway ===
The airport has one concrete runway, number 07/25, 2,550 m × 60 m (8,366 ft × 197 ft).

== Airlines and destinations ==
The following airlines operate regular scheduled and charter flights at Kraków Airport:

Airlines	Destinations
Aegean Airlines	Athens
airBaltic	Vilnius
Air Arabia	Sharjah
Air Dolomiti	Munich
Air France	Paris–Charles de Gaulle
Air Serbia	Belgrade
Austrian Airlines	Vienna
British Airways	London–Heathrow
Brussels Airlines	Brussels
easyJet	Amsterdam, Basel/Mulhouse, Belfast–International, Bristol, Edinburgh, Liverpool, London–Gatwick, Manchester, Newcastle upon Tyne, Paris–Charles de Gaulle; Seasonal: Birmingham, Geneva
Enter Air	Seasonal charter: Marsa Alam
Etihad Airways	Seasonal: Abu Dhabi
Eurowings	Düsseldorf; Seasonal: Stuttgart
Finnair	Helsinki
flydubai	Dubai–International
Flynas	Seasonal: Riyadh
Jazeera Airways	Seasonal: Kuwait City
Jet2.com	Birmingham, Leeds/Bradford, Manchester; Seasonal: East Midlands, London–Stansted
KLM	Amsterdam
LOT Polish Airlines	Barcelona, Chicago–O'Hare, Istanbul, Madrid, Olsztyn-Mazury, Paris–Orly, Rome-Fiumicino, Tel Aviv, Warsaw–Chopin; Seasonal: Bydgoszcz, Gdańsk, Newark
Lufthansa	Frankfurt, Munich
Luxair	Luxembourg
Norwegian Air Shuttle	Bergen, Copenhagen, Oslo, Stavanger, Stockholm–Arlanda, Trondheim
Pegasus Airlines	Ankara, İzmir
Ryanair	Aberdeen, Agadir, Alicante, Barcelona, Bari, Beauvais, Belfast–International, Bergamo, Birmingham, Bologna, Bournemouth, Bristol, Bucharest–Băneasa, Budapest,Cagliari, Catania, Charleroi, Copenhagen, Dublin, East Midlands, Edinburgh, Eindhoven, Faro, Fuerteventura, Gdańsk, Glasgow, Gothenburg, Gran Canaria, Lamezia Terme, Leeds/Bradford, Lisbon, Liverpool, London–Luton, London–Stansted, Madrid, Málaga, Malta, Manchester, Marrakech, Marseille, Memmingen, Milan–Malpensa, Naples, Newcastle upon Tyne, Olbia, Palermo, Paphos, Pescara, Pisa, Porto, Prague, Riga,, Rabat, Rome–Ciampino, Sandefjord, Seville, Shannon, Sofia, Stockholm–Arlanda, Szczecin, Tenerife–South, Thessaloniki, Tirana, Toulouse, Trieste, Valencia, Venice, Vienna; Seasonal: Amman–Queen Alia, Ancona, Athens, Burgas, Castellón, Chania, Corfu, Dubrovnik, Girona, Lourdes, Palma de Mallorca, Perugia, Podgorica, Rhodes, Rimini, Santorini, Turin, Varna, Zadar
Scandinavian Airlines	Copenhagen
Smartwings Poland	Seasonal charter: Antalya
Sundor	Tel Aviv
SunExpress	Antalya
Swiss International Air Lines	Zürich
Turkish Airlines	Istanbul
Wizz Air	Abu Dhabi, Barcelona, Basel/Mulhouse, Bergen, Bilbao, Bucharest–Băneasa, Budapest, Eindhoven, Genoa, Larnaca, London–Gatwick, London–Luton, Lyon, Málaga, Marsa Alam, Milan–Malpensa, Nice, Oslo, Rome–Fiumicino, Sofia, Stavanger, Tallinn, Tel Aviv, Valencia, Venice, Verona, Vilnius; Seasonal: Tirana

== Statistics ==
Busiest Routes from Kraków Airport (2024)
Rank	Airport	Passengers	Change 2023 / 24
1.	Frankfurt (FRA)	390,537	▲7,0%
2.	London-Stansted (STN)	352,935	▲3,5%
3.	Warsaw-Chopin (WAW)	333,917	Steady
4.	Amsterdam (AMS)	293,378	▲46,0%
5.	Oslo-Gardermoen (OSL)	289,085	▲2,0%
6.	London-Luton (LTN)	287,860	▼3,0%
7.	Munich (MUC)	263,034	▲3,7%
8.	London-Gatwick (LGW)	261,244	▲5,2%
9.	Manchester (MAN)	245,567	▲28,5%
10.	Bergamo (BGY)	242,987	▲26,0%
11.	Barcelona–El Prat (BCN)	235,599	▲38,4%
12.	Vienna (VIE)	215,686	▲1,9%
13.	Eindhoven (EIN)	212,022	▲8,8%
14.	Dublin (DUB)	208,302	▲9,1%
15.	Paris-Charles de Gaulle (CDG)	202,062	▲11,3%
16.	Copenhagen (CPH)	169,278	▲40,4%
17.	Sandefjord (TRF)	167,723	▲6,5%
18.	Antalya (AYT)	167,676	▲50,6%
19.	Rome-Ciampino	165,489	▲20,8%
20.	Edinburgh (EDI)	163,163	▲20,3%

Annual traffic
Year	Passenger Count	Percent Change
2003	593,214	
2004	841,123	▲42%
2005	1,586,130	▲89%
2006	2,367,257	▲49%
2007	3,068,199	▲30%
2008	2,923,961	▼5%
2009	2,680,322	▼8%
2010	2,863,996	▲7%
2011	3,014,060	▲5%
2012	3,439,758	▲14%
2013	3,647,616	▲6%
2014	3,817,792	▲5%
2015	4,221,171	▲11%
2016	4,983,645	▲18%
2017	5,835,189	▲17%
2018	6,769,369	▲17%
2019	8,410,817	▲24%
2020	2,592,972	▼69%
2021	3,072,074	▲18%
2022	7,394,176	▲140%
2023	9,404,611	▲27%
2024	11,080,830	▲17,8%
2025	13,248,355	▲19.6%

It was the 50th busiest airport in Europe in 2024 and had the greatest increase in passengers in all of Europe in 2019 with a 24.2% passenger increase in 2019 compared to 2018.

== Ground transportation ==
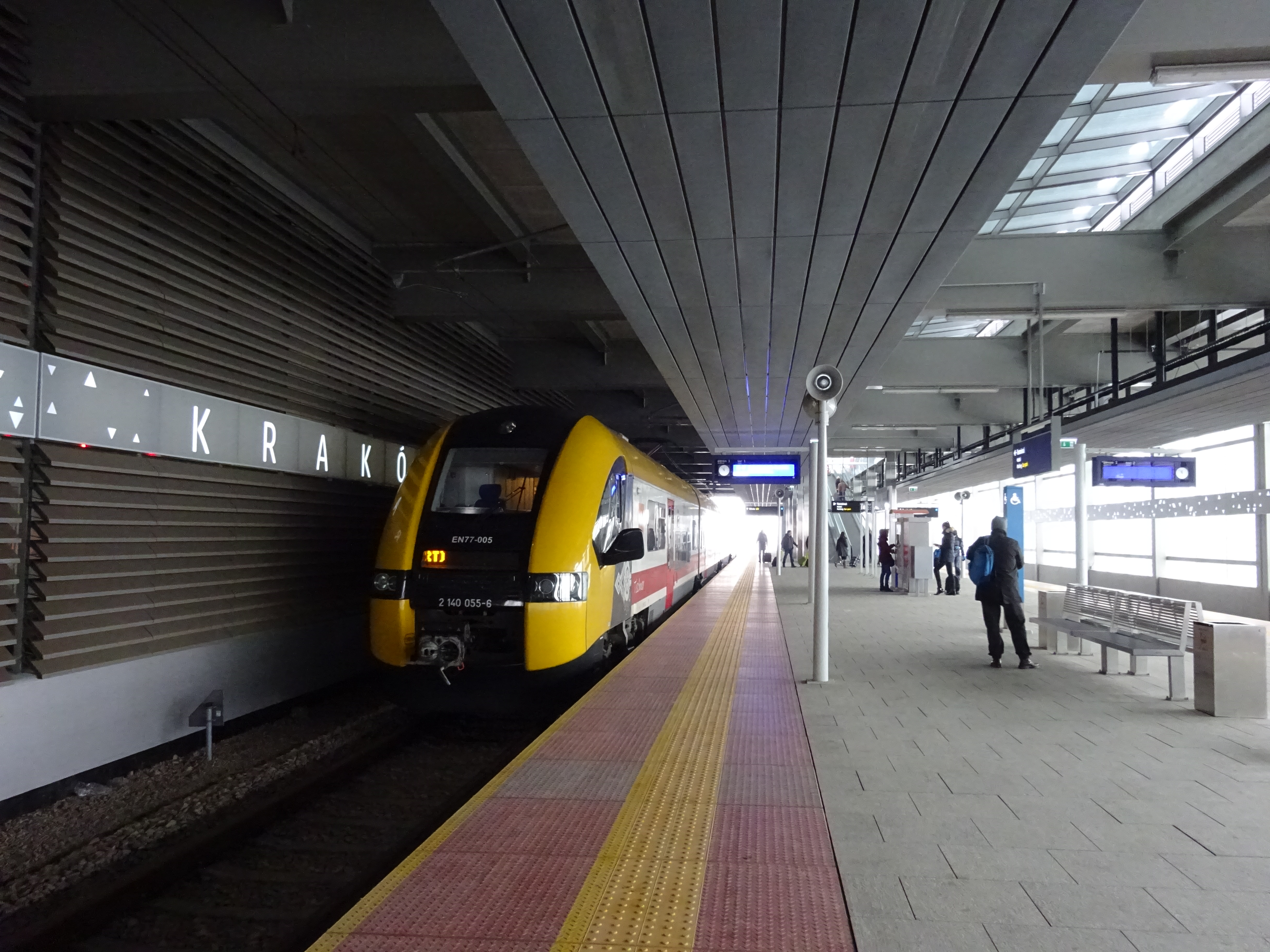
Train at "Krakow Lotnisko" station

In addition to road access by private car or taxi, other options are:

=== Train ===
The SKA1 suburban line operates from the Airport to Kraków Główny (Main railway station) and further to Wieliczka. The service resumed in September 2015. It takes about 17 minutes to get to the city centre, and further 20 minutes to Wieliczka (for Salt Mine).

Kraków Dragon trail, Dragon-Pilot in front of the terminal building

=== Bus ===
Public buses link the airport during the day and during the night with the main railway and bus station in Kraków (Kraków Główny railway station) and the ICE Congress Centre.

== Military usage ==
The aerodrome includes a military area, on its South side, which hosts the 8. Baza Lotnictwa Transportowego of the Polish Air Force, flying transport aircraft like the EADS CASA C-295.

== See also ==
- João Paulo II Airport in Azores, Portugal
- List of airports in Poland
- Air ambulances in Poland
