= Bydgoszcz Airport =

Airport serving Bydgoszcz, Poland

Ignacy Jan Paderewski Bydgoszcz Airport Port lotniczy im. Ignacego Jana Paderewskiego Bydgoszcz

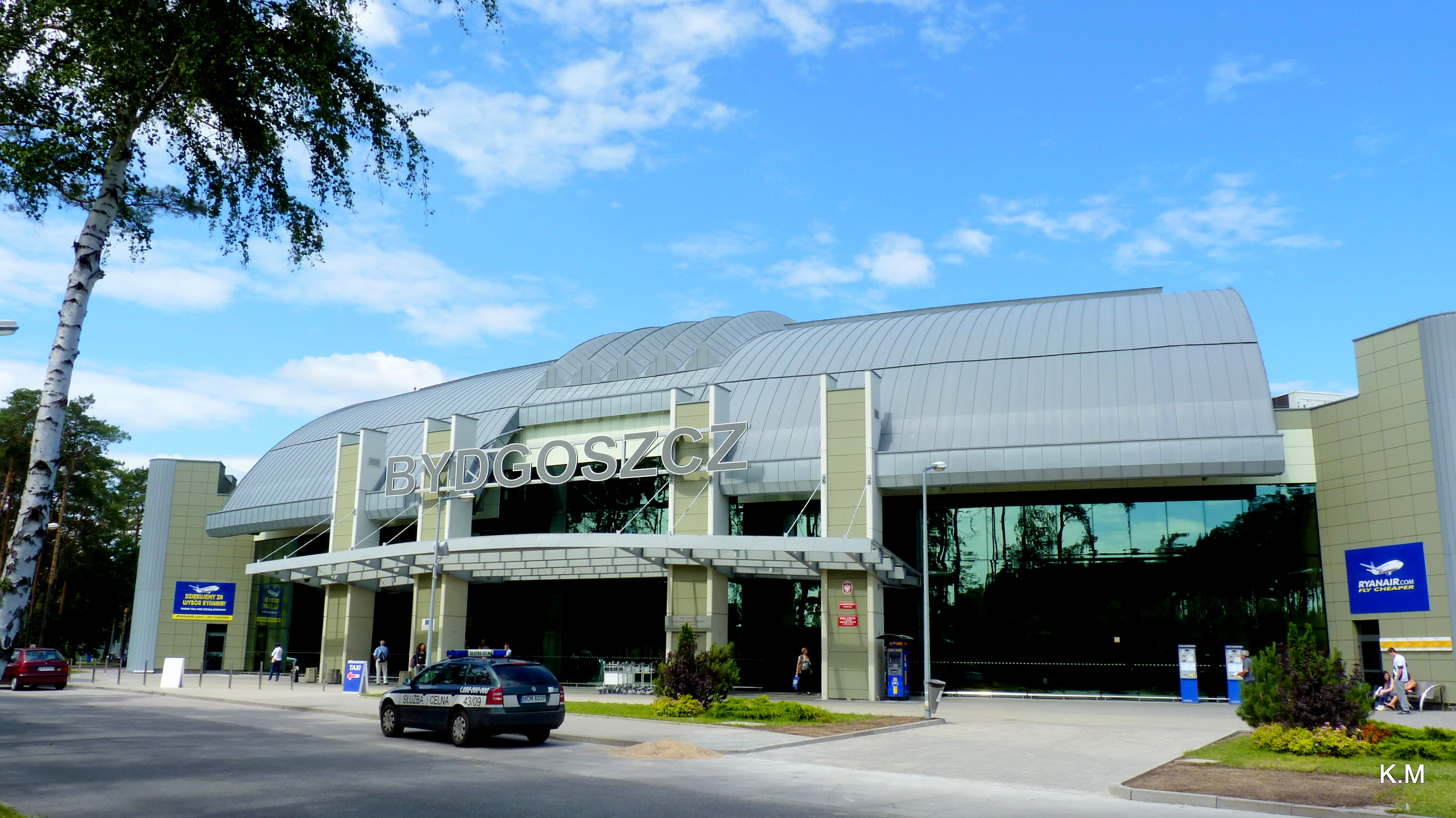
- IATA: BZG; ICAO: EPBY

Summary
- Airport type: Public / Military
- Operator: Port Lotniczy Bydgoszcz SA
- Serves: Bydgoszcz, Poland
- Elevation AMSL: 72 m / 235 ft
- Coordinates: 53°05′48″N 017°58′40″E
- Website: plb.pl

Map
- Location of airport in Poland Location of airport in Europe

Runways
| Direction | Length | | Surface |
| Direction | m | ft | Surface |
|---|---|---|---|
| 08/26 | 2,500 | 8,202 | Asphalt/Concrete |

Statistics (2022)
- Passengers: 253,361
- Polish AIP at EUROCONTROL

Ignacy Jan Paderewski Bydgoszcz Airport (Polish: Port lotniczy im. Ignacego Jana Paderewskiego Bydgoszcz) (IATA: BZG, ICAO: EPBY) is an airport serving the city of Bydgoszcz, Poland. It lies only 3.5 kilometres (2.2 miles) from the city centre and around 50 km from the city of Toruń.

It is the eleventh busiest airport in Poland in terms of passenger traffic. The airport served 413,245 passengers in 2018. It features one main passenger terminal and a single asphalt runway, measuring 2,500 metres (8,202 feet) by 60 metres (197 feet). The airport is named in honor of Polish composer and politician Ignacy Jan Paderewski.

== Airlines and destinations ==
The following airlines operate regular scheduled and charter flights at Bydgoszcz Ignacy Jan Paderewski Airport:

| Airlines | Destinations |
|---|---|
| LOT Polish Airlines | Warsaw–Chopin; Seasonal: Kraków |
| Lufthansa | Frankfurt |
| Ryanair | Alicante, Birmingham, Bristol, Dublin, London–Luton, London–Stansted |

== Statistics ==
| | Passengers | Freight (kg) | Movements |
|---|---|---|---|
| 1998 | 1,451 | 80,000 | 449 |
| 1999 | ▲5,340 | ▲120,000 | ▲1,382 |
| 2000 | ▲14,089 | - | ▼1,254 |
| 2001 | ▼6,821 | - | ▲1,969 |
| 2002 | ▲13,408 | - | ▲2,342 |
| 2003 | ▲20,064 | - | ▲3,378 |
| 2004 | ▲25,354 | 267,854 | ▼2,359 |
| 2005 | ▲38,682 | ▲338,937 | ▼1,359 |
| 2006 | ▲133,009 | ▲340,503 | ▲2,685 |
| 2007 | ▲181,576 | ▲411,052 | ▲3,092 |
| 2008 | ▲280,182 | ▲483,234 | ▲7,518 |
| 2009 | ▼275,352 | ▲520,447 | ▼6,376 |
| 2010 | ▲278,150 | ▼413,911 | ▼5,799 |
| 2011 | ▲279,536 | - | ▲7,537 |
| 2012 | ▲340,024 | - | ▼7,424 |
| 2013 | ▲343,726 | - | ▼7,299 |
| 2014 | ▼289,329 | - | ▼6,076 |
| 2015 | ▲341,079 | - | ▼5,793 |
| 2016 | ▼337,556 | - | ▲6,574 |
| 2017 | ▼331,388 | - | ▲6,809 |
| 2018 | ▲413,245 | - | ▲8,763 |
| 2019 | ▲425,230 | - | ▲11,134 |
| 2020 | ▼127,959 | - | ▼6,920 |
| 2021 | ▼99,303 | 0 | ▼6,740 |
| 2022 | ▲253,361 | ▲46,852 | ▲8,167 |
| 2023 | ▲366,037 | - | - |
Source: Bydgoszcz Airport

== See also ==
- List of airports in Poland
- Air ambulances in Poland
