= Warsaw Modlin Airport =

International airport located in Nowy Dwór Mazowiecki, Poland

Warsaw Modlin Airport Port Lotniczy Warszawa/Modlin

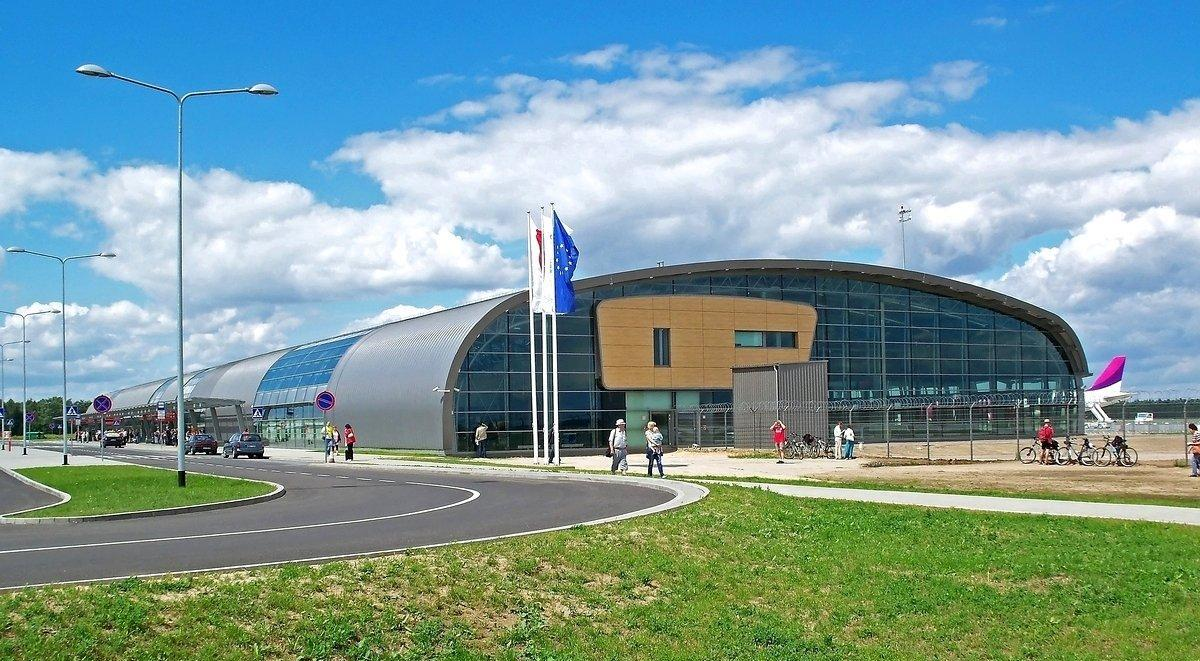
- IATA: WMI; ICAO: EPMO

Summary
- Airport type: Public
- Owner: Mazowiecki Port Lotniczy Warszawa-Modlin Sp. z o.o.
- Serves: Warsaw, Poland
- Location: Nowy Dwór Mazowiecki
- Elevation AMSL: 104 m (341 ft)
- Coordinates: 52°27′04″N 020°39′06″E
- Website: www.modlinairport.pl

Map
- Location of airport in Poland WMI (Masovian Voivodeship)

Runways
Direction	Length		Surface
Direction	m	ft	Surface
08/26	2,500	8,202	Asphalt

Statistics (2025)
- Passengers: 1,744,056
- Passenger change 24-25: ▼35.3%
- Aircraft movements (2022): 22,383
- Sources:Civil Aviation Authority of Poland

Warsaw Modlin Airport (Polish: Port lotniczy Warszawa-Modlin) (IATA: WMI, ICAO: EPMO) is an international airport located in the town of Nowy Dwór Mazowiecki, approximately forty kilometres (25 mi) north of central Warsaw, Poland. The airport is intended to be used by low-cost carriers serving Warsaw. In 2025, it was the seventh-busiest airport in Poland, serving 1,744,056 passengers annually. The city's main international airport is Warsaw Chopin Airport.

== History ==
=== Early use ===
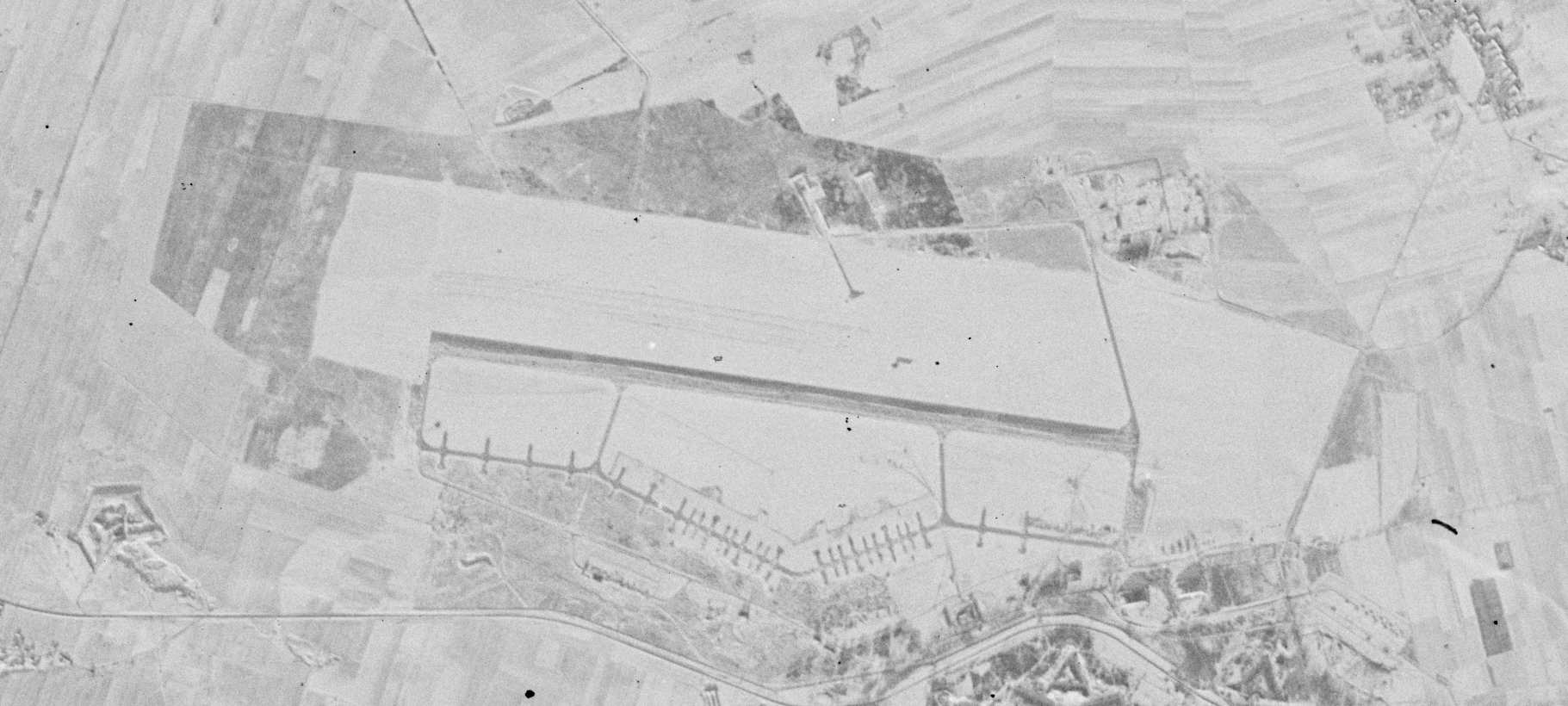
The former airbase photographed from the air in December 1961

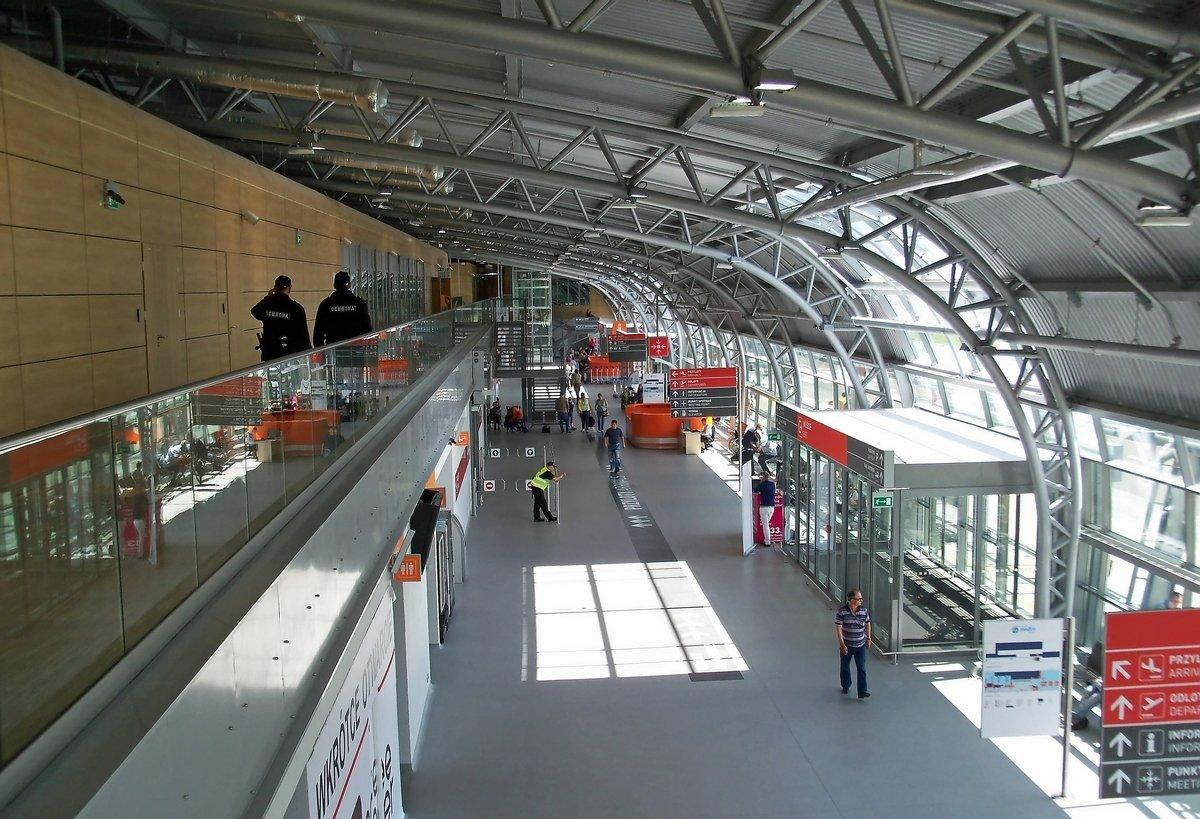
Check-in hall

Originally designed for military use in the Second Polish Republic in 1937, it was not opened by Polish authorities. Instead, it was made operational during World War II in 1940 as an airbase by the German Luftwaffe in occupied Poland.

After being seized by the 47th Artillery Regiment of the Red Army, the airport became a temporary base for the Red Army Air Force. After 1945, the Modlin airfield came under the command of the Polish Air Force. From 1976 to the 1990s, the 45th Air Experimental Squadron was based here. In 2000, the Polish Ministry of National Defence declared the airfield closed. The airport's runway was in poor condition and lacked proper lighting and modern radio navigation aids such as an Instrument Landing System.

=== Redevelopment ===
Subsequently, much of its original area was made available as capital in a joint management limited liability company created to run the future airport, Port Lotniczy Mazowsze Warszawa-Modlin Sp. z o.o. The airport was converted for civilian use, primarily as a replacement for the now closed Etiuda terminal for low-cost carriers at Warsaw's main airport, this idea emerged in the early 2000s. Numerous projected opening dates had slipped, and business plans with extensive infrastructure improvements, including a new passenger terminal, had been proposed without any actual progress in the construction for some time. An environmental assessment was completed as well. A schedule, announced in February 2008 had the airport opening for business in early 2010. On 8 February 2010, the airport was registered officially as a civil airport by the Polish Aviation Authority (Urząd Lotnictwa Cywilnego).

In September 2009, it was announced that tenders were being accepted and funding had been secured from the EU for an opening in 2011, in time for the Euro 2012 Football Tournament. Construction works began in October 2010, but the deadline was not met and the airport didn't begin operations until July 2012.

A new 5 km (3.1 mi) rail spur branching off from the existing Warsaw–Gdynia line will be built with an underground station at the airport, theoretically providing a 30-minute commute to Warsaw centre.

Although the first aircraft was meant to depart Modlin on 16 July 2012, the airport was officially inaugurated the day before, and the first passenger flight from Budapest arrived at the airport around 17:30. Low-cost-airlines Wizz Air and Ryanair started to use the airport as bases.

=== Struggle and growth ===
On 22 December 2012, it was announced that the runway at the airport would be closed to larger aircraft such as the Boeing 737 and Airbus A320 indefinitely for safety reasons. Ryanair confirmed on the day of the runway closure it would divert all aircraft to Warsaw-Chopin Airport until the runway was repaired. Wizz Air also confirmed that it would route its flights to Chopin Airport until Modlin re-opened. The official re-opening took place over six months later on 4 July 2013 after construction works to fix the runway had been completed. On 17 July 2013, Wizz Air announced it would not return to Modlin despite its re-opening, but stay at Warsaw-Chopin Airport instead. Ryanair returned to Modlin on 30 September 2013.

On 19 September 2013, the Category I Instrument Landing System was officially ready for use. At the same time tests began for the Category II Instrument Landing System which was ready for use by 1 May 2014.

In October 2015, the airport welcomed its 5-millionth passenger overall. In December of the same year, an airport lounge was inaugurated.

In April 2016, Ryanair increased the network served from Modlin to 35 destinations. On 31 October 2022, the airport began cooperation with Air Moldova, offering flights to the capital of Moldova, Chișinău.

On 1 December 2025, Wizz Air resumed operations out of Modlin with 11 new routes.

== Facilities ==
=== Terminal ===
The airport features a new, one-storey passenger terminal building containing all departures and arrivals facilities as well as some shops. The apron features stands for 10 aircraft. As there are no jet-bridges, bus and walk boarding is used.

=== Runway ===
The airport has one asphalt runway, 2,500 m (8,202 ft) long and 60 m (197 ft) wide at an elevation of 104 m (341 ft), which also features a parallel taxiway along its entire length.

== Airlines and destinations ==
The following airlines operate regular scheduled and charter flights to and from Modlin:

Airlines	Destinations
Air Arabia	Sharjah
Ryanair	Alghero, Alicante, Athens, Barcelona, Bari, Beauvais, Bergamo, Birmingham, Bologna, Budapest, Catania, Charleroi, Dublin, Edinburgh, Eindhoven, Helsinki, Glasgow, Lisbon, Liverpool, London–Stansted, Madrid, Málaga, Malmö, Malta, Milan–Malpensa, Palermo, Paphos, Porto, Rome–Ciampino, Shannon, Sofia, Stockholm–Arlanda, Tenerife–South, Tirana, Treviso, Valencia, Zagreb; Seasonal: Burgas, Chania, Copenhagen, Corfu, Dubrovnik (begins 29 March 2027), Faro, Palma de Mallorca, Rhodes, Thessaloniki, Zadar, Zakynthos
Wizz Air	Athens, Barcelona, Bergen, Brindisi, Chișinău, Malta, Palermo, Paphos, Santiago de Compostela (begins 1 December 2026); Seasonal: Alghero, Hurghada, Marsa Alam, Salerno (begins 6 June 2027), Sharm El Sheikh

== Statistics ==
Busiest Routes from Warsaw Modlin Airport (2024)
Rank	Airport	Passengers	Change 2023 / 24
1.	London-Stansted (STN)	299,691	▼17,1%
2.	Rome-Ciampino (CIA)	197,632	▲24,0%
3.	Dublin (DUB)	150,942	▼1,8%
4.	Bergamo (BGY)	116,702	▼12,2%
5.	Barcelona–El Prat (BCN)	102,476	▲4,3%
6.	Alicante (ALC)	99,226	▲9,2%
7.	Stockholm-Arlanda (ARN)	83,903	▼20,1%
8.	Beauvais (BVA)	78,586	▼22,3%
9.	Malta (MLA)	70,483	▲14,8%
10.	Eindhoven (EIN)	67,061	▼7,6%

Traffic by calendar year
Year	Passengers	Change
2012	857,481	
2013	344,476	▼59.8%
2014	1,703,219	▲394.4%
2015	2,588,175	▲52.0%
2016	2,860,874	▲11.0%
2017	2,932,639	▲2.5%
2018	3,081,966	▲5.9%
2019	3,105,576	▲0.8%
2020	872,059	▼72.0%
2021	1,455,315	▲66.9%
2022	3,126,428	▲114.8%
2023	3,400,967	▲8.8%

== Aviation services ==
Into-plane fueling services are handled by BGS.

== Ground transport ==
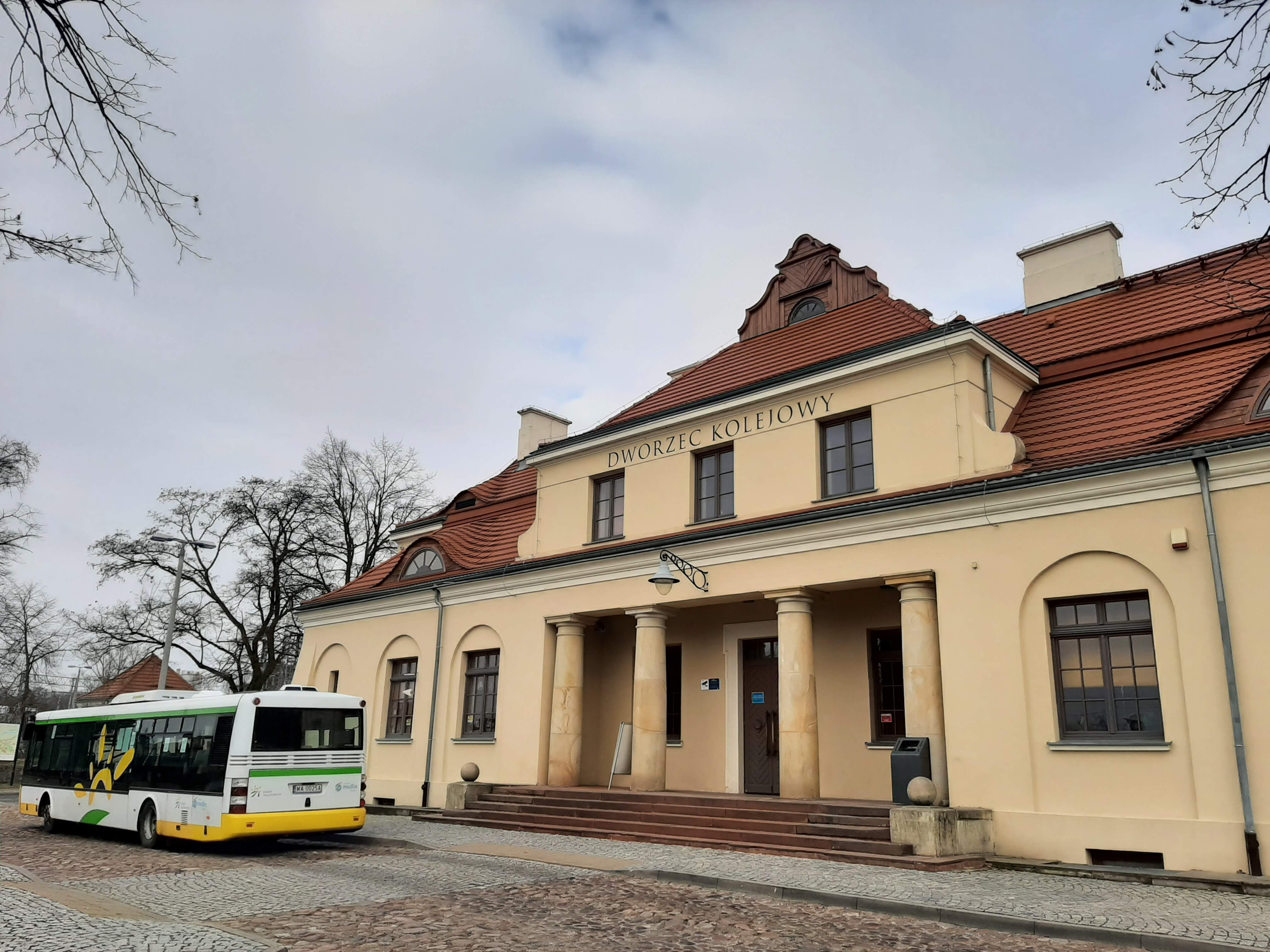
Modlin railway station with KM bus in front of it

=== Car ===
The airport is located 35 km (22 mi) north-west of Warsaw near national road 62, which is connected to expressway S7 that leads to Warsaw city center and Gdańsk.

=== Coach ===
Two coach operators, ModlinBus and OKbus, provide services from the airport to Warsaw and Łódź and the towns of Biała Podlaska, Toruń, Ciechocinek, Włocławek, and Płock several times a day.

=== Train ===
Planned route of the railway connecting the airport with Modlin railway station Planned route Current Warsaw–Gdańsk railway

The airport itself does not have a railway station, however, there are frequent shuttle bus services to the Modlin railway station (distance of 4 km (2.5 mi)), where local or long-distance trains depart to Warsaw up to 62 times a day. 21 of these services (every 60 minutes) run via Warsaw Central station to Warsaw Chopin Airport while others terminate at Warsaw West station. In the other direction, most services terminate at Modlin while some continue to Działdowo.

There is however an unelectrified, disused branch line formerly for military use branching off from Modlin railway station to Modlin Airport Parking Lot 7 (with another branch ending near the New Modlin Orthodox cemetery) that can potentially be refurbished and reactivated for passenger service. A future railway station built underneath the Modlin Airport terminal building has been in discussion since December 2009, with a potential connection to Warsaw Chopin Airport via Warsaw city centre by SKM commuter rail estimated to be established only after 2023.

On 14 October 2026, PKP Polish Railway Lines selected Skanska as the contractor for the construction of a new railway line and station to connect with the airport. The line would be a 5.5 km (3.4 mi) long double-track spur off the Warsaw–Gdańsk railway, near Modlin railway station. The new station would be located near an existing roundabout by the airport's terminal. Part of the project, a 200 m (660 ft) long platform with new track would also be constructed at Modlin. Masovian Railways plans to operate services; the project is scheduled for completion in 2029.

== See also ==
- List of airports in Poland
