= Alicante–Elche Miguel Hernández Airport =

Airport serving Alicante, Spain

Alicante–Elche Miguel Hernández Airport Aeropuerto de Alicante-Elche Miguel Hernández Aeroport d'Alacant-Elx Miguel Hernández

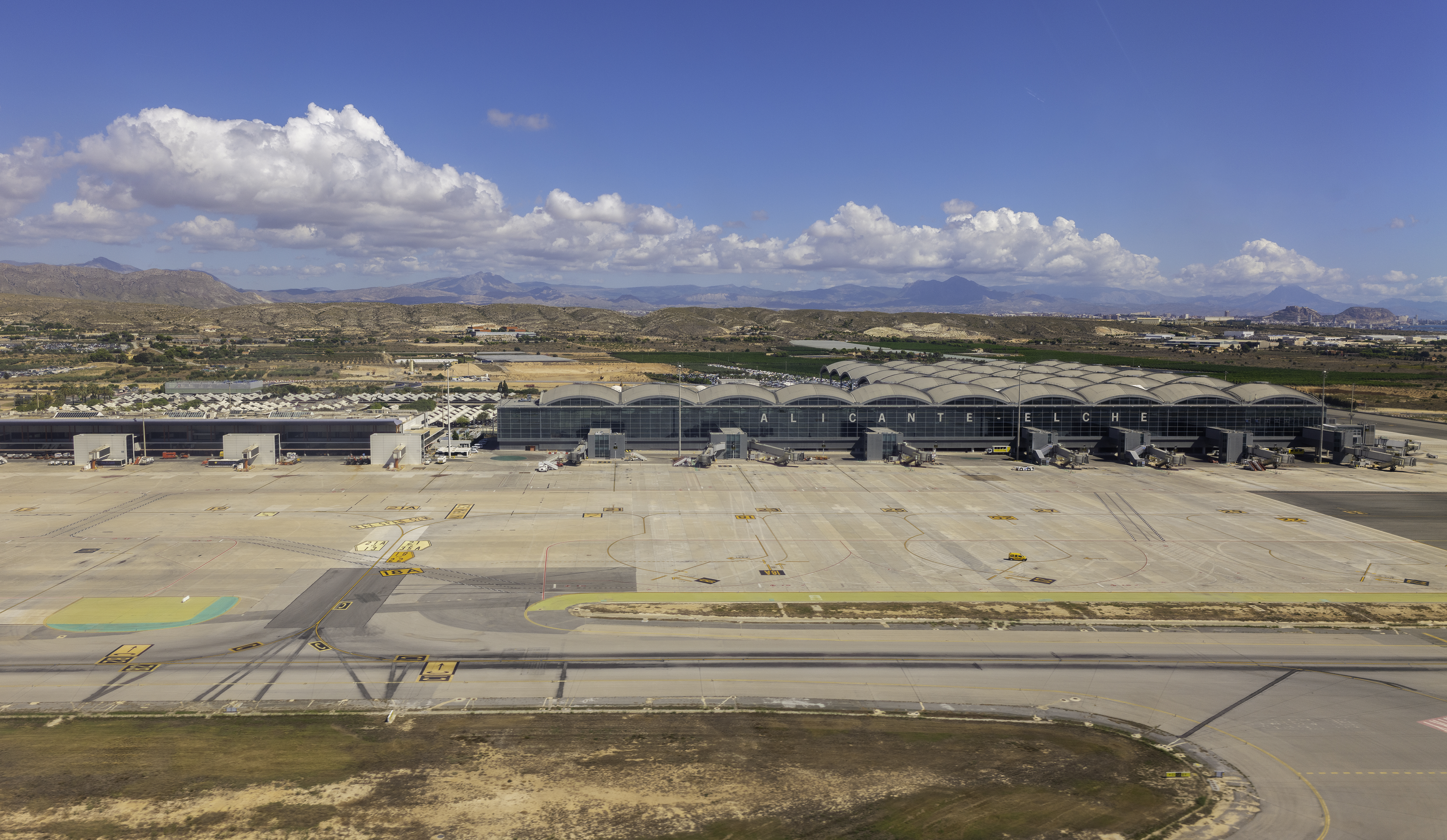
- IATA: ALC; ICAO: LEAL

Summary
- Airport type: Public
- Owner/Operator: AENA
- Serves: Alicante, Elche, Costa Blanca, Murcia and Albacete
- Location: Elche (Province of Alicante)
- Opened: 4 May 1967; 59 years ago
- Focus city for: easyJet; Norwegian Air Shuttle; Ryanair; Vueling
- Elevation AMSL: 43 m (141 ft)
- Coordinates: 38°16′56″N 00°33′29″W
- Website: www.aena.es/en/alicante-airport/index.html

Map
- Location within Spain

Runways
Direction	Length		Surface
Direction	m	ft	Surface
10/28	3,000	9,842	Asphalt / Concrete

Statistics (2025)
- Passengers: 19,950,394
- Passenger change 24-25: ▲8,5%
- Aircraft Movements: 126,081
- Movements change 24-25: ▲8,4%
- Sources: Passenger Traffic, AENA;

Alicante–Elche Miguel Hernández Airport (IATA: ALC, ICAO: LEAL) is an international airport located about nine kilometres (5 1/2 miles) southwest of the city of Alicante and about ten kilometres (six miles) east of the city of Elche in Spain. Alicante–Elche is the busiest airport in south-eastern Spain and serves both the southern part of the Valencian Community and the Region of Murcia.

The airport is a base for easyJet, Norwegian Air Shuttle, Ryanair and Vueling. Passenger traffic increased significantly in the 2010s, beating its own yearly record from 2013 to 2019. In 2024 it set a record at 18.3 million passengers. It is the largest airport in the Valencian Community (well ahead of Valencia and Castellón), 5th busiest airport in Spain and 31st busiest in Europe. Up to 80% of all passenger flights are international. The largest numbers of passengers arrive from the United Kingdom, Netherlands, Germany, Belgium, Poland, Norway and Sweden. Popular domestic destinations are Madrid, Barcelona, Palma de Mallorca, Bilbao and Santiago de Compostela.

== History ==
=== Foundation and early years ===
El Altet airport opened on 4 May 1967, replacing the older aerodrome La Rabassa that had served Alicante since 1936. It took its name after the El Altet area (a part of Elche's countryside) where it was built. The first commercial flight that landed at the airport was Convair Metropolitan by Aviaco. In November 1969, Iberia established regular connections to Madrid and Barcelona.

Historically, up until 2003, Iberia was the leading airline at the airport. With the decline of conventional airlines, low-cost EasyJet took the lead in 2004. In June 2006, Avianca commenced a weekly flight from Bogotá to Barcelona whose outbound leg included a stop in Alicante. This was the city's first transatlantic service. Avianca flew the route with a Boeing 767. In 2008, the airline ended service to Alicante after Spanish authorities granted it permission to operate the flight nonstop in both directions.

In November 2007, Ryanair, the largest European low-cost airline, established a base at Alicante. It has since grown to become one of the leading carriers at the airport, and by 2011 it had increased its presence further with eleven based aircraft, 62 routes, and had carried more than 3 million passengers.

=== Development since 2010 ===
In March 2011, Alicante-Elche's current terminal opened, which replaced the previous 2 terminals.

The airport is located within Elche's comarca and so there had been a historical petition from Elche to include the city's name in the official name of the airport. On 12 July 2013, the name of the airport was officially changed from Aeropuerto de Alicante to Aeropuerto de Alicante–Elche with the IATA airport code (ALC) remaining unchanged.

In 2015, the number of passengers increased by 5,1% to 10,574,484. The passenger traffic has increased in every year since 2000, with the exception of 2009, 2012 and 2020. By 2015 the largest number of passengers was carried by Ryanair (2,992,984), followed by EasyJet (1,285,221) and Vueling (1,093,494). Norwegian Air Shuttle (893,319) is the distant fourth.

On 23 July 2016, the airport registered its busiest day of operations to date, handling 347 flights—with an average of one flight every 3 minutes—and about 58,000 passengers in a single day.

In 2020, the airport recorded more than 11 million less passengers due to the COVID-19 pandemic.

In 2021, the airport was renamed again to Aeropuerto de Alicante–Elche Miguel Hernández, to mark the 110th anniversary of the birth of Spanish poet and playwright Miguel Hernández.

In 2024, it reached 18.38 million passengers, representing an increase of 16.8% compared to 2023. Ryanair currently has eighteen planes based at the airport as of summer 2025.

== Terminals ==
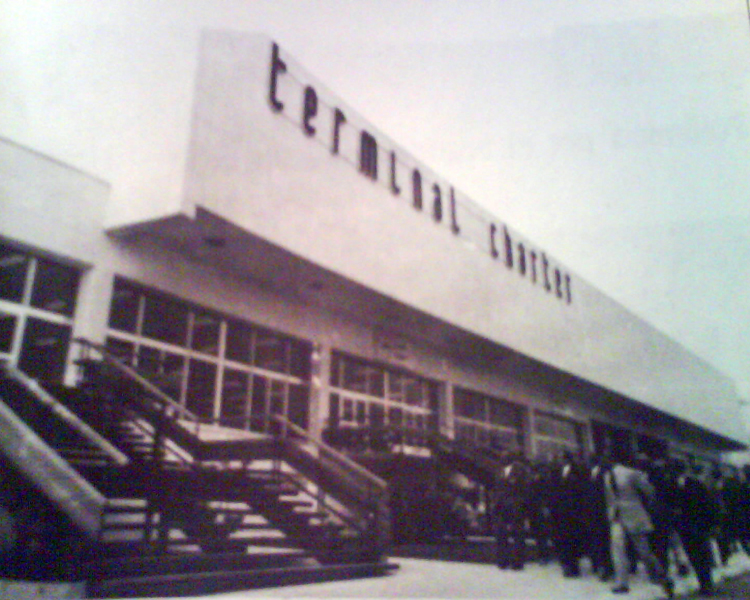
Alicante Airport in 1972

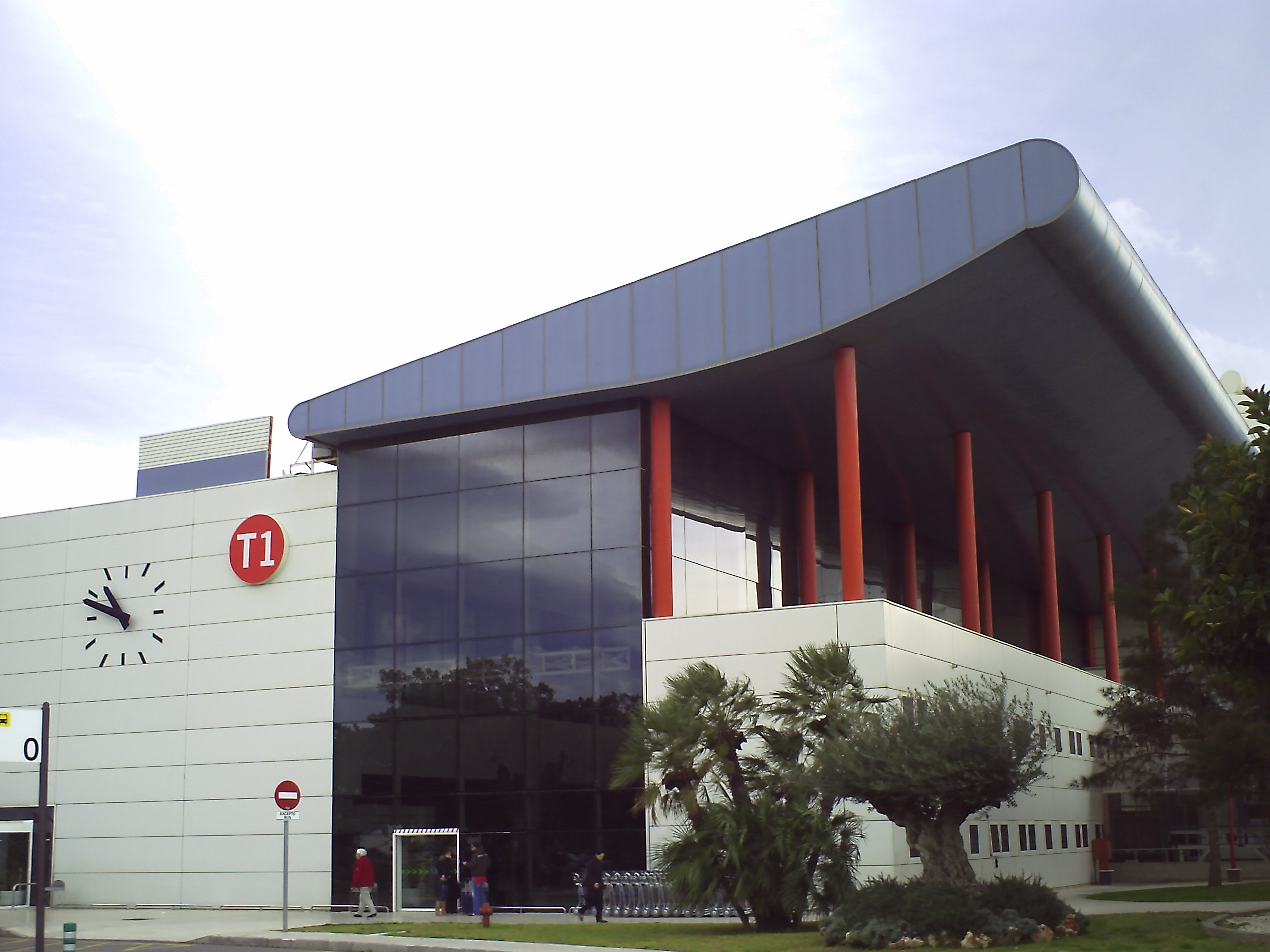
The former Terminal 1 prior to its closure in 2011

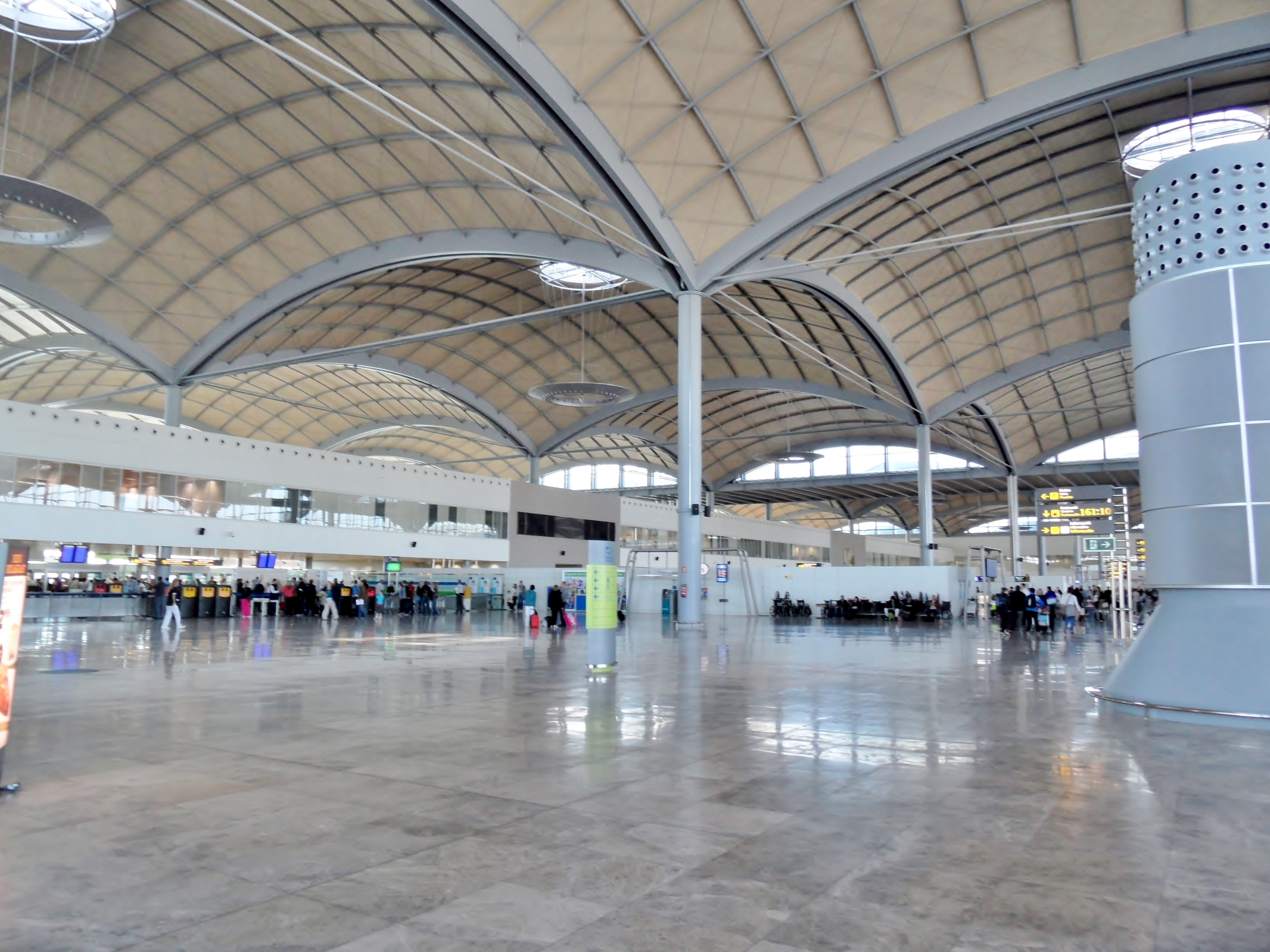
Interior of Terminal N

=== Terminal NAT ===
Terminal NAT is the only terminal currently in public use. In November 2004, the airport's operator Aena approved plans to construct a new terminal for ALC, as a response to the airport's continuous passenger growth. Construction began in 2005, with an initial planned completion of 2009/10. After more than 5 years of construction, Terminal NAT (Nueva Área Terminal) officially opened on 23 March 2011. All flight operations were transferred to this terminal on the following day. The first flight to depart from Terminal NAT was a Ryanair flight to Memmingen. The terminal has an area of 333,500 square metres (3,590,000 sq ft), more than six times the size of the previous 2 terminals and has a capacity of 20 million passengers a year. Terminal N was constructed to the east of terminals 1 and 2 and includes 96 check-in desks, 40 gates, including 15 with airbridges, and 16 baggage claim carousels. The terminal is split into two areas, the processor where the C Gates are held, and the dock where the majority of B Gates are located. Flights within the Schengen Area use both areas of the terminal while flights to non-Schengen destinations only use the dock.

In October 2011, Ryanair terminated 31 routes after airport operator Aena demanded that Ryanair pay over €2 million a year for the use of Terminal N's air bridges, a facility that Ryanair had called "unnecessary" as the airline prefers to use mobile stairways for boarding and disembarking. However, Ryanair have since re-increased their number of routes from the airport.

On 16 September 2026, plans were approved to expand the terminal with a new boarding area for non-schengen flights, increasing the current terminal's area by nearly 30%. The work will cost €868 million and work is expected to be completed in 2031.

=== Former terminals ===
By 1970, the airport was handling close to 1 million passengers, which prompted the construction of a new passenger terminal, the first phase opening in 1972 for international flights and the second phase opening in 1975 for domestic flights. In 1978, passenger numbers exceeded 2 million. In 1980, the runway was extended to 3 kilometres (1.9 mi).

During the 1990s, the terminals were modernised and expanded in order to accommodate the airport's rising passenger numbers. A new control tower and office building, together with operation and business centres, were constructed and five air bridges were installed to facilitate boarding. Car parking capacity was increased, the aircraft apron was expanded and a new runway exit was also constructed.

While construction on Terminal NAT was underway, Aena approved plans for an extension to the existing terminal, which would act as an auxiliary until the new terminal was complete. The adjacent extension opened in January 2007 and was named Terminal 2 (T2) and the existing terminal was renamed Terminal 1 (T1).

Terminals 1 and 2 have remained closed since 2011. After speculation that they would later reopen, it has now been confirmed that both terminals will be demolished as part of the further expansion to the airport's current terminal, with demolition commencing sometime between 2027 and 2031. Terminal 1 (T1) had 39 check-in desks, 11 departure gates (5 with airbridges) and 9 baggage claim carousels, while terminal 2 (T2) had 14 check-in desks, 6 gates (none with airbridges), and 2 baggage claim carousels.

== Airlines and destinations ==
The following airlines operate regular scheduled and charter flights at Alicante–Elche Airport:

Airlines	Destinations
Aer Lingus	Dublin
Air Algérie	Algiers, Oran
Air Europa	Madrid, Palma de Mallorca
Air Serbia	Belgrade
airBaltic	Riga
Austrian Airlines	Seasonal: Vienna
British Airways	London–Gatwick
Brussels Airlines	Brussels
easyJet	Basel/Mulhouse, Belfast–International, Birmingham, Bristol, Edinburgh, Geneva, Glasgow, Liverpool, London–Gatwick, London–Luton, London–Southend, Lyon, Manchester, Naples, Newcastle upon Tyne, Southampton; Seasonal: Amsterdam, Athens, Lille, Lyon, Nantes, Prague
Eurowings	Düsseldorf, Hannover, Prague; Seasonal: Cologne/Bonn, Hamburg, Stuttgart
Finnair	Helsinki
FlyOne	Chișinău, Yerevan
Iberia	Ibiza, Madrid
Icelandair	Reykjavík–Keflavík
ITA Airways	Seasonal: Rome–Fiumicino
Jet2.com	Belfast–International, Birmingham, Bristol, East Midlands, Edinburgh, Glasgow, Leeds Bradford, Liverpool, London–Stansted, Manchester, Newcastle upon Tyne; Seasonal: Bournemouth, London–Gatwick, London–Luton
KLM	Amsterdam
Lufthansa	Frankfurt
Lufthansa City Airlines	Munich
Luxair	Luxembourg
Neos	Reykjavík–Keflavík
Norwegian Air Shuttle	Ålesund, Bergen, Billund, Copenhagen, Gothenburg, Haugesund, Helsinki, Oslo, Sandefjord, Stavanger, Stockholm–Arlanda, Stockholm-Skavsta, Trondheim; Seasonal: Aalborg, Aarhus, Munich, Riga, Växjö
Pegasus Airlines	Istanbul–Sabiha Gökçen
Royal Air Maroc	Casablanca
Ryanair	Beauvais, Bergamo, Berlin, Birmingham, Bournemouth, Bratislava, Bremen (ends 26 March 2027), Bristol, Bydgoszcz, Cardiff, Catania, Charleroi, Cologne/Bonn, Copenhagen, Dublin, East Midlands, Edinburgh, Eindhoven, Exeter, Gdańsk, Glasgow, Glasgow–Prestwick, Gothenburg, Hamburg, Helsinki, Ibiza, Karlsruhe/Baden-Baden, Katowice, Kaunas, Kraków, Leeds/Bradford, Liverpool, Łódź, London–Gatwick, London–Luton, Manchester, Marrakech, Marseille, Memmingen, Münster/Osnabrück, Newcastle upon Tyne, Newquay, Norwich, Pardubice, Poznań, Rzeszów, Sandefjord, Seville, Shannon, Sofia, Stockholm–Arlanda, Stockholm–Västerås, Teesside, Tétouan, Toulouse, Växjö, Venice, Vienna, Vitoria, Warsaw–Chopin, Warsaw–Modlin, Weeze, Wrocław; Seasonal: Bari, Friedrichshafen, Kerry, Knock, Menorca, Palma de Mallorca, Saarbrücken, Santiago de Compostela
Scandinavian Airlines	Seasonal: Stavanger
SkyUp Airlines	Chișinău
Swiss International Air Lines	Zurich
Transavia	Amsterdam, Brussels, Eindhoven, Paris–Orly, Rotterdam
TUI Airways	Birmingham, Cardiff, East Midlands, Glasgow, London–Gatwick, Manchester, Newcastle upon Tyne
TUI fly Belgium	Antwerp, Brussels, Ostend/Bruges
Volotea	Asturias, Bilbao; Seasonal: Bordeaux, Luxembourg, Lyon, Nantes
Vueling	Amsterdam, Algiers, Barcelona, Bilbao, Brussels, Cardiff, Gran Canaria, London–Gatwick, Oran, Palma de Mallorca, Paris–Orly, Santiago de Compostela, Tenerife–North
Wizz Air	Belgrade, Bratislava, Bucharest–Otopeni, Budapest, Catania (begins 15 December 2026), Cluj-Napoca, Gdańsk, Katowice, London–Luton, Milan–Malpensa, Rome–Fiumicino, Târgu Mureș (begins 14 January 2027), Venice, Warsaw–Chopin

== Statistics ==
=== Annual traffic ===
Traffic by calendar year
	Passengers	Aircraft movements	Cargo (tonnes)
2000	6,038,266	56,427	7,745
2001	6,542,121	56,550	7,923
2002	7,010,322	59,268	6,548
2003	8,195,454	66,571	5,848
2004	8,571,144	71,387	6,036
2005	8,795,705	76,109	5,193
2006	8,893,720	76,813	4,931
2007	9,120,631	79,756	4,533
2008	9,578,304	81,097	5,982
2009	9,139,607	74,281	3,199
2010	9,382,935	74,474	3,112
2011	9,913,764	75,572	3,011
2012	8,855,764	62,468	2,527
2013	9,638,835	68,305	2,589
2014	10,066,067	71,571	2,637
2015	10,575,288	74,086	3,587
2016	12,344,945	87,113	5,461
2017	13,706,513	89,527	5,040
2018	13,981,320	96,734	4,013
2019	15,047,840	101,408	4,032
2020	3,739,499	37,153	3,519
2021	5,841,181	51,505	3,984
2022	13,202,880	90,109	4,641
2023	15,747,699	100,547	4,461
2024	18,387,387	116,270	4,247
2025	19,950,394	126,081	4,129
Source: Aena Statistics

=== Busiest routes ===
Busiest European routes from ALC (2023)
Rank	Destination	Passengers	Change 2021/22
1	Manchester	848,435	▲17%
2	London-Gatwick	737,258	▲27%
3	Amsterdam	519,059	▲18%
4	Brussels	473,431	▲7%
5	Bristol	463,596	▲29%
6	London-Stansted	449,485	▲21%
7	Oslo-Gardermoen	393,376	▼4%
8	Stockholm-Arlanda	382,082	▲8%
9	East Midlands	360,472	▲15%
10	Birmingham	346,054	▲4%
11	Eindhoven	331,246	▲9%
12	Leeds-Bradford	326,746	▲19%
13	Dublin	312,866	▲17%
14	London-Luton	305,893	▲26%
15	Newcastle	273,402	▲13%
16	Copenhagen	260,288	▲9%
17	Glasgow	257,504	▲9%
18	Liverpool	247,590	▲28%
19	Edinburgh	243,513	▲15%
20	Charleroi	228,210	0%
Source: Estadísticas de tráfico aereo

Busiest intercontinental routes from ALC (2023)
Rank	Destination	Passengers	Change 2022/23
1	Marrakech	57,309	▲96%
2	Tétouan	42,085	▲68%
3	Fez	28,399	▲901%
4	Oran	12,748	▲191%
5	Algiers	6,746	▲121%
Source: Estadísticas de tráfico aereo

Busiest domestic routes from ALC (2023)
Rank	Destination	Passengers	Change 2021/22
1	Palma de Mallorca	458,675	▲18%
2	Barcelona	431,736	▲18%
3	Madrid	325,081	▲16%
4	Santiago de Compostela	207,604	▲22%
5	Bilbao	190,438	▲1%
6	Ibiza	139,705	▲20%
7	Asturias	106,551	0%
8	Tenerife-North	103,451	0%
9	Seville	58,361	▲6%
10	Vitoria	57,358	▲80%
11	Gran Canaria	41,310	▼10%
12	Lanzarote	33,912	▼23%
13	Menorca	27,301	▼36%
14	Santander	18,965	▲165%
15	Vigo	1,859	▲29%
Source: Estadísticas de tráfico aereo

== Ground transport ==
Alicante airport is accessible by buses, taxis, and private cars on automobile road N-338. New car parking was opened in 2011 together with the new terminal. It employs a modern sensor system with displays and is directly connected with the airport building.

=== Bus ===
All bus stops in Alicante airport are located on the departures roadway.

- Bus line "C6" connects Alicante city center and passes through Alicante Bus Station, Port of Alicante and Alicante Railway Station. The bus route is available 24/7 and runs every 15 minutes from 6:00 to 23:00 and every 60 minutes from 23:00 to 6:00
- Bus line “R11" connects Elche city center with stops in Torrellano and Elche Industrial Park.
- Bus line “R10" connects Elche city center with stops in Playa El Altet and Arenales del Sol.

There are also hourly bus services to Benidorm, Torrevieja, Santa Pola, Guardamar del Segura and Murcia.

=== Taxi ===
Official taxi service is provided at the airport. Taxi boarding area is located on the right side of arrivals roadway. All vehicles are white colored and can be identified by a green stripe running the length of the vehicle.

=== Ride-hailing ===
Since 2024, ride-hailing companies Uber and Cabify have operated exclusive pickup areas at the airport located on the left side of arrivals roadway.

=== Rail link extension ===
The new terminal of the airport was built with space allocated for a railway station and an Alicante Tram stop. In 2019, the Generalitat Valenciana granted €50,000 towards a feasibility study in connecting Alicante Airport to the rail network. The same year, the Ministry of Development put out to tender the contract to build the airport rail link to form part of the Cercanías Murcia/Alicante commuter rail network.

== Accidents and incidents ==
- In September 2013, a baby died at the airport shortly after arriving with relatives on a flight from London after the child's mother placed the baby in a carrier onto a conveyor belt used for bulky luggage items. The belt activated due to having detected the carrier's weight, and the baby became tangled in the machine's rollers.
- On 10 April 2017, a Jet2 Boeing 757-200 suffered a tailstrike during landing, damaging the area around the lower tail. The Spanish Civil Aviation Accident and Incident Investigation Commission determined the copilot, who was flying, left the nose too high during the landing and the captain failed to intervene. The copilot, who was on his final day of training after working for Jet2 for two years, reported to investigators that he felt stressed due to pressure from Jet2 and had been sleeping poorly. Jet2 fired the copilot following the accident.
- In January 2020, a fire in the international terminal's roof caused a 24-hour closure of the airport, with the diversion of 160 flights.

== See also ==
- Transport in Spain
- ENAIRE
