= List of airports by IATA code: O =

IATA	ICAO	Airport name	Location served	Time	DST
-OA-
OAA	OASH	Forward Operating Base Shank	Gardez, Afghanistan		
OAG	YORG	Orange Airport	Orange, New South Wales, Australia		
OAH	OASD	Shindand Air Base	Shindand, Afghanistan		
OAI	OAIX	Bagram Airfield	Bagram, Afghanistan		
OAJ	KOAJ	Albert J. Ellis Airport	Jacksonville, North Carolina, United States		
OAK	KOAK	Oakland International Airport	Oakland, California, United States		
OAL	SSKW	Capital do Café Airport	Cacoal, Rondônia, Brazil		
OAM	NZOU	Oamaru Airport	Oamaru, New Zealand		
OAN	MHEA	El Arrayán Airport	Olanchito, Honduras		
OAR	KOAR	Marina Municipal Airport	Monterey / Marina, California, United States		
OAS	OASA	Sharana Airstrip / Forward Operating Base Sharana	Sharana, Afghanistan		
OAX	MMOX	Xoxocotlán International Airport	Oaxaca de Juárez, Oaxaca, Mexico		
OAZ	OAZI	Camp Bastion Air Base	Girishk (Gereshk), Afghanistan		
-OB-
OBA		Oban Airport	Oban, Queensland, Australia		
OBC	HDOB	Obock Airport	Obock, Djibouti		
OBD		Obano Airport	Obano, Indonesia		
OBE	KOBE	Okeechobee County Airport	Okeechobee, Florida, United States		
OBF	EDMO	Oberpfaffenhofen Airport	Oberpfaffenhofen, Bavaria, Germany	UTC+02:00	Mar-Oct
OBI	SBTI	Óbidos Airport	Óbidos, Pará, Brazil		
OBL	EBZR	Oostmalle Airfield	Zoersel, Belgium		
OBM		Morobe Airport	Morobe, Papua New Guinea		
OBN	EGEO	Oban Airport (North Connel Airport)	Oban, Scotland, United Kingdom	UTC+01:00	Mar-Oct
OBO	RJCB	Tokachi–Obihiro Airport	Obihiro, Hokkaido, Japan	UTC+09:00	
OBS	LFHO	Aubenas Aerodrome (Ardèche Méridionale Aerodrome)	Aubenas, Rhône-Alpes, France	UTC+02:00	Mar-Oct
OBU	PAOB	Kobuk Airport	Kobuk, Alaska, United States		
OBX	AYOB	Obo Airport	Obo, Papua New Guinea		
-OC-
OCA		Ocean Reef Club Airport (FAA: 07FA)	Key Largo, Florida, United States		
OCC	SECO	Francisco de Orellana Airport	Puerto Francisco de Orellana (Coca), Ecuador		
OCE	KOXB	Ocean City Municipal Airport	Ocean City, Maryland, United States		
OCF	KOCF	Ocala International Airport (Jim Taylor Field)	Ocala, Florida, United States		
OCH	KOCH	A.L. Mangham Jr. Regional Airport	Nacogdoches, Texas, United States		
OCJ	MKBS	Ian Fleming International Airport	Ocho Rios, Jamaica		
OCM	YBGD	Boolgeeda Airport	Boolgeeda, Western Australia, Australia		
OCN	KOKB	Oceanside Municipal Airport (FAA: OKB)	Oceanside, California, United States		
OCS		Corisco International Airport	Corisco Island, Equatorial Guinea		
OCV	SKOC	Aguas Claras Airport	Ocaña, Colombia		
OCW	KOCW	Washington–Warren Airport (Warren Field)	Washington, North Carolina, United States		
-OD-
ODA	FEFW	Ouadda Airport	Ouadda, Central African Republic		
ODB	LEBA	Córdoba Airport	Córdoba, Andalusia, Spain	UTC+02:00	Mar-Oct
ODC		Oakdale Airport (FAA: O27)	Oakdale, California, United States		
ODD	YOOD	Oodnadatta Airport	Oodnadatta, South Australia, Australia		
ODE	EKOD	Hans Christian Andersen Airport	Odense, Denmark		
ODH	EGVO	RAF Odiham	Odiham, England, United Kingdom	UTC+01:00	Mar-Oct
ODJ	FEGO	Ouanda Djallé Airport	Ouanda Djallé, Central African Republic		
ODL		Cordillo Downs Airport	Cordillo Downs, South Australia, Australia		
ODM		Garrett County Airport (FAA: 2G4)	Oakland, Maryland, United States		
ODN	WBGI	Long Seridan Airport	Long Seridan, Sarawak, Malaysia		
ODO	UIKB	Bodaybo Airport	Bodaybo, Irkutsk Oblast, Russia		
ODR	YORV	Ord River Airport	Ord River, Western Australia, Australia		
ODS	UKOO	Odesa International Airport	Odesa, Ukraine		
ODW	KOKH	A.J. Eisenberg Airport (FAA: OKH)	Oak Harbor, Washington, United States		
ODY	VLOS	Oudomsay Airport	Muang Xay (Oudomxai), Laos		
-OE-
OEC	WPOC	Oecusse Airport	Oecussi, East Timor		
OEL	UUOR	Oryol Yuzhny Airport	Oryol (Orel), Oryol Oblast, Russia		
OEM	SMPA	Vincent Fayks Airport	Paloemeu, Suriname		
OEO	KOEO	L.O. Simenstad Municipal Airport	Osceola, Wisconsin, United States		
OER	ESNO	Örnsköldsvik Airport	Örnsköldsvik, Sweden		
OES	SAVN	Antoine de Saint Exupéry Airport	San Antonio Oeste, Río Negro, Argentina		
-OF-
OFF	KOFF	Offutt Air Force Base	Omaha, Nebraska, United States		
OFI	DIOF	Ouango Fitini Airport	Ouango Fitini, Ivory Coast		
OFJ	BIOF	Ólafsfjörður Airport	Ólafsfjörður, Iceland		
OFK	KOFK	Norfolk Regional Airport (Karl Stefan Memorial Field)	Norfolk, Nebraska, United States		
OFU	NSAS	Ofu Airport (FAA: Z08)	Ofu Island, American Samoa		
-OG-
OGA	KOGA	Searle Field	Ogallala, Nebraska, United States		
OGB	KOGB	Orangeburg Municipal Airport	Orangeburg, South Carolina, United States		
OGD	KOGD	Ogden-Hinckley Airport	Ogden, Utah, United States		
OGE		Ogeramnang Airport	Ogeramnang, Papua New Guinea		
OGG	PHOG	Kahului Airport	Kahului, Hawaii, United States		
OGL	SYGO	Ogle Airport	Georgetown, Guyana		
OGM		Ustupu-Ogobsucum Airport	Ustupo, Panama		
OGN	ROYN	Yonaguni Airport	Yonaguni, Yaeyama Islands, Japan	UTC+09:00	
OGO	DIAU	Abengourou Airport	Abengourou, Ivory Coast		
OGR	FTTB	Bongor Airport	Bongor, Chad		
OGS	KOGS	Ogdensburg International Airport	Ogdensburg, New York, United States		
OGU	LTCB	Ordu–Giresun Airport	Ordu / Giresun, Turkey		
OGV	FYNG	Ongava Airstrip	Ongava, Namibia		
OGX	DAUU	Ain Beida Airport	Ouargla, Algeria		
OGZ	URMO	Beslan Airport	Vladikavkaz, North Ossetia-Alania, Russia		
-OH-
OHA	NZOH	RNZAF Base Ohakea	Bulls, New Zealand		
OHB		Ambohibary Airport	Moramanga, Madagascar		
OHD	LWOH	Ohrid "St. Paul the Apostle" Airport	Ohrid, North Macedonia		
OHE	ZYMH	Mohe Gulian Airport	Mohe, Heilongjiang, China	UTC+08:00	
OHH	UHSH	Okha Airport (Novostroyka Airport)	Okha, Sakhalin Oblast, Russia		
OHI	FYOS	Oshakati Airport	Oshakati, Namibia		
OHO	UHOO	Okhotsk Airport	Okhotsk, Khabarovsk Krai, Russia		
OHR	EDXY	Wyk auf Föhr Airport	Wyk auf Föhr, Schleswig-Holstein, Germany	UTC+02:00	Mar-Oct
OHS	OOSH	Sohar Airport	Sohar, Oman		
OHT	OPKT	PAF Base Kohat	Kohat, Pakistan		
-OI-
OIA	SDOW	Ourilândia do Norte Airport	Ourilândia do Norte, Pará, Brazil		
OIC	KOIC	Lt. Warren Eaton Airport	Norwich, New York, United States		
OIM	RJTO	Oshima Airport	Ōshima, Izu Islands, Japan	UTC+09:00	
OIR	RJEO	Okushiri Airport	Okushiri, Okushiri Island, Japan	UTC+09:00	
OIS	UDGS	Goris Airport	Shinuhayr, Armenia		
OIT	RJFO	Oita Airport	Oita, Kyushu, Japan	UTC+09:00	
-OJ-
OJC	KOJC	Johnson County Executive Airport	Olathe, Kansas, United States		
OJU		Tanjung Api Airport	Ampana, Tojo Una-Una Regency, Central Sulawesi, Indonesia		
-OK-
OKA	ROAH	Naha Airport	Okinawa, Ryukyu Islands, Japan	UTC+09:00	
OKB	YORC	Orchid Beach Airport	Fraser Island, Queensland, Australia		
OKC	KOKC	Will Rogers World Airport	Oklahoma City, Oklahoma, United States		
OKD	RJCO	Okadama Airport	Sapporo, Hokkaido, Japan	UTC+09:00	
OKE	RJKB	Okinoerabu Airport	Okinoerabujima, Amami Islands, Japan	UTC+09:00	
OKF	FYOO	Okaukuejo Airport	Okaukuejo, Namibia		
OKG		Okoyo Airport	Okoyo, Republic of the Congo		
OKH	EGXJ	RAF Cottesmore	Oakham, England, United Kingdom	UTC+01:00	Mar-Oct
OKI	RJNO	Oki Airport	Dogo, Oki Islands, Japan	UTC+09:00	
OKJ	RJOB	Okayama Airport	Okayama, Honshu, Japan	UTC+09:00	
OKK	KOKK	Kokomo Municipal Airport	Kokomo, Indiana, United States		
OKL	WAJO	Gunung Bintang Airport	Oksibil, Indonesia		
OKM	KOKM	Okmulgee Regional Airport	Okmulgee, Oklahoma, United States		
OKN	FOGQ	Okondja Airport	Okondja, Gabon		
OKO	RJTY	Yokota Air Base	Fussa, Honshu, Japan	UTC+09:00	
OKP	AYOJ	Oksapmin Airport	Oksapmin, Papua New Guinea		
OKQ	WAKO	Okaba Airport	Okaba, Indonesia		
OKR	YYKI	Yorke Island Airport	Yorke Island, Queensland, Australia		
OKS	KOKS	Garden County Airport	Oshkosh, Nebraska, United States		
OKT	UWUK	Oktyabrsky Airport	Oktyabrsky, Bashkortostan, Russia		
OKU	FYMO	Mokuti Lodge Airport	Mokuti Lodge, Namibia		
OKV		Okao Airport	Okao, Papua New Guinea		
OKY	YBOK	Oakey Army Aviation Centre	Oakey, Queensland, Australia		
-OL-
OLA	ENOL	Ørland Airport	Ørland, Norway		
OLB	LIEO	Olbia Costa Smeralda Airport	Olbia, Sardinia, Italy		
OLC	SDCG	Senadora Eunice Michiles Airport	São Paulo de Olivença, Amazonas, Brazil		
OLD	KOLD	Old Town Municipal Airport and Seaplane Base (Dewitt Field)	Old Town, Maine, United States		
OLE	KOLE	Cattaraugus County-Olean Airport	Olean, New York, United States		
OLF	KOLF	L. M. Clayton Airport	Wolf Point, Montana, United States		
OLH		Old Harbor Airport (FAA: 6R7)	Old Harbor, Alaska, United States		
OLI	BIRF	Rif Airport	Ólafsvík, Iceland		
OLJ	NVSZ	Olpoi Airport (North West Santo Airport)	Olpoi, Vanuatu		
OLK	SGOL	Fuerte Olimpo Airport	Fuerte Olimpo, Paraguay		
OLL		Oyo Ollombo Airport	Oyo, Republic of the Congo		
OLM	KOLM	Olympia Regional Airport	Olympia, Washington, United States		
OLN	SAVM	Lago Musters Airport	Sarmiento, Chubut, Argentina		
OLO	LKOL	Olomouc Airport (Neředín Airport)	Olomouc, Czech Republic		
OLP	YOLD	Olympic Dam Airport	Olympic Dam, South Australia, Australia		
OLQ		Olsobip Airport	Olsobip, Papua New Guinea		
OLR	OASL	Forward Operating Base Salerno	Khost, Afghanistan		
OLS	KOLS	Nogales International Airport	Nogales, Arizona, United States		
OLU	KOLU	Columbus Municipal Airport	Columbus, Nebraska, United States		
OLV	KOLV	Olive Branch Airport	Olive Branch, Mississippi, United States		
OLX		Olkiombo Airstrip	Olkiombo, Kenya		
OLY	KOLY	Olney-Noble Airport	Olney / Noble, Illinois, United States		
OLZ	UEMO	Olyokminsk Airport	Olyokminsk, Yakutia, Russia		
-OM-
OMA	KOMA	Eppley Airfield	Omaha, Nebraska, United States		
OMB	FOOH	Omboué Hospital Airport	Omboué, Gabon		
OMC	RPVO	Ormoc Airport	Ormoc, Philippines		
OMD	FYOG	Oranjemund Airport	Oranjemund, Namibia		
OME	PAOM	Nome Airport	Nome, Alaska, United States		
OMF	OJMF	King Hussein Air Base	Mafraq, Jordan		
OMG	FYOE	Omega Airport	Omega, Namibia		
OMH	OITR	Urmia Airport	Urmia (Urūmiyeh), Iran		
OMI	OIAJ	Omidiyeh Air Base	Omidiyeh, Iran		
OMJ	RJDU	Ōmura Airport	Nagasaki / Ōmura, Kyushu, Japan	UTC+09:00	
OMK	KOMK	Omak Airport	Omak, Washington, United States		
OML		Omkalai Airport	Omkalai, Papua New Guinea		
OMM	OOMX	Marmul Airport	Marmul, Oman		
OMN		Zomin Airport	Zomin, Uzbekistan		
OMO	LQMO	Mostar Airport	Mostar, Bosnia and Herzegovina		
OMR	LROD	Oradea International Airport	Oradea, Romania		
OMS	UNOO	Omsk Tsentralny Airport	Omsk, Omsk Oblast, Russia		
OMY		Thbeng Meanchey Airport (Preah Vinhear Airport)	Phnom Tbeng Meanchey, Cambodia		
-ON-
ONA	KONA	Winona Municipal Airport (Max Conrad Field)	Winona, Minnesota, United States		
ONB	AYQQ	Ononge Airport	Ononge, Papua New Guinea		
OND	FYOA	Ondangwa Airport	Ondangwa, Namibia		
ONE		Onepusu Airport	Onepusu, Solomon Islands		
ONG	YMTI	Mornington Island Airport	Mornington Island, Queensland, Australia		
ONH		Oneonta Municipal Airport (FAA: N66)	Oneonta, New York, United States		
ONI	WABD	Moanamani Airport	Moanemani (Moanamani), Indonesia		
ONJ	RJSR	Odate–Noshiro Airport	Ōdate / Noshiro, Honshu, Japan	UTC+09:00	
ONK	UERO	Olenyok Airport	Olenyok, Yakutia, Russia		
ONL	KONL	O'Neill Municipal Airport (John L. Baker Field)	O'Neill, Nebraska, United States		
ONM	KONM	Socorro Municipal Airport	Socorro, New Mexico, United States		
ONO	KONO	Ontario Municipal Airport	Ontario, Oregon, United States		
ONP	KONP	Newport Municipal Airport	Newport, Oregon, United States		
ONQ	LTAS	Zonguldak Airport	Zonguldak, Turkey		
ONR	YMNK	Monkira Airport	Monkira, Queensland, Australia		
ONS	YOLW	Onslow Airport	Onslow, Western Australia, Australia		
ONT	KONT	Ontario International Airport	Ontario, California, United States		
ONU	NFOL	Ono-i-Lau Airport	Ono-i-Lau, Fiji		
ONX	MPEJ	Enrique Adolfo Jiménez Airport	Colón, Panama		
ONY	KONY	Olney Municipal Airport	Olney, Texas, United States		
-OO-
OOA	KOOA	Oskaloosa Municipal Airport	Oskaloosa, Iowa, United States		
OOK	PAOO	Toksook Bay Airport	Toksook Bay, Alaska, United States		
OOL	YBCG	Gold Coast Airport (Coolangatta Airport)	Gold Coast, Queensland, Australia		
OOM	YCOM	Cooma–Snowy Mountains Airport	Cooma, New South Wales, Australia		
OOR	YMOO	Mooraberree Airport	Mooraberree, Queensland, Australia		
OOT	NGON	Onotoa Airport	Onotoa, Kiribati		
-OP-
OPA	BIKP	Kópasker Airport	Kópasker, Iceland		
OPB		Open Bay Airport	Open Bay, Papua New Guinea		
OPF	KOPF	Miami-Opa Locka Executive Airport	Miami, Florida, United States		
OPI	YOEN	Oenpelli Airport	Gunbalanya (Oenpelli), Northern Territory, Australia		
OPL	KOPL	St. Landry Parish Airport (Ahart Field)	Opelousas, Louisiana, United States		
OPO	LPPR	Francisco de Sá Carneiro Airport	Porto, Portugal		
OPS	SWSI	Presidente João Figueiredo Airport	Sinop, Mato Grosso, Brazil		
OPU	AYBM	Balimo Airport	Balimo, Papua New Guinea		
OPW	FYOP	Opuwa Airport	Opuwo, Namibia		
-OR-
ORA	SASO	Orán Airport	Orán, Salta, Argentina		
ORB	ESOE	Örebro Airport	Örebro, Sweden		
ORC	SKOE	Orocue Airport	Orocué, Colombia		
ORD	KORD	O'Hare International Airport	Chicago, Illinois, United States	UTC−06:00	Mar-Nov
ORE	LFOZ	Orléans – Saint-Denis-de-l'Hôtel Airport	Orléans, Centre-Val de Loire, France	UTC+02:00	Mar-Oct
ORF	KORF	Norfolk International Airport	Norfolk, Virginia, United States		
ORG	SMZO	Zorg en Hoop Airport	Paramaribo, Suriname		
ORH	KORH	Worcester Regional Airport	Worcester, Massachusetts, United States		
ORI	KORI	Port Lions Airport	Port Lions, Alaska, United States		
ORJ	SYOR	Orinduik Airport	Orinduik, Guyana		
ORK	EICK	Cork Airport	Cork, Ireland		
ORL	KORL	Orlando Executive Airport	Orlando, Florida, United States		
ORM	EGBK	Sywell Aerodrome	Northampton, England, United Kingdom	UTC+01:00	Mar-Oct
ORN	DAOO	Oran Es Sénia Airport	Oran, Algeria		
ORO	MHYR	Yoro Airport	Yoro, Honduras		
ORP	FBOR	Orapa Airport	Orapa, Botswana		
ORR	YYOR	Yorketown Airport	Yorketown, South Australia, Australia		
ORS		Orpheus Island Resort Waterport	Orpheus Island, Queensland, Australia		
ORT	PAOR	Northway Airport	Northway, Alaska, United States		
ORU	SLOR	Juan Mendoza Airport	Oruro, Bolivia		
ORV	PFNO	Robert (Bob) Curtis Memorial Airport (FAA: D76)	Noorvik, Alaska, United States		
ORW	OPOR	Ormara Airport	Ormara, Pakistan		
ORX	SNOX	Oriximiná Airport	Oriximiná, Pará, Brazil		
ORY	LFPO	Orly Airport	Paris, Île-de-France, France	UTC+02:00	Mar-Oct
ORZ	MZTH	Orange Walk Airport	Orange Walk Town, Belize		
-OS-
OSA		metropolitan area^{1}	Osaka, Honshu, Japan		
OSB		Grand Glaize-Osage Beach Airport (FAA: K15)	Osage Beach, Missouri, United States		
OSC	KOSC	Oscoda–Wurtsmith Airport	Oscoda, Michigan, United States		
OSD	ESNZ	Åre Östersund Airport	Östersund, Sweden		
OSE		Omora Airport	Omora, Papua New Guinea		
OSF	UUMO	Ostafyevo International Airport	Moscow / Podolsk, Moscow Oblast, Russia		
OSG		Ossima Airport	Ossima, Papua New Guinea		
OSH	KOSH	Wittman Regional Airport	Oshkosh, Wisconsin, United States		
OSI	LDOS	Osijek Airport	Osijek, Croatia		
OSK	ESMO	Oskarshamn Airport	Oskarshamn, Sweden		
OSL	ENGM	Oslo Airport, Gardermoen	Oslo, Norway		
OSM	ORBM	Mosul International Airport	Mosul, Iraq		
OSN	RKSO	Osan Air Base	Osan, South Korea		
OSO	YOSB	Osborne Mine Airport	Osborne Mine, Queensland, Australia		
OSR	LKMT	Leoš Janáček Airport Ostrava	Ostrava, Czech Republic		
OSS	UAFO	Osh Airport	Osh, Kyrgyzstan		
OST	EBOS	Ostend–Bruges International Airport	Ostend / Bruges, Belgium		
OSU	KOSU	Ohio State University Airport	Columbus, Ohio, United States		
OSW	UWOR	Orsk Airport	Orsk, Orenburg Oblast, Russia		
OSX	KOSX	Kosciusko-Attala County Airport	Kosciusko, Mississippi, United States		
OSY	ENNM	Namsos Airport, Høknesøra	Namsos, Norway		
OSZ	EPKZ	Koszalin-Zegrze Pomorskie Airport	Koszalin, Poland		
-OT-
OTA		Mota Airport	Mota, Ethiopia		
OTC	FTTL	Bol-Bérim Airport	Bol, Chad		
OTD		Contadora Airport	Contadora Island, Panama		
OTG	KOTG	Worthington Municipal Airport	Worthington, Minnesota, United States		
OTH	KOTH	Southwest Oregon Regional Airport	North Bend, Oregon, United States		
OTI	WAMR	Pitu Airport	Morotai Island, Indonesia		
OTJ	FYOW	Otjiwarongo Airport	Otjiwarongo, Namibia		
OTK	KTMK	Tillamook Airport (FAA: TMK)	Tillamook, Oregon, United States		
OTL	GQNB	Boutilimit Airport	Boutilimit, Mauritania		
OTM	KOTM	Ottumwa Regional Airport	Ottumwa, Iowa, United States		
OTN		Ed-Air Airport (FAA: 2IG4)	Oaktown, Indiana, United States		
OTP	LROP	Henri Coandă International Airport	Bucharest, Romania		
OTR	MRCC	Coto 47 Airport	Coto 47, Costa Rica		
OTS		Anacortes Airport (FAA: 74S)	Anacortes, Washington, United States		
OTT		Andre Maggi Airport	Cotriguaçu, Mato Grosso, Brazil		
OTU	SKOT	Otú Airport	Remedios, Colombia		
OTV	AGGQ	Ontong Java Airport	Ontong Java Atoll, Solomon Islands		
OTY		Oria Airport	Oria, Papua New Guinea		
OTZ	PAOT	Ralph Wien Memorial Airport	Kotzebue, Alaska, United States		
-OU-
OUA	DFFD	Ouagadougou Airport	Ouagadougou, Burkina Faso		
OUD	GMFO	Angads Airport	Oujda, Morocco		
OUE	FCOU	Ouésso Airport	Ouésso, Republic of the Congo		
OUG	DFCC	Ouahigouya Airport	Ouahigouya, Burkina Faso		
OUH	FAOH	Oudtshoorn Airport	Oudtshoorn, South Africa		
OUK		Out Skerries Airport	Out Skerries, Scotland, United Kingdom	UTC+01:00	Mar-Oct
OUL	EFOU	Oulu Airport	Oulu, Finland		
OUM		Oum Hadjer Airport	Oum Hadjer, Chad		
OUN	KOUN	University of Oklahoma Westheimer Airport (Max Westheimer Airport)	Norman, Oklahoma, United States		
OUR	FKKI	Batouri Airport	Batouri, Cameroon		
OUS	SDOU	Jornalista Benedito Pimentel–Ourinhos State Airport	Ourinhos, São Paulo, Brazil		
OUT	FTTS	Bousso Airport	Bousso, Chad		
OUU		Ouanga Airport	Ouanga, Gabon		
OUZ	GQPZ	Tazadit Airport	Zouerate, Mauritania		
-OV-
OVA	FMSL	Bekily Airport	Bekily, Madagascar		
OVB	UNNT	Tolmachevo Airport	Novosibirsk, Novosibirsk Oblast, Russia		
OVD	LEAS	Asturias Airport (Oviedo Airport)	Oviedo, Asturias, Spain	UTC+02:00	Mar-Oct
OVE	KOVE	Oroville Municipal Airport	Oroville, California, United States		
OVG	FAOB	Air Force Base Overberg	Bredasdorp, South Africa		
OVL	SCOV	El Tuqui Airport	Ovalle, Chile		
OVR	SAZF	Olavarría Airport	Olavarría, Buenos Aires, Argentina		
OVS	USHS	Sovetsky Airport	Sovetsky, Khanty-Mansi Autonomous Okrug, Russia		
-OW-
OWA	KOWA	Owatonna Degner Regional Airport	Owatonna, Minnesota, United States		
OWB	KOWB	Owensboro–Daviess County Airport	Owensboro, Kentucky, United States		
OWD	KOWD	Norwood Memorial Airport	Norwood, Massachusetts, United States		
OWK	KOWK	Central Maine Airport of Norridgewock	Norridgewock, Maine, United States		
-OX-
OXB	GGOV	Osvaldo Vieira International Airport	Bissau, Guinea-Bissau		
OXC	KOXC	Waterbury–Oxford Airport	Oxford, Connecticut, United States		
OXD	KOXD	Miami University Airport	Oxford, Ohio, United States		
OXF	EGTK	Oxford Airport (London Oxford Airport)	Oxford, England, United Kingdom	UTC+01:00	Mar-Oct
OXO		Orientos Airport	Orientos, Queensland, Australia		
OXR	KOXR	Oxnard Airport	Oxnard, California, United States		
OXY	YMNY	Morney Airport	Morney, Queensland, Australia		
-OY-
OYA	SATG	Goya Airport	Goya, Corrientes, Argentina		
OYE	FOGO	Oyem Airport	Oyem, Gabon		
OYG		Moyo Airport	Moyo Town, Uganda		
OYK	SBOI	Oiapoque Airport	Oiapoque, Amapá, Brazil		
OYL	HKMY	Moyale Airport	Moyale, Kenya		
OYN	YOUY	Ouyen Airport	Ouyen, Victoria, Australia		
OYO	SAZH	Tres Arroyos Airport	Tres Arroyos, Buenos Aires, Argentina		
OYP	SOOG	Saint-Georges-de-l'Oyapock Airport	Saint-Georges-de-l'Oyapock, French Guiana		
-OZ-
OZA	KOZA	Ozona Municipal Airport	Ozona, Texas, United States		
OZC	RPMO	Labo Airport	Ozamiz, Philippines		
OZG	GMAZ	Zagora Airport	Zagora, Morocco		
OZH	UKDE	Zaporizhzhia International Airport	Zaporizhzhia, Ukraine		
OZP	LEMO	Morón Air Base	Morón de la Frontera, Andalusia, Spain	UTC+02:00	Mar-Oct
OZR	KOZR	Cairns Army Airfield	Fort Novosel / Ozark, Alabama, United States		
OZZ	GMMZ	Ouarzazate Airport	Ouarzazate, Morocco		

== Notes ==
- ^1 OSA is common IATA code for Kansai International Airport (IATA: KIX), Osaka International Airport (IATA: ITM) and Kobe Airport (IATA: UKB).
