= Polish Medical Air Rescue =

Air ambulance service in Poland

- Lotnicze Pogotowie Ratunkowe
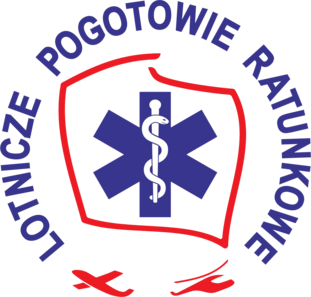
- Abbreviation: LPR
- Type: Air ambulance service
- Legal status: Samodzielny publiczny zakład opieki zdrowotnej
- Headquarters: Warsaw, Poland
- Region served: Poland
- Funding: Government budget
- Website: www.lpr.com.pl

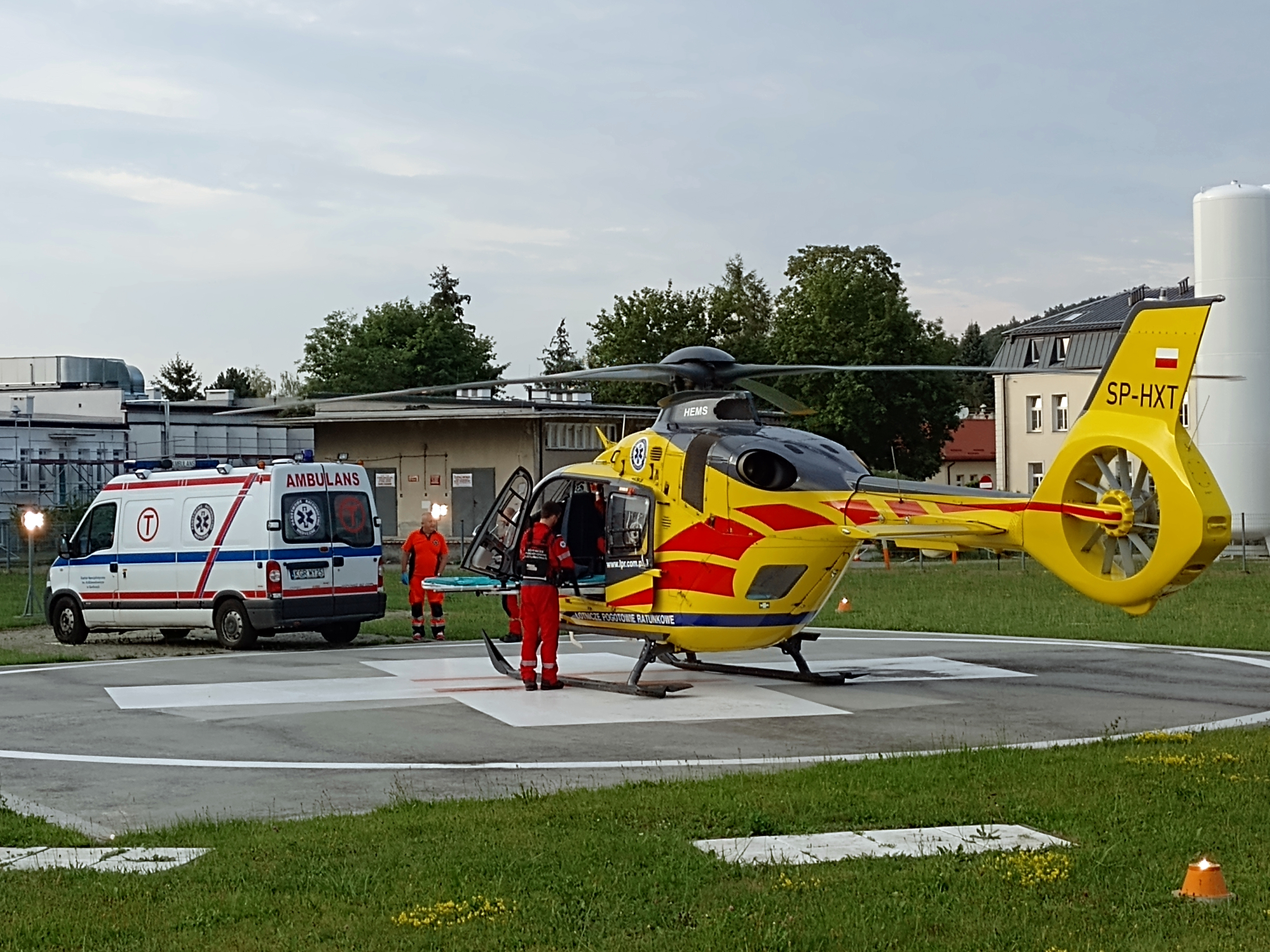
Helicopter Polish Medical Air Rescue (LPR), transporting a patient from Gorlice to another hospital

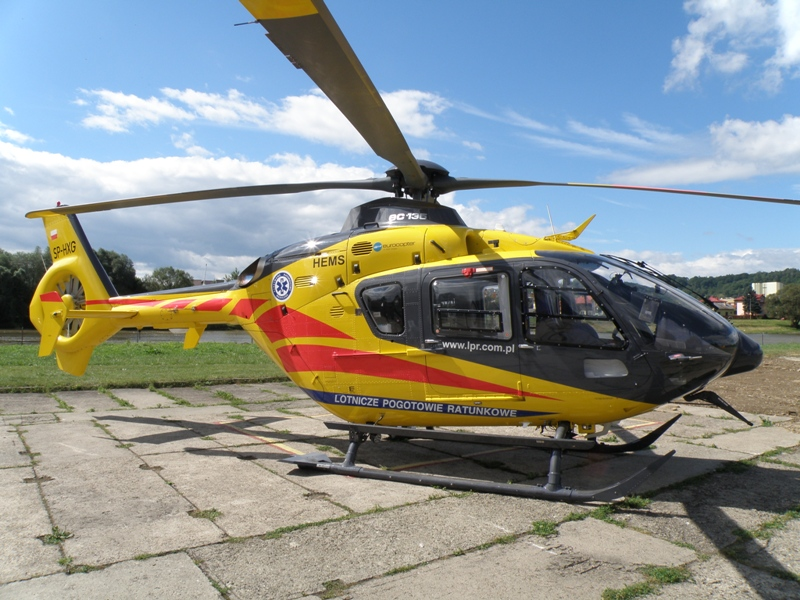
Eurocopter EC135 in Sanok

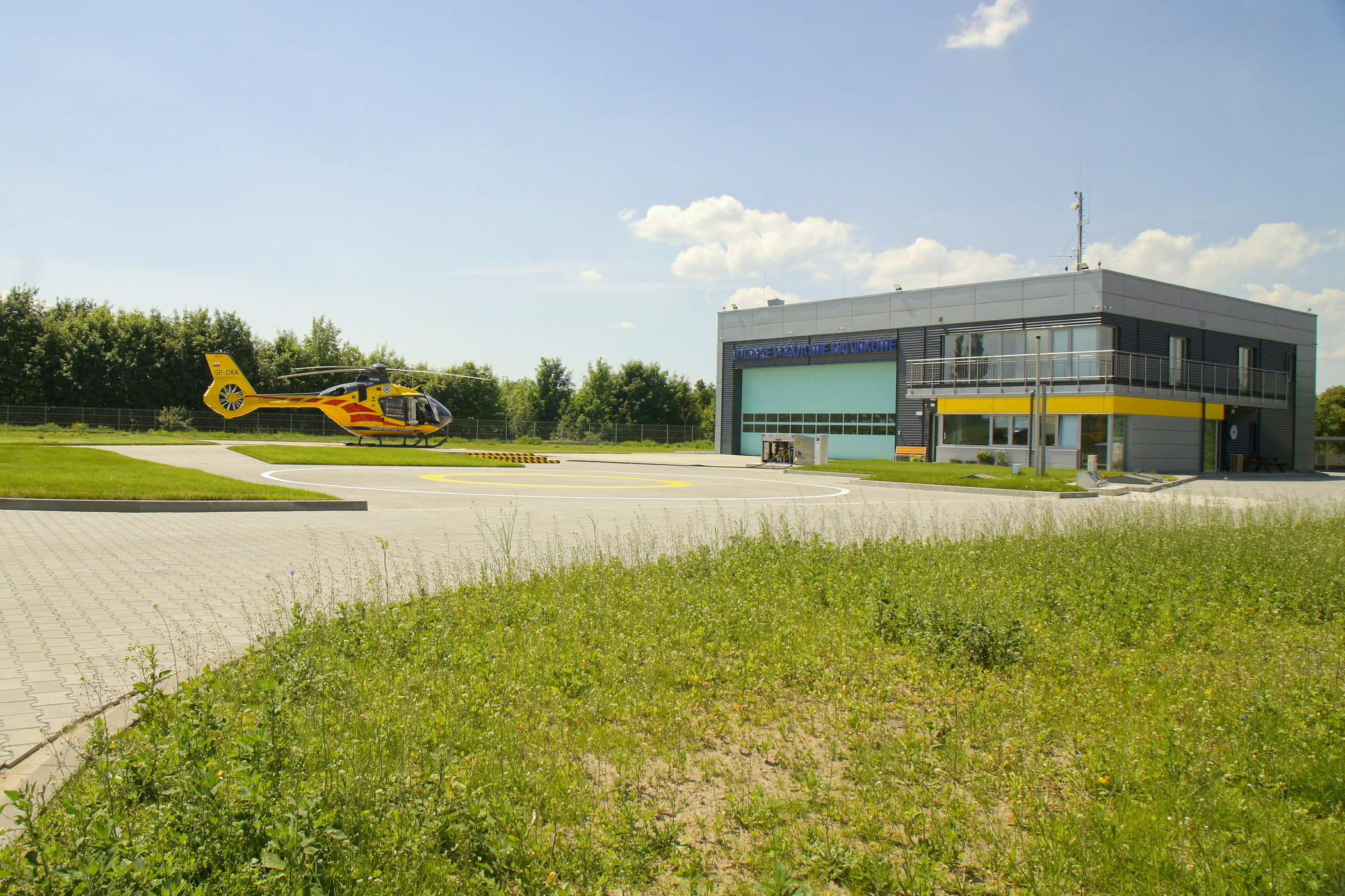
Helicopter field in Gorzów Wielkopolski

The Polish Medical Air Rescue (Polish: Lotnicze Pogotowie Ratunkowe, lit. 'Aerial Emergency Medical Service', LPR) is an air ambulance service providing Poland with helicopter emergency medical services within the State Medical Rescue, publicly funded system of urgent medical care, and aerial patient transfer services that can be requested by any health care provider.

Other Polish institutions providing air ambulance services include Tatra Volunteer Search and Rescue with its PZL W-3 Sokół helicopter and SAR units of Polish Navy.

== Fleet ==
Image	Aircraft	Variant	Number
Helicopters
	EC135	P2+	17
	EC135	P3	9
Airplanes
	Piaggio P.180 Avanti	Avanti	1
	Piaggio P.180 Avanti	Avanti II	1
	Learjet 75	Learjet 75 Liberty	2
Training aircraft
	Robinson R44	Raven II	2
	Tecnam P2008	Tecnam P2008JC MkII	3

== Operations ==
LPR operates 21 permanent and one seasonal HEMS bases throughout Poland. There's at least one permanent base in each of the voivodeships.

Code name Ratownik	Location		Aerodrome	On duty 7 days a week	Aircraft	Link
Code name Ratownik	City (Note: Major city the base is located near by and assigned to.)	Voivodeship	Aerodrome	On duty 7 days a week	Aircraft	Link
1	Białystok	Podlaskie	Białystok-Krywlany Airport	7:00 am – 8:00 pm	EC 135	
2	Bydgoszcz	Kuyavian-Pomeranian	—N/a (Note: The base is not part of other pre-existing aerodrome.)	7:00 am – 8:00 pm	EC 135	
3	Gdańsk	Pomeranian	Gdańsk Lech Wałęsa Airport	24 h/day	EC 135	
4	Katowice	Silesian	Katowice-Muchowiec Airport	7:00 am – 8:00 pm	EC 135	
5	Kielce	Świętokrzyskie	Kielce-Masłów Airport	7:00 am – 8:00 pm	EC 135	
6	Kraków	Lesser Poland	—N/a	24 h/day	EC 135	
7	Lublin	Lublin	Lublin Airport	24 h/day	EC 135	
8	Olsztyn	Warmian–Masurian	Gryźliny Airstrip	7:00 am – 8:00 pm	EC 135	
9	Poznań	Greater Poland	Poznań–Ławica Airport	24 h/day	EC 135	
10	Sanok	Subcarpathian	Sanok-Baza Airport	7:00 am – 8:00 pm	EC 135	
11	Szczecin	West Pomeranian	Solidarity Szczecin–Goleniów Airport	7:00 am – 8:00 pm	EC 135	
12	Warsaw	Masovian	Warsaw Babice Airport	24 h/day	EC 135	
13	Wrocław	Lower Silesian	Wrocław Airport	24 h/day	EC 135	
15	Zielona Góra	Lubuskie	Zielona Góra-Przylep Airport	7:00 am – 8:00 pm	EC 135	
16	Łódź	Łódź	Łódź Władysław Reymont Airport	7:00 am – 8:00 pm	EC 135	
17	Suwałki	Podlaskie	Suwałki Airport	7:00 am – 8:00 pm	EC 135	
18	Płock	Masovian	Płock Airport	7:00 am – 8:00 pm	EC 135	
19	Sokołów Podlaski	Masovian	—N/a	7:00 am – 8:00 pm	EC 135	
21	Ostrów Wielkopolski	Greater Poland	Ostrów Wielkopolski-Michałków Airport	7:00 am – 8:00 pm	EC 135	
22	Koszalin	West Pomeranian	Zegrze Pomorskie Airport	seasonal base (Note: Operational from 1 June to 5 September); 7:00 am – 8:00 pm	EC 135	
23	Opole	Opole	Opole-Polska Nowa Wieś Airport	7:00 am – 8:00 pm	EC 135	
24	Gorzów Wielkopolski	Lubuskie	—N/a	7:00 am – 8:00 pm	EC 135	

Patient transfer team and its 4 airplanes are stationed at the Warsaw Chopin Airport and are on duty 24 hour a day seven days a week.

== See also ==
- Emergency medical services in Poland
- Health care in Poland
