= Kielce-Masłów Airport =

Kielce-Masłów Airport Port Lotniczy Kielce-Masłów
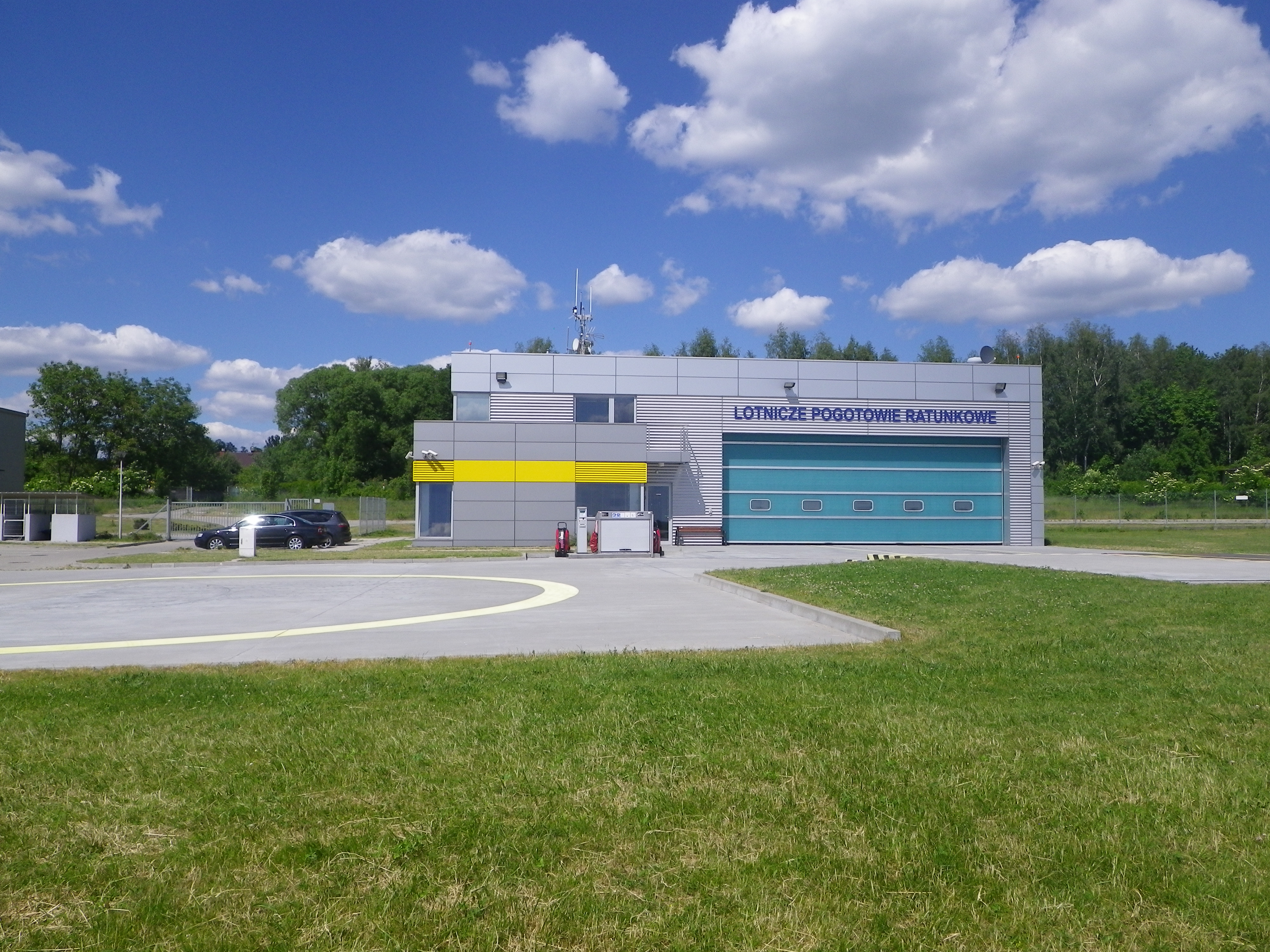
- Air Ambulance station at Kielce-Masłów airfield
- IATA: none; ICAO: EPKA

Summary
- Airport type: Public
- Serves: Kielce, Poland
- Elevation AMSL: 1,010 ft / 308 m
- Coordinates: 50°53′51″N 20°44′02″E
- Website: www.lotniskokielce.pl/

Map
- Location of airport in Poland

Runways
| Direction | Length | | Surface |
| Direction | m | ft | Surface |
|---|---|---|---|
| 11/29 | 1,115 | 99 | Asphalt |

Statistics (2015 +/- change from 2014)
- Passengers: 0
- Cargo (in tons): 0
- Takeoffs/Landings: 0
- Source: Polish AIP at EUROCONTROL

Kielce, and the Świętokrzyskie Voivodeship of which it the capital of, intend to adapt the airport in Masłów (near Kielce), for regional traffic. Its current runway is asphalt, and its size is 1115 x 30 meters. It is planned to develop the airport, but rather to the category of a City Airport. The local government have founded a company "Lotnisko Kielce" with the goal to upgrade the airport. There are also discussions to build a completely new airport in Obice.

Falcon 6X SP-ARG of local businessman Michal Solowow is based here.

== History ==
The airport opened in 1937.
In 2011, the main runway (11/29) was extended from 900 m to 1,155 m.

In 2013 Polish Medical Air Rescue opened their new base with one Eurocopter EC135, every year in May, there is a openday, when people can sightsee the base.

On 26 July 2025 Aeroklub Kielecki to celebrate its 80th anniversary, the local Aero Club organised the largest air show in the airport's history.

== See also ==
- List of airports in Poland
- Air ambulances in Poland
