= O27 =

O27 may refer to:

- Fokker O-27, an observation aircraft of the United States Army Air Corps
- HNLMS O 27, a submarine of the Royal Netherlands Navy
- O27 gauge, a model railway scale
- Oakdale Airport, in Stanislaus County, California, United States
- Oxygen-27, an isotope of oxygen
