= Olsztyn-Mazury Airport =

Olsztyn-Mazury Airport Port lotniczy Olsztyn-Mazury

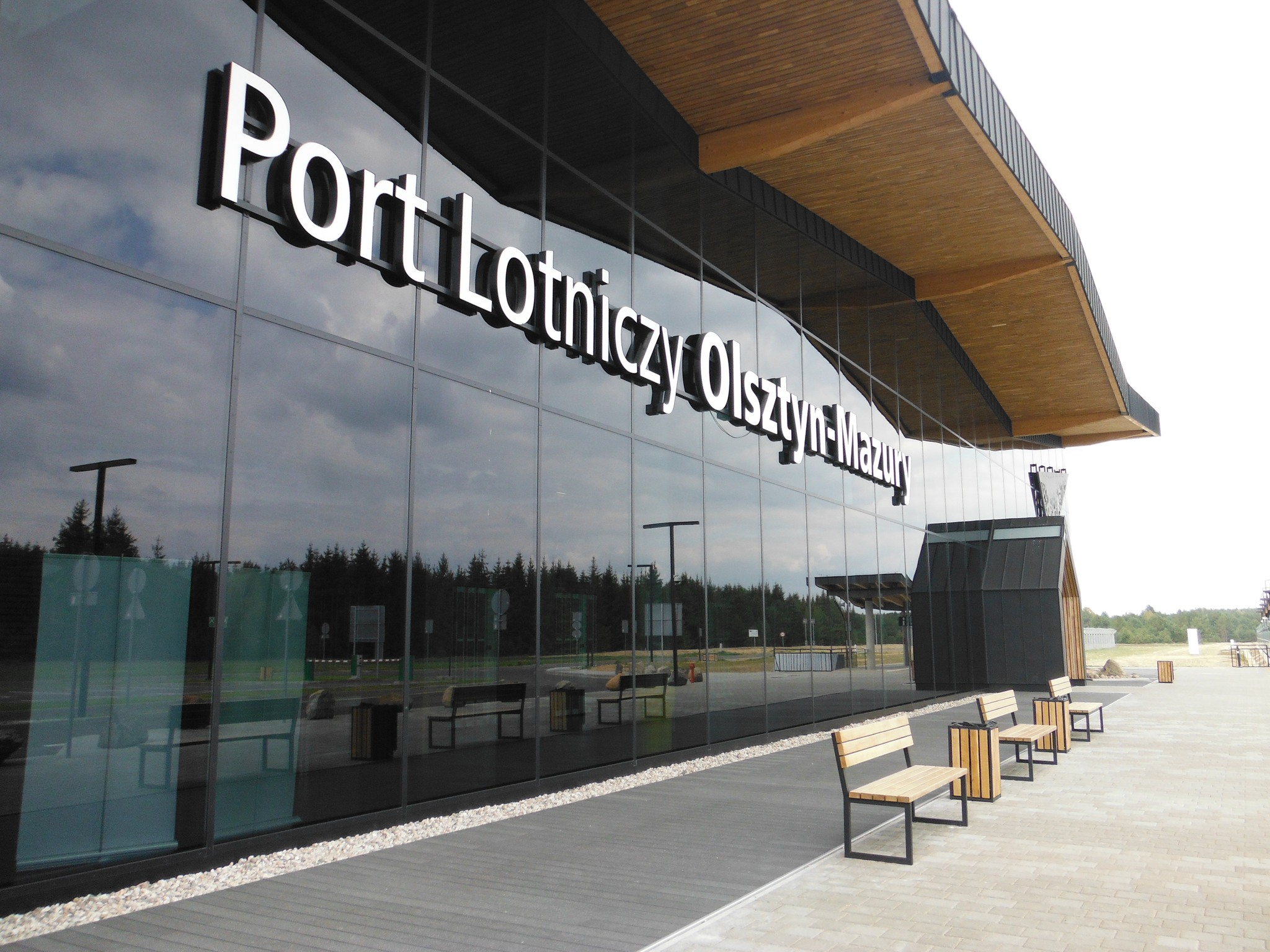
- IATA: SZY; ICAO: EPSY

Summary
- Airport type: International
- Operator: Warmia i Mazury Sp. z o.o.
- Serves: Olsztyn, Poland
- Location: Szczytno
- Elevation AMSL: 464 ft (141 m)
- Coordinates: 53°28′55″N 20°56′16″E
- Website: mazuryairport.pl/en/

Map
- Location in Poland

Runways
Direction	Length		Surface
Direction	m	ft	Surface
01/19	2,500	8,202	Concrete

Statistics (2018)
- Passengers served: 121 300

Olsztyn-Mazury Airport (IATA: SZY, ICAO: EPSY) (Polish: Port lotniczy Olsztyn-Mazury) is an international passenger airport in the North-East of Poland, branded as the gateway to the Masurian Lake District. It is located near Szymany, about 10 km from the centre of Szczytno in the Warmian-Masurian Voivodeship. The airport was previously known as Szymany Airport or Szczytno-Szymany Airport.

It originally served as air base for the Germans during World War II and later for the Polish Air Force. After it lost its military importance with the end of the Cold War, it served as a passenger airport for a few years at the turn of the millennium. Flights were sporadic and passenger numbers very low, so it ceased operations again around 2003. The Szymany Airport received international attention after it was discovered the airfield was used by the CIA in conjunction with a black site prison nearby in 2003.

From 2014 to 2015, the airport was rebuilt with high EU subsidies as part of the "Regional Operational Programme Warmia and Mazury 2007–2013". Its runway was extended and overhauled; a new terminal, railway link and further facilities were erected. In January 2016, the airport re-opened for scheduled flights.

== Location ==
The airport ostensibly serves Olsztyn (population 175,000; its agglomeration comprises 270,000 inhabitants), the capital of Warmian-Masurian Voivodeship (with 1.5 million inhabitants). It is a renovated international airport with old toponymic name Szczytno-Szymany. After years of no passenger operations, it resumed flight service on 20 January 2016 with a flight to Berlin, Germany. The airport has a newly extended and resurfaced runway that is 2500 meters long and 60 meters wide, a new ILS system, and is located in Szymany in Mazury region. Its toponymic Szczytno–Szymany reflects largely obscure localities. The airport management has rebranded the airport to as "Olsztyn-Mazury”, that would better encapsulate the whole region of Mazury and its lakes, which is more well known.

The airport is situated 59 kilometres to the south of Olsztyn, at the border with more densely populated Mazowsze region. There are also other larger towns (50,000–60,000 people) within 60 kilometres of this airport, such as Mława, Ciechanów, Ostrołęka. This airport has in its catchment area a population of 2.7 million people in both voivodeships.

In order to provide easy access, a new rail link to the airport was furnished, using a rail branch. The journey to the centre of Olsztyn takes around 50 minutes. In future, a rail link to Białystok through Ostrołęka, and another to Ełk could be organised by putting railcars on unused rail lines.

== History ==
=== Foundation and early years ===
The first passenger airport in Olsztyn Area was Olsztyn-Dajtki airport that served flights to Bydgoszcz, Warszawa, Gdańsk and Berlin from 1926 until 1958. Despite the eventual cessation of scheduled services between the aforementioned destinations, the airport is still operational as a flight school and general aviation airfield.

The airfield in Szymany originates from 1933. Back then it was located in Germany, just kilometres away from the Polish border. Being hidden within the woods, the airfield could be used as a temporary facility during the war. It was used this way in 1939 during the invasion in Poland.

In 1945, the small airfield was in the hands of the Soviet army. As they were not interested in the facility, they left it in autumn 1945. The former field held a 1200m by 60m (3937 ft by 197 ft) runway, of which the remains still remain clearly distinguishable near the current field as a large, rectangular clearing in the neighbouring forest. Now located in Poland, the Polish army acquired it. In the 1950s and 1960s it was expanded and assigned as backup airport. It was developed on a low stage for many years, in the second half of the 1970s it received a control tower and further buildings.
In the 1990s, when the cold war had ended, the airfield in Szymany lost its importance and was finally left.

=== Passenger operations from 1996 to 2003 ===
In the 1990s, the airport readied to also handle passenger flights. To allow this, a civil airport operator was established in January 1996. A first civil aircraft landed in June 1996, an ATR turboprop aircraft operated by state-owned LOT Polish Airlines To serve these flights a small passenger terminal was opened and operated.

The majority of passenger flights to land in Szymany were charter flights from German destinations like Cologne, Dortmund, Hannover and Stuttgart. The flights were sporadic during the summer months.

The civil operator was owned through various municipal governments and state companies. It was not very successful and made very high losses. In 2003, passenger flights came to an end. The company ended its activity in 2004 with 3 million Zloty in debts.

In 2005, Szymany airport officials were in talks with Ryanair about launching flights from Szymany from 2006 on. The low-cost airline planned to connect Szymany with London and Germany using its Boeing 737-800 aircraft. The resumption of flights would have required renovation and expansion of terminal facilities and the runway, costing some five to six million Polish Zloty. The conferences to open the airport stalled, however, and as a result the airfield was left as it was, without any client/operator running flights to the airfield, save for the occasional business flight.

=== Involvement in CIA operations ===
The airport gained attention in the press in 2005, when it was alleged to have a connection with a so-called black site involved in the CIA's network of extraordinary renditions. Terrorist suspects were to be secretly held, and even tortured, in violation of Polish law, by the CIA. Flight records show that an airplane leased by the CIA flying from Kabul to Guantanamo Bay made a stop in Szymany. Officials from the airport have confirmed that some of these flights bypassed normal customs-clearing procedures, and that during the time of these landings, the airport regularly received visits by cars bearing markings associated with the Stare Kiejkuty intelligence training school outside the nearby village of Stare Kiejkuty.

As recently as November, 2006, the European Parliament investigative commission led by Claudio Fava had been told, when asked for the flight logs of 11 specific flights observed to have transited through Szymany, that "[the records] have [not] been retained, have been faxed and destroyed, and finally said to have been saved in an unspecified place." The commission report also quotes Szymany officials as confirming six occasions in 2002 and 2003 when Gulfstream jets bearing civilian registration numbers had landed at the airport, bypassing customs clearance. Airport officials had been directly ordered not to approach the aircraft, and vehicles bearing military registration numbers affiliated with the nearby base at Stare Kiejkuty awaited the arrival of each aircraft.

In June 2008 a New York Times article claimed, citing unnamed CIA officers, that Khalid Sheikh Mohammed was held in a secret facility in Poland near Szymany Airport and it was there that he was interrogated and waterboarded before beginning to cooperate.

In February 2010 Polish officials recanted previous denials, and admitted that at least six CIA flights passed through Szymany in 2003.

=== Reconstruction as international passenger airport ===
Following several quiet years, ideas again come up to reconstruct the airport in order to resume passenger services. By the end of 2013, plans became very substantial. An investment of 200 million was planned that included extension and renovation of the runway from 2000 to 2500 metres, aprons, taxiways and a brand new terminal. 76 percent of the investment could be funded by the European Union with local government paying the remainder. EU funds would only be granted as long the reconstruction airport would be operative by the end of 2015, resulting in tight schedule for construction.

The initiators of the project estimated a passenger volume of 56,000 travelers in the first years with an expected growth within twenty years to 731,000 passengers. Aircraft movements should initially be around 5600 per year, growing to 17,000 during the same period.

In early August 2014, Mostostal won the tender for construction of the terminal after the original tender was cancelled.

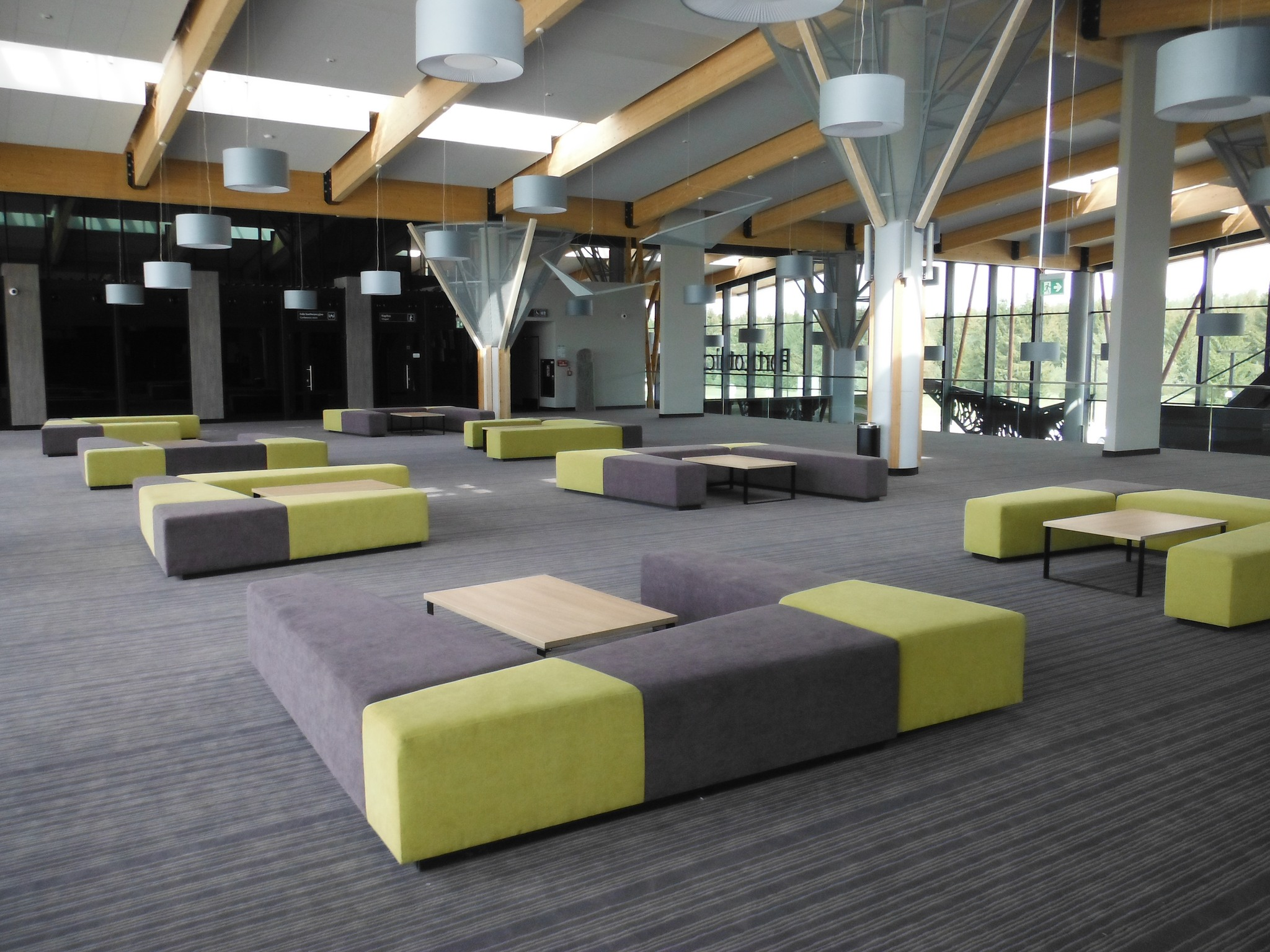
Terminal interior

=== Beginning of scheduled passenger services in January 2016 ===
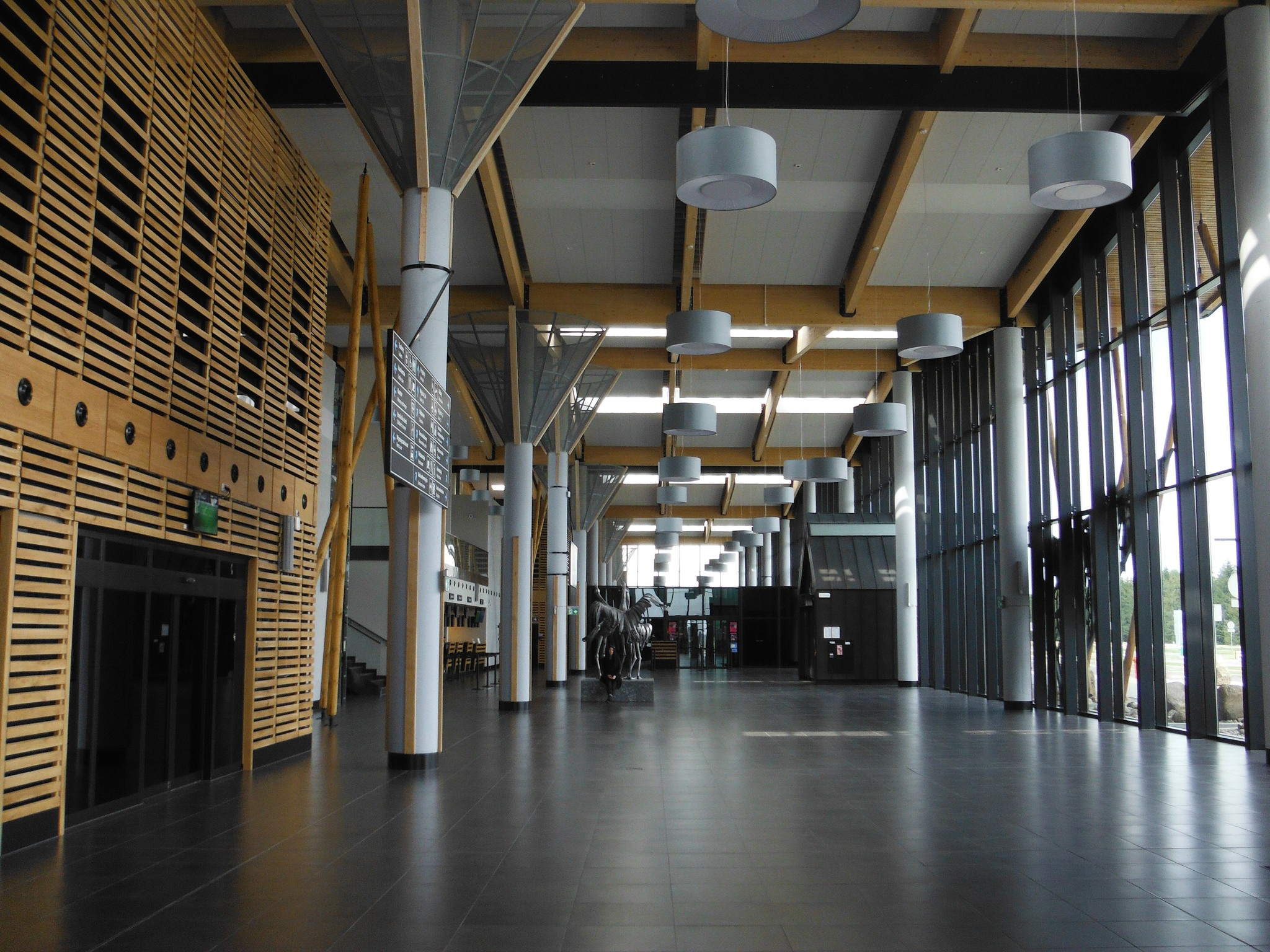
Check-in desk in the terminal

In October, it became public that the airport planned to have connections to Munich, Berlin and Kraków initially.

In late October 2015, the airport finally signed an agreement with Polish airline Sprint Air. The airline set aside one 33-seated Saab 340 aircraft for operations. Starting January 2016, the airline would serve Berlin Tegel and Kraków, each thrice-weekly. The contract for the subsidized flights was just valid for the first quarter of 2016 in first place. Tickets to Kraków were available from 99 PLN while Berlin was starting at 149 PLN.

On 20 January 2016, the first ever scheduled passenger flight took off from the airport with a SprintAir service to Berlin Tegel Airport. On 7 March 2016, the airport announced that it has extended its contract with Sprint Air beyond late March to 3 June 2016. The continues to service Berlin Tegel and Kraków thrice weekly, although with a slightly modified schedule.

The first jet route was announced to Munich on 1 April 2016. Starting 17 June 2016, Adria Airways operated a thrice-weekly connection to Munich onboard its CRJ aircraft. Adria Airways was the flag-carrier of Slovenia until it went bankrupt in 2019. At that time it had already gained a lot of experience outside of Slovenia, also in Poland where an aircraft is based in Łódź. Furthermore, it operated in Albania and Kosova and supported the establishment of the new Estonian flag-carrier before its bankruptcy.

Another route was just one week later, a thrice-weekly connection to London Luton operated by Wizzair. Wizzair thereby made Olsztyn Mazury its ninth destination in Poland. Flights were due to commence just one day after the Adria Airways launch, on 18 June 2016. Wizz Air is known for their all-Airbus fleet of A320s and A321s, meaning that a greater number of passengers can be served through the airport rather than with CRJs and Dash-8 aircraft alone.

On 23 May, SprintAir got renewed its contract to also cover flights beyond 5 June to the end of the summer schedule. In this occasion, a third route with the airline to Wroclaw, starting on 6 June, was announced.

Ryanair was then selected to become the second low-cost carrier to land in Olsztyn. Commencing on 1 November 2016, the carrier was set to service London Stansted thrice a week on its Boeing 737-800 aircraft, despite the fact that its counterpart Wizzair already would serve London Luton thrice a week then. The decision was made public on 31 May with a promotional flight was done to the airport.

By mid-June 2016, LOT Polish Airlines opened bookings for a three-weekly service from Olsztyn to their hub Warsaw on board their 78-seated Bombardier Q400. Running in the middle of the day, the service should deliver many connection options to other destinations within the LOT network. Flights were announced to take place from 2 July to 1 October 2016.

In the first of months of operation, the airport saw only two routes flown by Sprint Air. However, a lot of new airlines were announced in the meanwhile as outlined, namely Adria Airways, LOT Polish Airlines, Ryanair and Wizzair. The first of them to start was Adria Airways in June. On 30 July 2016, the new Olsztyn-Mazury Airport handled its 15,000th passenger.

In August 2016, Adria Airways announced that it would terminate its subsidies route to Munich on 28 October 2016. SprintAir operated its final service in Szymany on 30 October 2016 after its contract was terminated. Thereby, only low-cost flights were scheduled during the winter schedule 2016/17.

== Airlines and destinations ==
The following airlines operate regular scheduled and charter flights to and from Olsztyn:

Airlines	Destinations
Air 001	Seasonal charter: Marsa Alam
LOT Polish Airlines	Kraków
Ryanair	London–Stansted, Weeze
Tailwind Airlines	Seasonal charter: Antalya, Tirana
Wizz Air	Dortmund

== Ground transportation ==
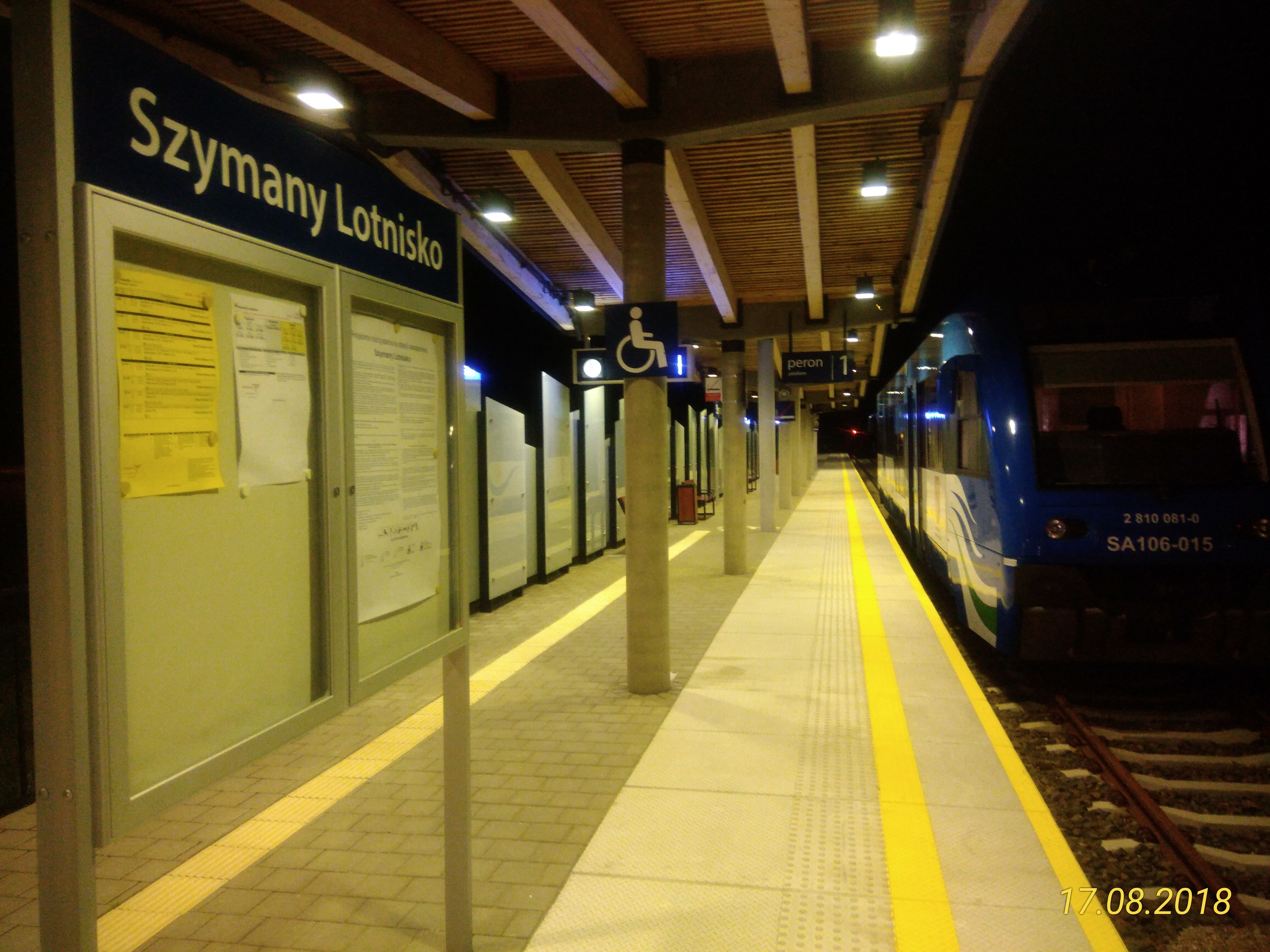
Platform of the airport station

The airport has railway access that has been operative since the scheduled flights started in January 2016. The distance to the town of Olsztyn is 55 kilometres, with the journey taking 50 minutes. As of April 2016, trains run synchronized with the flights.
Rail services are currently performed by government-owned Polregio.

To adequately service the anticipated new airport, an existing rail line from Olsztyn to Szczytno (line 219) and a section of the disused railway 35 line between Szczytno and Szymany were renovated. The renovation allows trains to travel at up to 100 kilometres per hour on a single-track line without electrification. The tender was closed in 2011. Later on a short branch line to the airport and a new station at the airport connected the service. Overall, the reconstruction of existing infrastructure and the new spur had a planned value of PLN 115M (€27.2M), of which PLN 68M (€16.1M) was funded through the European Union.

Following the completion of the renovation of the railway Olsztyn-Szczytno-Szymany and the decision to rebuild the airport, the construction of an airport link was announced in early 2014. The tender was closed in September 2014 and contained the construction of a 1.6-kilometre branch line between connecting railway line 35 with the airport, a railway station at the airport and a control centre at Szczytno. This project had a value of more than 60M PLN.

== See also ==
- List of airports in Poland
