= List of airports in Poland =

This is a list of airports in Poland, sorted by location, IATA and ICAO airport codes, passenger traffic and runway surface.

An additional airport, slated to open in 2028, is planned for greater Warsaw. Warsaw Solidarity Airport, also known as Central Communication Port/Centralny Port Komunikacyjny Airport, will be 25 miles southwest of the national capital in Baranów.

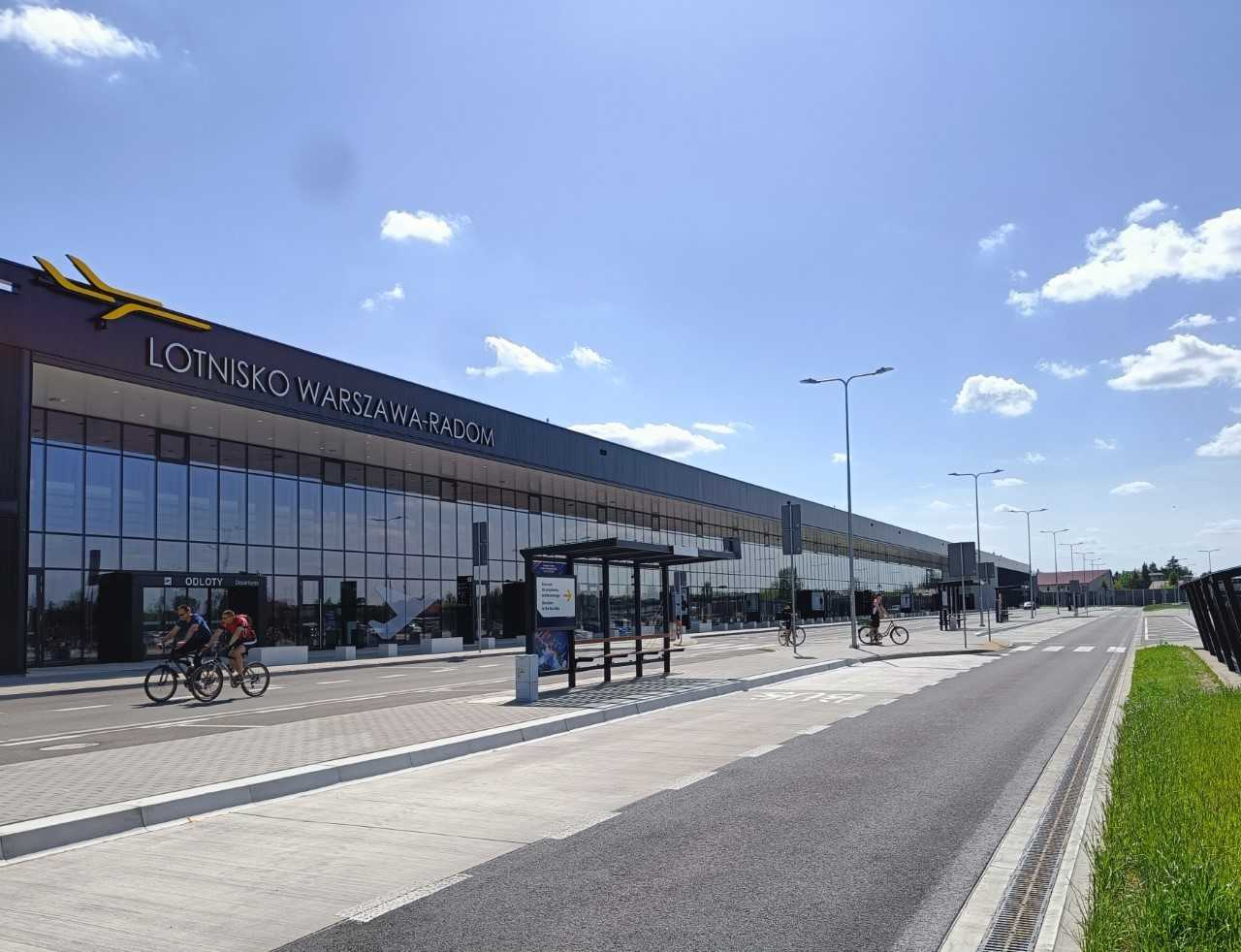
A new terminal at Warsaw Radom Airport in Poland that opened in 2023

== Airports with commercial passenger service ==
City served	Voivodeship	Location	ICAO	IATA	Airport name	Passengers (2022)	Passengers (2023)	Passengers (2024)	Changes (2022 - 2023)	Changes (2023 - 2024)
Warsaw	Masovian	Okęcie	EPWA	WAW	Warsaw Chopin Airport	14,389,143	18,472,491	21 261 806	28,4%	15,1%
Kraków	Lesser Poland	Balice	EPKK	KRK	Kraków John Paul II International Airport	7,386,496	9,399,281	11 071 697	27,2%	17,8%
Gdańsk	Pomeranian	Rębiechowo	EPGD	GDN	Gdańsk Lech Wałęsa Airport	4,559,480	5 895 934	6 698 533	29,3%	13,6%
Katowice	Silesian	Pyrzowice	EPKT	KTW	Katowice Wojciech Korfanty Airport	4,406,241	5 594 130	6 365 359	27,0%	13,8%
Wrocław	Lower Silesian	Strachowice	EPWR	WRO	Wrocław Airport	2,868,012	3 880 957	4 467 264	35,3%	15,1%
Warsaw	Masovian	Modlin	EPMO	WMI	Warsaw Modlin Airport	3,124,944	3 399 650	2 697 575	8,8%	-20,7%
Poznań	Greater Poland	Ławica	EPPO	POZ	Poznań–Ławica Henryk Wieniawski Airport	2,243,337	2 776 893	3 597 147	23,8%	29,5%
Rzeszów	Subcarpathian	Jasionka	EPRZ	RZE	Rzeszów–Jasionka Airport	683 299	916 209	1 072 593	34,1%	17,1%
Szczecin	West Pomeranian	Goleniów	EPSC	SZZ	Solidarity Szczecin–Goleniów Airport	419,872	477 464	479 119	13,7%	0,3%
Lublin	Lublin	Świdnik	EPLB	LUZ	Lublin Airport	328,516	396 951	424 491	20,8%	6,9%
Bydgoszcz	Kuyavian-Pomeranian	Szwederowo	EPBY	BZG	Bydgoszcz Ignacy Jan Paderewski Airport	247,008	358 230	359 787	45,0%	0,4%
Łódź	Łódź	Lublinek	EPLL	LCJ	Łódź Władysław Reymont Airport	179,926	356 878	431 142	98,3%	20,8%
Olsztyn	Warmian-Masurian	Szymany	EPSY	SZY	Olsztyn-Mazury Airport	111,305	140 444	68 661	26,2%	-51,1%
Warsaw/Radom	Masovian	Radom	EPRA	RDO	Warsaw Radom Airport	-	104 770	112 629	-	7,5%
Zielona Góra	Lubusz	Babimost	EPZG	IEG	Zielona Góra-Babimost Airport	41,543	53,523	82 467	28,8%	54,1%
Total						40,989,122	52,223,805	59 190 270	27,4%	13,3%

== Defunct passenger airports ==
Airports that served commercial passenger traffic in the past.

Airport	Location	Voivodeship or country	IATA	ICAO	Notes
Białystok-Krywlany	Białystok	Podlaskie		EPBK	In 1945, LOT Polish Airlines launched a scheduled route to Warsaw. This service was quickly discontinued.
Częstochowa-Rudniki					In 1983, LOT operated scheduled service for just one season.
Gdańsk-Wrzeszcz					Operated as a civil airport until the opening of the new airport in Rębiechowo in 1974.
Gdynia-Rumia-Zagórze					Scheduled service operated by LOT from 1935 to 1939.
Katowice-Muchowiec	Katowice	Silesian		EPKM	Scheduled service operated by LOT from 1929 to 1958.
Koszalin-Zegrze Pomorskie	Koszalin	West Pomeranian	OSZ	EPKZ	Scheduled and charter service operated by LOT from 1965 to 1991. At its peak, the airport handled 80,000 passengers annually.
Kraków-Rakowice-Czyżyny	Kraków	Lesser Poland			Operated as a civil airport from 1924 until the relocation of the passenger service to Balice in 1963.
Olsztyn-Dajtki					Scheduled service served by Lufthansa (from 1926 to 1939) and LOT (after World War II).
Słupsk-Redzikowo	Słupsk	Pomeranian		EPSK	From 1920 to early 1930s served by German passenger airlines. From 1975 to early 1990s served by LOT.
Szczecin-Dąbie	Szczecin	West Pomeranian			Passenger flights served from 1921 to 1939. At its peak, the airport had direct and indirect connections with 70 cities in Europe. After World War II, served by Polish airlines until 1968.
Warsaw-Mokotów					Served civil passenger traffic from 1920 until the opening of Okęcie Airport in 1934.
Wrocław-Gądów Mały					Scheduled flights operated from 1921 to 1942 and, after World War II, from 1946 until the relocation of all passenger service to Strachowice Airport in 1958.
Polish airports in the territories that belonged to Poland before World War II
Lwów-Lewandówka	Lviv	Ukraine			Passenger flights launched in 1922 and were served by Aero, Aerolloyd/Aerolot and LOT Polish Airlines. Closed in 1929.
Lwów-Skniłów		Ukraine	LWO	UKLL	Established in 1922. Currently located within the borders of Ukraine (see Lviv Danylo Halytskyi International Airport).
Wilno-Porubanek	Vilnius	Lithuania	VNO	EYVI	Established in 1932. Currently located within the borders of Lithuania (see Vilnius Airport).
German airports currently within the borders of Poland that have served passenger traffic only before World War II
Elbląg (German: Elbing)					Opened in 1915. Operated routes to Gdańsk, Szczecin, Königsberg and Moscow, among others.
Gliwice-Trynek (German: Gleiwitz-Trinneck)					Scheduled service began in 1925. Operated routes to many cities in Germany, as well as international destinations like Constantinople.
Gubin (German: Guben)					Since 1929 regular connections to Szczecin, Dresden, Nuremberg, Frankfurt (Oder) and Cottbus, among others.
Jelenia Góra (German: Hirschberg)					Established in 1927. Before World War II served routes to most major German cities.
Malbork (German: Marienburg)					From 1926 to 1934, the airport served seasonal routes to Berlin, Szczecin, Słupsk, Gdańsk, Elbląg, Olsztyn and Königsberg.
Nysa-Radzikowice (German: Neiße-Stephansdorf)					From 1927 to 1939, offered passenger flights to Gliwice, Görlitz, Jelenia Góra and Berlin.
Piła (German: Schneidemühl)					In 1919, a route Berlin–Piła–Gdańsk–Königsberg was launched, however the service proved to be unprofitable and was very quickly abandoned.
Słupsk-Krzekowo (German: Stolp-Kreckow)					From 1920 to 1927, served scheduled connections to Berlin, Gdańsk, Riga, Kaunas and Königsberg.
