= LCJ =

LCJ is a three letter acronym which can refer to:

- The Lord Chief Justice of England and Wales
- Łódź Władysław Reymont Airport in Poland (IATA airport code)
