= Emergency medical services in Poland =

Coordinates: 52.2469°N 21.0086°E

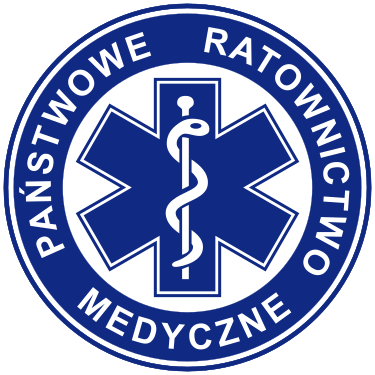
Polish Emergency Medical Service logo

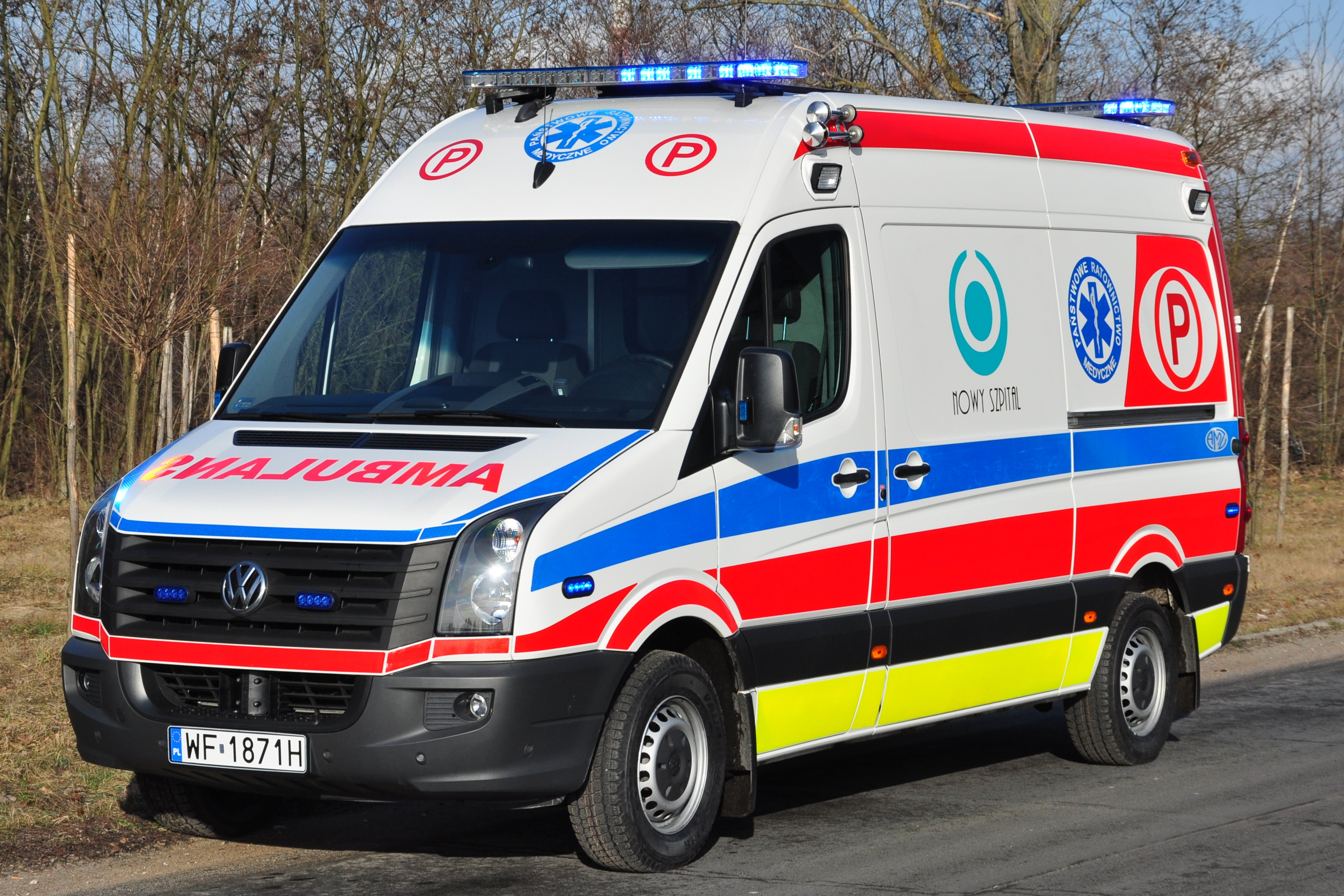
A Volkswagen basic ambulance is used throughout the entire country.

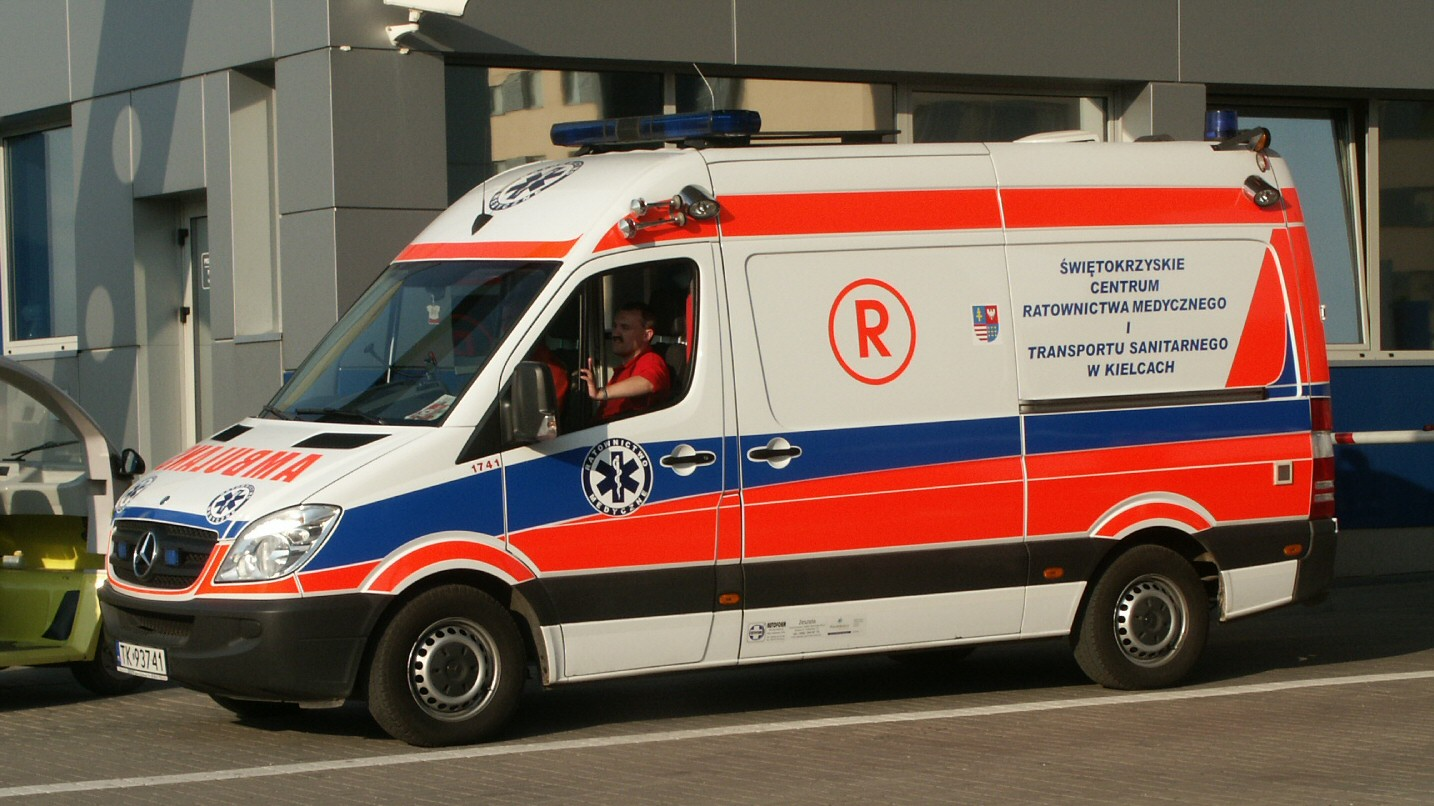
Mercedes-Benz resuscitation ambulance (Type R) used by Polish emergency services

State Medical Rescue (Polish: Państwowe Ratownictwo Medyczne, PRM) in Poland is a system of free public emergency healthcare established by Ustawa o Państwowym Ratownictwie Medycznym (State Medical Rescue Act), including ambulance service and Emergency Departments (EDs). While in Polish public hospitals and clinics NFZ common public insurance is required, PRM medical services in ambulances and EDs are completely free for everyone. Since 2018 emergency ambulances that operates in PRM, that is Polish 112 and 999 emergency numbers, are operated by public entities only (mostly voivodeships and cities dependent organisations).

== Standards ==
=== Operating system ===
At the moment, the operating system of Polish EMS is similar of the Austrian- Franco-German-Spanish delivery model - Integrated EMS of Public Health (IEMS). Paramedics-led team (so called P ambulances) respond to most emergency calls. The paramedic teams are supplemented by gradually diminishing number of physician-led teams (so called S ambulances), which staff includes physician. Emergency medicine has been recognized as a medical specialty since 1999. Due to shortage of specialists in emergency medicine, selected other medical specialists (anesthesiology and intensive care, internal diseases, general surgery, pediatrics, pediatric surgery, orthopaedics and traumatology) are allowed to work as ambulance doctors. All these doctors are often referred to as Emergency Physicians. Unlike the German system, the physicians do not respond in separate vehicles, instead staffing the appropriate types of ambulances directly. Transportation to a hospital may, or may not, be an outcome depending on the decision of the team leader, respectively paramedic or physician. The variation occurs in that the ambulance crew may consist either paramedics or emergency nurses, or some mix of the two roles. Each ambulance team, also has a dedicated driver who is usually also trained paramedic. Paramedic-led ambulances will respond to most emergency calls, as in the Anglo-American model, with physicians being dispatched mostly to those calls where there is a potential critical threat to life.

=== Vehicles and equipment ===
Poland has voluntarily adopted the majority of the specifications for ambulances of European Standard CEN 1789. Ambulances and equipment used do comply with the technical standards outlined. While design and technical standards are voluntarily complied with, there is virtually no compliance with the visual identity standards described in the Standard. There are also no immediate plans to do so. While plans are in place for the restructuring of some aspects of the EMS system, these are mostly related to staffing configurations and deployment, which are not covered by the technical Standard. It appears unlikely that the proposed changes will have any effect on Standard compliance.

=== Training ===
Since 2006, the evolving legal standard of training for Polish paramedics is a three-year bachelor's degree. As an option, those with substantial prior experience may proceed to a degree, following two years of additional study. This program is available in a number of Polish universities, and will completely replace the prior training standard, which consisted of an assortment of short courses. Short courses of various types continue to be offered, but these are now essentially the typical short courses found elsewhere in EMS, including Advanced Cardiac Life Support and Pediatric Advanced Life Support, among others.

== System configuration ==
=== Ratownictwo Medyczne service delivery units ===
- Państwowe Ratownictwo Medyczne (EMS stations)
- Lotnicze Pogotowie Ratunkowe (LPR) (Helicopter Emergency Medical Service, or HEMS )
- Fire Brigade - In the Polish system firefighters provide a level of tiered response to assist Polish EMS in exceptional circumstances, including fires and motor vehicle accidents. The training provided to Polish firefighters is limited to first aid and what might be described as ABC (medicine). As a result, their participation in emergency medical responses is less common than what those in North America would be accustomed to.

=== Vehicles ===
==== Land ambulance ====
The vehicles of the Polish EMS system come in a wide variety of shapes and sizes. As a member of the European Union, Poland has decided to ratify most aspects of the requirements of European standard CEN 1789 for ambulances, as reflected in the Polish EN 1789 (Classes A-C) Standard. The visual identity requirements of the European standard for ambulances are not yet being followed. The three major types of vehicle are:

- The patient transport ambulance (T), which is smaller, conforms to European Class A, and contains fewer staff and less equipment.
- The ambulans specjalistyczny (S) (English: specialised ambulance), is a larger van used for serious emergencies. This unit type is the first choice for response to emergencies that appear to be immediately life-threatening. The crew of this type is minimum two paramedics (or emergency nurses) and a physician. While some CEN 1789 Class B vehicles are still present in the system, the objective is to ultimately ensure that this type of ambulance is always a Class C.
- The ambulans podstawowy (P) (English: basic ambulance), is a van-type ambulance used for less severe emergencies. The crew of a basic ambulance is minimum two paramedics (or emergency nurses). It is currently the most common type. These vehicles conform to the CEN 1789 Class B standard, although often Class C ambulances are seen in this role.

In addition, the system also operates specialty ambulances which are equipped for and dedicated to neonatal transport (Type N), which are not used for any other purpose.

==== Air ambulance ====
Polish Lotnicze Pogotowie Ratunkowe (LPR) operates helicopter air ambulances strategically located in cities throughout Poland. In addition, fixed wing aircraft (Piaggio P180 Avanti) stationed in Warsaw are used for longer range transport. Beginning in the summer of 2011, LPR exclusively operated EC-135.

LPR operated a single AgustaWestland AW109 from 2005 to 2009 when the aircraft was lost (without loss of life) in a training accident and subsequently written off.

High Mountain Rescue (Tatry, TOPR) uses the Polish-built PZL W-3 Sokół, while common Mountains Rescue (GOPR) cooperates with Lotnicze Pogotowie Ratunkowe (LPR) for patients transport.

Air ambulances in Poland

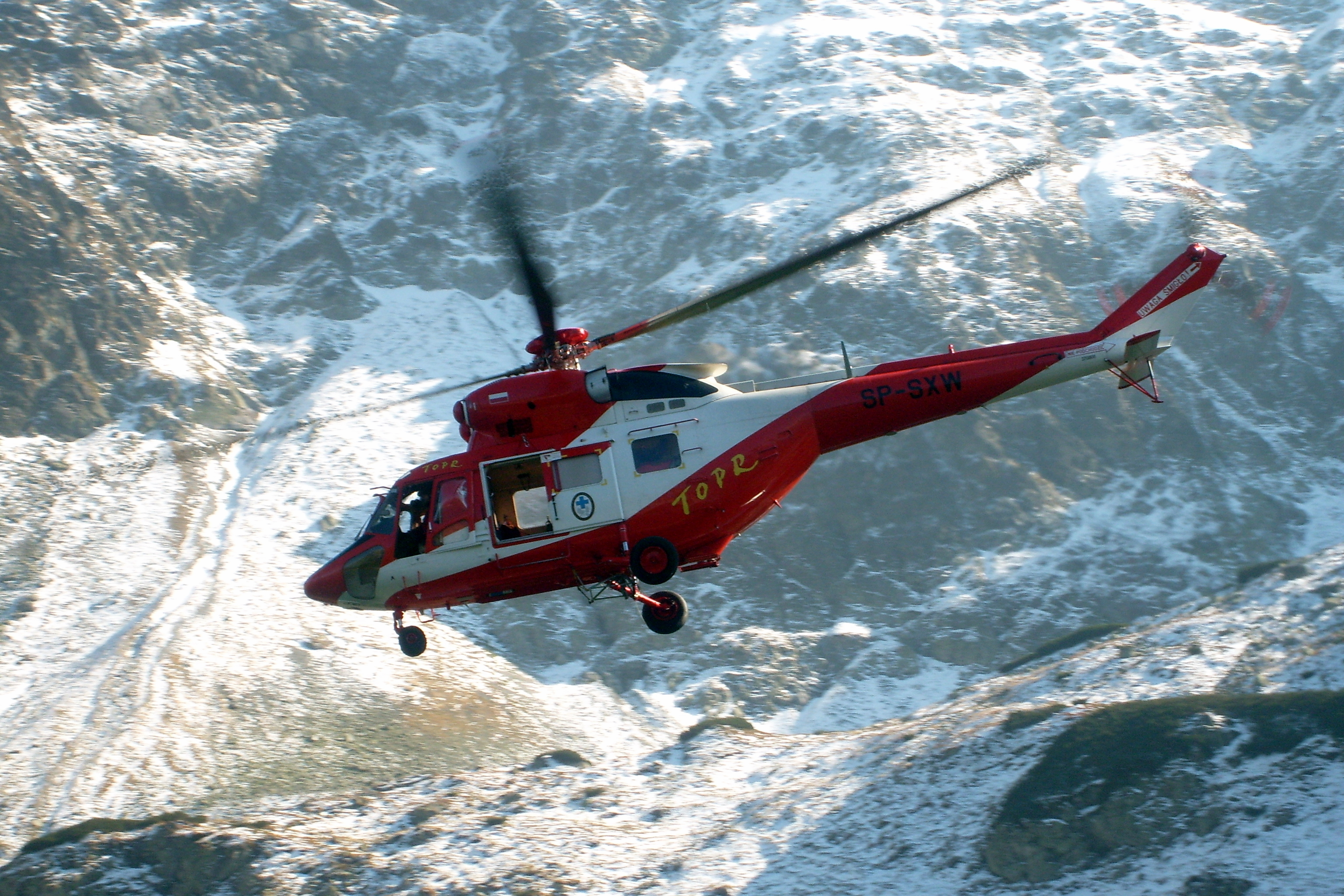
New Polish-built PZL W-3 Sokół used only in mountains by Tatrzańskie Ochotnicze Pogotowie Ratunkowe

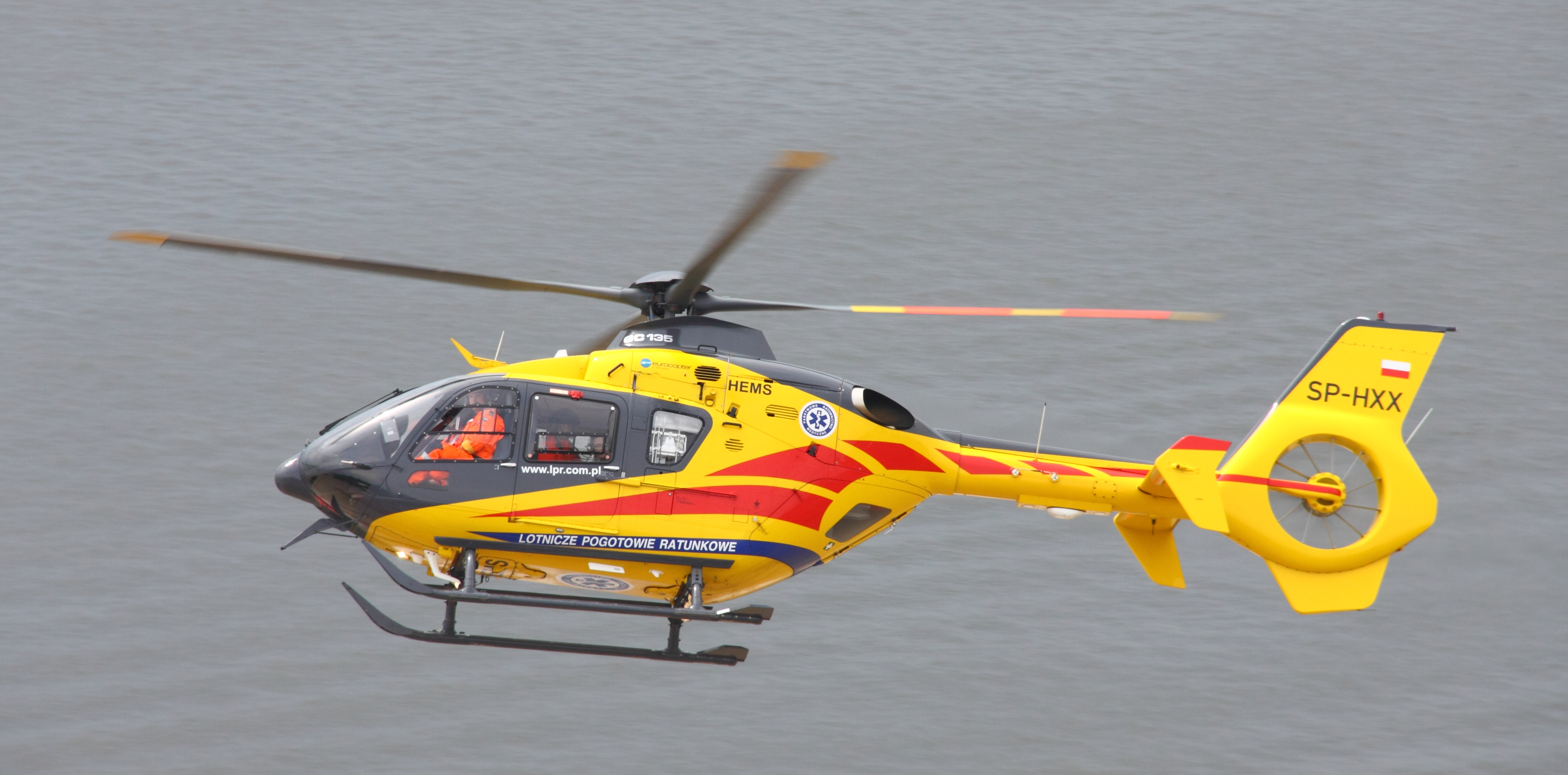
Standard helicopter LPR Eurocopter EC 135

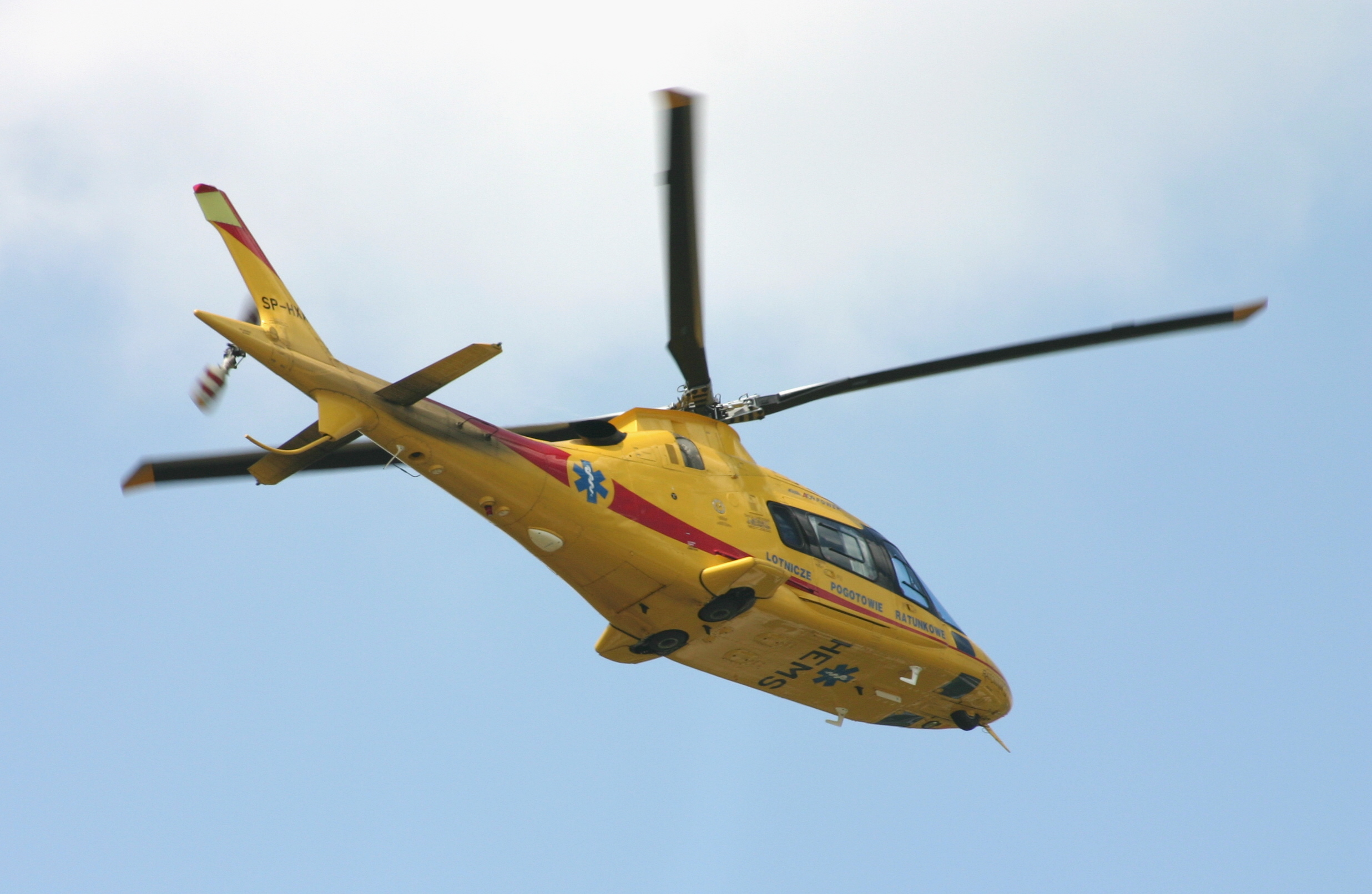
AgustaWestland A109 Power was used 2005–2009.

==== Equipment ====
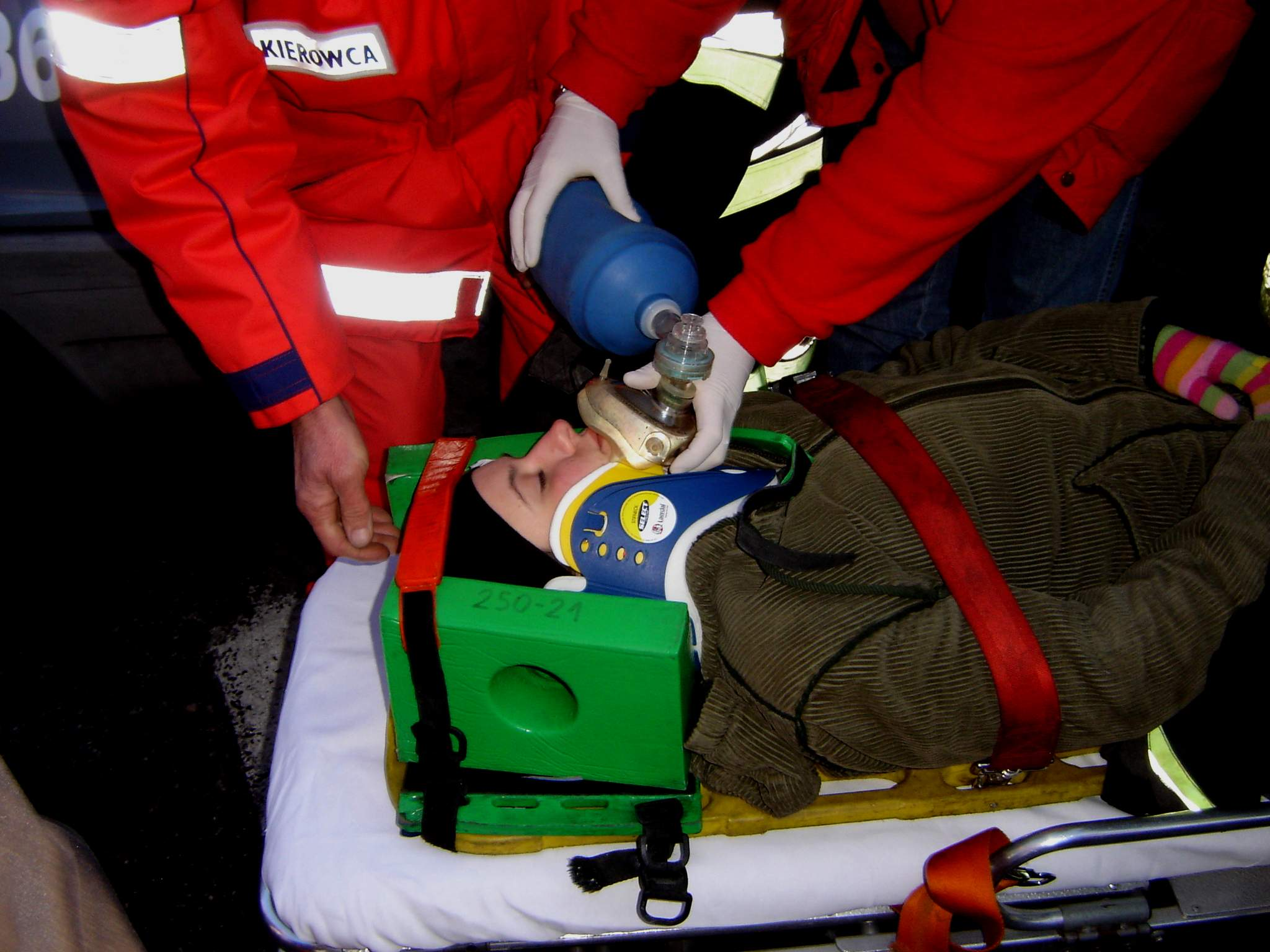
Polish paramedics at work

The basic required equipment of the Type S and Type P ambulances (former Type R and Type W ambulances) is as follows. This equipment is obligatory and represents minimal requirements:

- Basic First Aid kit.
- Dressings and Bandages
- Spinal immobilization equipment such as Cervical collars or spine boards
- Mobile medical ventilator
- Basic diagnostic equipment, such as blood-pressure cuffs
- Portable defibrillator
- ECG monitor
- Equipment for intravenous therapy
- Gurney and blankets
- Flexible stretcher, also called a Reeves stretcher
- Rigid or collapsible transport chair (called a stair chair in the United States)
- Rescue equipment

=== Communications ===
All ambulances in Poland are dispatched from centralized regional dispatch centers (Polish: Centrum Powiadamiania Ratunkowego)(CPR). The traditional standardized emergency telephone number for ambulances in Poland in the POTS telephone system is 999. The standard European emergency number, 112, also works in Poland, including mobile systems, and is gradually replacing 999. Calls are then triaged by interview process, and the closest and most correct type of ambulance resource is sent to the call.

E112 is a location-enhanced version of 112. The telecom operator transmits the location information to the emergency centre. The EU Directive E112 (2003) requires mobile phone networks to provide emergency services with whatever information they have about the location a mobile call was made. This directive is based on the American Federal Communications Commission's Enhanced 911 ruling in 2001.

== System changes ==
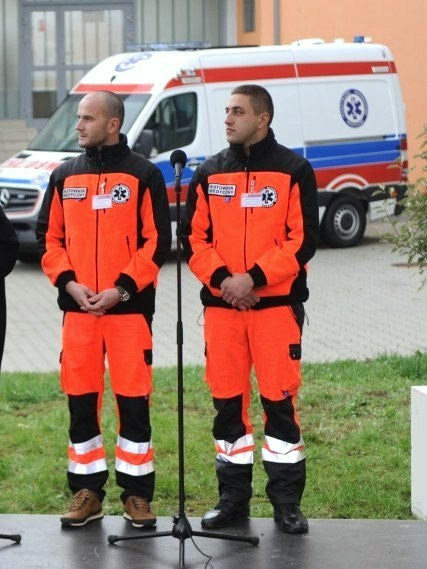
Polish paramedics in uniform

=== Previous systems ===
In Poland before 2006 emergency ambulances teams were classified into two types, type R (now S), and type W (P), which are staffed as follows:

- Ambulance type R - 3 people including a physician (most often anesthetist), 1 paramedic/nurse a driver-paramedic.
- Ambulance type W - 3 including a physician, 1 paramedic/nurse, and a driver-paramedic.

=== Current system ===
The government of Poland has mandated significant changes within the EMS system. These will include more paramedic-led ambulances and less physician-led ambulances. In the proposed system Polish paramedics will perform ALS skills without a physician present. These changes are proposed to occur in 2010, with the acquisition of some 600 new ambulances by the Polish government; the result of industrial action by Polish paramedics. Patient transport ambulances (Type T) and neonatal transport ambulances (Type N) will remain in their current configurations. The new types of ambulances and staffing patterns will be as follows:

- The ambulans specjalistyczny (S) (English: specialist ambulance) is a larger van used for serious emergencies. This is used only for potentially life-threatening responses. Standard personnel staffing consists of a doctor (with emergency medicine specialization), a paramedic (or specialized nurse), and a driver/orderly. The vehicle used will be in all cases a CEN 1789 Class C ambulance. The new ambulance category, Type S replaced the Type R ambulance in the "More ALS" category.
- The ambulans podstawowy (P) (English: basic ambulance; in EMS squads called also paramedic ambulance) is a standard van-type ambulance used for emergency responses when a Type S unit is unavailable, and for lower priority emergency calls. Such vehicles will not be used for consultations, or for non-emergency transport. Standard staffing of personnel will consist of a paramedics (or specialized nurses) and a driver-Paramedic orderly. The new category, Type P will replace the old Type W vehicle configuration. Type P ambulances will conform to, at minimum, CEN 1789 Class B, with the option at a local level to use Class C vehicles instead.

=== Primary health care and non-emergency medical transport ===
In Poland, ambulances are also used for non-emergency transport, such as:

- Ambulance N - neonatal transport team - pediatric staff
- Ambulance OL - physician traveling team - 3 people including a physician, Nurse-EMT, and a driver-EMT
- Ambulance T - outgoing transport team, - 2 people including EMT-nurses, and a driver-EMT
