= El Tuqui Airport =

- IATA: OVL; ICAO: SCOV

Summary
- Airport type: Public
- Serves: Ovalle, Chile
- Elevation AMSL: 1,100 ft / 335 m
- Coordinates: 30°33′35″S 71°10′35″W

Map
- Location of El Tuqui Airport in Chile

Runways
| Direction | Length | | Surface |
| Direction | m | ft | Surface |
|---|---|---|---|
| 04/22 | 797 | 2,615 | Asphalt |
- Source: Landings.com Google Maps GCM

El Tuqui Airport (Spanish: Aeropuerto El Tuqui), (IATA: OVL, ICAO: SCOV) is an airport serving Ovalle, a city in the Coquimbo Region of Chile.

The airport sits on a wide ridge 85 metres (279 ft) above the Limarí River elevation. There are dropoffs into the valley at each end and to the west of the runway.

Runway length does not include an additional 380 metres (1,250 ft) displaced threshold on Runway 22.

== See also ==
- Transport in Chile
- List of airports in Chile
