= Washington–Warren Airport =

Public airport in Washington, North Carolina

- IATA: OCW; ICAO: KOCW; FAA LID: OCW

Summary
- Owner/Operator: City of Washington
- Serves: Washington, North Carolina
- Opened: July 1942
- Elevation AMSL: 37.4 ft / 11.4 m
- Coordinates: 35°34′13.7″N 77°02′59.3″W
- Website: https://flykocw.com/
- Interactive map of Washington–Warren Airport

Runways
Direction	Length		Surface
Direction	ft	m	Surface
05/23	5,000	1,524	Asphalt
17/35	5,000	1,524	Asphalt

Washington–Warren Airport (IATA: OCW, ICAO: KOCW, FAA LID: OCW) is a public, city-owned airport serving the city of Washington and Beaufort County in North Carolina. The airport is located 2 miles (3.1 km) north of downtown Washington.

== History ==
The airport was opened in July 1942 as a military airfield. In 2012, a storm severely damaged the original terminal. When the new terminal was opened in 2015, the airport was renamed Washington–Warren Airport after former North Carolina congresswoman Lindsay Carter Warren.

In early 2022, the airport received a $20 million state grant for a new landing system and improvements to runways and taxiways.

The airport has held an annual air show called the Wheels and Wings Cruise-In & Fly-In since 2021 to raise money for the University of North Carolina Jaycee Burn Clinic. Since 2022, Washington–Warren Airport has partnered with Virginia-based drone company Xelevate to host an annual drone technology conference called the Washington-Warren Air & Drone Show. The inaugural event was held on December 17, 2022, to commemorate the 119th anniversary of the Wright brothers' first flight.

== Services ==
The airport does not have any scheduled operations, instead serving corporate air traffic and frequently serving as a stopover point for general aviation flights between New York and Miami. It also frequently used as a stopover point for travelers from the Washington DC area to MCAS Cherry Point, MCB Camp Lejeune, Seymour Johnson AFB, CGAS Elizabeth City, and Naval Station Norfolk.
