= Szymany, Szczytno County =

Szymany
- Village
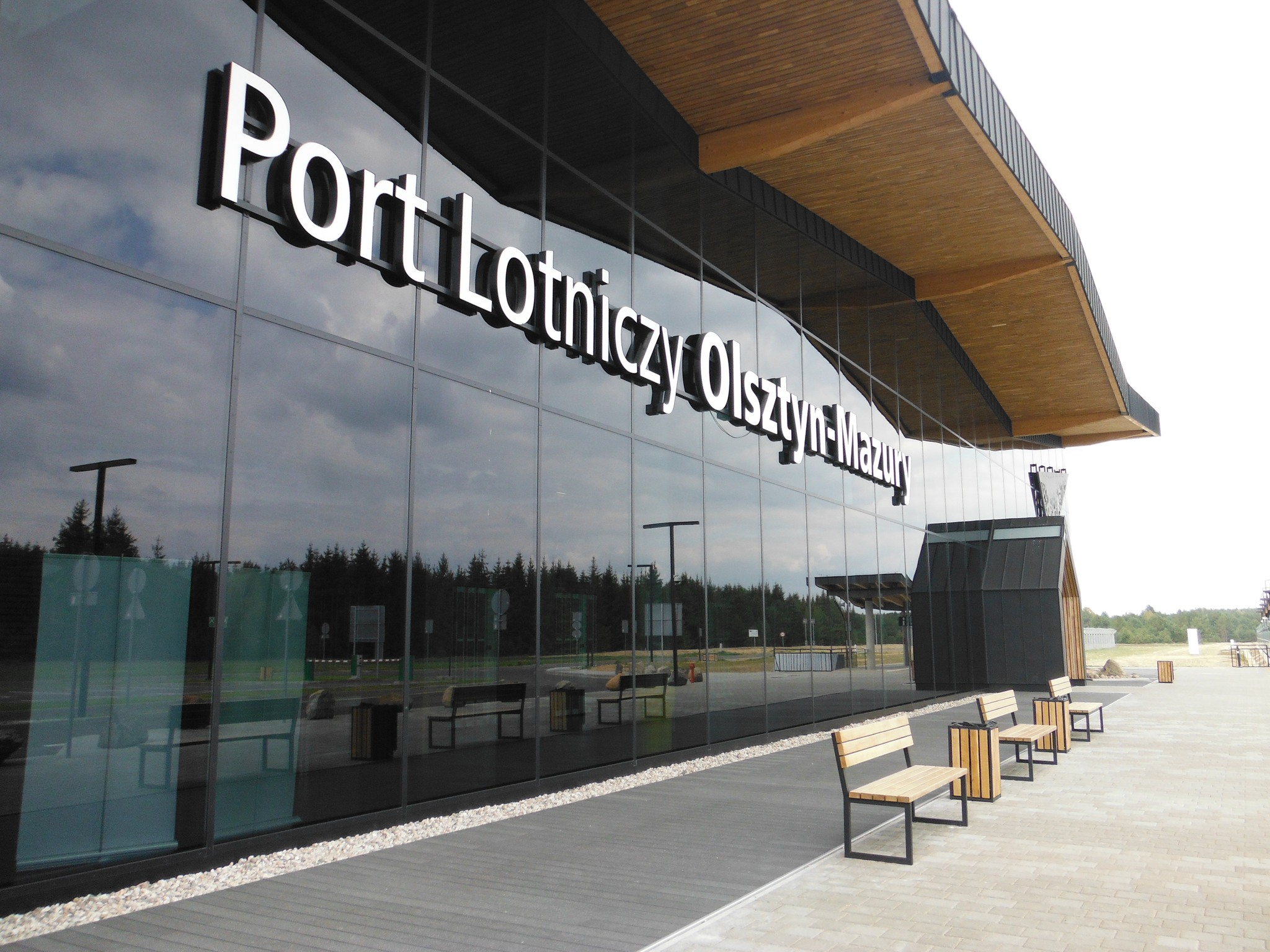
- Olsztyn-Mazury Airport

- Location within Poland
- Coordinates: 53°29′7″N 20°57′3″E
- Country: Poland
- Voivodeship: Warmian-Masurian
- County: Szczytno
- Gmina: Szczytno

Population
  - Total: 550
- Time zone: UTC+1 (CET)
  - Summer (DST): UTC+2 (CEST)
- Vehicle registration: NSZ

Szymany (Polish: [ʂɨˈmanɨ]; German: Gross Schiemanen) is a village in the administrative district of Gmina Szczytno, within Szczytno County, Warmian-Masurian Voivodeship, in north-eastern Poland. It is located in the historic region of Masuria.

The Olsztyn-Mazury Airport and the Szymany and Szymany Lotnisko train stations are located in the village. In the village there is a historic church of Our Lady of Częstochowa.

== History ==
The village dates back to 1682. It was located on a route connecting Warsaw and Königsberg. From 1701 it was part of the Kingdom of Prussia, and from 1871 to 1945 also part of Germany. In the late 19th century it was inhabited by 737 people, Polish Protestants. As a result of the Treaty of Versailles the 1920 East Prussian plebiscite was organized on 11 July 1920 under the control of the League of Nations, which resulted in 773 votes to remain in Germany and none for Poland, which just regained independence in 1918.

During World War II, the German afministration operated a forced labour camp in the village. In April 1943, Polish partisans from the Home Army pelted the airport with grenades and burned two hangars.
