= Olpoi Airport =

Olpoi Airport North West Santo Airport
- IATA: OLJ; ICAO: NVSZ

Summary
- Airport type: Public
- Location: Espiritu Santo, Vanuatu
- Elevation AMSL: 10 m / 33 ft
- Coordinates: 14°52′54″S 166°33′29″E

Map
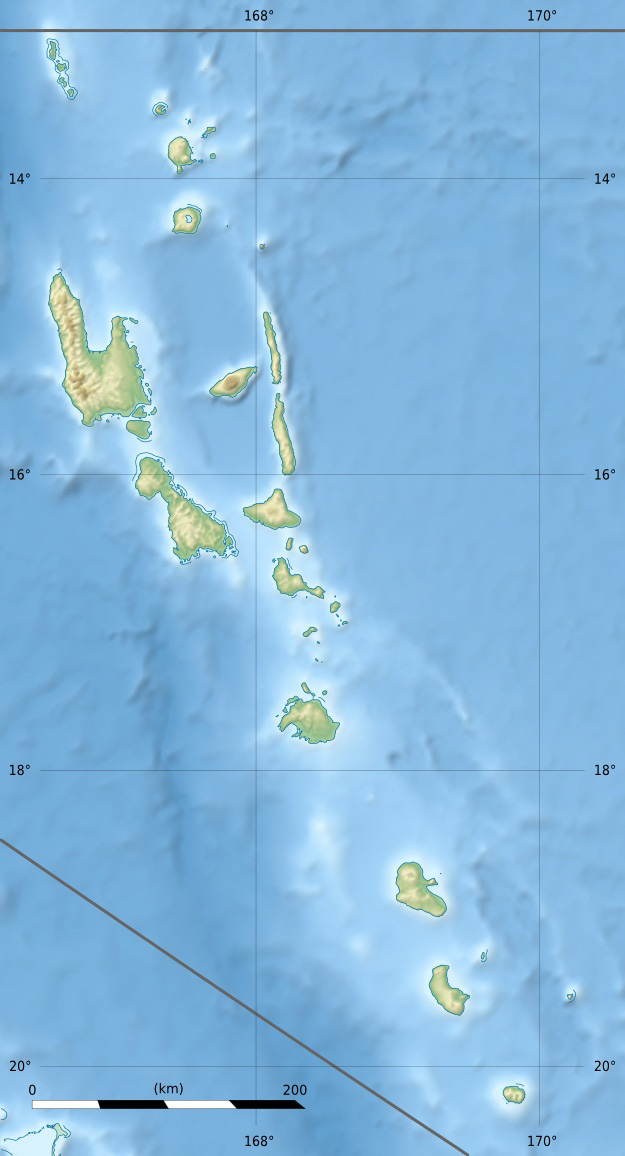
- Location of airport in Vanuatu

Runways
Direction	Length		Surface
Direction	m	ft	Surface
17/35	1,200	3,937	Grass
- Source: FlightStats, GCM, STV

Olpoi Airport (IATA: OLJ, ICAO: NVSZ), also known as North West Santo Airport, is an airport in Olpoi on Espiritu Santo, Vanuatu.
