= Oakdale Airport =

- IATA: ODC; ICAO: none; FAA LID: O27

Summary
- Airport type: Public
- Operator: City of Oakdale
- Location: Oakdale, California
- Elevation AMSL: 234 ft / 71.3 m
- Coordinates: 37°45′23″N 120°48′01″W

Map
- Location of airport in California

Runways
Direction	Length		Surface
Direction	ft	m	Surface
10/28	3,020	920	Asphalt

Oakdale Airport (IATA: ODC, FAA LID: O27) is a public airport located three miles (4.8 km) southeast of the central business district (CBD) of Oakdale, a city in Stanislaus County, California, USA. The airport covers 117 acres (47 ha) and has one runway. It is mostly used for general aviation.
