= Łódź Władysław Reymont Airport =

Lodz Władysław Reymont Airport Central Poland Port Lotniczy Łódź im. Władysława Reymonta

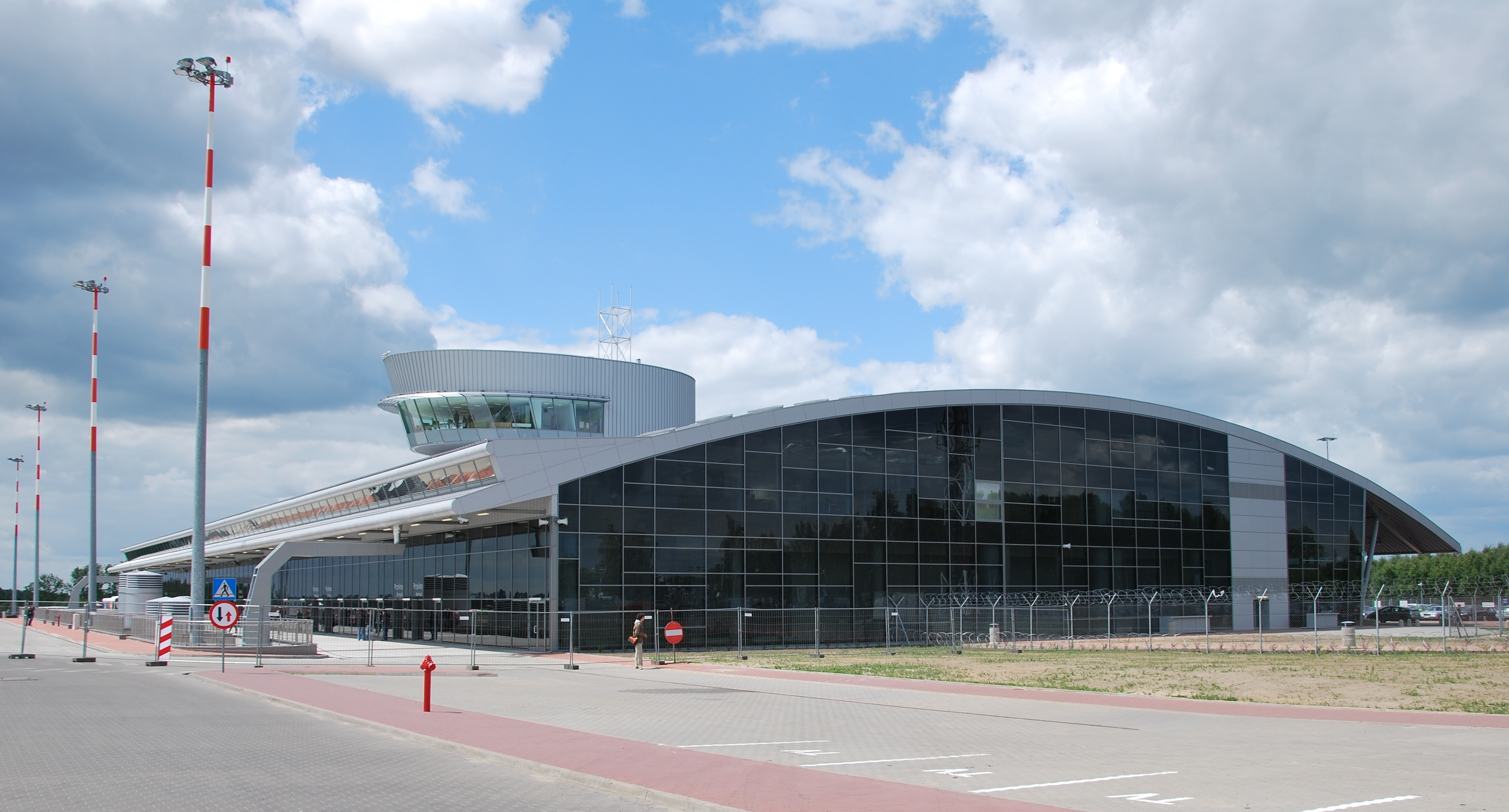
- IATA: LCJ; ICAO: EPLL

Summary
- Airport type: Public
- Operator: Port lotniczy Łódź im. Władysława Reymonta Spółka z o.o.
- Serves: Łódź
- Elevation AMSL: 185 m / 607 ft
- Coordinates: 51°43′19″N 019°23′53″E
- Website: lodz-airport.pl/en

Map
- Location of airport in Poland

Runways
Direction	Length		Surface
Direction	m	ft	Surface
07L/25R	2,500	8,202	Asphalt
07R/25L	700	2,297	Grass

Statistics (2023)
- Passengers: 356,878
- Source: EUROCONTROL; Statistics from the Civil Aviation Office

Lodz Airport Central Poland (IATA: LCJ, ICAO: EPLL), formerly known as Łódź-Lublinek Airport, is a regional airport in central Poland, located approximately 6 km (3.7 mi) southwest of Łódź city center. Łódź ranked 8th among Polish airports in 2013 in passenger numbers. The airport has been in operation since 13 September 1925 and has recently undergone a number of upgrades, enabling it to handle services by low cost airlines to destinations in Europe.

== History ==
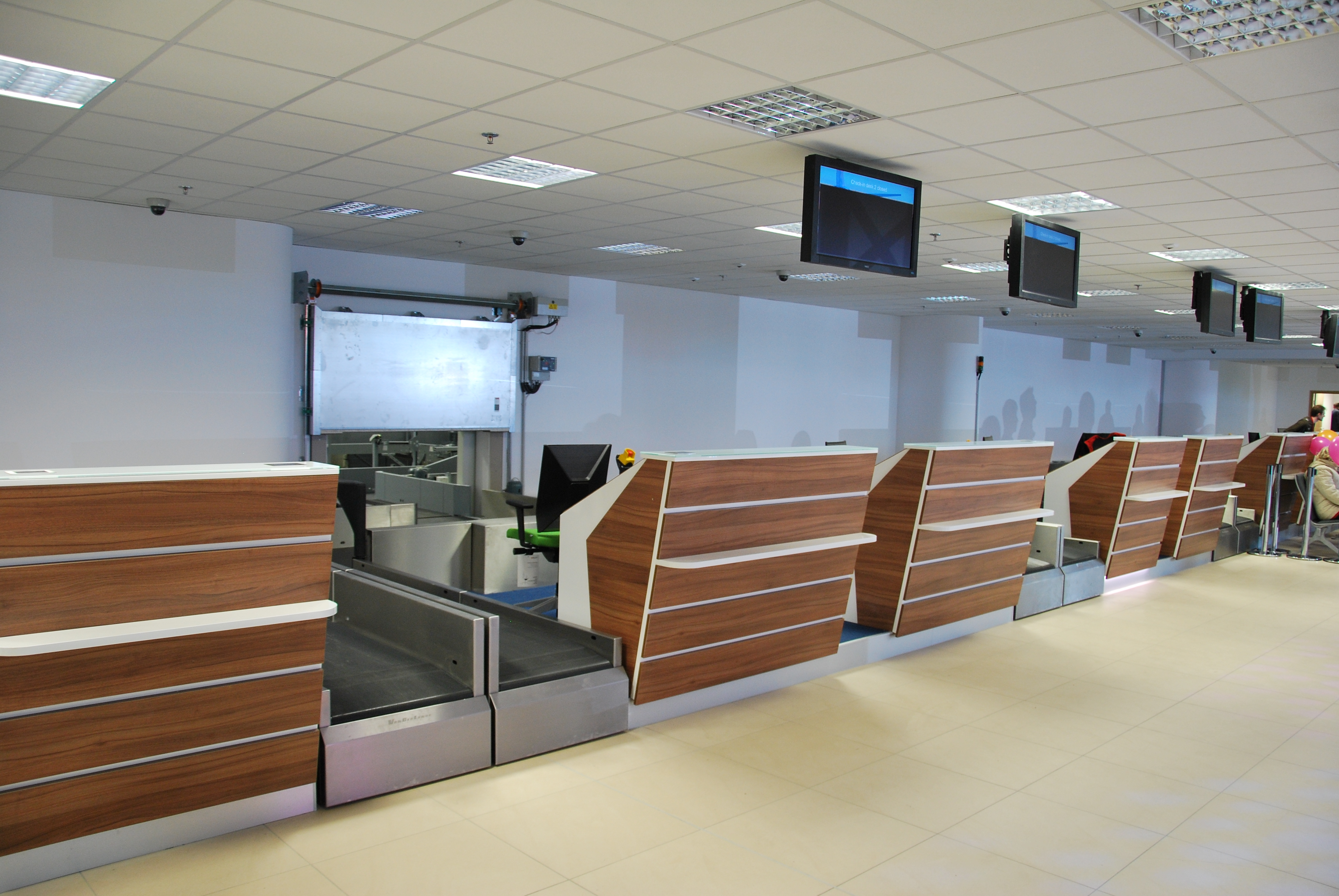
Check-in desks

=== Early years ===
Łódź Airport opened on 13 September 1925. During World War II, the German occupying forces improved the airport for military use, by building a concrete 1,200 m (3,937 ft) runway. In the immediate postwar years, the airport was a key transport hub, but that role diminished by the 1950s with the development of Warsaw airport. By the end of the decade, regular passenger connections to Łódź were suspended. Efforts to restart passenger traffic were undertaken in the 1990s.

In 1997, a new passenger terminal (capacity approx. 50,000/year) was opened. Since 1997, Port Lotniczy Łódź-Lublinek sp. z o.o. (Lodz-Lublinek Airport LLC) has been the operator of the airport, changing its name in 2007 to Port Lotniczy Łódź im. Władysława Reymonta Sp. z o.o. (LODZ WLADYSLAW REYMONT AIRPORT LLC).

=== Development since the 2000s ===
On 31 October 2002, an ILS/DME System (instrument landing system/distance measuring equipment) was installed at the airport.

In September 2005, the runway was extended from 1,443 m (4,734 ft) to 2,100 m (6,890 ft) in order to accommodate larger aircraft, such as the Boeing 737. On 28 October 2005, a new passenger terminal, Terminal 2 (capacity approx. about 300,000/year) was opened. Two days later, the first Boeing 737 in the history of the Łódź Airport landed. On 19 January 2007, the runway extension to 2,500 m (8,202 ft) was put into use.

In June 2012, the brand-new Terminal 3 with a capacity for 1.5–2 million passengers per year was opened. The capacity is more than 5 times that of the old terminal. Terminal 2 was dismantled and sold to Radom for their new airport. The airport has been renamed after the celebrated 20th century Polish writer and the winner of the 1924 Nobel Prize in Literature, Władysław Reymont.

After the A2 motorway between Łódź and Warsaw opened in 2012, which reduced the travel time between the two cities to about one hour, the Łódź airport has faced tougher competition from the two Warsaw airports (Warsaw Chopin and Warsaw-Modlin). As a consequence, the number of passengers using it has fallen. The airport no longer has any domestic destinations since the bankruptcy of OLT Express in July 2012, which had also planned a number of international services. Due to low passengers numbers, Łódź Airport has been cited as an example of inefficient use of EU subsidies.

In October 2019, Lufthansa terminated their short-lived route to Munich Airport.

== Airlines and destinations ==
The following airlines operate regular scheduled and charter flights at Łódź Władysław Reymont Airport:

Airlines	Destinations
Corendon Airlines	Charter: Antalya
Enter Air	Seasonal charter: Antalya, Burgas,
Ryanair	Alicante, Bergamo, Birmingham, Charleroi, Dublin, London–Stansted, Málaga
Smartwings Poland	Seasonal charter: Antalya, Bodrum, Tirana

== See also ==
- List of airports in Poland
- Air ambulances in Poland

== Bibliography ==
- Wiśniewski, Szymon (2017). "Łódź in the Regional and National Transportation System" (PDF). Space-Society-Economy. 19 (19): 65–86. doi:10.18778/1733-3180.19.04. ISSN 1733-3180.
