= Koszalin-Zegrze Pomorskie Airport =

Koszalin-Zegrze Pomorskie Airport Port Lotniczy Koszalin-Zegrze Pomorskie
- IATA: OSZ; ICAO: EPKZ

Summary
- Airport type: Public
- Serves: Koszalin, Poland
- Elevation AMSL: 73 m / 240 ft
- Coordinates: 54°02′32″N 16°15′51″E

Map
- Location of airport in Poland

Runways
Direction	Length		Surface
Direction	m	ft	Surface
25	2,500	0	Concrete

Statistics (2007 +/- change from 2006)
- Passengers: 0
- Cargo (in tons): 0
- Takeoffs/Landings: 0
- Source: Polish AIP at EUROCONTROL

Koszalin-Zegrze Pomorskie Airport (IATA: OSZ, ICAO: EPKZ) was a domestic passenger airport serving Koszalin. Its most popular flights include domestic and charter routes to Kołobrzeg, a seaside resort. The runways spans a length of 2,400 meters long and is 60 meters wide. The airport is connected to the Koszalin city by expressway.

== History ==
In 1979, the airport served 85,853 passengers, and in 1986–1991, on average served 50–55 thousand passengers annually. Former destinations included Katowice.

== Airport infrastructure ==
The passenger terminal was demolished in the 1990s. There is no infrastructure for passenger services at the airport.
