= List of defunct airlines of Spain =

This is a list of defunct airlines of Spain.

Airline	Image	IATA	ICAO	Callsign	Commenced operations	Ceased operations	Notes
A
AB Bluestar					2000	2000	Renamed AeBal. Operated Boeing 717-200
AeBal-Spanair Link		DF	ABH	AIR BALEAR	1999	2008	Renamed Quantum Air
Aerlyper					1965	1979	
Aeroflete		FW		FLETE	1968	1974	Operated Douglas DC-3, Douglas DC-4
Aeromarket Express			ARM	AMEX	1988	1992	Operated Douglas DC-3
Aeronaves La Dorada			ALD	DORADA	?	?	
Aeronova		UX	OVA	AERONOVA	1996	2016	Rebranded as Air Europa Express. Operated ATR 42, Fairchild Metro III
Aeropublic			PUB	AEROPUBLIC	?	?	
Aerotaxis Axa			AXT	AEROAXA	?	?	
Aerotransporte de España					1977	1984	Operated Douglas DC-3, Douglas DC-6, Fairchild FH-227
Aerovento			OTO	OTO	1997	2002	Operated Aérospatiale Corvette, Beech King Air C90, Swearingen Metro II
Aeroway			AWY	AEROWEE	?	?	
Air Alboran			AHB	ALHAMBRA	?	?	
Air Andalucia					2003	2005	
Air Asturias					2006	2007	
Air Atlantic		QD			1992	1999	Operated Beech 1900D, Swearingen Merlin IV
Air Cargo Spain		MW			1983	1987	Operated Douglas DC-8, Swearingen Merlin IV
Air Canarias			CAN	AIRCAN	?	?	
Air Catalunia					1985	1986	Operated Swearingen Merlin IV
Air Catalunya					2001	2002	Operated Fairchild Metro III
Air Comet		A7	MPD	RED COMET	1996	2009	
Air Condal			JID	CONDAL	1974	1979	Operated HS 748
Air Cordoba			CDB	AIR CORDOBA	?	?	
Air España					1984	1986	Renamed Air Europa
Air Este			EET	AESTE	2006	2009	Established as Fly LPI. Operated Saab 340, Swearingen Merlin IV
Air Europa Canarias			GCE	EUROPA CANARIAS	1999	2001	Regional airline. Operated Boeing 737-300
Air Europa Express		UX	PMI	EUROPA	1996	2001	
Air Madrid		NM	DRD	ALADA AIR	2003	2006	
Air Pack Express			PCK		2004	2008	Operated Cessna Caravan
Air Plus Comet					1996	2007	Renamed Air Comet
Air Spain		JA		AIR SPAIN	1966	1975	
AirClass Airways			VSG	VISIG	2003	2008	
AirSur		KG	NCR	NACAR	1986	1991	Established as Canafrica Transportes Aereos. Operated BAe 146, Douglas DC-9, MD-83
Alaire			ALR		2001	2017	Operated HS 748, Cessna Cargomaster
Ándalus Líneas Aéreas		EA	ANU	ANDALUS	2008	2010	
Andalusair			AAN	ANDALUSAIR	1999	2000	Operated Airbus A320-231
Arcadia					1999	1999	Operated DC-10-30
ARM Palfe			ARM	AMEX	1989	1999	Established as Aeromarket Express. Operated Douglas DC-3, Piper Aztec
Artac Aviación			AVS	ARTAC	2002	2006	Operated Swearingen Merlin IV
ASL Airlines Spain		PV	PNR	SKYJET	1987	2018	Formerly called PAN Air.
Atlantic Airways			RCU	AIR COURIER	1999	2003	Established as Air Atlantic (Spain) in 1992
Audeli Air			ADI	AUDELI	1987	2005	Renamed Gestair Airlines
Aviaco		AO	AYC	AVIACO	1948	1999	Merged with Iberia
Azimut			AZT	AZIMUT	1997	1997	
B
Barair			BAI	BARAI	?	?	
Basaer					1996	2000	Operated Douglas DC-7
BCM Airlines		TY	BCM	BCM AIRLINES	1996	1998	Operated Airbus A320-231
Binter Mediterraneo		AX	BIM	BINTER	1988	2001	Bought by Air Nostrum
Boreal Aviación			BRV	BOREAL AVIACION	1999	2030	Operated Airbus A320-231
Bravo Airlines		BQ	BBV	BRAVO	2004	2008	
C
CAETA (Compañía Anonima Española de Transporte Aéreo)					1939	1940	Merged into Lineas Aereas Postales Españolas
CANA (Compañía Auxiliar De Navegación Aérea)					1947	1949	Founded by Ultano Kindelan. Operated Miles Aerovan, Miles Gemini, Miles Messenger, Siebel Si 204
Canarias Aeronautica					2008	2010	Renamed Canaryfly
Canarias Air Cargo			CCS	CANARIAS CARGO	1995	2000	Operated Douglas DC-8
Canarias Regional Air		FW	CNM	CANARIAS AIR	1998	2000	
Cargosur		OW	OWS	CARGOSUR	1987	1995	Merged with Iberia. Operated Douglas DC-8-62
Centennial Airlines		BE	CNA	CANNON	1993	1996	
CLASSA (Concesionaria de Líneas Aéreas Subvencionadas)				CLASSA	1929	1931	Merged with LAPE
Clickair		XG	CLI	CLICKJET	2006	2009	Merged with Vueling
Cosmo Airlines			KOM	BLACKEAGLE	2012	2012	Operated Airbus A320-200
CTA (Canafrica Transportes Aereos)		KG	NCR	NACAR	1985	1987	Renamed Canafrica. Operated Douglas DC-8, MD-83
Cygnus Air		XG	RGN	CYGNUS AIR	1998	2007	
D
Delta Aviation			DET	DELTA AVIATION	?	?	
Delta Jet			DEJ	DELTA JET	?	?	
Drenair			DRS		1986	2003	
E
Euro Continental Air			ECN	EURO CONTINENTAL	2004	2006	Operated Swearingen Merlin IV
Euro First Air - Canarias Cargo			EFA	CARGOCANARIAS	2000	2000	Cargo airline
European Air Cargo					1992	2002	
European Regions Airlines		EA	EUA	GOLDEN ANGEL	1998	2000	Operated Embraer 145
Evelop Airlines		E9	EVE	EVELOP	2013	2021	Merged with Orbest to form Iberojet. Operated Airbus A320-200, Airbus A330-200, Airbus A330-300, Airbus A330-900
F
Flyant			FYA	FLYANT	2006	2008	Cargo airline
Flylink Express					2003	2009	
FlySur					2008	2008	TAER Andalus was renamed Flysur in the last months of operation.
Futura International Airways		FH	FUA	FUTURA	1989	2008	
G
Gadair European Airlines		GP	GDR	GADAIR	2007	2009	
Gestair Cargo		XG	RGN	REGIONAL LINEAS	2007	2013	Renamed Cygnus Air for the second time.
Girjet		8G	GJT	BANJET	2003	2008	
GoodFly					2011	2013	Operated Beech 1900D, Fairchild Metro III, Fokker 50, MD-87, Saab 340B
H
Helitt Líneas Aéreas		H9	HTH	ALBORAN	2011	2014	
Hispania Airways					2011	2012	
Hispania Líneas Aéreas		HI	HSL	Sunbeam	1982	1989	
Hola Airlines		H5	HOA	HOLA	2002	2010	
I
Iberworld		TY	IWD	IBERWORLD	1998	2011	
IMD Airways					2008	2009	
Intermediación Aérea			IEA		1997	2005	
Islas Airways		IF	ISW	PINTADERA	2003	2012	
L
LagunAir		N7	LGA	LAGUNAIR	2003	2008	
LAPE				LAPE	1932	1939	Expropriated
Líneas Aéreas Canarias		L9	LCN	LAC	1985	1990	Bought by Meridiana Air
Líneas Aéreas Navarras					1994	1997	
LTE International Airways		XO	LTE	FUN JET	1987	2008	
M
Melilla Airlines					2013		
Meridiana S.A.					1991	1992	
Mint Airways		IM	MIC	MINT AIRWAYS	2009	2012	
N
Navegacion y Servicios Aéreos Canarios		ZN	NAY	NAYSA	1969	2018	Merged into Binter Canarias
Nort Jet		EL	ENJ	Nortjet	1989	1992	
O
Oasis Airlines		OB	AAN	Oasis	1986	1996	
Orbest Orizonia Airlines		TY	IWD	IBERWORLD	2011	2013	
Orionair			ORI	RED GLOBE	2004	2008	
P
PauknAir		PV		PAUKNAIR	1995	1998	
Plaza Servicios Aéreos					2006	2008	
Prima Air					1996	1996	
Pronair			PRJ	PRONAIR	2007	2009	
Pyrenair					2006	2011	
Q
Quantum Air		QO	QTM	QUANTUM	2008	2010	Initially named Aerolíneas de Baleares
R
Rioja Airlines				Rioja Airlines	2007	2007	
Ryjet		W2	RYJ	RYJET	1999	2012	
S
Saicus Air			FYA		2008	2010	Cargo airline
Sky Service Aviation			SKT		1992	2005	Merged with Gestair
South Atlantic Airways			HRC		2000	2001	
Spanair		JK	JKK	SPANAIR	1986	2012	
Spantax		BX	BXS	SPANTAX	1959	1988	Merged into Spanair
T
Tadair			TDC	Tadair	1990	2003	
TAE – Trabajos Aéreos y Enlaces			JK	TAE	1966	2000	
TASSA – Trabajos Aéreos del Sahara	Eine Douglas DC-7 der TASSA		KI	TASSA	1961	1965	
Thomas Cook Airlines Balearics		H5	CTB	SUNNYHEART	2017	2021	
Top Fly			TLY		1998	2009	
Transeuropa			TR	TRANSEUROPA	1965	1982	
U
Unión Aérea Española					1925	1929	Merged with Concesionaria de Líneas Aéreas Subvencionadas (CLASSA)
Universair					1986	1992	
V
Viva Air		FV	VIV	VIVA	1988	1998	
Volar Airlines			DRS		2001	2005	

== See also ==
- List of airlines of Spain
