= Agoncillo =

Agoncillo may refer to:

== Places ==
- Agoncillo, La Rioja, a municipality in La Rioja, Spain
  - CD Agoncillo, Spanish football team based in Agoncillo
  - Logroño-Agoncillo Airport
- Agoncillo, Batangas, a municipality in the Province of Batangas, Philippines

== Other uses ==
- Agoncillo (surname)
