= Rioja Airlines =

Spanish charter airline

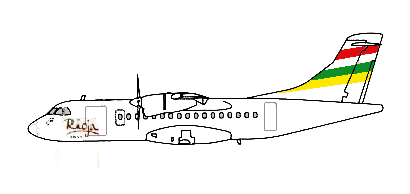
IATA	ICAO	Call sign
-	-	Rioja Airlines
- Founded: 2007
- Ceased operations: 2007
- Operating bases: Recajo
- Focus cities: Alicante, Sevilla and Málaga
- Headquarters: Logroño-Agoncillo Airport

Rioja Airlines was a Spanish charter airline based in La Rioja region.

== Company history ==
Rioja Airlines was founded in 2007 by Riojano entrepreneurs. It began operations from the Logroño-Agoncillo Airport in Recajo with flights to Alicante, Sevilla and Málaga.

Its maiden flight was on 24 June 2007 with a flight to Sevilla, but the airline soon ran into financial difficulties and ceased operations only three months later on 9 September 2007. Creditors filed lawsuits against the airline even after it ceased operating.

== Fleet ==
- 2 ATR 42-400 (on lease)

== See also ==
- List of defunct airlines of Spain
