= Universair =

Spanish airline

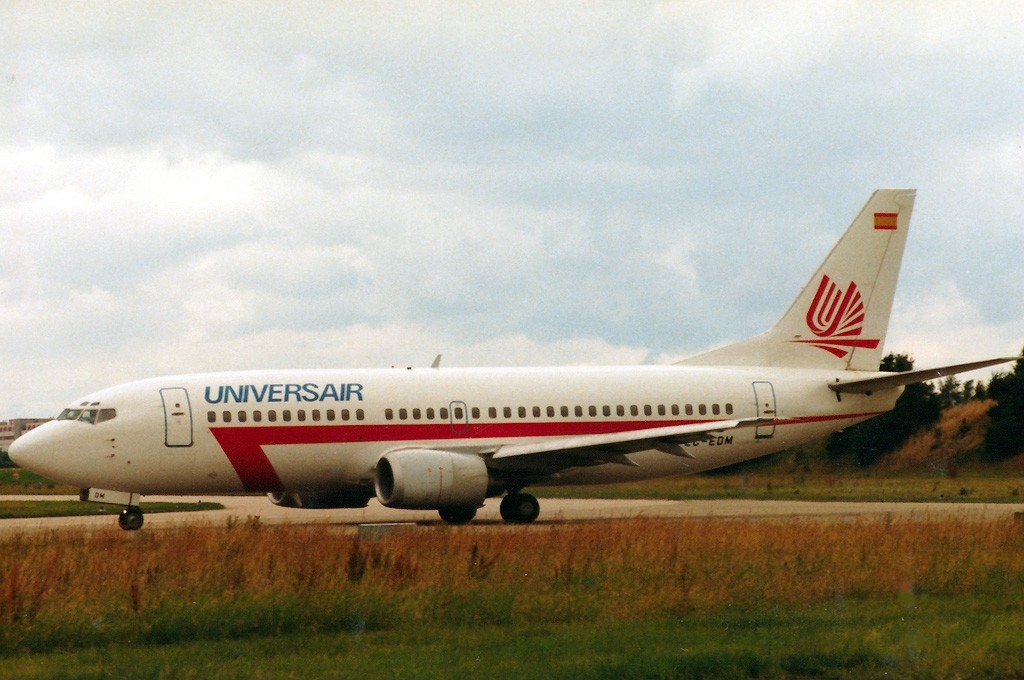
IATA	ICAO	Call sign
UN	UNA	—
- Founded: 1986
- Ceased operations: October 16, 1992 (merged with Alisarda to form Meridiana)
- Hubs: Palma de Mallorca Airport
- Secondary hubs: Josep Tarradellas Barcelona–El Prat Airport; Valencia Airport
- Fleet size: 4
- Parent company: Matutes Group
- Headquarters: Palma de Mallorca, Spain

Universair was a Spanish airline with headquarters in Palma de Mallorca. The airline operated from 1986 to 1992.

== History ==
Universair was founded in 1986 by the Matutes Group, as a charter airline.

In November 1988, one of its 737 jets was impounded at Bristol Airport, due to company debt.

In 1990, it was acquired by Meridiana Compañía Española de Aviación, S.A. to join, together with Líneas Aéreas Canarias S.A. (LAC) and Euravia, to the regular flight company project led by that holding company, controlled by Shah Karim al-Hussayni, the Aga Khan IV. In December 1990, it changed its corporate name to Meridiana Air, SA, becoming the operating company of the four airlines, and integrating most of the personnel from LAC and Euravia, as well as the fleet of five McDonnell Douglas (82 and 83) from LAC. Throughout 1990 and 1991, in addition to the aforementioned operational integration process, it incorporated four BAe 146-300 for the start of its regular flight operations, practically leaving the charter operation. As of September 1991, regular operations were carried out fundamentally from the Valencia and Barcelona airports, although the operational center was maintained in Palma de Mallorca. It was the first company to enter into direct competition with Iberia on scheduled flights, coinciding with the beginning of the liberalization of European airspace in the early 1990s.

The crisis triggered by the Gulf War, together with the strong resistance and commercial aggressiveness of Iberia, did not accompany the success of the company, which, under the General Management of José Pont Bonell, ceased operations on October 16, 1992.

It merged with the Italian airline Alisarda into the new airline Meridiana, based in Olbia, Italy.

== Fleet ==
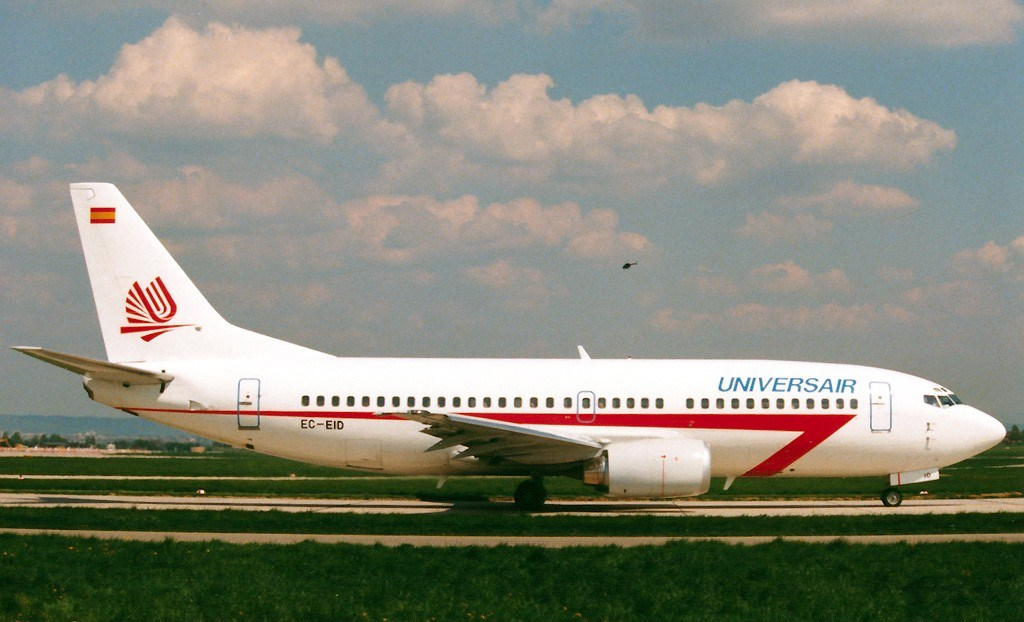
Universair Boeing 737-300

The fleet of Universair consisted of the following aircraft:

Universair Fleet
Aircraft	In service	Orders	Passengers	Notes
Boeing 737-300	3	–	TBA	
McDonnell Douglas MD-83	1	–	TBA	
Total	4	0		

== See also ==
- List of defunct airlines of Spain
