= Trabajos Aéreos y Enlaces =

Spanish charter airline

Trabajos Aéreos y Enlaces (TAE)
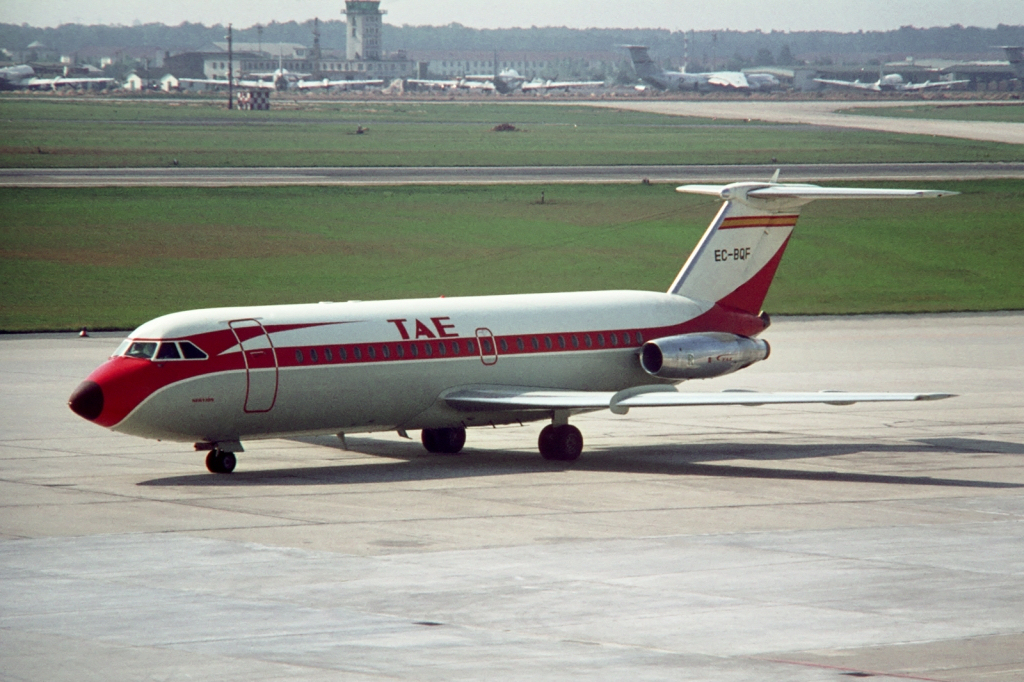
IATA	ICAO	Call sign
(none)	JK	TAE
- Founded: March 1966
- Ceased operations: 1981
- Hubs: Bilbao, Düsseldorf
- Destinations: 14
- Headquarters: Bilbao
- Key people: Mr. Alegria

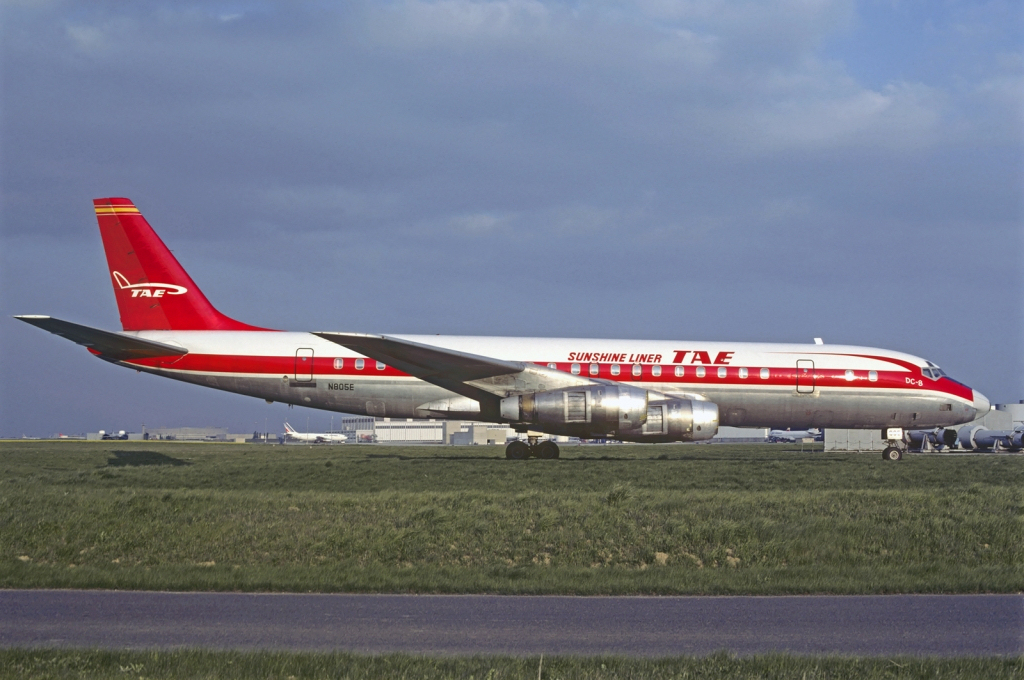
TAE Douglas DC-8-20

TAE – Trabajos Aéreos y Enlaces S.A. was an airline based in Spain that operated from 1967 until 1981. It was founded in March 1966 in Bilbao and began operations in 1967.

== Company history ==
TAE was set up in 1957 but did not begin flight operations until April 1967. They intended to operate an ex-Air France L-1049 Super Constellation in 1966 but it was not taken up. In 1967, it acquired three DC-7 and commenced operations, followed in 1969 by a BAC 1-11 but in early 1970, as a result of financial losses, flights were temporarily suspended. It was not until three years later that operations were restated under new management by leasing two Douglas DC-8s. Operations were concentrated on charter and inclusive tour flights, mainly from Germany (Düsseldorf).

In 1975, an SE 210 Caravelle was acquired followed by a second Caravelle in 1976. In 1975, Air Spain ceased operations and TAE leased one further Douglas DC-8-20 to fill in the vacuum in the charter market. The year 1980 brought an economic recession to Spain and most of Western Europe and the fortunes of TAE began to decline. Another factor that influenced the decline of TAE was increased competition from other charter operators. That, combined with the fact that TAE was operating old DC-8 and Caravelle aircraft, led to financial difficulties. TAE ceased operations in November 1981 and was dissolved in early 1982.

== Fleet details ==
- 3 - Douglas DC-8-33
- 1 - Douglas DC-8-51
- 1 - Douglas DC-8-53
- 3 - SE 210 Caravelle 10B3
- 1 - L-1049 Super Constellation (ntu)
- 2 - Douglas DC-7C (one destroyed by a fire in 1969)
- 1 - Douglas DC-7CF
- 1 - BAC 1-11-402AP

== See also ==
- List of defunct airlines of Spain
