= List of Boeing 717 operators =

The list of Boeing 717 operators lists both former and current operators of the aircraft.

== Current operators ==
Airline	Country	Photo	Status	Notes	Ref
Delta Air Lines	United States		80	Long-term lease from Southwest Airlines.	
Hawaiian Airlines	United States		19		

== Former operators ==
Airline	Country	Photo	Notes	Ref
Aerolíneas de Baleares	Spain		Rebranded as Quantum Air in 2009.	
AirTran Airways	United States		Subleased to Delta Air Lines in mid-2013 and remain in service there.	
American Airlines	United States		Taken over from Trans World Airlines and sold to AirTran Airways.	
Bangkok Airways	Thailand			
Blue1	Finland		Phased out in 2015; sold to Volotea and Delta Air Lines	
Germanwings	Germany		Leased from Aerolíneas de Baleares.	
Impulse Airlines	Australia		Later acquired by Qantas.	
Jetstar	Australia		Dry-leased from Air Connect.	
MexicanaClick	Mexico		Ceased operations in 2010.	
Midwest Airlines	United States		Phased out in November 2009 due to the airline combining with Republic Airways, Airline ceased operations shortly after	
Olympic Airlines	Greece			
QantasLink	Australia		Phased out in October 2024, one temporarily brought out of retirement until December 2024.	
Quantum Air	Spain		Ceased operations in 2010. All aircraft transferred to Blue1.	
Spanair	Spain		All aircraft transferred to Blue1.	
Trans World Airlines	United States		50 were ordered; 29 acquired by American Airlines.	
Turkmenistan Airlines	Turkmenistan		Phased out in July 2018. Last operator in Asia.	
Volotea	Spain		Phased out in January 2021 and replaced by Airbus A319-100s	
