= TLY =

TLY or tly may refer to:

- TLY, the former ICAO code for Top Fly, a defunct Spanish airline
- TLY, the Indian Railways station code for Thalassery railway station, Kerala, India
- tly, the ISO 639-3 code for Talysh language, Iran and Azerbaijan
