= ENJ =

ENJ may refer to:

- Enerjet, a Canadian airline
- Nort Jet, a defunct Spanish airline
- Engelsbergs Norberg Järnvägshistoriska förening, operators of the Engelsberg–Norberg Railway
