= VSG =

VSG may refer to:

- Laminated safety glass (German: Verbundsicherheitsglas), a type of glass that holds together when shattered.
- Variable surface glycoprotein, a protein coating the surface of some infectious microorganisms (e.g. Trypanosoma brucei) and helping them to evade the host's immune system
- VDM Verlagsservicegesellschaft, a subsidiary of the German publishing group VDM Publishing
- Venetian Most Serene Government, a Venetian political organization.
- Verilog Standards Group, the body that develops and maintains the Verilog HDL
- Vermont State Guard, the state defense force of Vermont
- Vertical sleeve gastrectomy, a bariatric surgical technique
- Victoria Scout Group, one of the two Scout Groups in Victoria Institution, a school in Kuala Lumpur, Malaysia
- Video Store Girl, one of the pseudonyms of Valerie D'Orazio, a popular comic book editor and writer
- VSG Altglienicke Berlin, a German sports club
- VSG, the Visualization Sciences Group, developers of Open Inventor and Avizo, popular 3D visualization software packages.
- VSG, IATA airport designator of the Luhansk International Airport, Luhansk, Ukraine
- VSG, ICAO airline designator of AirClass Airways (formerly Visig Operaciones Aéreas), Las Palmas de Gran Canaria, Canary Islands, Spain
- Xylene Blue VSG, another name for the colorant brilliant blue FCF (E133)
- Vasco da Gama railway station (station code: VSG) in Goa, India
