= PRJ =

PRJ may refer to:

- Jakarta Fair (Indonesian: Pekan Raya Jakarta), an annual event in Indonesia
- Patti Rutland Jazz, a dance company in Alabama, United States
- Prantij railway station (station code PRJ), Gujarat, India
- Pronair (ICAO: PRJ), a former airline based in Spain
- .prj, a file extension for the project description in a shapefile
