= Prima Air =

Spanish regional airline

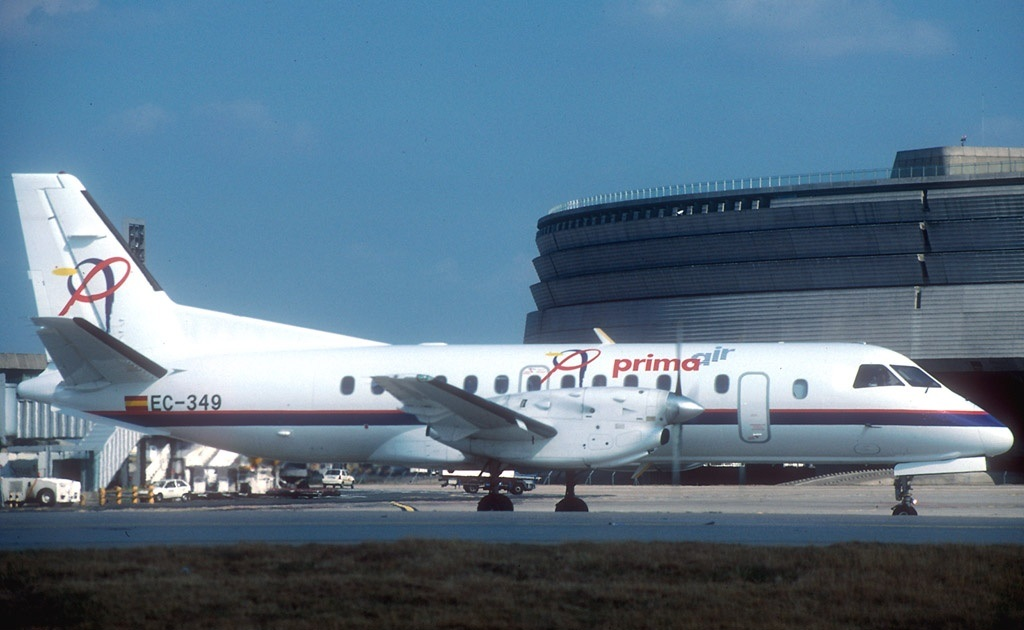
- Prima Air Saab 340B
IATA	ICAO	Call sign
-	-	-
- Founded: 1996
- Ceased operations: 1996
- Operating bases: Santiago de Compostela Airport
- Parent company: Fly Air S.A
- Headquarters: Santiago de Compostela

Prima Air was a Spanish charter airline from the Galicia region. The airline was based in Santiago de Compostela.

== Company history ==
Prima Air was founded in 1996 by Fly Air S.A., a company specializing in air medical services that had been operating in Galicia for over five years. It began operations on 2 March 1996 with a single Saab 340 turboprop, planning to add two more aircraft before the end of 1996.

Prima Air made flights between Santiago de Compostela, Bilbao, Oviedo and Santander.

The airline very soon began to make losses and ceased operations on 24 September 1996.

== Fleet ==
- 1 Saab 340B

== See also ==
- List of defunct airlines of Spain
