= Orionair =

Spanish charter airline

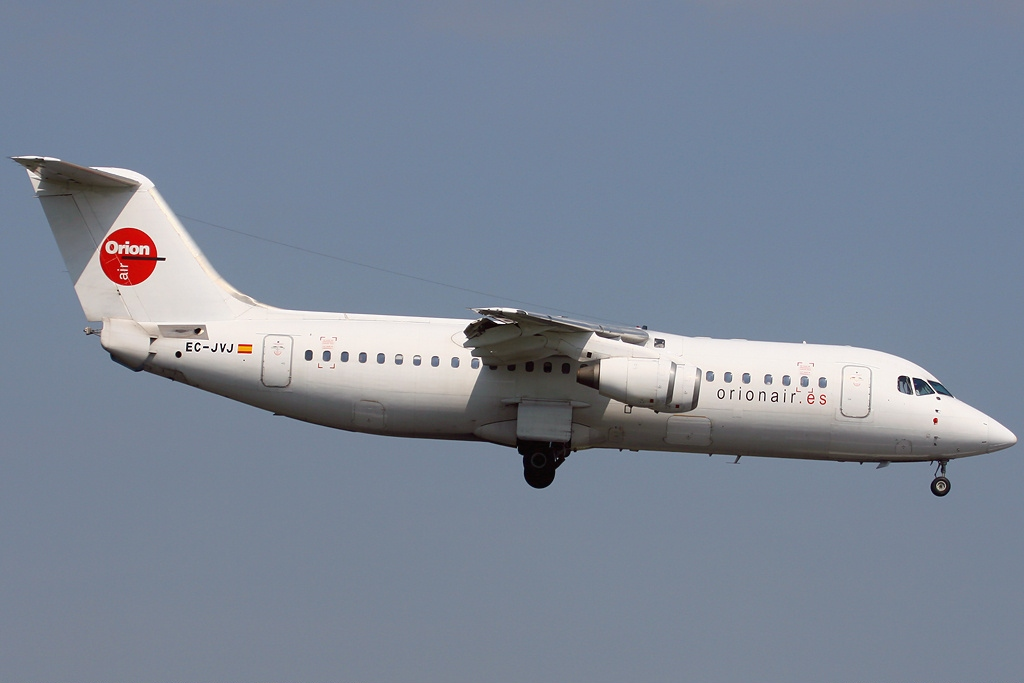
IATA	ICAO	Call sign
-	ORI	RED GLOBE
- Founded: 2004
- Ceased operations: 2009
- Hubs: Madrid Barajas International Airport
- Fleet size: 3
- Destinations: Europe and others destinations
- Headquarters: Madrid Barajas International Airport, Spain
- Website: http://www.orionair.es/

Orionair was a charter airline based in Valencia, Spain.

== History ==
Orionair was established in 2004 and operated domestic and international services in Europe and to Tunisia. Its main base was Valencia Airport, with a hub at Madrid Barajas International Airport. It had offices in Madrid and Valencia and it was part of the TravelPlan group.

The airline suspended operations on 4 June 2009.

== Destinations ==
Orionair operated mainly services to Europe such as Salerno and Bucharest.

== Fleet ==
The Orionair fleet included the following aircraft (as of 4 July 2009):

- 2 BAe 146-300 (which are operated for Syrian Pearl Airlines)
- 1 Embraer EMB 120 Brasilia

== See also ==
- List of defunct airlines of Spain
