= Syrian Pearl Airlines =

IATA	ICAO	Call sign
-	PSB	-
- Founded: 2009
- Ceased operations: 2010
- Hubs: [[Damascus International Airport]|Damascus]]
- Fleet size: 2
- Destinations: 4
- Headquarters: Damascus, Syria
- Key people: Abdul Rahman Al Attar (Chairman); Feras Mohamad (Vice chairman); Mohamed Rustom; Omar Karkour
- Website: www.flysyrianpearl.com

Syrian Pearl, Inc., operated as Syrian Pearl Airlines (Arabic: طيران لؤلؤة السورية), was a short-lived private airline based in Syria. It operated domestic flights within Syria. In 2010, the airline ceased all operations.

== Destinations ==
Syrian Pearl Airlines operated the following services (as of May 2009):

- Syria
  - Qamishli (Qamishli International Airport)
  - Aleppo (Aleppo International Airport)
  - Damascus (Damascus International Airport) Base
  - Deir ez-Zor (Deir ez-Zor Airport)
  - Latakia (Latakia International Airport)

== Fleet ==
- 2 BAe 146-300 (which are operated by Orionair)
