= Oasis Airlines =

Spanish-based airline

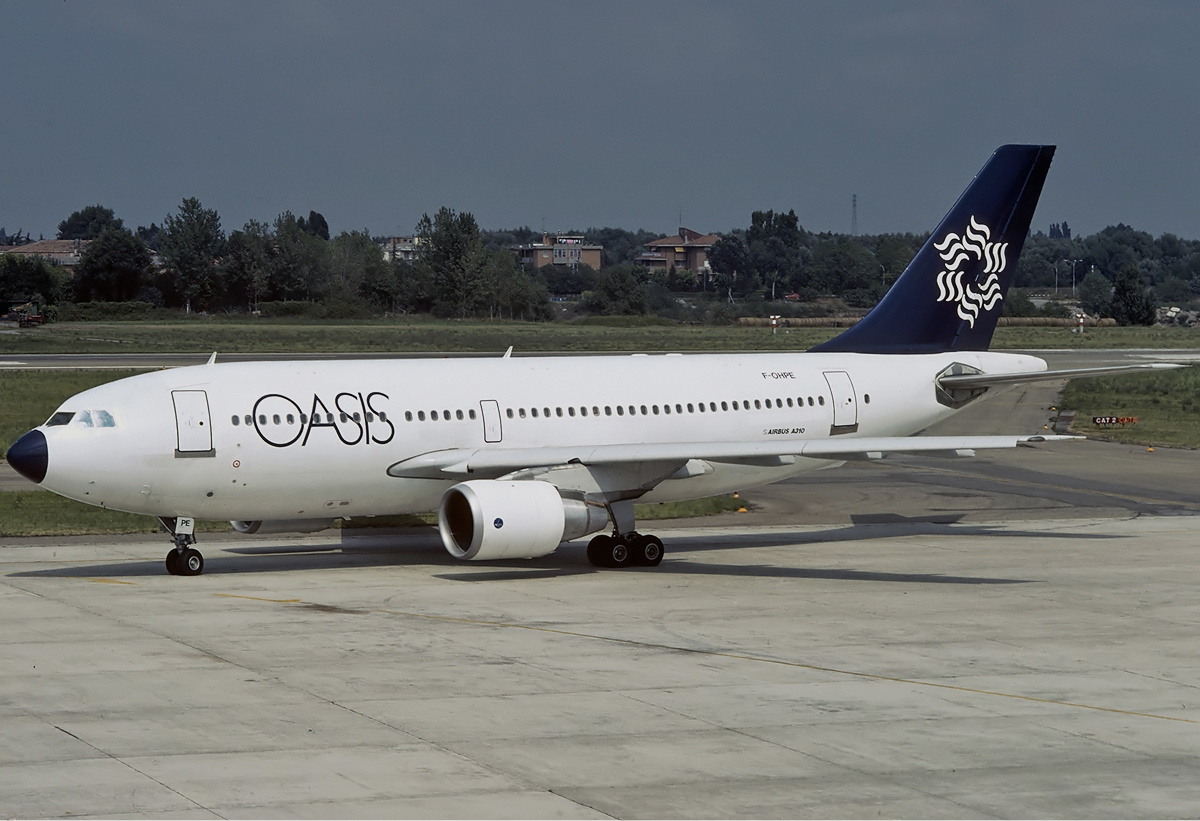
IATA	ICAO	Call sign
OB	AAN	OASIS
- Founded: 1986 (as Andalusair)
- Ceased operations: December 11, 1996
- Operating bases: Madrid–Barajas Airport; Palma de Mallorca Airport
- Subsidiaries: Air Ambar; Aerocancun; Private Jet Expeditions
- Parent company: Oasis Hotel Group

Oasis International Airlines, S.A. was a charter airline based in Spain.

== History ==
The airline was established in 1986 under the name Andalusair, originally based in Málaga. The next year, the Oasis Hotel Group took over the airline, and since operations were not going well, they renamed the airline Oasis Airlines and operations began using MD-83 aircraft on charter flights from the United Kingdom, Scandinavia, and other points in Europe to Spain. In August 1992, the Oasis group bought Aerocancun and introduced the Airbus A310, used by both airlines. Short afterwards, more MD-80s were acquired and operations expanded.

During the 1990s, the Oasis group invested in other airlines, such as Aerovaradero and Private Jet Expeditions while the charter traffic increased. But by 1995, the demand for tourist flights had decreased, and Oasis Airlines entered the scheduled market in Spain. Competition from other airlines was fierce, and losses mounted. The financial difficulties led to bankruptcy and the end of operations on December 11, 1996.

== Fleet ==
Oasis Airlines operated the following aircraft:

Aircraft	Total	Introduced	Retired	Notes
Airbus A310-200	1	1995	1996	
Airbus A310-300	4	1992	1996	
Airbus A320-200	1	1994	1994	Leased from Shorouk Air
McDonnell Douglas MD-82	3	1991	1996	
McDonnell Douglas MD-83	13	1988	1996	
McDonnell Douglas MD-87	1	1994	1995	

== See also ==
- List of defunct airlines of Spain
