= Viva Air =

Spanish airline, 1988–1999

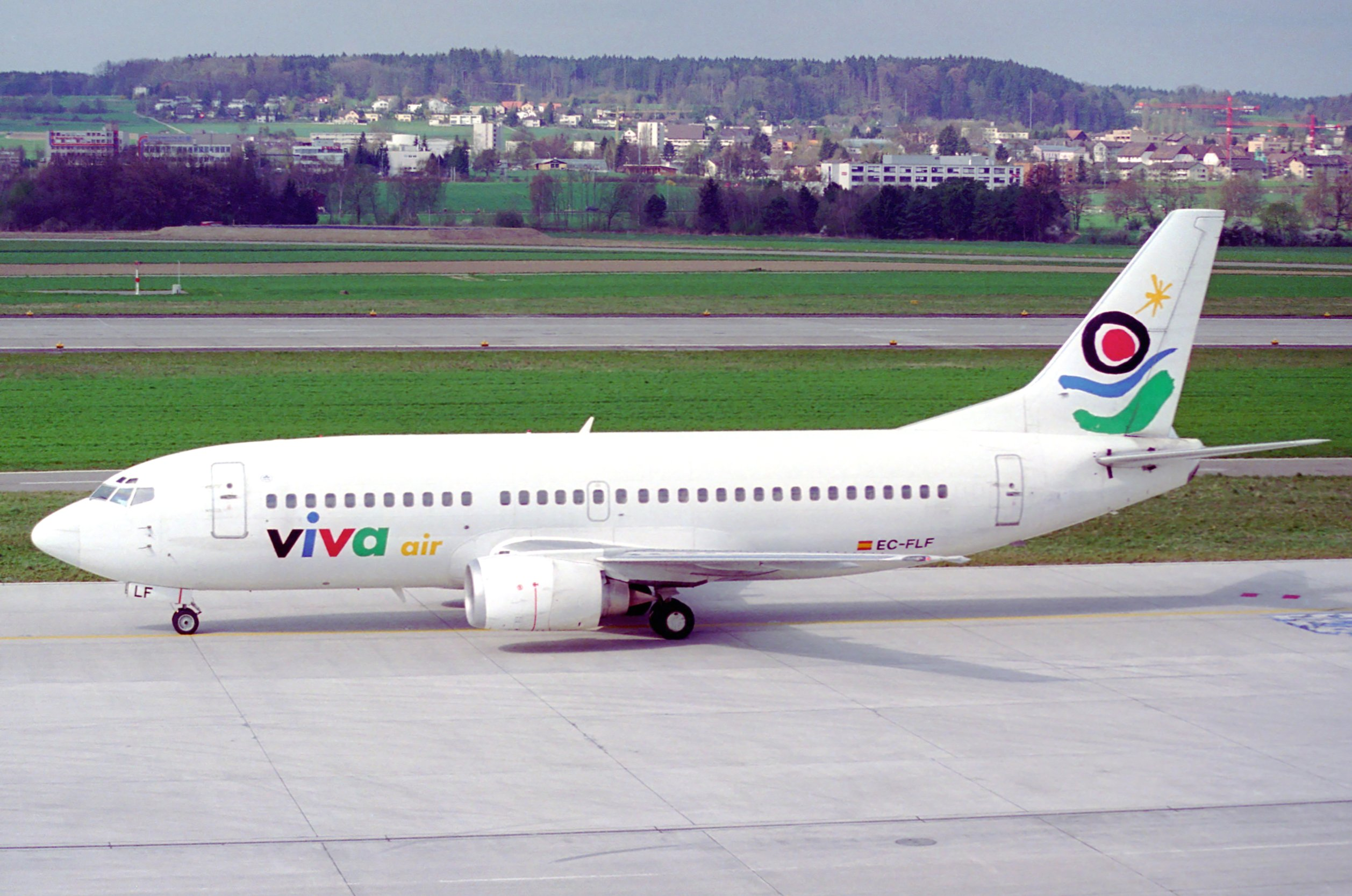
- A Viva Air Boeing 737-300 taxiing at Zurich Airport in 1995
IATA	ICAO	Call sign
FV	VIV	VIVA
- Founded: 24 February 1988
- Ceased operations: March 1999
- Operating bases: Palma de Mallorca Airport
- Fleet size: 9
- Parent company: Iberia; Lufthansa (until 1992)
- Headquarters: Palma de Mallorca, Spain

Viva Air (legally Vuelos Internacionales de Vacaciones, S.A.) was an airline from Spain that operated during the 1980s and 1990s.

== History ==
Viva Air was founded on 24 February 1988 by Iberia and Lufthansa. At the beginning, flights were mostly from Germany to Spain, in particular to Palma de Mallorca. By 1992, the partnership between Lufthansa and Iberia dissolved and Iberia took over the operations of Viva Air. Shortly thereafter, Viva Air entered the Spanish domestic scheduled market using Douglas DC-9s, but those were quickly replaced by the Boeing 737-300.

The airline's aircraft stood out with their simple and colourful Joan Miró-style livery created by Spanish school children. It was intended to symbolise the Spanish sunshine which most of its passengers sought during their holidays. After the first few years of operation, the airline was one of the first subsidiary airlines of a major carrier (in this case Iberia) to gain a foothold into London's Heathrow Airport from where Viva operated several scheduled services on behalf of its parent company using Viva callsigns and Viva flight numbers.

Since the scheduled flights were losing money, Iberia took over those routes and Viva Air was relegated to charter flights using Boeing 737-300 aircraft of which it had 10 in service by 1995.

Owing to heavy competition from other Spanish and European charter companies, Viva Air began to lose money and, by 1999, operations ceased and the airline was liquidated. Iberia took over all staff, aircraft and route licenses.

== See also ==
- List of defunct airlines of Spain
