= Gadair European Airlines =

Spanish airline

IATA	ICAO	Call sign
GP	GDR	Gadair
- Founded: 2006
- Commenced operations: 2007
- Ceased operations: 2009
- Hubs: Madrid Barajas International Airport
- Fleet size: 1
- Destinations: -
- Parent company: Hola Airlines
- Headquarters: Madrid, Spain
- Key people: Santiago Sanchez Marin
- Website: www.gadair.com (defunct)

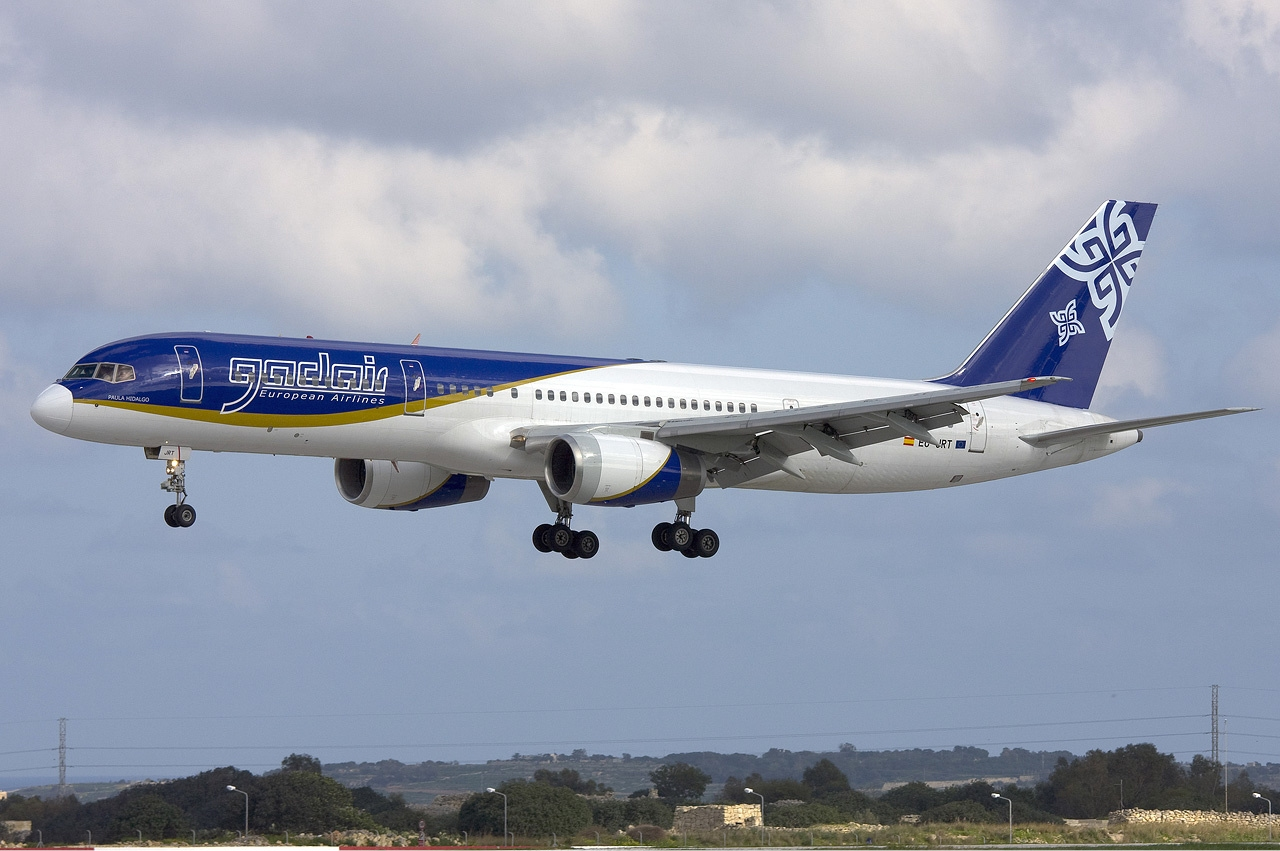
Gadair Boeing 757

Gadair European Airlines was an airline based in Madrid, Spain. It was operating aircraft on ACMI leases for services to five continents. A number of changes of plan have been made, including a switch to Bahrain as the main hub.

== History ==
The airline planned to launch operations on 10 April 2006 but was delayed due to licensing acquirement issues and began operations in June 2007. The airline was owned by Grupo AISA and Santiago Sanchez Marin.

In 2007 new shareholders entered in a capital increase, that resulted having two new shareholders, S. Kahla 25% and A. Baker 50%. The airline ceased operations around 2009.

== Fleet ==
- 2 Boeing 757 on lease

== See also ==
- List of defunct airlines of Spain
