= Castle of Aguas Mansas =

- Castillo de Aguas Mansas (Spanish)
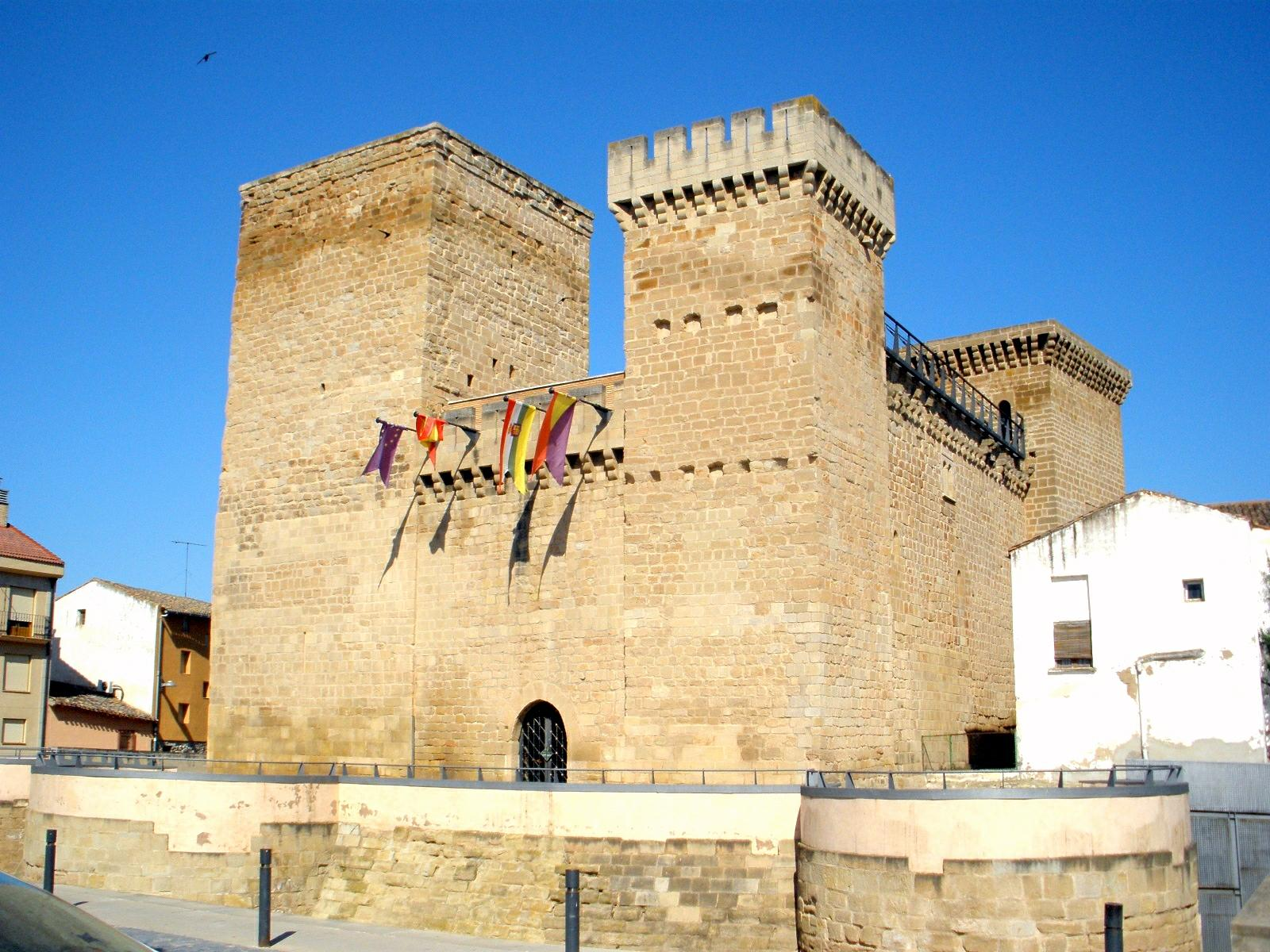

- Location within Spain
- 42.44611°N 2.29139°W
- Location: Agoncillo, La Rioja, Spain

History
- Built: 13th and 14th centuries

Site notes
- Restored: 1990

Spanish Cultural Heritage
- Official name: Castillo de Aguas Mansas
- Type: Non-movable
- Criteria: Monument
- Designated: 1983
- Reference no.: RI-51-0004824

The so called castle of Aguas Mansas (which could be translated as castle of Calm Waters or Quiet Waters) is a remarkable medieval castle, which is in an excellent state of conservation, located in the municipality of Agoncillo in La Rioja, Spain. It was built during the 13th and 14th centuries.

The coat of arms of the House Medrano with the Calatrava Cross can be found of the eastern facade, sign of its Dominion and its most recent historical ownership.

The monument complex is right now occupied by the Town hall, Library and other Agoncillo Town Departments and can be visited -always after booking the aforementioned dependencies- on working days during the opening hours of the administration.

== History ==
The Codex Vigilanus mentions the conquest of a Muslim castle in this in this area by Sancho Garcés, king of Pamplona at the beginning of the 10th century. Subsequently, several documents of the 11th and 12th centuries name a fortress called Aguas Mansas (Calm Waters) or Aguas Muertas (Dead Waters) and draw the attention to the high quality of its defences. This may be the cause this site was so coveted and in 1191, Alfonso VIII reached an agreement with Pedro and Gómez García about the state surrounding lands.

In 1337 Rodrigo Alfonso de Medrano, crossbowman of Alfonso XI, bought the village and the castle and started carrying out several remodelling works adapting it to the style of the 14th century. In his testament in 1345 he noted having spent big amounts of money in "...building the castle and the village" (in Old Spanish "...fazer el castillo e la villa"). During the battles between Peter the Cruel and Henry of Trastámara, the castle passed onto the hands of Charles II of Navarre, although for a short period. In 1392, it was owned was Rodrigo Alfonso de Algoncillo (sic.) who bequeathed it to his nephew Diego López de Medrano and to his heirs, the Counts of Siruela who inhabited it until the 19th century.

== Architecture ==
The floor plant of the castle is almost rectangular with four prism-shaped towers on each corner whose machicolations are still preserved to the current day. Built with dimension stones and in two stages, the first in the middle of the 14th century over a former building and other at the end of the 15th century. The highest tower hast four floors and a door with a pointed arch. The smallest tower, called de las palomas (of the doves), has some well preserved modillions which supported the machicolation.

The parade ground, restored in the 16th century, has a cloister shape, is built at two levels and the gallery of the main floor rests on semicircular arches.

An integral restoration was carried out in 1990, removing some removing some utilitarian rooms created in the 18th and 19th century returning it to its former appearance.

== Bibliography ==
- Goicoechea, Cesáreo (1949). Castillos de la Rioja, notas descriptivas e históricas (in Spanish). Logroño. p. 125. ISBN 84-398-9272-1.
- Queralt del Hierro, María Pilar (2004). Los mejores castillos de España (in Spanish). León: Everest. pp. 380 ff. ISBN 84-241-0767-5.
