= Hola Airlines =

Spanish airline based in Palma de Mallorca (2002–2010)

| IATA | ICAO | Call sign |
|---|---|---|
| H5 | HOA | HOLA |
- Founded: 2002
- Commenced operations: 15 May 2002
- Ceased operations: 15 February 2010
- Hubs: Son Sant Joan Airport
- Secondary hubs: Madrid Barajas International Airport
- Headquarters: Palma de Mallorca, Spain
- Key people: Mario Hidalgo (CEO)
- Website: www.holaairlines.com

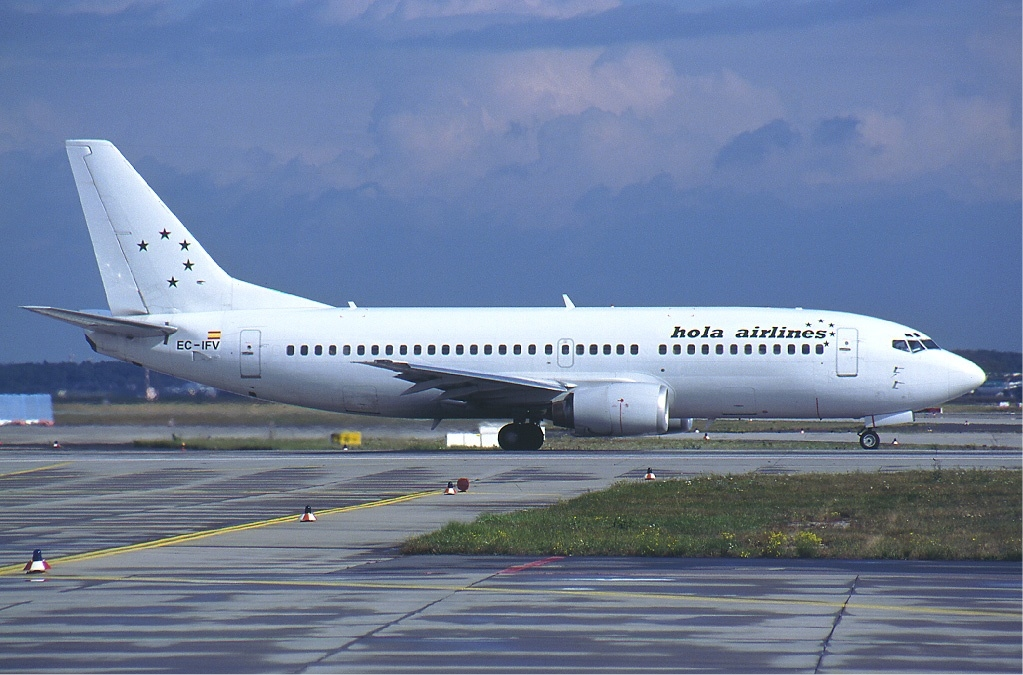
A Hola Airlines Boeing 737-300

Hola Airlines (Baleares Link Express SL) was an airline based in Palma de Mallorca, Mallorca, Spain. It operated European charter services. Its main base was Son Sant Joan Airport, Palma de Mallorca, with another hub at Madrid Barajas International Airport.

== History ==
The airline was established in 2002 and started operations on 15 May 2002. It was set up by Mario Hidalgo, who previously ran Air Europa Express, and was majority owned by Gadair European Airlines with a 51% shareholding. It had 35 employees in February 2009. It ceased operations on 15 February 2010.

== Fleet ==
The Hola Airlines fleet never numbered more than three aircraft. The airline operated the following aircraft types during its existence:

Hola Airlines fleet
| Aircraft | Years operated |
|---|---|
| Boeing 737-300 | 2002–2006; 2007–2008 |
| Boeing 737-400 | 2006–2010 |
| Boeing 757-200 | 2003–2007 |

== See also ==
- List of defunct airlines of Spain
