= Air Andalucia =

Spanish low-cost airline

IATA	ICAO	Call sign
-	-	-
- Founded: 2003
- Commenced operations: 2005
- Ceased operations: 2005
- Operating bases: Federico García Lorca Airport
- Headquarters: Granada, Spain

Air Andalucia was a low-cost airline based in Granada, Spain. It was a start-up airline intending to operate domestic services, as well as services to Europe. Its main base was Federico García Lorca Airport, Granada.

Air Andalucia went bankrupt in 2005.

== History ==
The airline was established in 2003 and was due to start operations in March 2005 but never launched flights. It was owned by AJet (Aviation Holdings) Ltd.

It was the first airline at Granada airport offering direct flights to international destinations at a low cost. The airline would use Airbus A320 aircraft and expected to expand its fleet to 18 aircraft.

== Destinations ==
International services were to be operated from Granada to London and Odense, Denmark.

== See also ==
- List of defunct airlines of Spain
