= Ándalus Líneas Aéreas =

Spanish regional airline

IATA	ICAO	Call sign
EA	ANU	ANDALUS
- Founded: 2008
- Commenced operations: 27 February 2009
- Ceased operations: 13 August 2010
- Hubs: Málaga Airport
- Secondary hubs: Madrid Airport, Nador Airport, Barcelona Airport
- Fleet size: 2
- Destinations: 7
- Headquarters: Málaga, Spain
- Website: http://www.andalus.es/

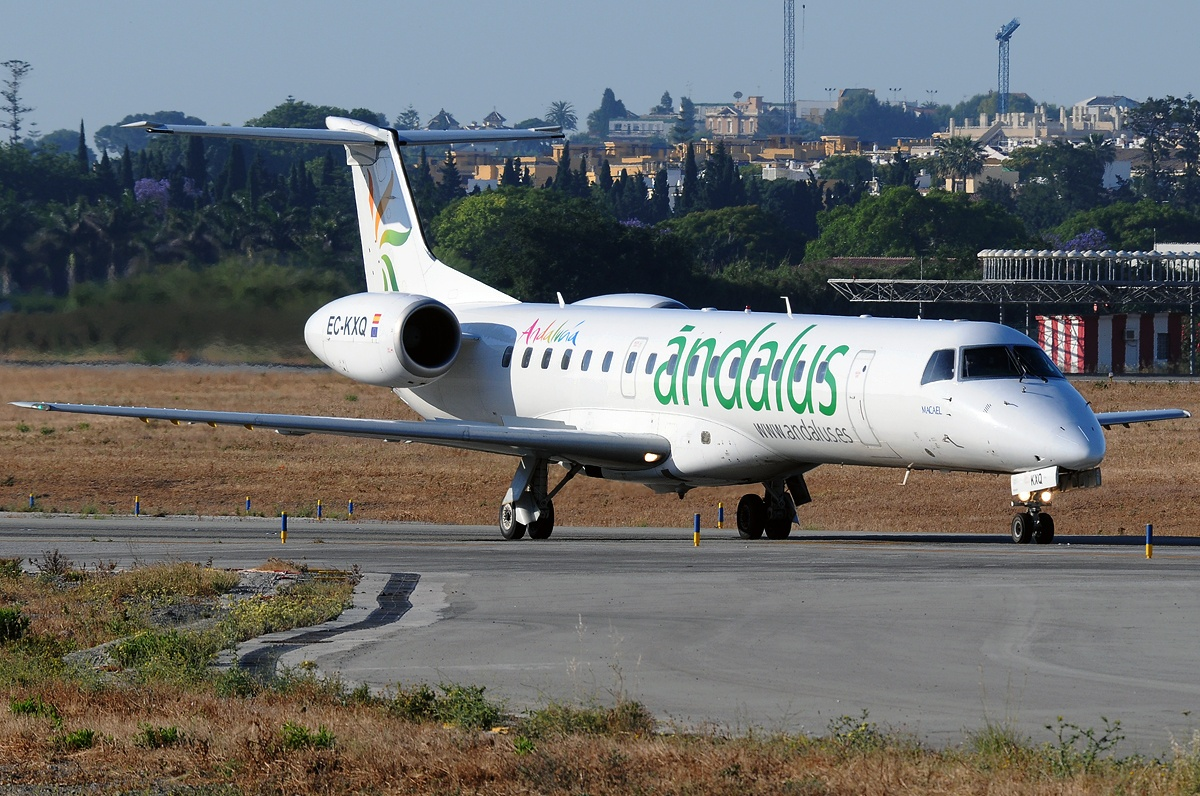
Andalus Lineas Aereas Embraer EMB-145EU

Ándalus Líneas Aéreas, also known as just Ándalus, was a Spanish regional airline based in Málaga, Spain. It offered regular flights, charters and ad hoc transportation services aiming to attract tourist traffic to Andalucia and opening up new destinations for the community.

== History ==
On February 27, 2009, the airline started its first passenger flights. Its founders were executives of the airline Air Madrid, which ceased operation in December 2006. Initially, its fleet comprises an Embraer 145, but this was expected to increase to offer B767 flights to the Caribbean and Latin America, but this never happened.

On April 29 it commenced flights on the Gibraltar to Madrid route previously abandoned by GB Airways and Iberia. Daily weekday flights to Madrid with an additional Sunday night service were operating. Thrice weekly flights to Barcelona has commenced from the start of July 2009. The routes would be flown by Embraer 145. This is the first time that Gibraltar airport has had flights to both Madrid and Barcelona.

On 13 August 2010, the airline ceased operations because the local aviation authorities withdrew their licence.

Ándalus used the IATA code "EA", which previously belonged to the now defunct German airline European Air Express.

== Fleet ==
The Ándalus Líneas Aéreas fleet consisted of the following aircraft as of 8 July 2010:

ndalus Líneas Aéreas
Aircraft	Total	Orders	Passengers (Business/Economy)	Notes
ATR 42-300	1	0		operated by Top Fly
Embraer 145Jet	1	0	50 (0/50)	
