= Plaza Servicios Aéreos =

Passenger and domestic cargo airline based in Spain

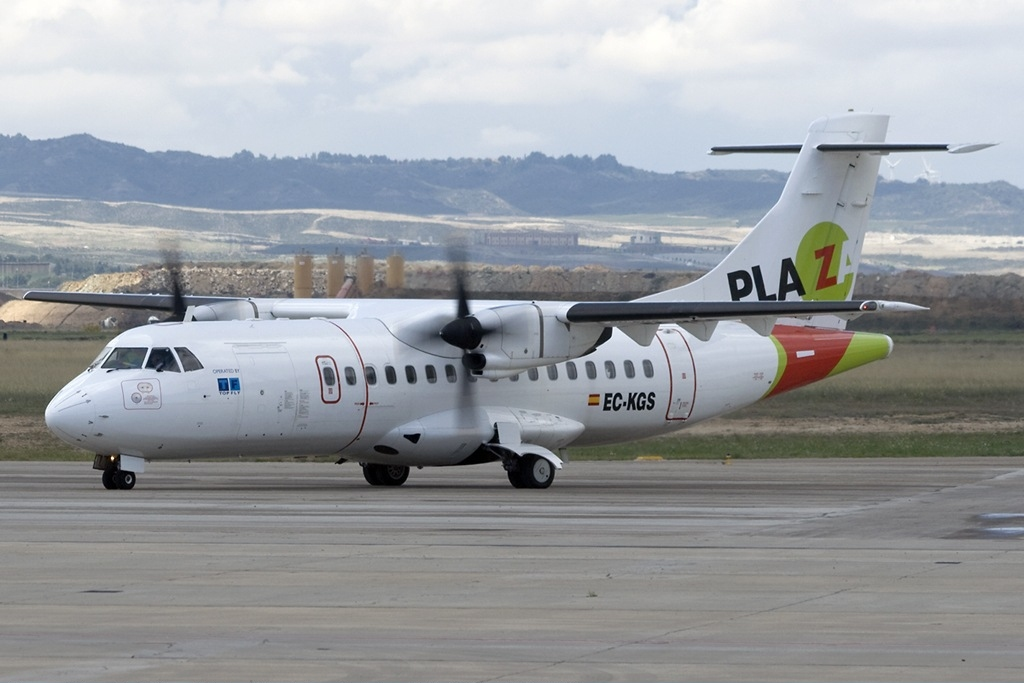
- Plaza Servicios Aéreos Aerospatiale ATR 42-300 at Zaragoza Airport
IATA	ICAO	Call sign
-	-	-
- Founded: 2006
- Ceased operations: 2008
- Hubs: Zaragoza
- Fleet size: 1
- Destinations: 3
- Headquarters: Zaragoza, Spain
- Website: plazaserviciosaereos.net

Plaza Servicios Aéreos was a passenger and domestic cargo airline based in Zaragoza, Aragon, Spain.

== History ==
The airline was established in 2006 and was wholly owned by Swiftair. It ceased operations in 2008.

== Destinations ==
Plaza Servicios Aéreos operated the following services from Zaragoza until October 2008:

=== Spain ===
- Málaga
- Santiago de Compostela

== Fleet ==
The Plaza Servicios Aéreos fleet included the following aircraft (as of 21 September 2008):

- 1 ATR 42-300 (operated by Top Fly)
- 2 Boeing 727-200 (operated by Swiftair)
