= Quantum Air =

Domestic airline of Spain (1999–2010)

Aerolíneas de Baleares S.A.
IATA	ICAO	Call sign
DF (1999–2008); QO (2009–2010)	ABH (1999–2008); QTM (2009–2010)	AIR BALEAR (1999–2008); QUANTUM (2009–2010)
- Founded: 1999 (as AeBal); March 2009 (as Quantum Air)
- Commenced operations: 5 July 2000
- Ceased operations: 16 September 2008 (as AeBal); 26 January 2010 (as Quantum Air)
- Operating bases: Madrid; Palma de Mallorca
- Fleet size: 5
- Destinations: 10
- Headquarters: Madrid, Spain
- Employees: 155 (2007)
- Website: www.quantum-air.com

Quantum Air (formerly known as AeBal or Aerolíneas de Baleares) was an airline based in Madrid, Spain. It operated domestic scheduled services within Spain, as well as charter and ACMI operations all over Europe. Its fleet was originally wet-leased to Spanair for use on domestic and international routes, but since 14 September 2008, they have operated on their own.

== History ==
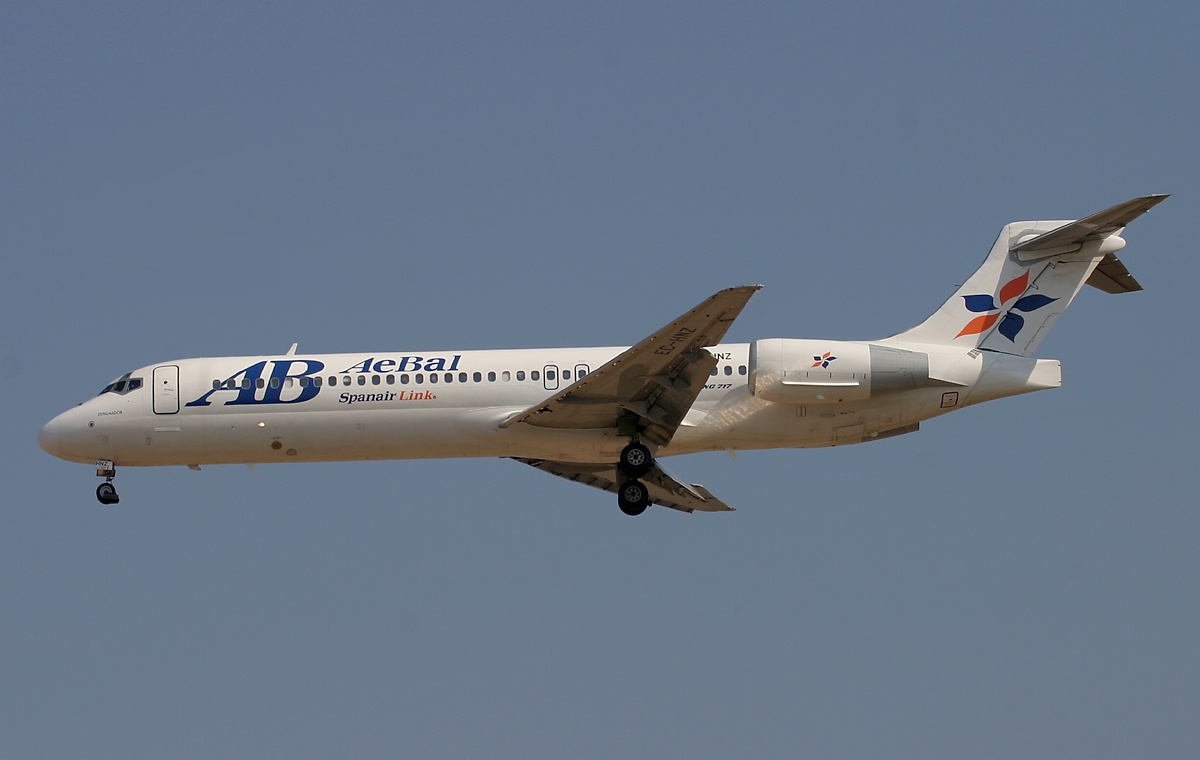
AeBal Boeing 717-200 (2003)

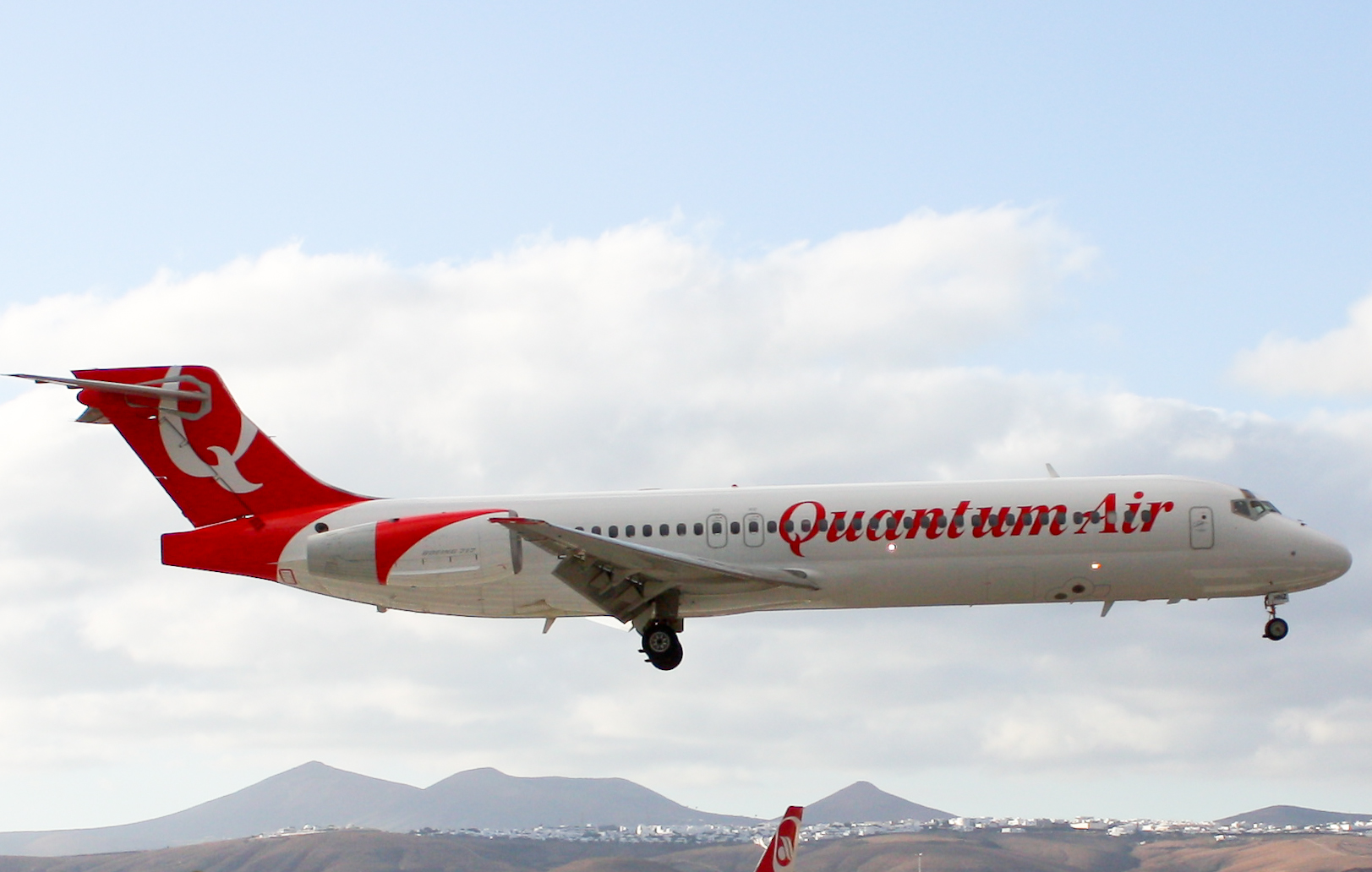
Quantum Air Boeing 717-200 (2009)

The company was established in 1999 with headquarters in Son Sant Joan Airport, Palma de Mallorca. Originally it was intended to be named AB Bluestar but the name was changed to AeBal - Aerolíneas de Baleares. The company started operations on 5 July 2000 from Madrid with domestic services and an initial fleet of three Boeing 717 aircraft. It was owned by Grupo Marsans (51%), SAS Group (25%), Spanair (18%) and VITRAC (6%). The company operated under the name AeBal - Spanair Link, retaining much of its Spanair pedigree in the livery. It had 155 employees in March 2007. A number of changes in the company's shareholding structure ended up with SAS Group owning 100% of the company.

AeBal ceased operations on 16 September 2008, as part of the Spanair economic restructuring plan, canceling their wet-lease agreement.

AeBal ceased to exist after it was sold by SAS in January 2009 to Proturin, a Spanish investment company controlled by former Aerolíneas Argentinas CEO, Antonio Mata. In March 2009, AeBal was replaced by Quantum Air, and its main base was moved from Mallorca to Madrid–Barajas Airport. Mata tried unsuccessfully to replace the ageing MD-87 with newer Boeing 717. After several defaults in the payments of the plane leases, SAS made a move to impound the fleet and the planes were grounded during the legal squabbles that followed between SAS and Antonio Mata. On 26 January 2010, Quantum Air temporarily ceased operations and ticketing. Finally in October 2012, a court in Palma de Mallorca issued a verdict in favour of the company, ordering SAS to pay 6.3 million €.

== Destinations ==
Quantum Air operated to the following domestic scheduled destinations in Spain (as of July 2009):

- Bilbao - Bilbao Airport
- Fuerteventura - Fuerteventura Airport
- Gran Canaria - Gran Canaria Airport
- Lanzarote - Lanzarote Airport
- Madrid - Madrid–Barajas Airport - base
- Palma de Mallorca - Palma de Mallorca Airport - base
- Tenerife - Tenerife North–Ciudad de La Laguna Airport
- Málaga - Málaga Airport
- Sevilla - San Pablo Airport
- Alicante - Alicante–Elche Miguel Hernández Airport
- Santiago de Compostela - Santiago–Rosalía de Castro Airport

== Fleet ==
The Quantum Air fleet consisted of the following aircraft (as of November 12, 2009). The entire fleet was delivered starting September 2010 to Blue1.

Quantum Air fleet
Aircraft	In service	Passengers	Notes
Boeing 717-200	5	115	All later delivered to Blue1.
Total	5		

== See also ==
- List of defunct airlines of Spain
