= Drenair =

Spanish airline

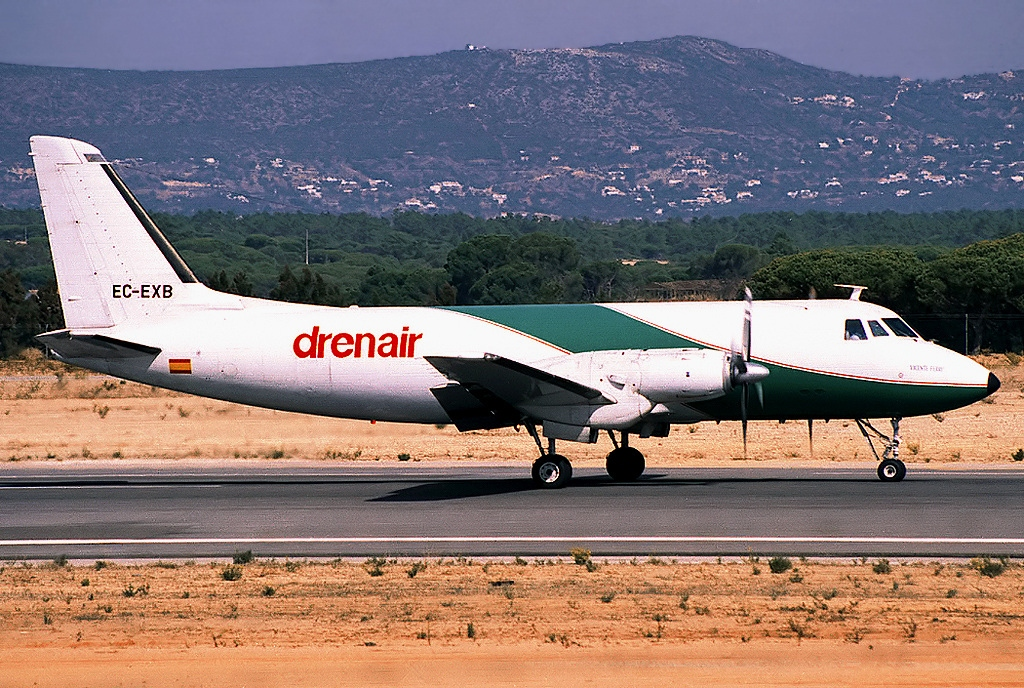
- Drenair Grumman G-159 Gulfstream G-I at Faro Airport
IATA	ICAO	Call sign
-	DRS	-
- Commenced operations: 1986
- Ceased operations: 2003
- Headquarters: Madrid, Spain

Drenair was an airline based in Madrid, Spain.

== History ==
Drenair was founded in 1986 by Spanish entrepreneur Salvador Sanchís Pavía, who would be also the owner of the company, together with Rafael Murcia Llorens. It operated domestic passenger and cargo services. The airline went bankrupt in 1996 and was subsequently bailed out, but owing to mounting losses it ceased operations in 2003.

== Code data ==
- ICAO Code: DRS (not current)

== Fleet ==
Drenair used different aircraft along its history.

- 1 Dassault Falcon 20D
- 13 Grumman Gulfstream I
- 1 Aérospatiale SN 601 Corvette
