= Nort Jet =

Spanish charter airline

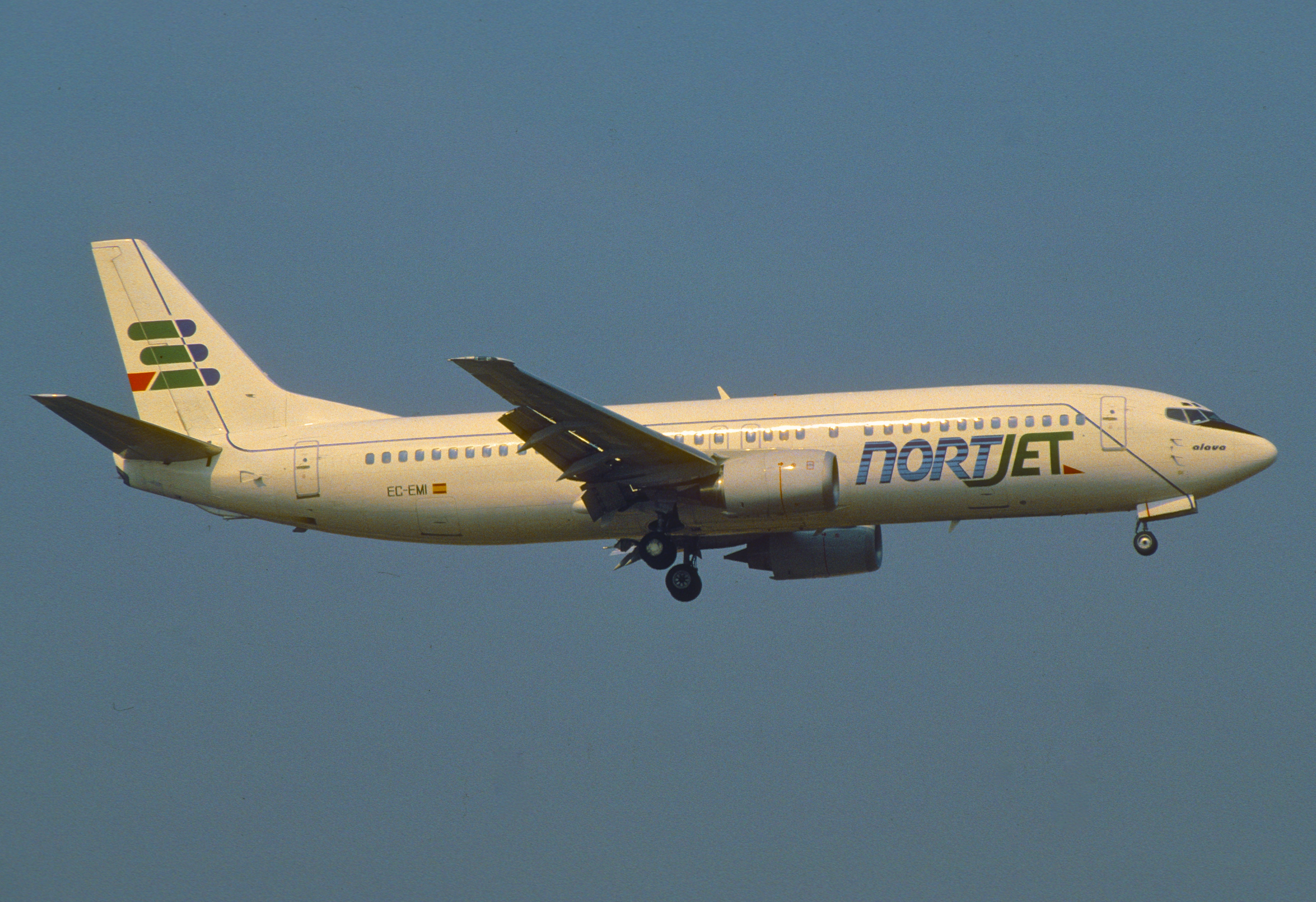
- Nort Jet Boeing 737-4Y0
IATA	ICAO	Call sign
EL	ENJ	Nortjet
- Founded: 1989
- Ceased operations: 1992
- Operating bases: Palma de Mallorca Airport
- Parent company: Euskal Air S.A
- Headquarters: Palma de Mallorca Airport

Nort Jet was a Spanish charter airline owned by Euskal Air S.A., a company from the Basque region. The airline had an association with the French airline Air Charter International.

== Company history ==
Nort Jet was founded in February 1989 by mostly Basque entrepreneurs, including Bilbao Bizkaia Kutxa, Caja Vital and Caja Guipúzcoa, three banks of the region. Since Nort Jet had been projected as a Basque airline originally Vitoria Airport had been intended as its headquarters. However, Euskal Air company had to face too many legal difficulties to set up an airport in the Basque Country as a base for its airline. Therefore, operations began with Palma de Mallorca Airport as a base, a location which also would become its only headquarters.

Nort Jet began with flights between Vitoria, Valladolid, Sevilla and Málaga with the aim to find a place in the regular flight market. Owing to lack of assistance from the Basque Government and lack of expected returns, the airline ceased operations on 14 April 1992.

== Fleet ==
- 3 Boeing 737-4Y0, which were given the names Álava, Guipúzcoa and Vizcaya
- 1 BAE 146-200 QT

== See also ==
- List of defunct airlines of Spain
