= Pronair =

Spanish charter airline

| IATA | ICAO | Call sign |
|---|---|---|
| - | PRJ | PRONAIR |
- Founded: 2007
- Ceased operations: 2009
- Hubs: Albacete Airport
- Fleet size: 3
- Destinations: Santander, Madrid, and Barcelona
- Headquarters: Albacete, Spain
- Website: www.pronair.es

Pronair Airlines S.L. was a charter airline based in Albacete, Spain.

== History ==
Pronair was established in 2007 beginning with air taxi services with a Cessna Citation II. Shortly thereafter, its projects became more ambitious, operating domestic and international services from its base at Albacete Airport. The airline ceased operations in 2009.

== Fleet ==
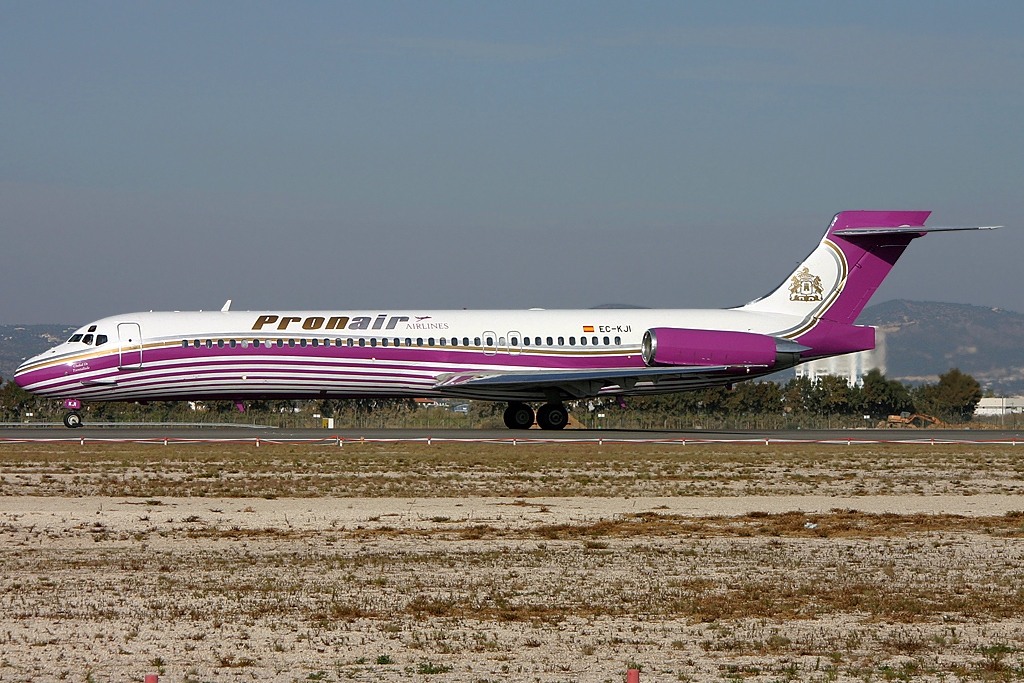
A Pronair McDonnell Douglas MD-87 at Faro Airport in 2007

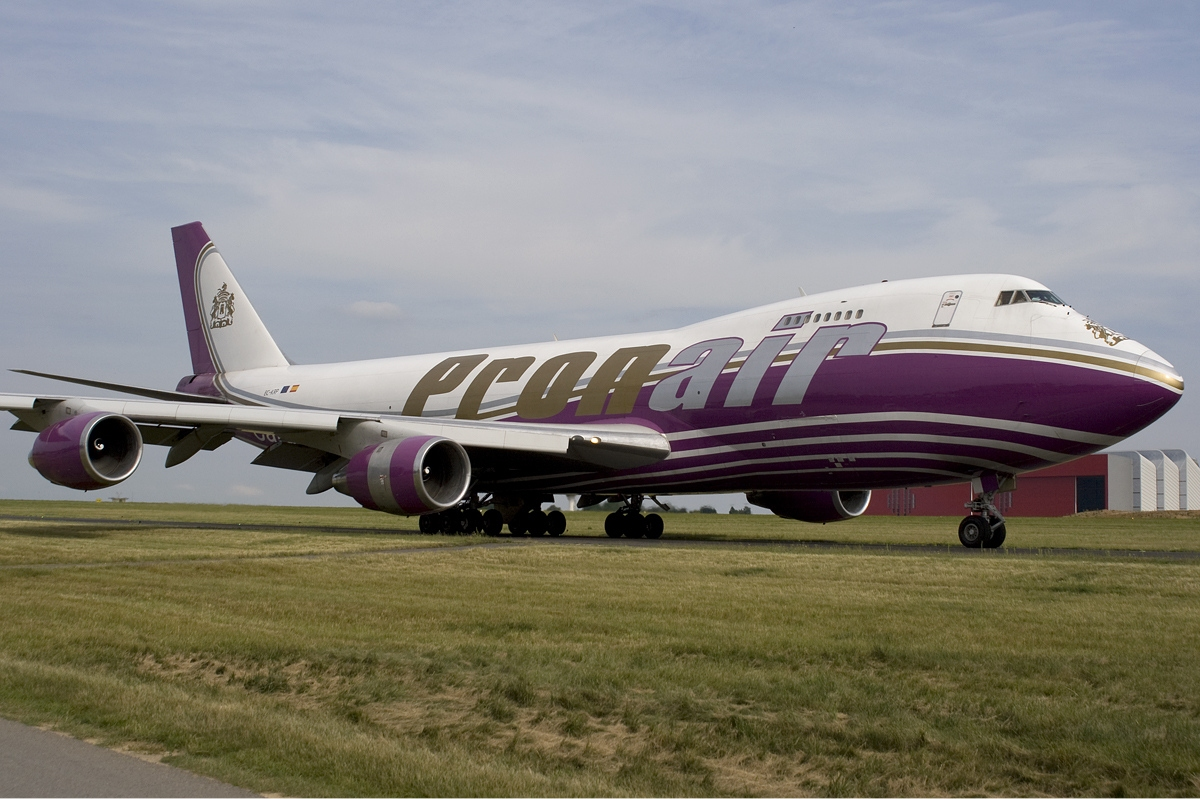
Pronair's sole Boeing 747-200F at Luxembourg Airport in 2008

The Pronair fleet included the following aircraft (as of October 2008):

Pronair fleet
| Aircraft | In service | Orders | Passengers | Notes |
|---|---|---|---|---|
| Boeing 747-200F | 1 | — | Cargo | |
| McDonnell Douglas MD-87 | 2 | — | 116 | |
| Total | 3 | — | | |

== See also ==
- List of defunct airlines of Spain
