= Recajo =

- Village
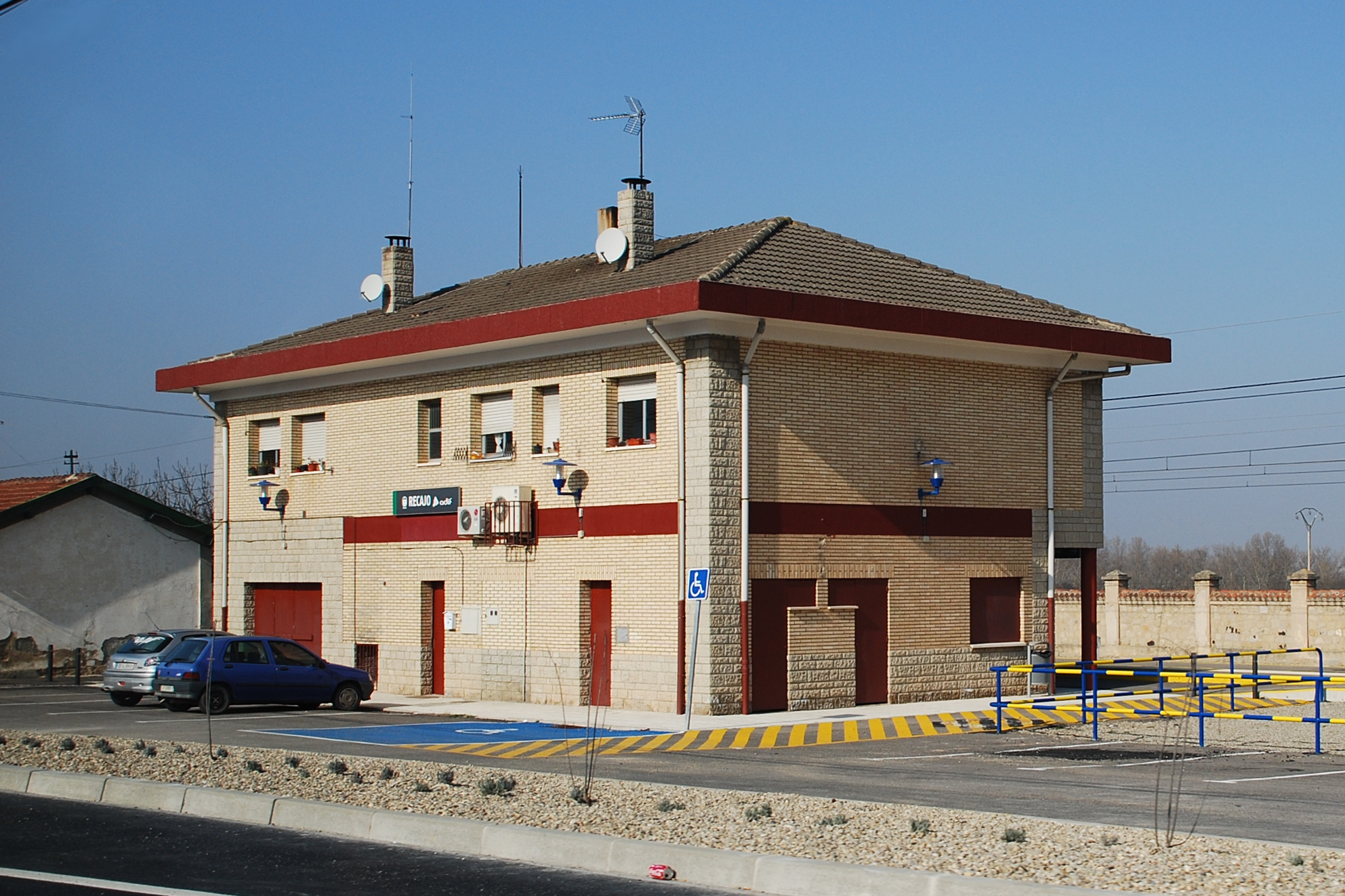
- Recajo railway station

- Location within La Rioja. Recajo (Spain)
- Coordinates: 42°26′58″N 2°20′6″W
- Country: Spain
- Community: La Rioja
- Municipality: Agoncillo
- Elevation: 363 m (1,191 ft)

Population (2011)
  - Total: 97
- Time zone: UTC+1 (CET)
  - Summer (DST): UTC+2 (CEST)
- Postal code: 26160

Recajo is a village within Agoncillo municipality in La Rioja province in northern Spain. It is located south of a bend on the Ebro River, about 4 km to the west of Agoncillo.

Recajo has a population of 91 according to the 2010 census.

== Aerodrome ==
A military aerodrome was built in Recajo in 1923. It was first known as Aeródromo de Recajo, but in 1932 when it was used by the Spanish Republican Air Force its official name was changed to Aeródromo de Agoncillo.

Located about 10 km from Logroño, after 1939 Recajo Air Base housed the Maestranza Aérea de Logroño of the Spanish Air Force with the Regimiento de Bombardeo Nº 15, Escuadrón 110 that operated Heinkel He 111 bombers until the late 1950s.

After the bomber squadrons were phased out, the aerodrome reverted to civilian use as the Logroño-Agoncillo Airport. It now has a smaller airstrip and houses a museum.
