= Agoncillo, La Rioja =

Agoncillo
- Municipality
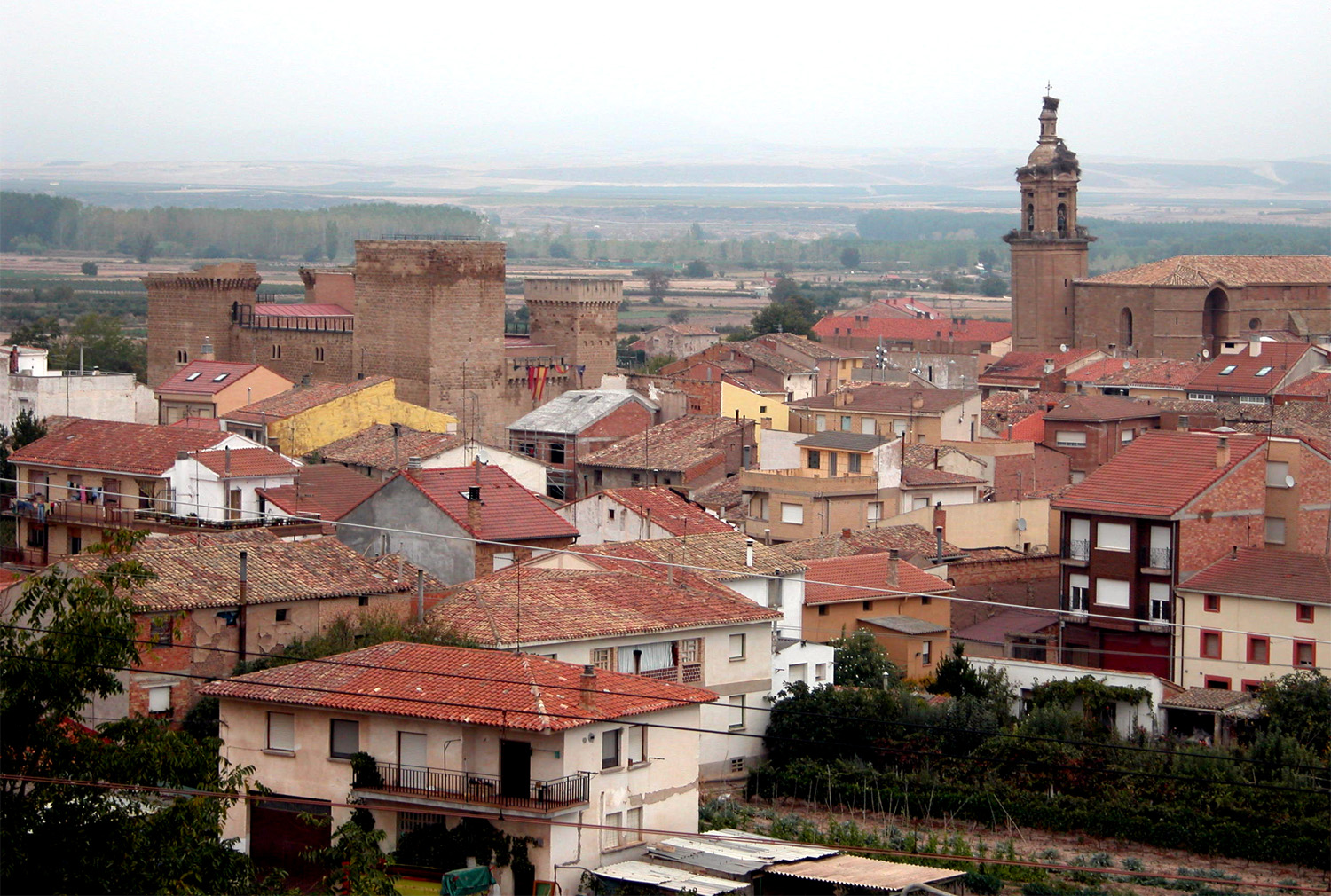

- Coat of arms

- Location within La Rioja.

- Location in La Rioja Location in Spain
- Coordinates: 42°26′47″N 2°17′26″W
- Country: Spain
- Autonomous community: La Rioja
- Comarca: Logroño

Area
  - Total: 34.73 km^{2} (13.41 sq mi)
- Elevation: 346 m (1,135 ft)

Population (2025-01-01)
  - Total: 1,464
- Demonym: agoncillano/a or avionero/a
- Time zone: UTC+1 (CET)
  - Summer (DST): UTC+2 (CET)
- Postal code: 26509
- Website: Official website

Agoncillo (Spanish pronunciation: [aɣonˈθiʎo]) is a town and municipality in La Rioja province in northern Spain.

Club Deportivo Agoncillo is a football team based in Agoncillo.

== History ==
It is believed that the name comes from an ancient Celtic settlement named Egon whose ruins lie near the town. The area was also populated in Ancient Roman times.

=== Aerodrome ===
A military aerodrome was built in Recajo, a town within Agoncillo municipal term, in 1923. It was first known as Aeródromo de Recajo, but in 1932 at the time of the Second Spanish Republic its official name was changed to Aeródromo de Agoncillo. Located about 10 km from Logroño, since 1939 it housed the Maestranza Aérea de Logroño of the Spanish Air Force with the Regimiento de Bombardeo Nº 15, Escuadrón 110 that operated Heinkel He 111 bombers until the late 1950s.

After the bomber squadrons were phased out, the aerodrome reverted to civilian use as the Logroño-Agoncillo Airport. It now has a smaller airstrip and houses a museum.

== Places of interest ==
- Leza River Bridge
- Castle of Aguas Mansas
