= Intermediación Aérea =

Spanish airline

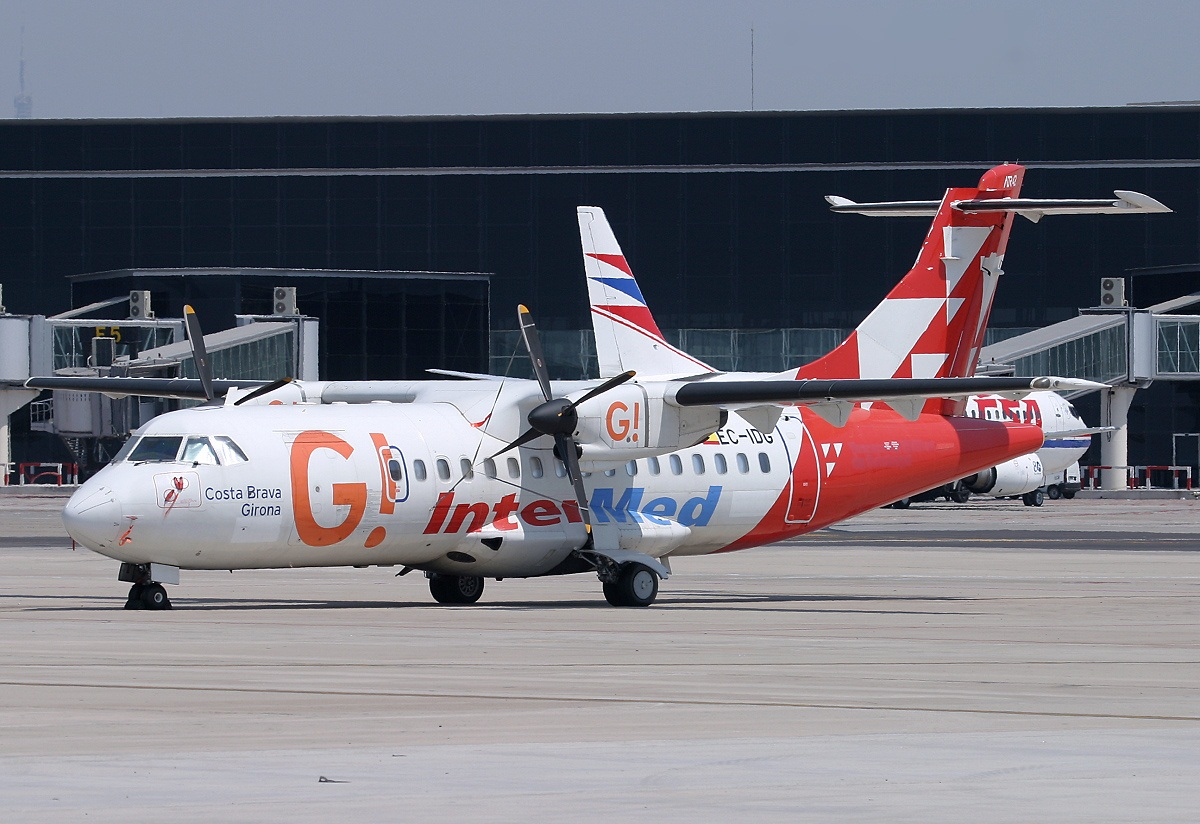
- Intermediación Aérea ATR-42-300 aircraft in Barcelona, 2003
| IATA | ICAO | Call sign |
|---|---|---|
| - | IEA | - |
- Commenced operations: 1997
- Ceased operations: 2005
- Fleet size: Fleet below
- Headquarters: Barcelona, Catalonia, Spain

Intermediación Aérea was an airline based in Barcelona, Catalonia, Spain. It was established in 1997 and operated domestic passenger and cargo services. It ceased operations in 2005.

== Code data ==
- ICAO Code: IEA (not current)

== Fleet ==
Intermediación Aérea used different aircraft along its history.

- 2 ATR 42/300
- 1 Swearingen Merlin II
- 1 Learjet 35A
