= Agoncillo (surname) =

Agoncillo is a surname. Notable people with the surname include:

- Felipe Agoncillo (1859–1941), Filipino lawyer representative to the negotiations in Paris that led to the Treaty of Paris which ended the Spanish–American War in 1898
- Marcela Agoncillo (1860–1946), Filipina seamstress renowned as the Mother of the Philippine Flag
- Ryan Agoncillo (born 1979), Filipino Film and Television actor, model, singer, photographer, and TV host
- Teodoro Agoncillo (1912–1985), 20th-century Filipino historian
