= Air Asturias =

Spanish airline

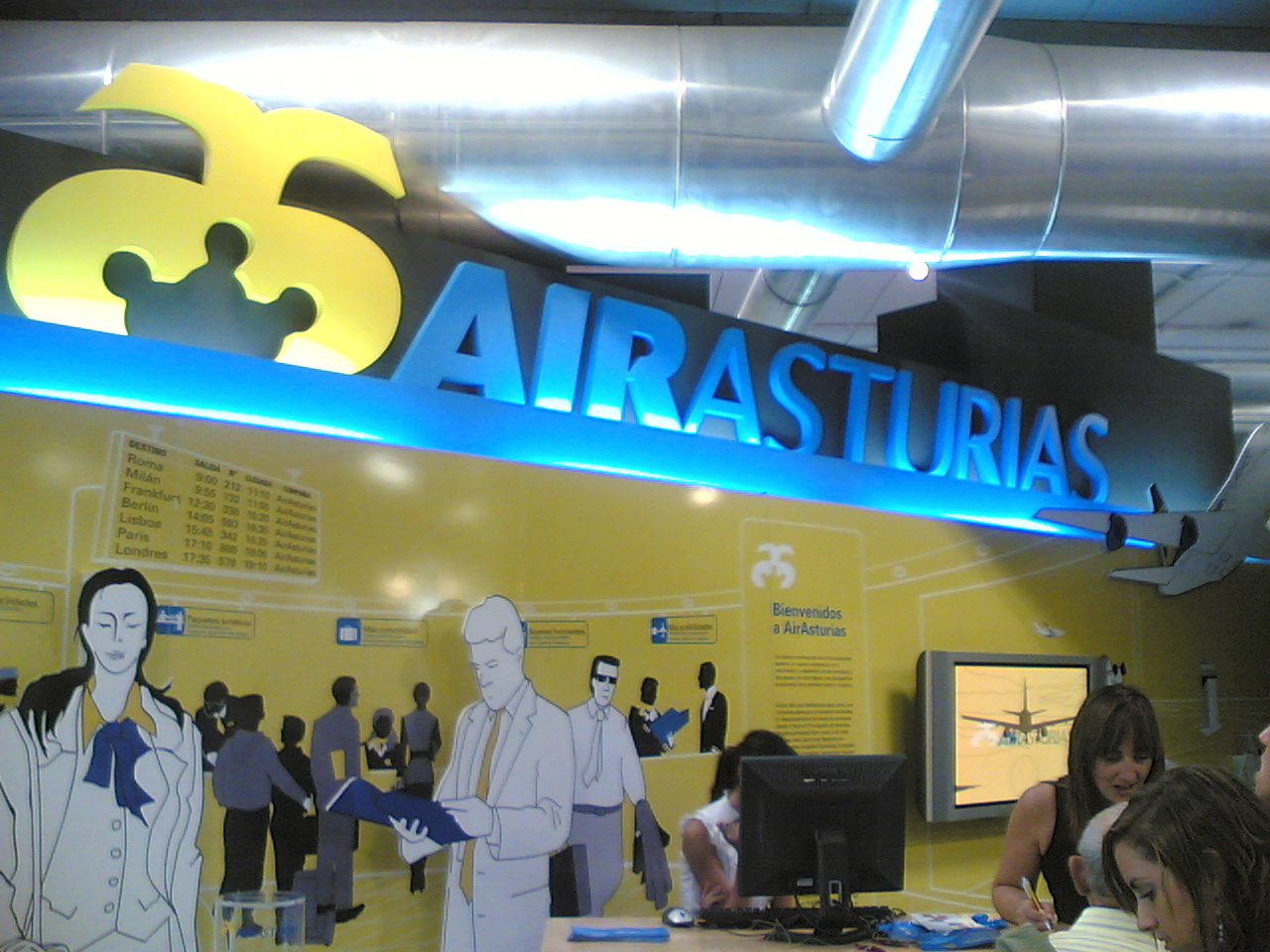
IATA	ICAO	Call sign
-	-	-
- Founded: 2005
- Ceased operations: 2007
- Operating bases: Asturias Airport
- Headquarters: Avilés, Asturias, Spain
- Website: www.pyrenair.es (defunct)

Air Asturias was a short-lived airline based in Oviedo/Asturias, Spain. Its operations were started by LTE in November 2006 and ceased on January 26, 2007.

== History ==
The airline was established on 13 July 2005 and never started its own operations because Air Asturias never obtained its airline certificate. LTE started operations in behalf Air Asturias on 6 November 2006 using LTE's airline certificate and an Airbus A320-214 aircraft. It ceased operations on January 26, 2007.

== Destinations ==
As of January 2007 LTE operated services to the following destinations in behalf of Air Asturias:

- Asturias (Asturias Airport)
- Brussels (Brussels Airport)
- Lisbon (Portela Airport)
- Madrid (Madrid Barajas International Airport)
- Paris (Charles de Gaulle International Airport)
- Rome (Leonardo da Vinci International Airport)

== Fleet ==
Air Asturias fleet never included any plane. The following LTE's plane was painted in Air Asturias color scheme:

- 1 Airbus A320-214 (EC-ISI)
