= Air Spain =

Spanish charter airline

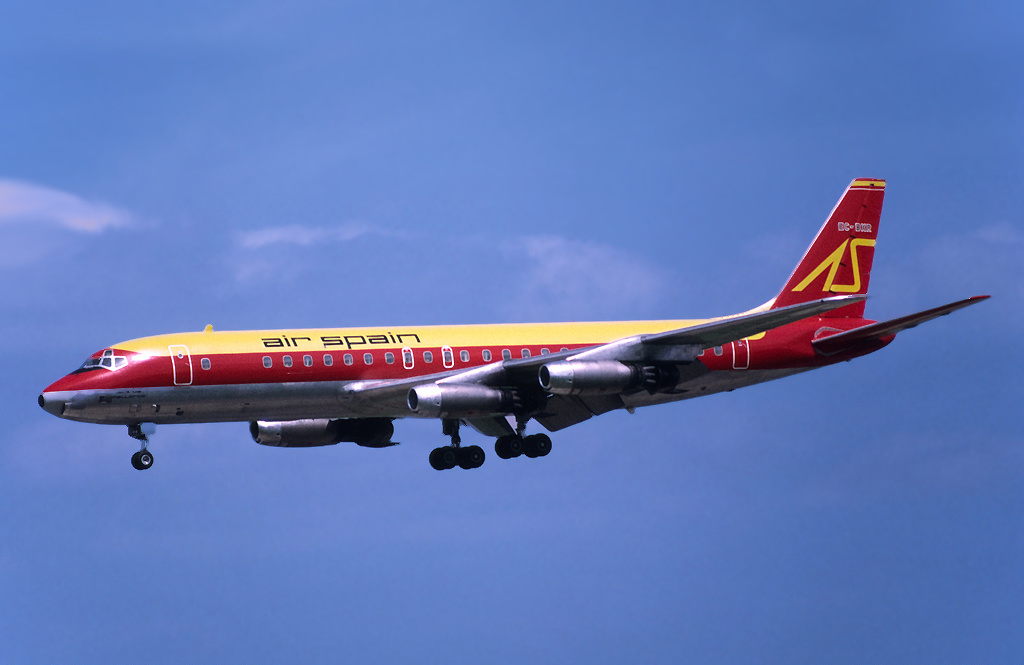
- Air Spain Douglas DC-8
IATA	ICAO	Call sign
JA	-	AIRSPAIN
- Founded: 1965
- Commenced operations: 1967
- Ceased operations: 1975
- Operating bases: Palma de Mallorca Airport
- Headquarters: Palma de Mallorca, Spain
- Key people: Rafael García Valiño

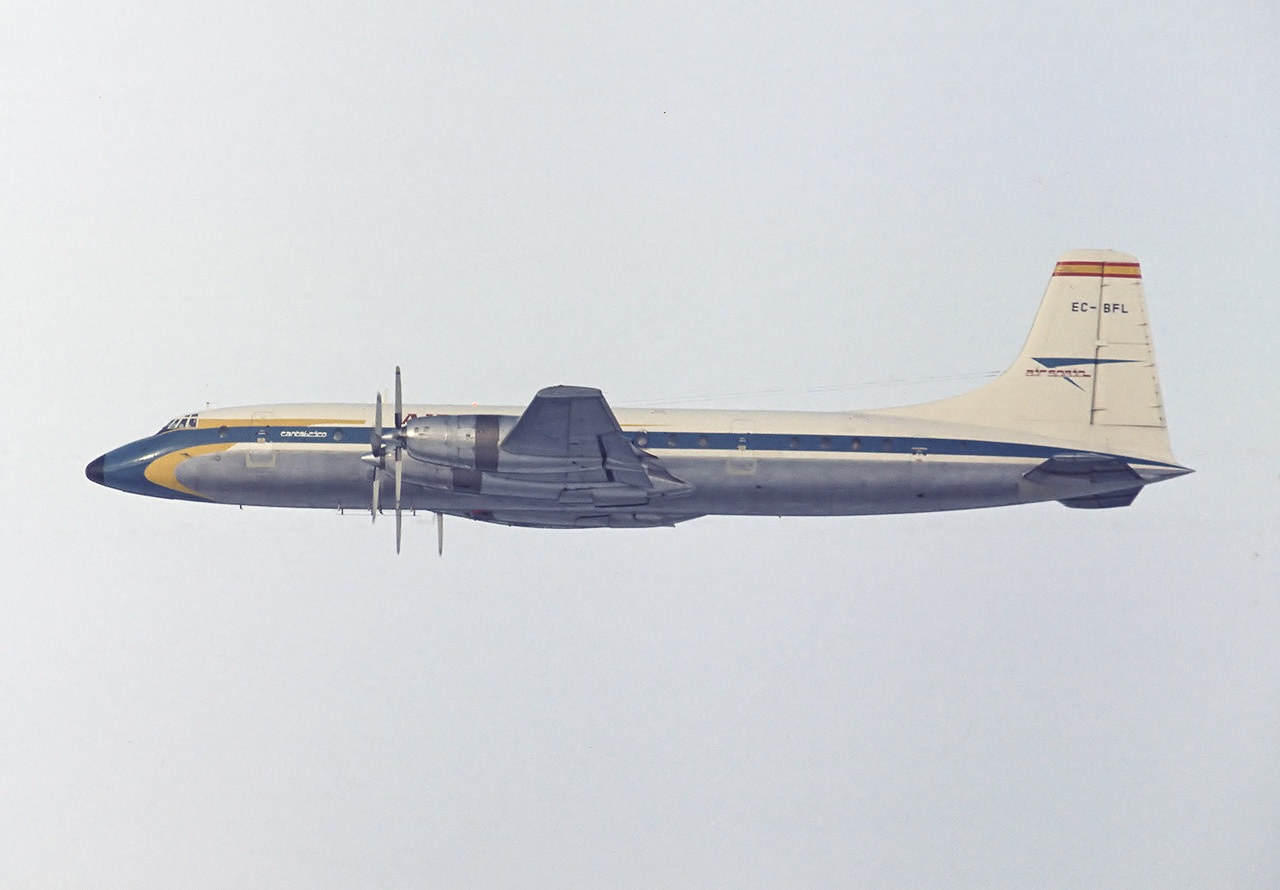
Air Spain Bristol Britannia in flight

Air Spain was a Spanish charter airline that operated from 1965 to 1975. Its main base was Son Sant Joan Airport, in Palma de Mallorca, Balearic Islands.

== History ==
Air Spain was established in January 1965 by Lieutenant General Rafael García Valiño and Banco del Noroeste. Its director general was José Maria Rivero de Aguilar and its director of operations Colonel Carbó. Both directors were relatives of General García Valiño and both were as well from military background, which facilitated their relationship with the Director General of Civil Aviation and made possible the issuing of licenses, a common practice in Francoist Spain.

The airline began operations in May 1967 using Bristol Britannia turboprop aircraft. With the aim of modernizing the fleet, the Britannias were replaced between 1971 and 1973 by Douglas DC-8-20 jets. As a result of increased operation costs owing to the lack of passenger traffic during the winter months and the 1973 oil crisis, the airline ceased operations in February 1975.

== Destinations ==
Air Spain was geared mainly towards tourism in Spain, which at that time was booming. International services were operated between different European cities and the airports of the Balearic Islands, Barcelona, the Canary Islands, Málaga, Alicante and Girona. Flights were on a charter basis, reaching a peak during the summer months in Peninsular Spain destinations, as well as in the Balearic Islands.

== Fleet ==
- 4 Bristol Britannia
- 6 Douglas DC-8-20

== See also ==
- List of defunct airlines of Spain
