= Logroño–Agoncillo Airport =

Airport in La Rioja, Spain

Logroño–Agoncillo Airport Aeropuerto de Logroño-Agoncillo

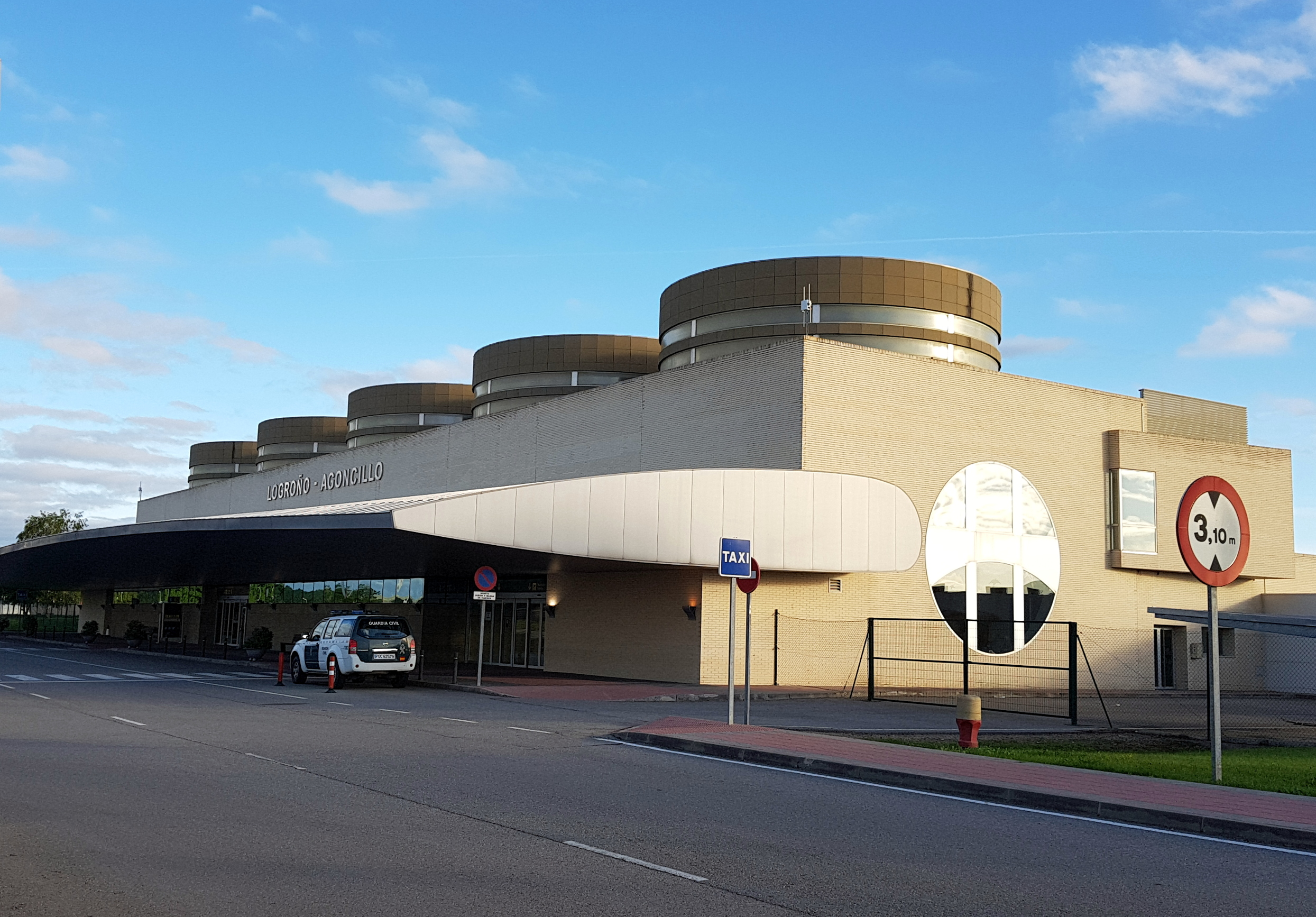
- IATA: RJL; ICAO: LERJ

Summary
- Airport type: Public
- Owner/Operator: AENA
- Location: Logroño, La Rioja, Spain
- Elevation AMSL: 1,156 ft (352 m)
- Coordinates: 42°27′37″N 002°19′13″W

Map
- Location within Spain

Runways
Direction	Length		Surface
Direction	m	ft	Surface
11/29	2,000	6,562	Asphalt

Statistics (2018)
- Passengers: 21,381
- Passenger change 17-18: ▲6.9%
- Movements: 1,376
- Sources: Aena

Logroño–Agoncillo Airport (IATA: RJL, ICAO: LERJ) is the airport serving Logroño in the autonomous community of La Rioja, Spain.

== History ==
This airport is located near Recajo village in the Agoncillo municipal term. It first opened as a military airport in 1923, when it was known as Aeródromo de Recajo. It changed its name to Aeródromo de Agoncillo in 1932 when it was used by the Spanish Republican Air Force. In the late 1950s, the Spanish Air Force ceased most of its operations in Recajo and the aerodrome was transformed to an airport for civilian use.

== Airlines and destinations ==
The following airlines operate regular scheduled and charter flights at Logroño Airport:

Airlines	Destinations
Binter Canarias	Gran Canaria
Iberia	Madrid; Seasonal: Palma de Mallorca
Vueling	Barcelona
