= Líneas Aéreas Canarias =

Spanish airline

Lineas Aereas Canarias (LAC)
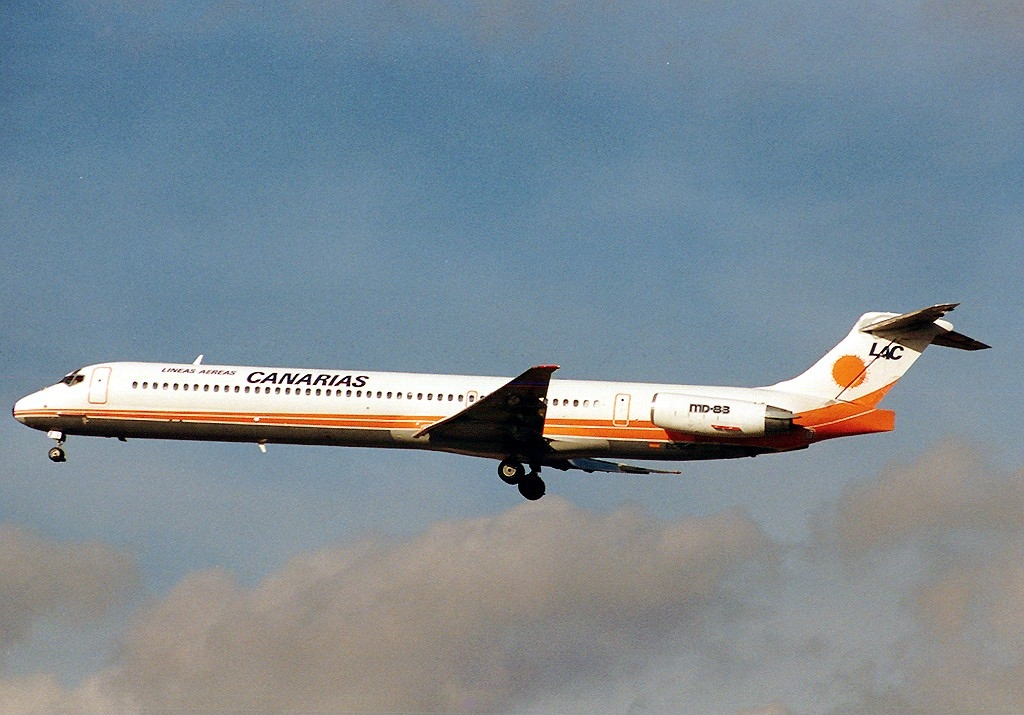
- Lineas Aereas Canarias MD-83
IATA	ICAO	Call sign
L9	LCN	LAC
- Founded: Las Palmas, Canary Islands, Spain
- Commenced operations: 1985
- Ceased operations: 1990
- Operating bases: Gran Canaria Airport
- Fleet size: Fleet below
- Headquarters: Las Palmas de Gran Canaria, Spain

Lineas Aereas Canarias (LAC) was an airline created in 1984 to initially offer connections in the Canary Islands and excursions to Morocco and Madeira. It started operations in 1985 and ceased operations in 1990.

== History ==
=== Foundation ===
Lineas Aereas Canarias LAC, was born in May 1984 in the office of Avda. De Anaga 43, headquarters of the Consignataria de Buques Transbull Canarias S.A. owned by Joaquín Suñer Machado.

The founding partner was Joaquín Suñer Machado, along with other Canarian shareholders such as José Rivero and Mario Machado, both very involved in the start-up.

To obtain the AOC, the Spanish Civil Aviation Authorities required the company to have 100 million pesetas of fully registered and paid-up capital stock. In order to comply with this requirement, other partners were sought, among them Antonio Armas Fernández, president of Lineas Armas, who became president of the airline, incorporating Grupo Armas.

=== Start of Operations ===
It began operations in September 1985 with 2 Vicker Viscounts (EC-DXU and EC-DYC), with a capacity of 82 passengers. These English four-engined aircraft with Roll Royce engines consumed 1,500 liters per hour, and were purchased from British Air Ferries for 100 million pesetas each, which were financed by Infoleasing de Madrid with an annual interest of 21.5%.

It begins to fly as a charter, since it could not be flown otherwise due to the monopoly of Iberia and Aviaco, making flights in the Canary Archipelago between the islands of Fuerteventura, Gran Canaria, Lanzarote and Tenerife, as well as tourist excursions to Marrakech and Madeira. These passengers were brought by TTOOs such as Alpitour, Airtour, Neckerman, Tui, Vacation Club, Mundicolor, Going etc. as well as crew changes from Scan Air airline that flew with the DC-10 aircraft, etc.

The first year, 120,000 passengers were transported with the 2 Vicker Viscount 802 turboprops.

=== Jump to Europe ===
The closure of Spantax in 1988 opened new opportunities for this airline, which is why it entered the European charter market, dismantling the Viscounts and acquiring modern 180-seat MD-83 leases from McDonnell Douglas, of which five were operated. units. The company had significant growth by incorporating a large part of its management team, flight crew and maintenance staff.

There were a multitude of non-stop charter flights throughout Europe, mainly Nordic and Central European countries, with 6-month contracts. So many that McDonnell Douglas reported that in one of those boom years, one of the company's planes set the MD-83 record with the most flying hours in the world.

The company started with auto handling led by José Rivero. Later these ground services in the islands were covered by the subsidiary company Handling Canarias.

=== End of Operations ===
In 1990 it was acquired by Meridiana Compañía Española de Aviación, S.A., joining the Meridiana project (owned by Shah Karim al-Hussayni, the Aga Khan IV) in Spain, together with Universair owned by Grupo Matutes and the air taxi company Euravia.

Throughout 1990 and 1991, most of its personnel and fleet were transferred to Meridiana Air, S.A., the company that developed the aforementioned project.

His claim was to take advantage of the incipient liberalization of regular air transport in Spain. This airline started with a fleet of five MD-83 and four BA-146, operating regular international routes from Valencia and Barcelona. But when this first attempt at regular flights failed to materialize, the company closed its doors in 1992.

== Fleet ==
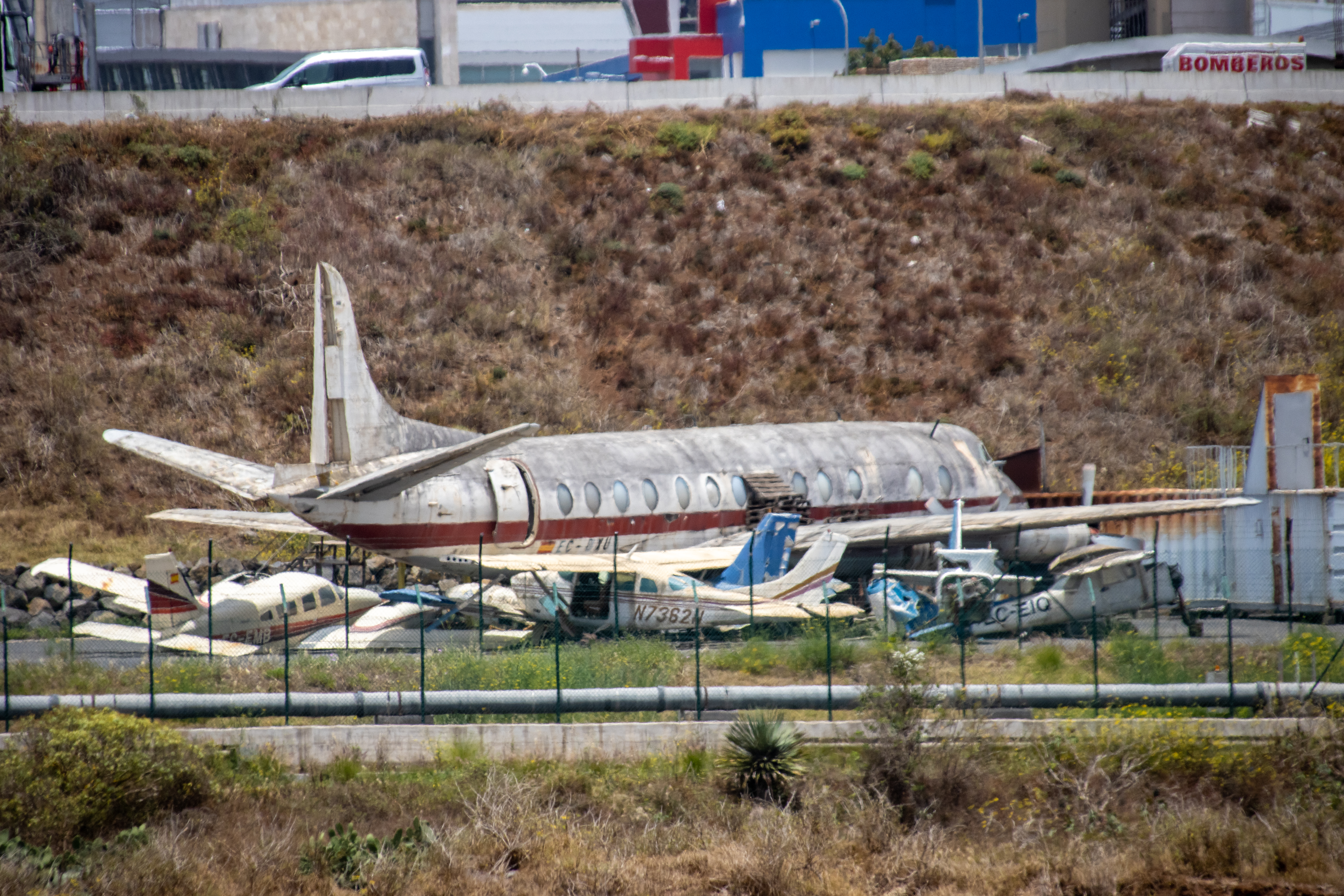
The surviving Viscount 806 at Tenerife North–Ciudad de La Laguna Airport in 2020

These are the LAC aircraft (S / N = Serial Number):

EC-DXU, Vickers Viscount 806

EC-DYC, Vickers Viscount 806

EC-EFU, MD-83, S / N: 1413

EC-EJZ, MD-83, S / N: 1498

EC-EKM, MD-83, S / N: 1502

EC-EKT, MD-83, S / N: 1421

EC-EMG, MD-83, S / N: 1538

EI-BWD, MD-83, S / N: 1414

== Other attempts to operate the brand ==
There was an attempt to relaunch the Lineas Aereas Canarias brand (the original airline that operated between 1985 and 1990) but the project was unsuccessful and the airworthiness certificate was never received. A B-727-2K5 Advanced was hired which was painted and registered as EC-GKL which was finally returned three months later to its owner Safair.

== Codes ==
IATA code: L9

ICAO code: LCN

Callsign: LAC

The call sign throughout Europe was "Canarias", the only place where "LCN" was used in the aeronautical alphabet was in the area controlled by the ACC Canarias.

== See also ==
Annex: Spanish Airlines: https://es.wikipedia.org/wiki/Anexo:Aerol%C3%ADneas_de_España
