= AirClass Airways =

Spanish airline

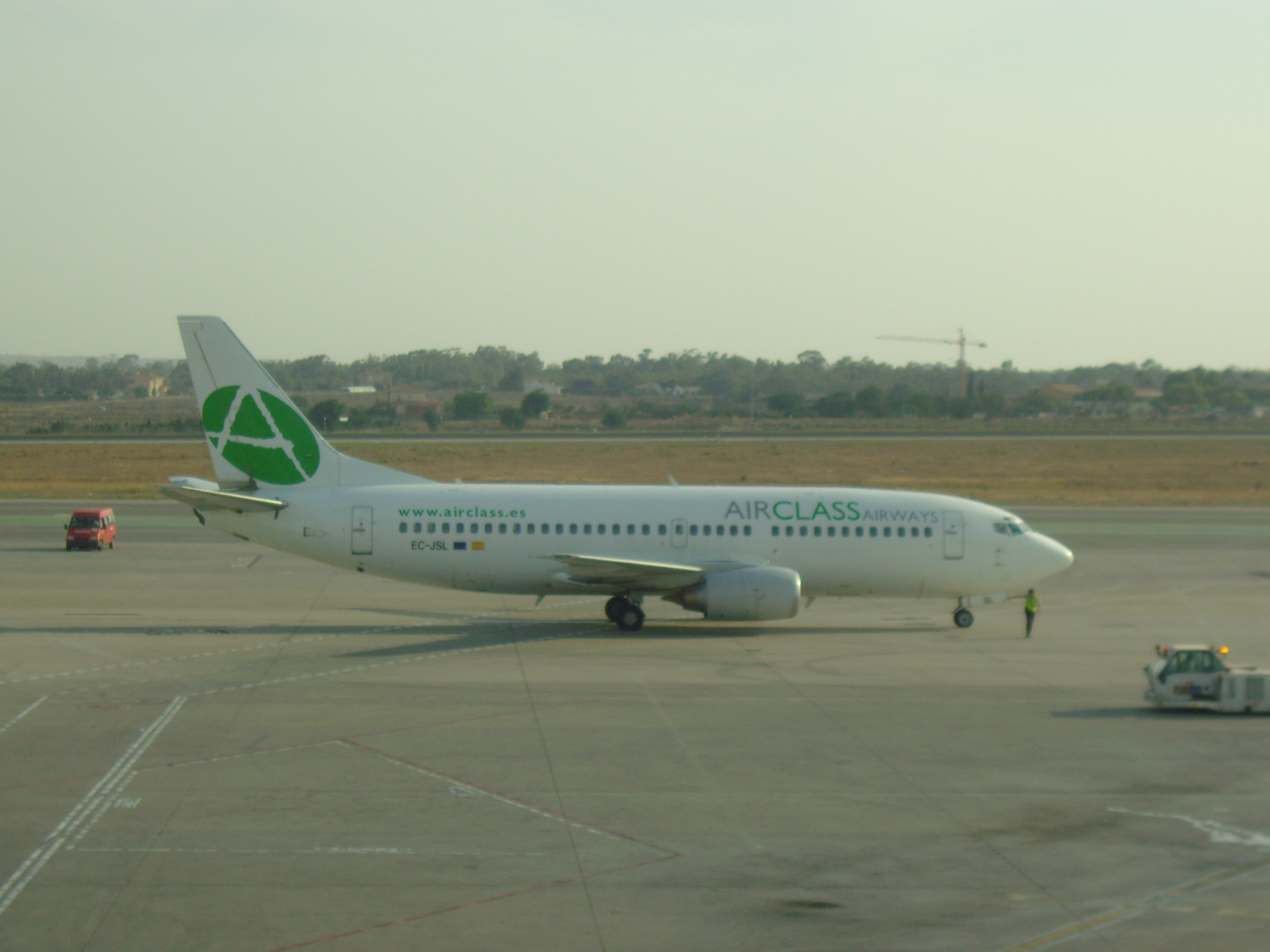
- AirClass Airways Boeing 737-300
IATA	ICAO	Call sign
-	VSG	VISIG
- Founded: 2003
- Ceased operations: 2008
- Hubs: Gran Canaria Airport
- Fleet size: 2
- Headquarters: Las Palmas, Spain
- Website: http://www.airclass.es/

AirClass Airways was an airline based in Las Palmas de Gran Canaria, Canary Islands, Spain. It operated passenger services from Spain, as well as charters and wet lease services. Its main base was Gran Canaria International Airport.

== History ==
The airline started operations in February 2003. It was founded by Canaria Travel as a sister company to the airline Travel Service under the name Visig Operaciones Aéreas. Operations started with a Boeing 737-800 transferred from Travel Service. Visig was closed down in 2005 and in November 2005 the company was acquired by Spanish investment group Airclass and reorganised by Futura International Airways. In May 2006 the company was rebranded as AirClass Airways. It was wholly owned by Airclass and had 48 employees.

AirClass Airways ceased operations in 2008.

== Fleet ==
The AirClass Airways fleet consisted of the following aircraft (as of May 2006):

- 2 Boeing 737-300
