= Top Fly =

Spanish charter airline

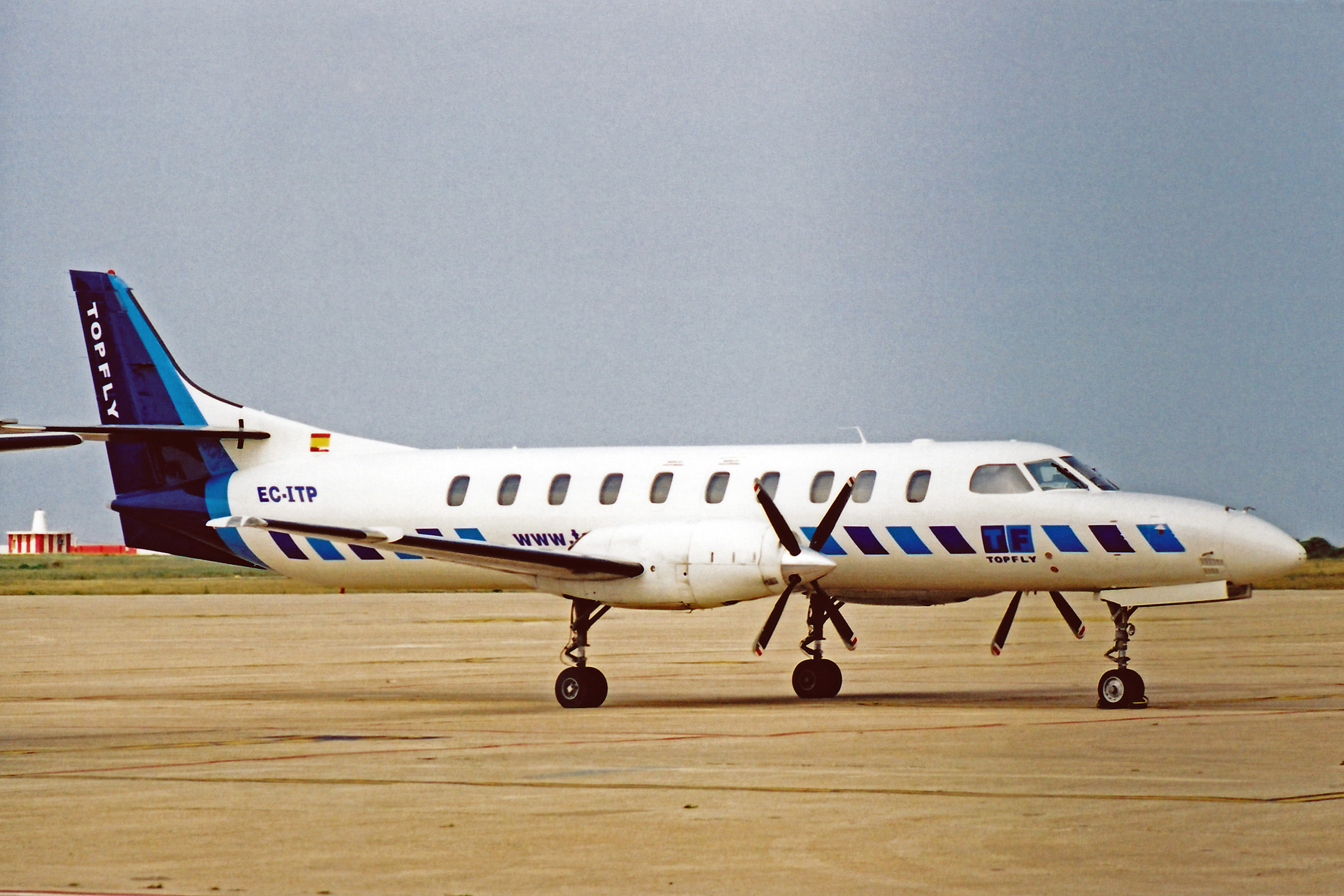
- Topfly Fairchild Swearingen Metro III
IATA	ICAO	Call sign
–	TLY	–
- Commenced operations: 1998; 28 years ago
- Ceased operations: November 2009; 16 years ago
- Fleet size: Fleet below
- Headquarters: Gran Canaria Airport, Spain

Top Fly was a charter airline and passenger and cargo airline based in Gran Canaria, Spain.

== History ==
Top Fly was founded in 1998. The company also operated a pilot training schools, one based in Sabadell Airport and another in Monflorite, Huesca Airport.

Top Fly operated both charter and air taxi services, as well as air medical services on demand to all European and Africa airports. Top Fly ceased commercial operations in November 2009. CanaryFly, a new airline, was founded by former Top Fly employees, inheriting some of the former Top Fly fleet. The company continued to trade as a Pilot Training school but in June 2012 went bankrupt.

CanaryFly began operations on the former Top Fly network utilising an ATR 42-300 and the former Top Fly Swearingen Metroliner aircraft.

== Destinations ==
Top Fly operated the following destinations:

=== Africa ===
- Mauritania
  - Nouadhibou – Nouadhibou International Airport
  - Nouakchott – Nouakchott International Airport
- Morocco
  - Agadir – Al Massira Airport
  - Dakhla – Dakhla Airport
  - Laayoune – Hassan I Airport

=== Europe ===
- Spain
  - Canary Islands
    - Fuerteventura – Fuerteventura Airport
    - Lanzarote – Arrecife Airport
    - Las Palmas – Gran Canaria Airport Hub
    - Tenerife – Tenerife North Airport
    - Tenerife – Tenerife South Airport

== Fleet ==
The Top Fly fleet included the following aircraft as of 23 July April 2011.

- 3 Fairchild Swearingen Metro III SA227BC heavy, 19 passenger or Cargo/Combi 16000 lbs MTOW,
- 2 Fairchild Swearingen Metro II SA226AT 19 passenger or Cargo/Combi 12500 lbs MTOW,
- 2 ATR 42-300 52 passenger.
- 53 Single or Twin piston engine training aircraft, including: Cessna 172N, Cessna 172R (G1000), Cessna 172 RG, Piper PA34 Seneca, Tecnam P2002 JF and Tecnam P2006T.
