= Angelina Abbona =

Argentine jurist

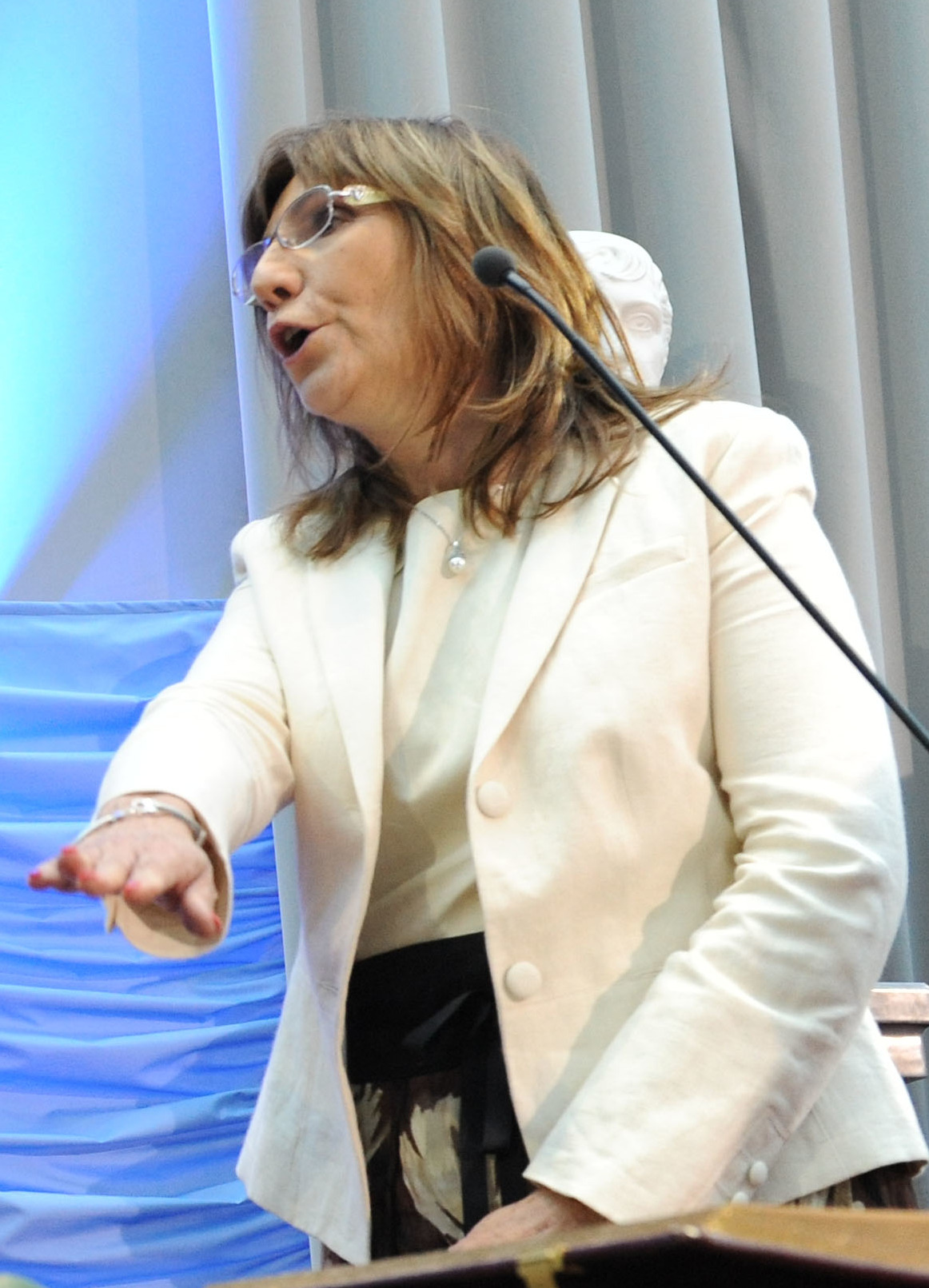

National Treasury Attorney of Argentina
- In office 10 December 2011 – 10 December 2015
- President: Cristina Fernández de Kirchner
- Preceded by: Joaquín Pedro da Rocha
- Succeeded by: Carlos Balbín

Personal details
- Born: Angelina María Esther Abbona; 8 November 1951 (age 73); San Rafael, Argentina
- Political party: Marxist–Leninist Communist; Front for Victory
- Spouse: Enrique Mengarelli
- Education: National University of Córdoba
- Occupation: Jurist

Angelina María Esther Abbona (born 8 November 1951) is an Argentine jurist who served as the country's National Treasury Attorney from 10 December 2011 to 10 December 2015, during the administration of Cristina Fernández de Kirchner.

== Biography ==
Angelina Abbona was born in San Rafael on 8 November 1951, and spent her childhood and adolescence in the city of Mendoza.

During the 1970s, she attended the National University of Córdoba. She was a member of the Marxist–Leninist Communist student group – part of the Maoist Revolutionary Communist Party (PCR) – where she met the Cordoban student Carlos Zannini. She earned her law degree in 1976. The following year, together with her husband, Enrique "Mengueche" Mengarelli and other militants of his group, Abbona moved to Río Gallegos to escape from persecution by general Luciano Benjamín Menéndez under the country's civil-military dictatorship. A few years later, Zannini would follow them.

Abbona practiced law in Río Gallegos. Through Zannini – who had created and led a sector of Kirchnerism called the Línea Córdoba – she met Néstor Kirchner. When he became governor of Santa Cruz Province, she was appointed state prosecutor. She served in the post for eight years.

Her close friendship with the Minister of Social Development, Alicia Kirchner, led to her being appointed internal auditor of the Ministry of Social Development in 2004. She returned to public management in Santa Cruz with governor Daniel Peralta, who appointed her president of the Court of Accounts in 2007.

On 22 December 2010, in Buenos Aires, Abbona replaced Joaquín Pedro da Rocha in an ad honórem appointment as Argentine National Treasury Attorney – head of the State Lawyers Corps – a position with ministerial hierarchy and reporting directly to the president. She was the first woman to hold the post. Her appointment was ratified on 10 December 2011 by decree of President Cristina Fernández de Kirchner. In office, she promoted Expediente 36.549/2012 – HSBC Bank Argentina, under opinion 83/2008 of the National Treasury Attorney. She also initiated the investigation of the Argentine Rural Society for the irregular sale of a property in 1982. She promoted the complaint together with Juan Manuel Abal Medina Jr., head of the Cabinet of Ministers, against judge Luis Antonio Armella, head of Federal Court No. 1 of Quilmes, because a group of companies linked to him had obtained valuable contracts for the cleanup of the Matanza River basin without bidding. The case eventually reached the Council of Magistracy, which handed down an opinion proposing the elevation of Armella to a jury of prosecution.

In 2010, Abbona criminally denounced the US hedge fund Burford Capital and the Spanish Grupo Marsans, former concessionaire of Aerolíneas Argentinas and Austral, for alleged "procedural fraud". In 2015, she filed a complaint against Burford Capital, Grupo Marsans, and the law firm Alejandro Fargosi and Associates for an alleged fraud due to the lawsuit they filed against the Argentine government for the expropriation of Aerolíneas Argentinas and Austral. Per an account in the Spanish newspaper El País,

Argentina argued in its criminal complaint that not only did it reject the tourist group's claim before ICSID, but that Marsans is a "debtor of the Argentine Republic" for "having left the airline in a ruinous situation," according to the Argentine Treasury Attorney, Angelina Abbona, who threatened to claim 1 billion from Marsans for its management of Aerolíneas.

Abbona, together with the Prosecutor Against Economic Crime and Money Laundering, Carlos Gonella, filed a criminal complaint for alleged fraud against the Argentine State against the owners of Marsans, including Gerardo Díaz Ferrán, who were convicted by a Spanish court as "perpetrators criminally responsible for a crime against the Public Treasury" for evading 99 million euros of corporate tax in 2001, when Air Comet bought Aerolíneas Argentinas. Abbona and Gonella also filed a complaint with the International Center for Settlement of Investment Disputes (ICSID) against the Spanish group for damages caused by the alleged deficient administration and the ruin of Aerolíneas.

== Prosecution for coverup ==
Abbona was prosecuted in 2016 by federal judge Luis Rodríguez for failing to denounce crimes "ex officio", and for "hindering the investigations necessary to determine the responsibility of Grupo Marsans in the clearing out of Aerolíneas Argentinas." He ordered 1 million pesos (US$20,000) of her assets seized in conjunction with the case. This ruling was confirmed by Chamber Two of the federal courts in October 2017.

== Positions held ==
- Legal advisor of the National Highway Directorate's Santa Cruz district
- 1983–1985: Legal advisor to the Undersecretariat of Commerce, Mining, and Maritime Interests, Ministry of Economy and Public Works of Santa Cruz Province
- 1987–1991: Legal advisor to the Municipality of Río Gallegos
- 1991–1992: Head of the Administrative Department of the Legal Area, Public Services Society of Santa Cruz Province
- 1992–1995: Manager of the Public Services Society of Santa Cruz Province
- 1995–2003: State prosecutor of Santa Cruz Province
- 2003–2007: Titular internal auditor of the Ministry of Social Development
- 2007–2010: President of the Honorable Court of Accounts of Santa Cruz Province
- 2011–2015: National Treasury Attorney of Argentina
