= Antonio Garamendi =

Spanish businessman (born 1958)

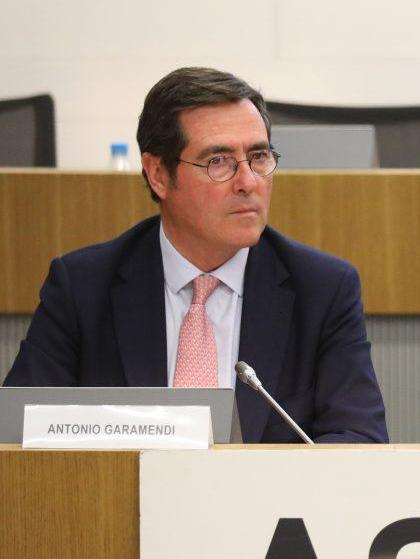
- Born: Antonio Garamendi Lecanda; 8 February 1958 (age 67); Getxo (Basque Country, Spain)
- Occupation: businessperson
- Known for: CEOE Chairperson

Antonio Garamendi Lecanda (Getxo, 8 February 1958) is a Spanish businessman, current president of the Spanish Confederation of Business Organizations (CEOE). He previously held the position of treasurer of the CEOE and was also the president of the Spanish metal federation (ConfeMetal).

== Biography ==
His father, Rafael Garamendi Aldecoa, was president of the Nervión Maritime shipping company and advisor to industries such as Tubos Reunidos and Aldecoa.

He graduated in law from the University of Deusto. From a very young age, he dedicated himself to the business world, focusing on three areas: family business, projects promoted by himself (small and medium-sized companies) and presence on various boards of directors and advisory boards of large companies (Red Eléctrica de España, Bankoa, La Equitativa, Babcock & Wilcox, Albura and Tubos Reunidos).

He was also president of Handyman and of Grupo Negocios. His private business activity focuses on the metal, construction, real estate, insurance and hospitality sectors, participating as a shareholder or director in different companies.

However, the greatest notoriety of him came from the field of business organizations. He began with the foundation of the Association of Young Entrepreneurs of the Basque Country, from which he rose to the presidency of the Spanish Confederation of Young Entrepreneurs (Ceaje), later to that of the Ibero-American Confederation of Young Entrepreneurs, and finally assumed the Presidency of the Spanish Confederation of Small and Medium Enterprises (CEPYME). He has been a member of the Board of Directors of the Vizcaya Business Confederation, of the Vizcaya Metal Executive Commission, of the Vizcaya Chamber of Commerce and a member of the Chamber of Vizcaya property. Within the CEOE, he has held various important positions, such as the treasury and the presidency of the Metal Federation (Confemetal).

On 20 November 2018 he was elected president of the Spanish Confederation of Business Organizations, replacing Joan Rosell who had defeated him in 2014. He was re-elected on 23 November 2022, against Virginia Guínda.

In 2023, the CEOE changed the status of its president, who invoiced his services as a freelancer and who will now become on the organization's payroll. He receives a remuneration of almost 400,000 euros per year for this function.
