= Air Madrid =

Spanish airline

IATA	ICAO	Call sign
NM	DRD	ALADA AIR
- Founded: 2003
- Ceased operations: 16 December 2006
- Hubs: Madrid Barajas Airport
- Fleet size: 10
- Parent company: Grupo Marsans
- Headquarters: San Sebastián de los Reyes, Community of Madrid, Spain
- Key people: José Luis Carrillo, President
- Website: www.airmadrid.com

Air Madrid Líneas Aéreas S.A. was an airline headquartered in San Sebastián de los Reyes, Community of Madrid, Spain, operating services to Spain, Tenerife, Mexico, South America, Central America, Europe and Israel. It suspended its operations on 15 December 2006, leaving more than 330,000 passengers stranded in Latin America and Spain. Air Comet took over the Latin American routes, but has now ceased operations as well.

== History ==
The airline was established in 2003 and, in May 2004, started operations with the delivery of two Airbus A330-200 aircraft. It was owned by Celuisma (20%), Hotusa (20%), Herpil (12.5%), Catalonia Hoteles (10%), Quo Viajes (10%), Viajes Eroski (10%) and others. Air Madrid planned to start a new short-haul scheduled arm to provide feeder traffic to its long-haul flights from Madrid. It also had talks to lease five Airbus A320 aircraft for services to Amsterdam, Frankfurt, London, Milan and Paris.

In September 2006, the company had started experiencing longer-than-usual delays and several cancellations, with delays of up to 60 hours on flights to Latin America. As reported in El País, most of these delays were triggered by Spanish aviation authorities for safety reasons, refusing to allow certain aircraft to operate due to poor maintenance. After an investigation, the Dirección General de Aviación Civil recommended limiting Air Madrid's flights or suspending their licence altogether.

The International Air Transport Association (IATA) announced that Air Madrid was suspended from IATA operations worldwide on December 15, 2006, following confirmation that the airline had ceased operations. On 16 December 2006, Air Madrid suspended all flights, leaving thousands of people stranded, as a consequence of a Spanish government investigation into its operations and due to constant customer complaints regarding poor service, which resulted in the cancellation of its operational licence.

Air Comet signed a deal with the Spanish government to take over the Latin American routes formerly operated by Air Madrid. The airline took on 53% of the Air Madrid workforce and agreed to fly back stranded passengers.

== Destinations ==
- Madrid to Bogotá, Bucharest, Buenos Aires, Cartagena, Fortaleza, Guayaquil, Lima, London Gatwick, Milan, Panama City, Paris, Rome, Mahon, Palma de Mallorca, Ibiza, Quito, San José, Costa Rica, Santa Cruz de Tenerife, Santiago, Tel Aviv and Toluca (Mexico City alternate airport).
- Barcelona to Bogotá, Bucharest, Buenos Aires, Cartagena, Fortaleza, Guayaquil, Milan, Santa Cruz de Tenerife, Las Palmas de Gran Canaria and Santiago

== Fleet ==
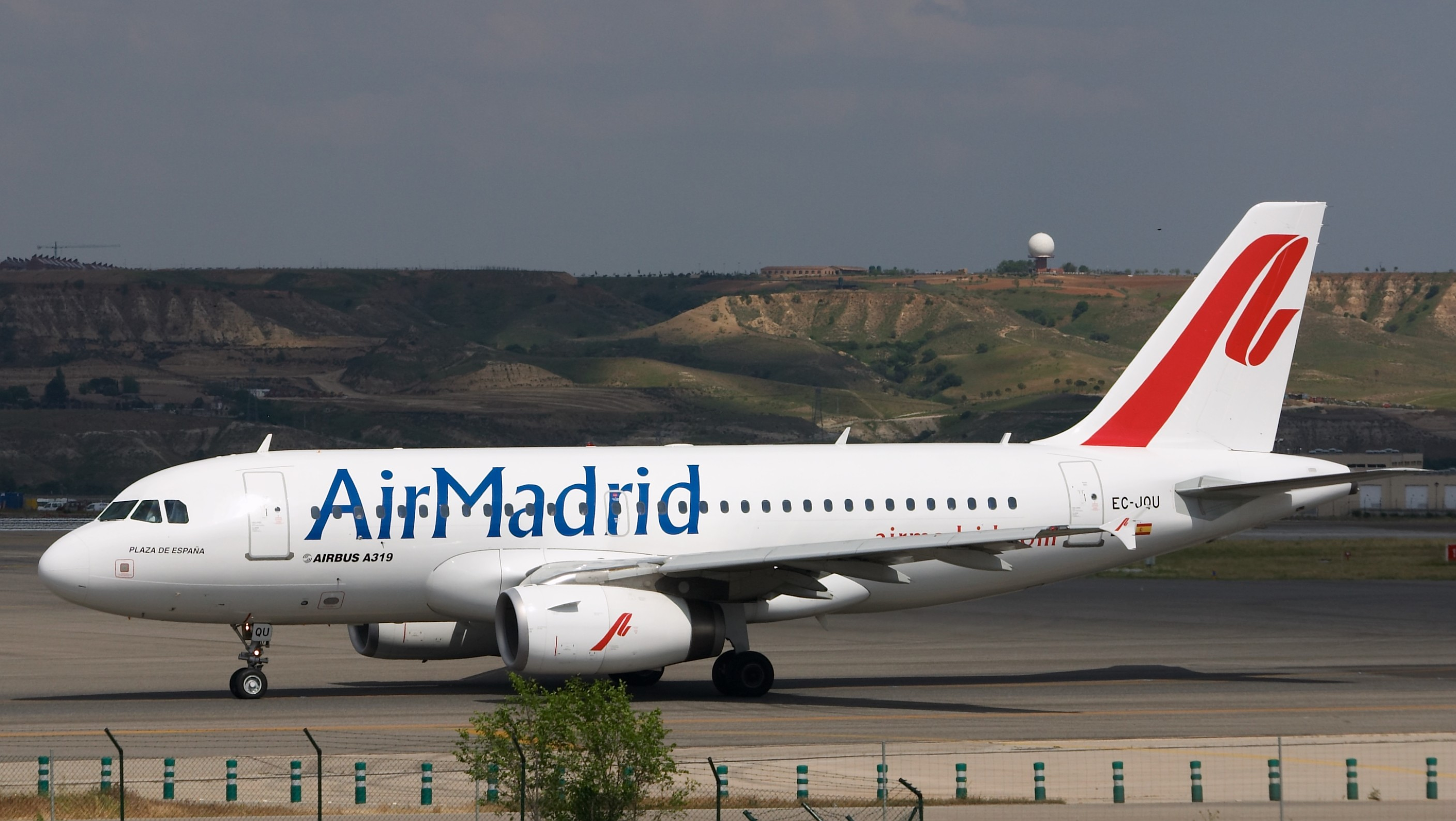
Air Madrid Airbus A319.

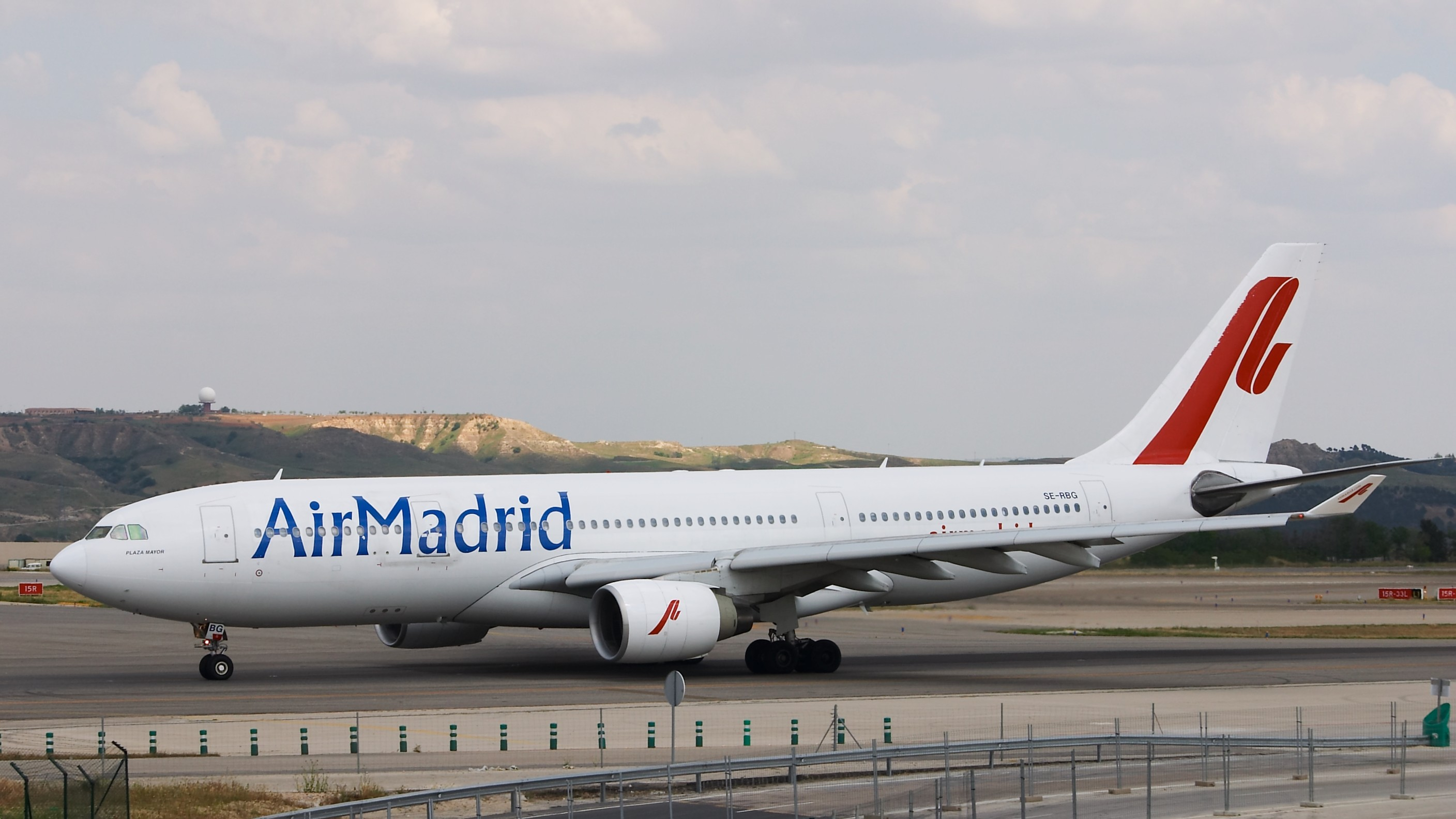
Air Madrid Airbus A330.

The Air Madrid fleet consisted of the following aircraft (as of November 2006):

- 1 Airbus A310-300 (to Air Transat as C-GTSX)
- 2 Airbus A319-132 (both going to Sichuan Airlines)
- 3 Airbus A330-200 (SE-RBG back to Novair), (EC-IYN and EC-IYB going to Air Comet "Viajes Pascual")
- 2 Airbus A330-300 (OO-SFW to Brussels Airlines), (the other going to Air Asia)
- 1 Airbus A340-300 Going to Air Comet
