= Juan Manuel Abal Medina Jr. =

Argentine politician and author

Juan Manuel Abal-Medina
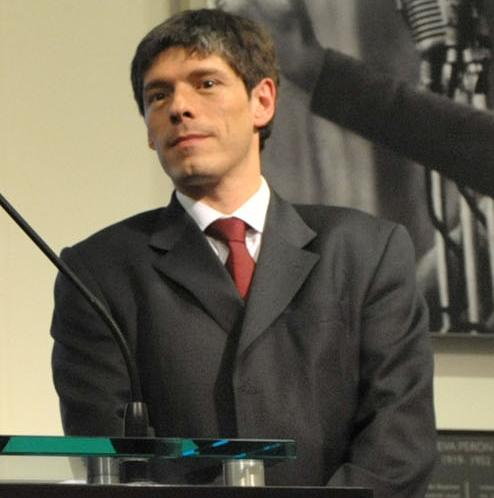

National Senator
- In office 29 December 2014 – 10 December 2017
- Preceded by: Aníbal Fernández
- Constituency: Buenos Aires

Chief of the Cabinet of Ministers
- In office 10 December 2011 – 20 November 2013
- President: Cristina Fernández de Kirchner
- Preceded by: Aníbal Fernández
- Succeeded by: Jorge Capitanich

Communications Secretary
- In office 12 January 2011 – 10 December 2011
- President: Cristina Fernández de Kirchner
- Preceded by: Enrique Albistur
- Succeeded by: Alfredo Scoccimarro

Secretary of Public Management
- In office 1 August 2008 – 12 January 2011
- President: Cristina Fernández de Kirchner
- Preceded by: Daniel Fihman
- Succeeded by: Juan José Ross

Personal details
- Born: 5 May 1968 (age 58) Buenos Aires, Argentina
- Party: Evita Movement; Justicialist Party
- Other political affiliations: Front for Victory (2003–2017)
- Education: University of Buenos Aires; Latin American Social Sciences Institute

Juan Manuel Abal-Medina (born 5 May 1968) is an Argentine academic, political scientist, and author. He was appointed Communications Secretary by President Cristina Fernández de Kirchner in 2011, and served as Chief of the Cabinet of Ministers of Argentina from December 2011 to November 2013. He was a national senator for Buenos Aires Province from 2014 to 2017.

== Early life ==
Abal Medina was born in Buenos Aires. His father, Juan Manuel Abal Medina, served as Secretary General of the Peronist Movement in the early 1970s, and was the last representative of General Juan Perón before his return to Argentina in 1973. The elder Abal Medina's brother, Fernando Abal Medina, was a co-founder of the Montoneros guerrilla organization. His family's political activities resulted in their persecution during the dictatorship installed in 1976, and in 1982, they sought exile in Mexico.

Upon Abal Medina's return to Argentina, he enrolled at the University of Buenos Aires, and earned a licenciatura degree in Political Science in 1994. He received a fellowship from the National Research Institute in 1995, and earned a PhD in Political Science in 2000 at the Latin American Social Sciences Institute, in Mexico City. He subsequently taught in his discipline as a tenured professor at his alma mater, at the National University of Quilmes, the National University of General San Martín, and the University of San Andrés. Abal Medina published an extensive bibliography, beginning with his 2001 study of electoral history in Argentina, El federalismo electoral argentino, as well as articles in numerous political science journals.

== Political career ==
He entered public service in 2000 as Director of the National Public Administration Institute under President Fernando de la Rúa, and in 2001 was appointed Political and Legislative Director for Buenos Aires Mayor Aníbal Ibarra, later serving Ibarra as Director of Strategic Planning from 2003 to 2005. He was appointed Undersecretary of Public Management, a presidential advisory position, by Néstor Kirchner in October 2005, and in December 2007, was promoted to the post of Secretary of the same office by Kirchner's wife and successor, Cristina Kirchner. He was given the additional post of Assistant Chief of the Cabinet of Ministers in August 2008.

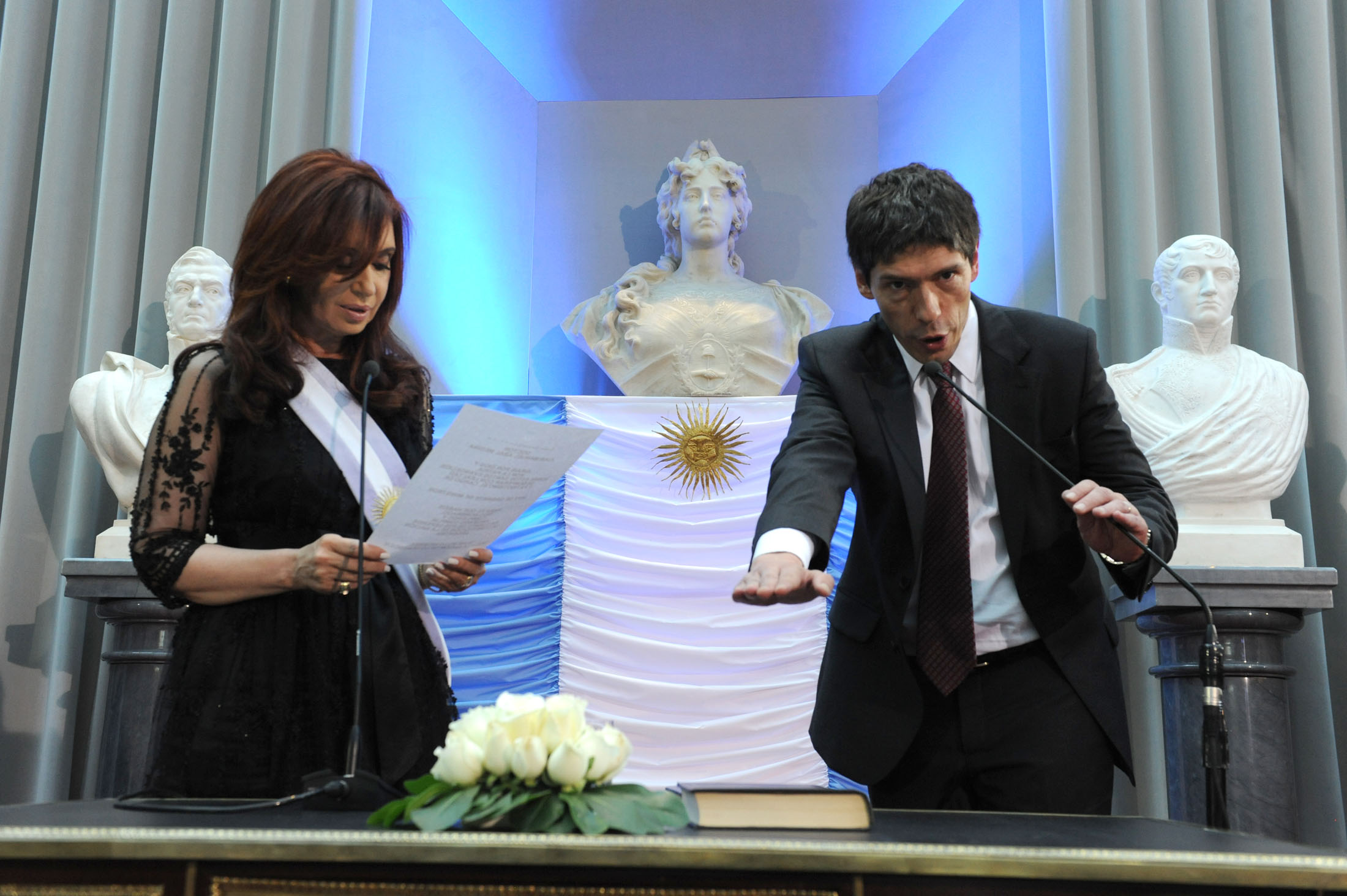
Abal Medina sworn in as Chief of the Cabinet of Ministers of Argentina, 10 December 2011

The latter appointment coincided with the President's replacement of Alberto Fernández for Sergio Massa at the powerful Cabinet Chief's post. The administration had suffered an unexpected political defeat at the height of the 2008 Argentine government conflict with the agricultural sector, when a hike in export tariffs failed in the Argentine Senate by one vote. Abal Medina had become among the staunchest supporters of Kirchnerism, and Abal Medina's promotion within the Casa Rosada was seen by local political observers as both a validation of his skill as a political strategist during a time of retrenchment, as well as the emergence of a potential leader for the party's future.

Abal Medina served concurrently as congressional political adviser to Néstor Kirchner after the latter's election to the Lower House in 2009, as well as during Kirchner's tenure as Secretary General of UNASUR. Kirchner's death in October 2010 would be followed by his adviser's appointment as Communications Secretary by President Cristina Kirchner in January 2011. The post made him the chief spokesperson for the President, and gave him aegis over the public relations offices of other important government bureaus. These included the Social Security and Revenue Agencies, as well as the President's new media initiative Fútbol para Todos ("Football for All"), a US$170 million program for the free broadcast of association football matches in Argentina.

In 2011, President Cristina Fernández de Kirchner named Abal Medina as Cabinet Chief for her newly elected term to replace Aníbal Fernández, who was elected to a seat in the Argentine Senate.

In 2012, Medina and National Treasury Attorney Angelina Abbona filed a complaint against judge Luis Antonio Armella, head of Federal Court No. 1 of Quilmes, because a group of companies linked to him had obtained valuable contracts for the cleanup of the Matanza River basin without bidding.

== Bibliography ==
- El federalismo electoral argentino. Sobrerrepresentación, reforma política y gobierno dividido en la Argentina (EUDEBA, 2001), with Ernesto Calvo.
- El asedio a la política. Los partidos latinoamericanos en la era neoliberal (Homo Sapiens, 2002), with Marcelo Cavarozzi.
- Los partidos políticos: ¿un mal necesario? (Claves para Todos, 2004).
- La muerte y la resurrección de la Representación Política (Fondo De Cultura Económica, 2004).
- Los senderos de la nueva izquierda partidaria (Prometeo, 2006).
- Evaluando el desempeño democrático de las instituciones políticas argentinas (Prometeo, 2007).
- Participación y Control ciudadanos: el funcionamiento de los mecanismos institucionales electorales y societales de accountability vertical en la Argentina (UBACyT/UNSAM/FIDENTIA, 2007), with Marcelo Cavarozzi.

Political offices
Preceded by Aníbal Fernández	Chief of the Cabinet of Ministers; 2011–2013	Succeeded by Jorge Capitanich
