= Liberation Party =

Liberation Party Partido de la Liberación
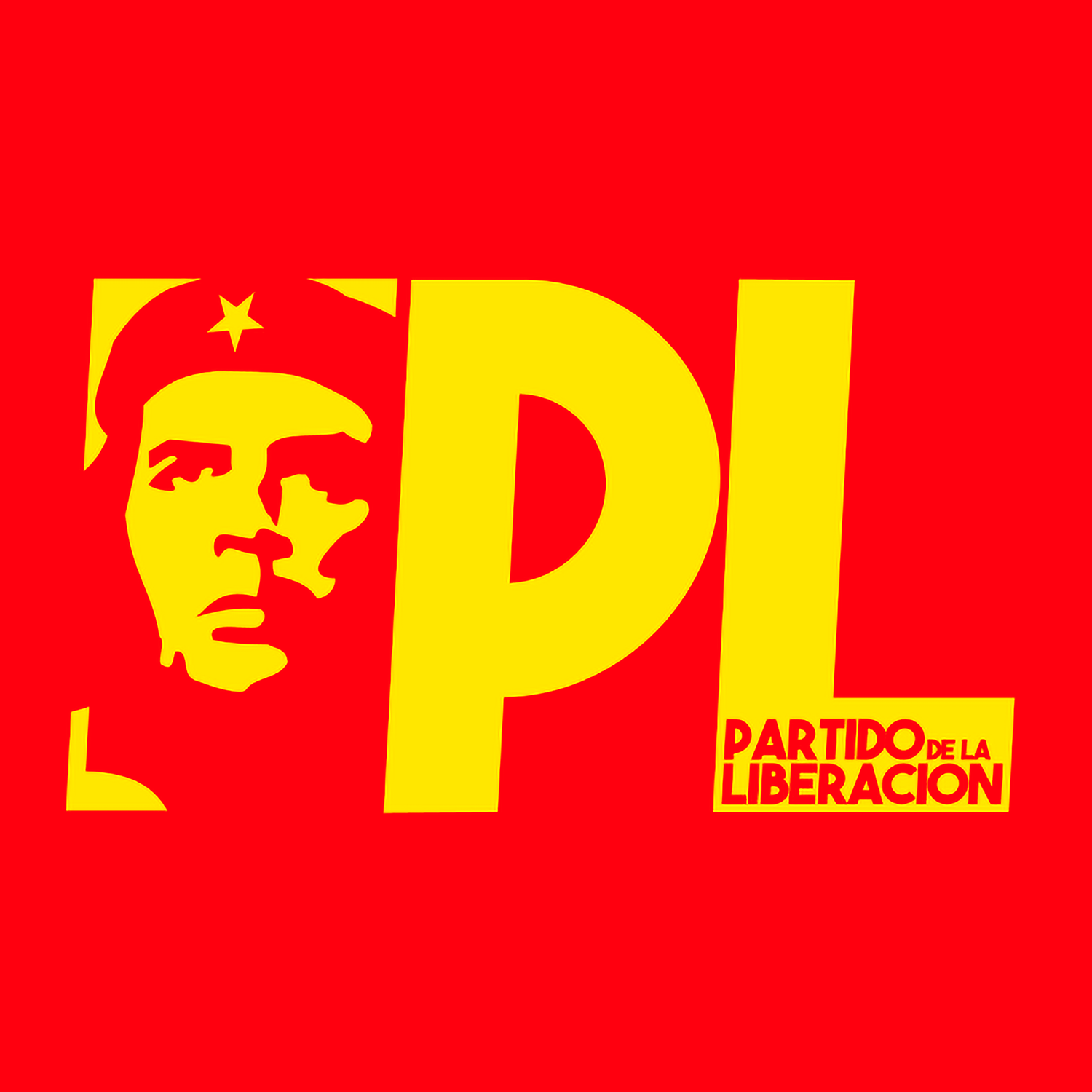
- President: Sergio Ortiz
- Founded: April 5, 1965
- Headquarters: Buenos Aires, Argentina
- Newspaper: Liberación
- Youth wing: TUPAC
- Ideology: Communism; Marxism–Leninism
- Political position: Far-left
- Colours: Red and yellow

Website
- partidoliberacion.org

The Liberation Party (Spanish: Partido de la Liberación, abbreviated PL) is a Marxist-Leninist party in Argentina. The party has its roots in the Argentine Socialist Vanguard Party (PSAV). It emerged as the Communist Vanguard (Vanguardia Comunista), evolving into the Marxist–Leninist Communist Party (Partido Comunista Marxista-Leninista) in 1976, before adopting the name PL in 1983. The party publishes Liberación.

After the death of Mao Zedong, the party approved of the changes of political line implemented by Deng Xiaoping.
