= Joan Rosell =

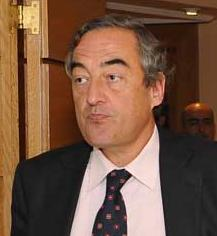
- Joan Rosell
- Born: 1957 (age 68–69); Barcelona, Spain
- Occupations: Civil engineer, journalist, businessman
- Known for: head of the Spanish Confederation of employers organisations

Joan Rosell Lastortras is the president of the Spanish employers confederation (CEOE). He replaced Gerardo Diaz Ferran in June 2011. Prior to being elected to this post he was the president of the Catalan national employers federation (Foment del Treball Nacional) for 16 years. During his career he was president of the following companies; Congost, Enher, Fuerzas Eléctricas de Cataluña and OMB, Sistemas de Higiene Urbana.

== Early life ==
After initially working as a journalist in Diario de Barcelona and Telexpres he studied civil engineering and graduated from the Universidad Politecnica de Cataluña. He also studied political science at the Universidad Complutense in Madrid. In 1980 he cofounded the political party Solidaritat Catalan and was candidate in the 1980 regional elections. In 1995 he became president of the Catalan employers federation. He is also memberof the FC Barcelona Foundation and a non-executive director of Criteria Caixa Corp. He has also written several books on employment and economic policy. He is married and has 3 children.

== President of the CEOE ==
He was elected on 20 September 2010 obtaining 444 votes versus 247 for his competitor. The highlight of his presidency was the negotiation of the spanish labour market reforms in 2012 with the government of Mariano Rajoy.

== Honours ==
- Commendatore al Merito, Italian Republic
- Silver medal of the Chambers of Commerce of Barcelona
- Gold key of the City of Barcelona
