= Confederación Española de Organizaciones Empresariales =

Spanish business organization

Confederación Española de Organizaciones Empresariales (Spanish Confederation of Employers' Organizations), or CEOE, is a Spanish institution founded in June 1977 that represents the Spanish business community. It includes state-owned and private companies in all sectors. It is a member of BusinessEurope.

== Chairs ==
- Carles Ferrer i Salat (1977–1984)
- José María Cuevas (1984–2007)
- Gerardo Díaz Ferrán (2007–2010)
- Joan Rosell (2010–2018)
- Antonio Garamendi (2018–)
