= Air Comet =

Spanish airline

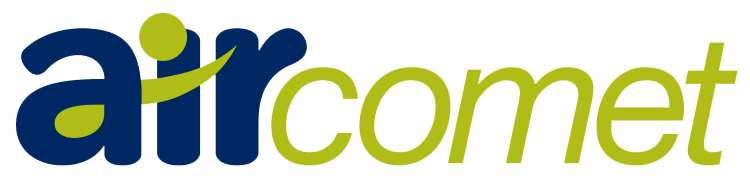
IATA	ICAO	Call sign
A7	MPD	RED COMET
- Founded: 23 December 1996 (as Air Plus Comet)
- Commenced operations: 1 March 1997
- Ceased operations: 21 December 2009
- Operating bases: Madrid–Barajas Airport
- Frequent-flyer program: Club Air Comet
- Subsidiaries: Air Comet Chile
- Fleet size: 9
- Destinations: 11
- Parent company: Grupo Marsans
- Headquarters: Madrid, Spain
- Key people: Gerardo Díaz Ferrán
- Website: aircomet.com

Air Comet was an airline based in Madrid, Spain. It operated scheduled long-haul services from Madrid to 13 destinations in Central and South America, as well as services in Europe. Its main base was Terminal 1 at Madrid–Barajas Airport. The airline cooperated with airlines such as AeroSur through codeshare agreements.

== History ==
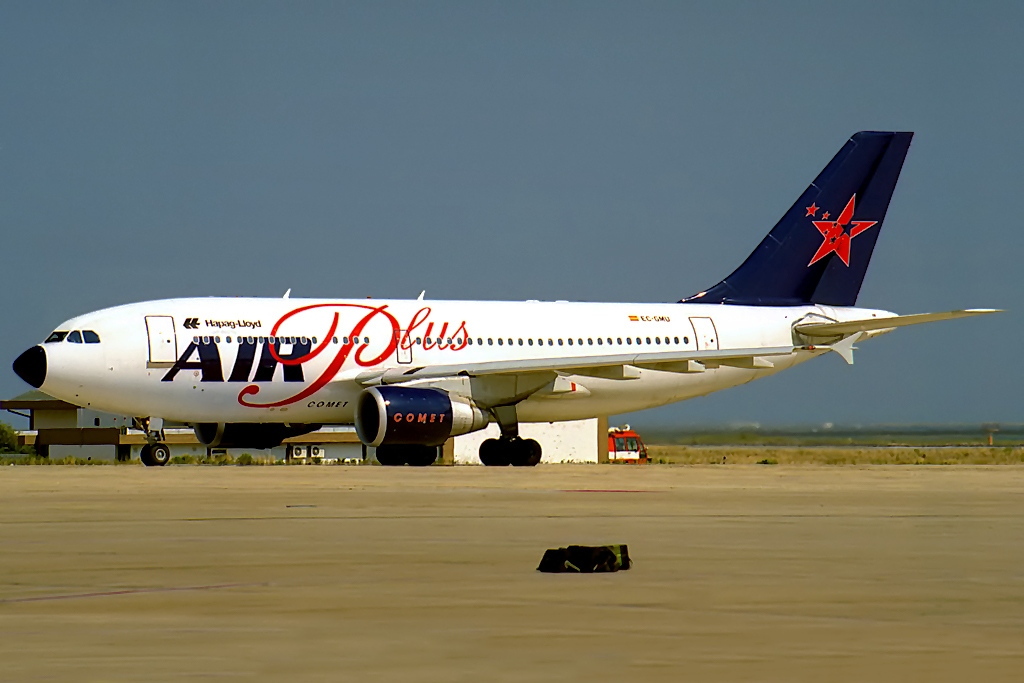
Air Plus Comet Airbus A310-300

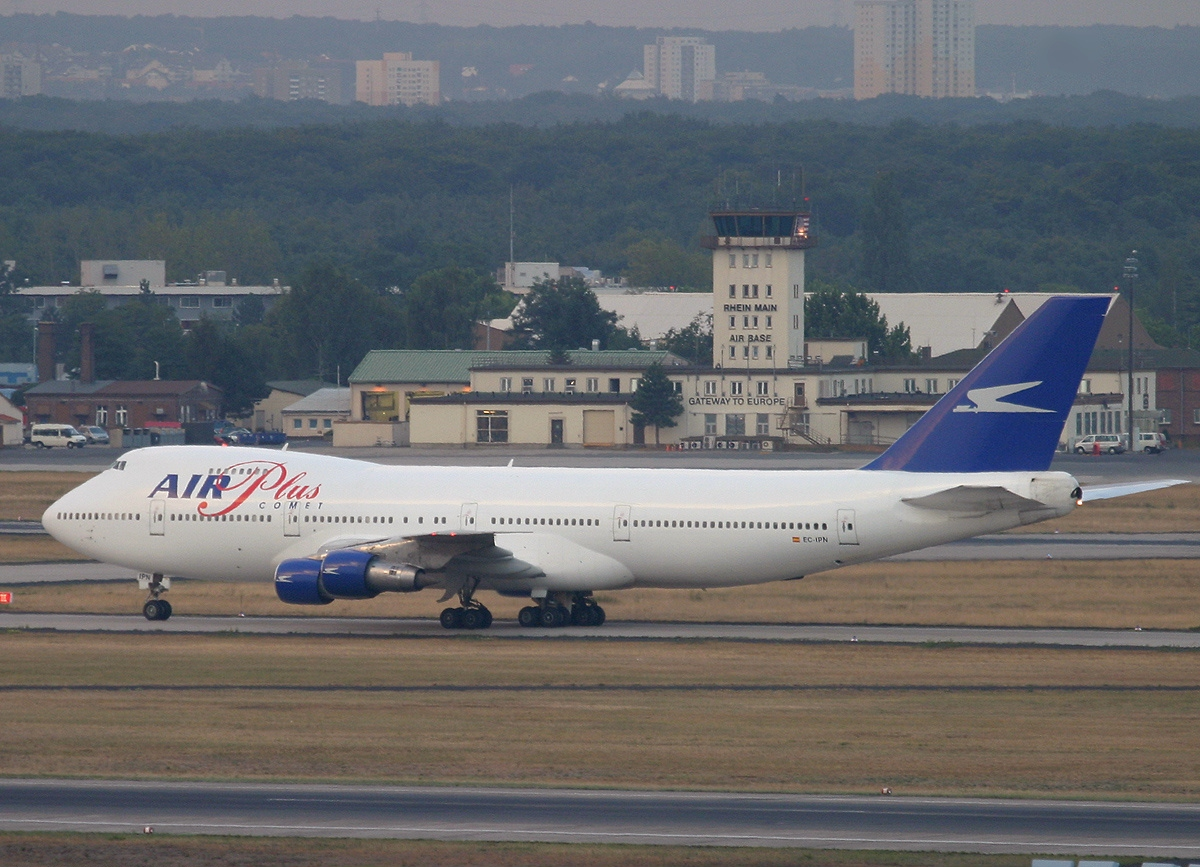
Air Plus Comet Boeing 747-200B

The airline was established on 23 December 1996 as Air Plus Comet and started operations on 1 March 1997, based at Madrid-Barajas Airport. On 11 December 1996 Oasis Airlines ceased operations, and their only aircraft, an Airbus A310, and many of their pilots and staff became the foundation of Air Plus Comet. In the post-takeover haste, the airline lacked a commercial name and its ICAO code was MPD, which stood for the last names of its three main executives (Mata, Pascual and Díaz).

It mainly operated long-haul charter services from Madrid and Palma de Mallorca to destinations in America and the Caribbean. It relaunched as a full-service carrier under the Air Comet name in January 2007. It was wholly owned by Grupo Marsans.

In January 2007, the airline took over some of now-defunct Air Madrid's Latin American routes and was renamed Air Comet and changed its livery.

On 11 February 2009, Air Comet was suspended from the IATA Clearing House due to non-payment of its January balance. On 21 December 2009, a High Court in London emitted a verdict favoring the German bank HSH Nordbank, which had sued Air Comet for not meeting the terms of payment for their leased aircraft. Therefore, the airline became legally unable to either operate their four A330-200s or sell any fare tickets. Air Comet's directors announced the airline was ceasing operations owing to bankruptcy. Air Comet's several women flight attendants posed for a nude calendar to cover lost wages. 1200 copies were printed, priced at €15 each.

== Destinations ==
Air Comet flew to the following destinations:

Europe

Spain

- Madrid - Madrid Barajas Airport base

Italy

- Fiumicino - Leonardo da Vinci–Fiumicino Airport

United Kingdom

- London - Gatwick Airport

The Caribbean

Cuba

- Havana - José Martí International Airport

South America

Argentina

- Buenos Aires - Ministro Pistarini International Airport

Bolivia

- Santa Cruz de la Sierra - Viru Viru International Airport

Colombia

- Bogotá - El Dorado International Airport
- Medellín - José María Córdova International Airport

Ecuador

- Guayaquil - José Joaquín de Olmedo International Airport
- Quito - Mariscal Sucre International Airport

Peru

- Lima - Jorge Chávez International Airport

== Fleet ==
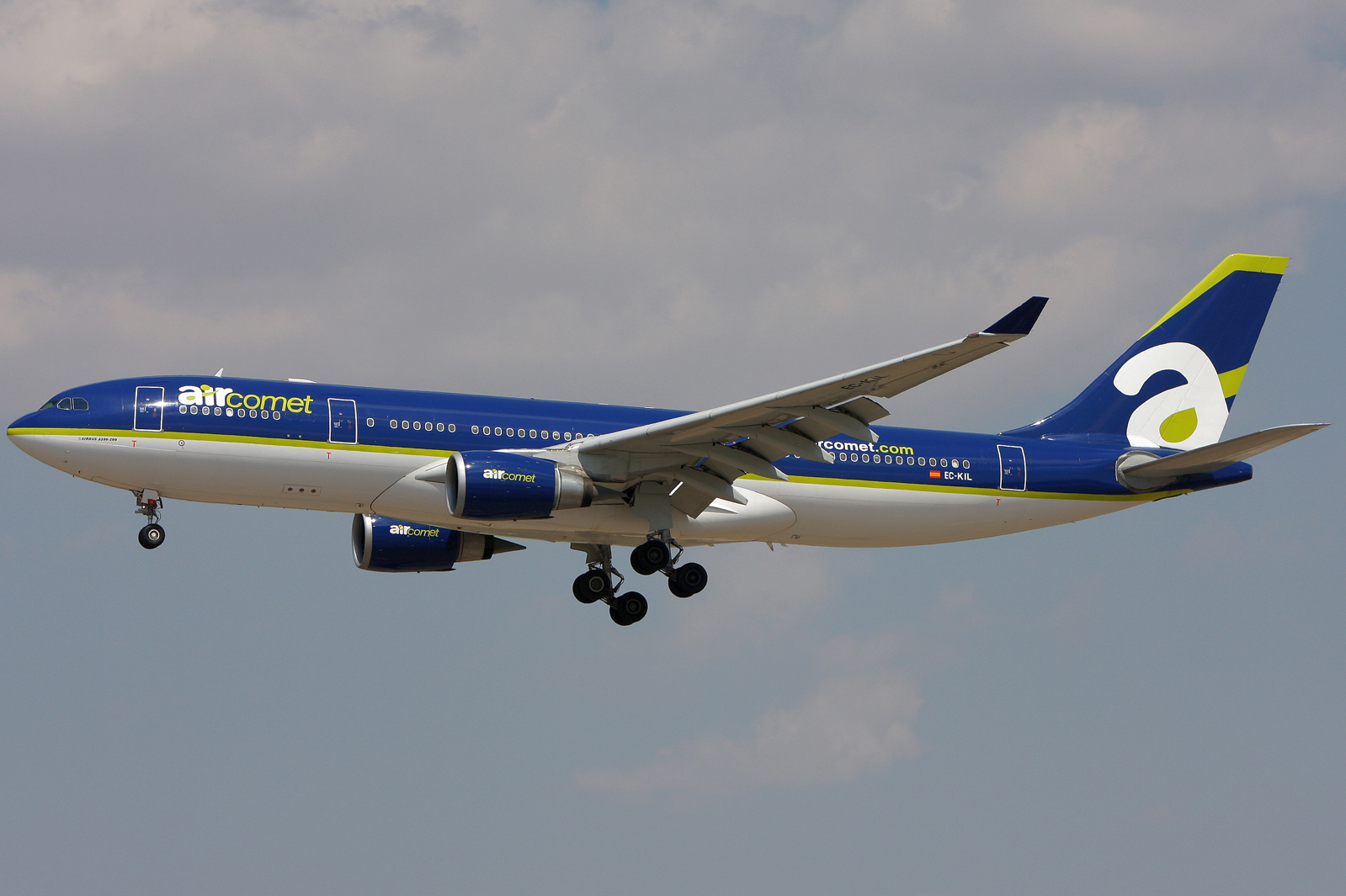
Air Comet Airbus A330-200

The Air Comet fleet consisted of the following aircraft:

Air Comet fleet
Aircraft	Total	Introduced	Retired	Notes
Airbus A310-300	10	1997	2009	1 leased from Austrian Airlines
Airbus A320-200	3	2007	2009	
Airbus A330-200	8	2006	2009	4 leased from Grupo Marsans; 1 leased from Eurofly; 1 leased from Iberworld
Airbus A340-300	3	2007	2009	
Boeing 737-300	2	2003	2006	
Boeing 747-200B	4	2003	2008	2 leased from Aerolíneas Argentinas
McDonnell Douglas MD-83	2	2006	2007	
McDonnell Douglas MD-88	2	2005	2007	Leased from Aerolíneas Argentinas

== See also ==
- List of defunct airlines of Spain
