= Aerolíneas Argentinas =

State-owned flag carrier of Argentina

Coordinates: 34.6033°S 58.3817°W

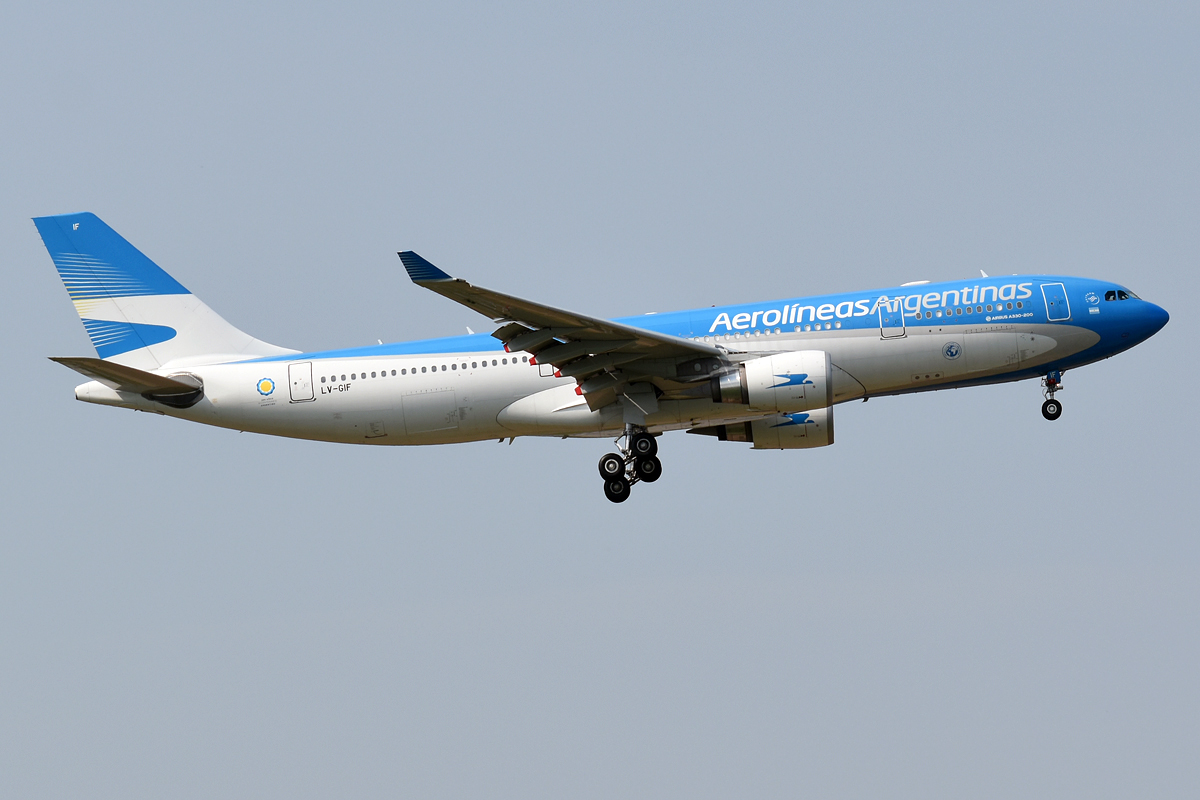
- Airbus A330-200
IATA	ICAO	Call sign
AR	ARG	ARGENTINA
- Founded: 14 May 1949; 77 years ago
- Commenced operations: 7 December 1950; 75 years ago
- AOC #: AISF117C
- Hubs: Buenos Aires–Aeroparque; Buenos Aires–Ezeiza
- Focus cities: Córdoba; Rosario
- Frequent-flyer program: Aerolíneas Plus
- Alliance: SkyTeam; SkyTeam Cargo
- Subsidiaries: Aerohandling; Aerolíneas Argentinas Cargo; JetPaq S.A.; Optar S.A.
- Fleet size: 83
- Parent company: Government of Argentina
- Headquarters: Aeroparque Jorge Newbery, Buenos Aires, Argentina
- Key people: Fabian Lombardo (president & CEO)
- Revenue: ▼US$ 1.33 billion (FY 2019)
- Net income: ▼US$ –603.15 million (FY 2019)
- Total assets: ▲US$ 1.6 billion (FY 2019)
- Total equity: ▼US$ –213.9 million(FY 2019)
- Employees: 10,230 (FY 2019)
- Website: www.aerolineas.com.ar/en-us

Aerolíneas Argentinas, formally Aerolíneas Argentinas S.A., is the state-owned flag carrier of Argentina and the country's largest airline. The airline was created in 1949, from the merger of Aeroposta Argentina (AA), Aviación del Litoral Fluvial Argentino (ALFA), Flota Aérea Mercante Argentina (FAMA), and Zonas Oeste y Norte de Aerolíneas Argentinas (ZONDA), and started operations in December 1950. A consortium led by Iberia took control of the airline in 1990, and Grupo Marsans acquired the company and its subsidiaries in 2001, following a period of severe financial difficulties that put the airline on the brink of closure. The airline was renationalised in late 2008. It has its headquarters in Buenos Aires. The airline joined the SkyTeam alliance in August 2012; the airline's cargo division became a member of SkyTeam Cargo in November 2013.

Aerolíneas Argentinas operates from two hubs, both located in Buenos Aires: Aeroparque Jorge Newbery and Ministro Pistarini International Airport. Its narrow-body fleet, used on domestic and regional routes, consists of the Brazilian-made Embraer 190, as well as the Boeing 737-700, -800 and MAX 8, whereas intercontinental and transoceanic services are flown on the wide-body Airbus A330-200.

== History ==
=== Early years to privatisation ===
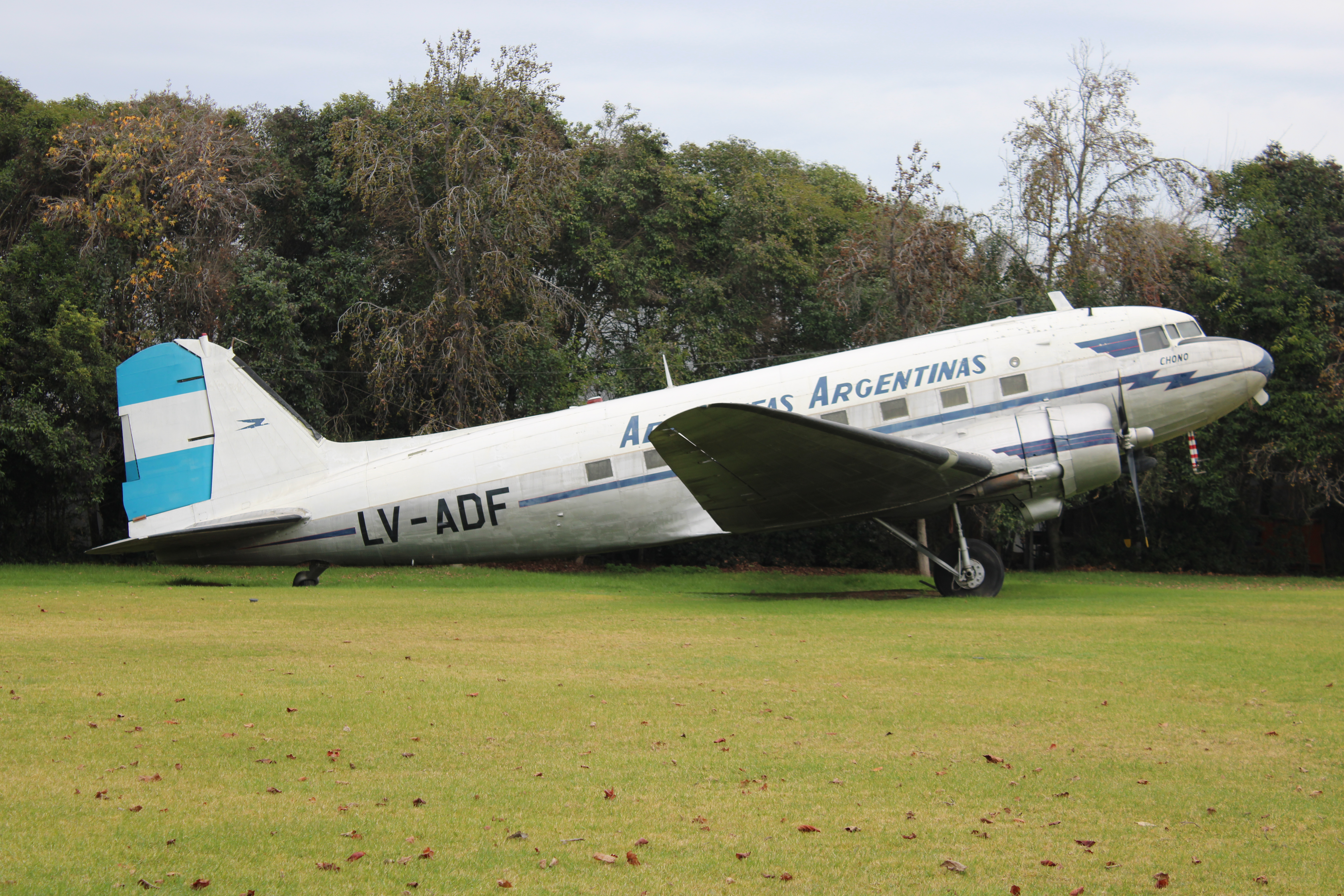
A Douglas DC-3 restored in Aerolineas Argentinas livery

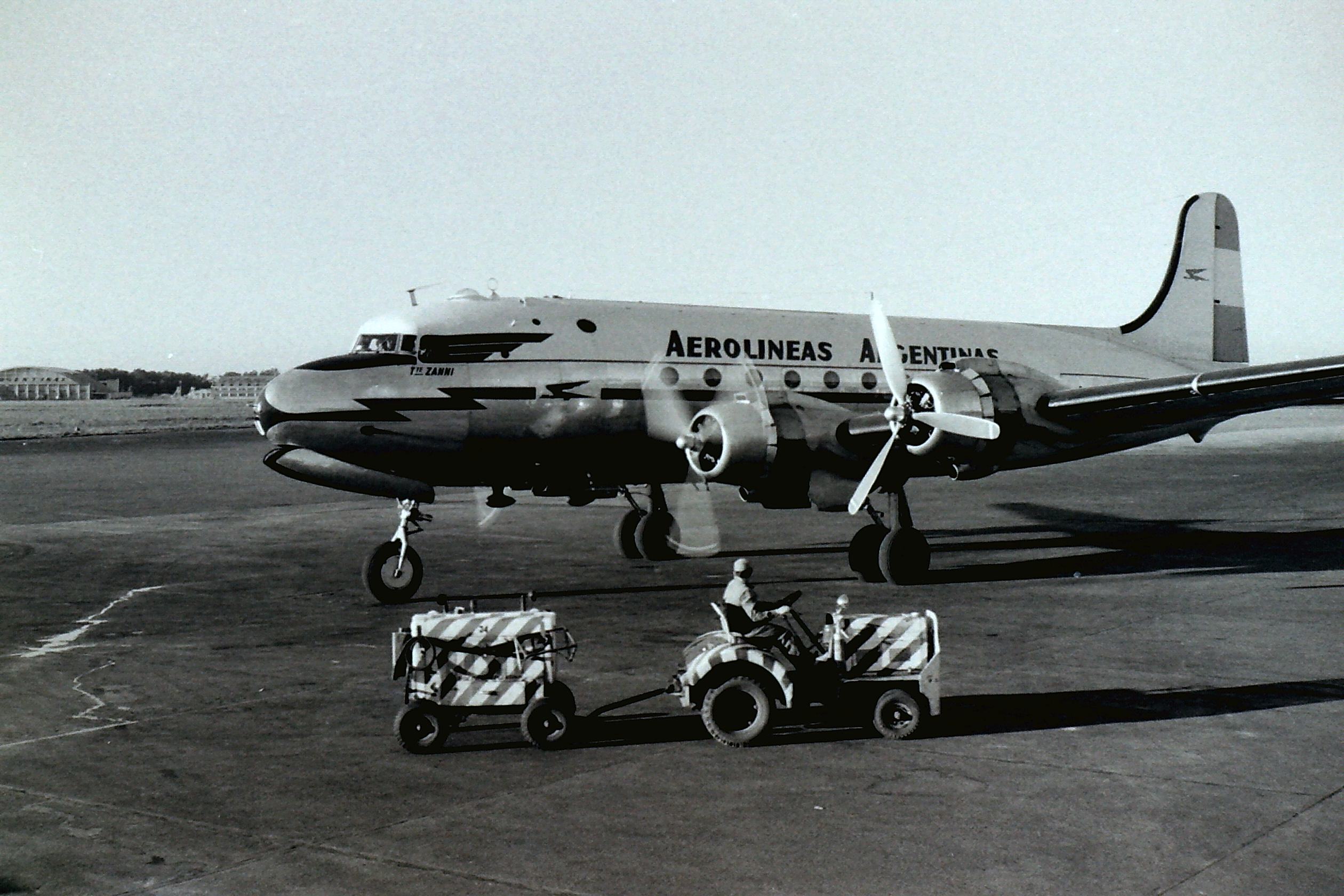
DC-4 at Buenos Aires-Ministro Pistarini airport, ca. 1958

The history of the airline began in 1929, when Compagnie Générale Aéropostale (Aéropostale) started airmail operations between Buenos Aires and Asunción using Laté-25 equipment, later expanding its network to cities located in Patagonia. Many French pilots (including aviator and author Antoine de Saint-Exupéry) flew for the company in its beginnings. Argentine personnel replaced the Frenchmen as they gradually withdrew from the airline, and shortly after Aéropostale's Argentine subsidiary Aeroposta Argentina was formed. In 1947, this airline became a mixed-stock company in which the government had a 20% stake and private investors held the balance. As Aeroposta expanded its network southwards and incorporated the Douglas DC-3 into its fleet, another three mixed-stock companies were in operation at the time: ALFA mainly operated flying boats northwards to the Mesopotamia, FAMA operated overseas services with DC-4s as its mainstay equipment, and ZONDA was mainly concerned with operations in the northwest region. These carriers became unprofitable and President Juan Perón had them amalgamated into a single state-owned company on 14 May 1949. The state holding was officially rebranded as Aerolíneas Argentinas-Empresa del Estado. The four companies comprising the state holding ceased independent operations on 31 December 1949.

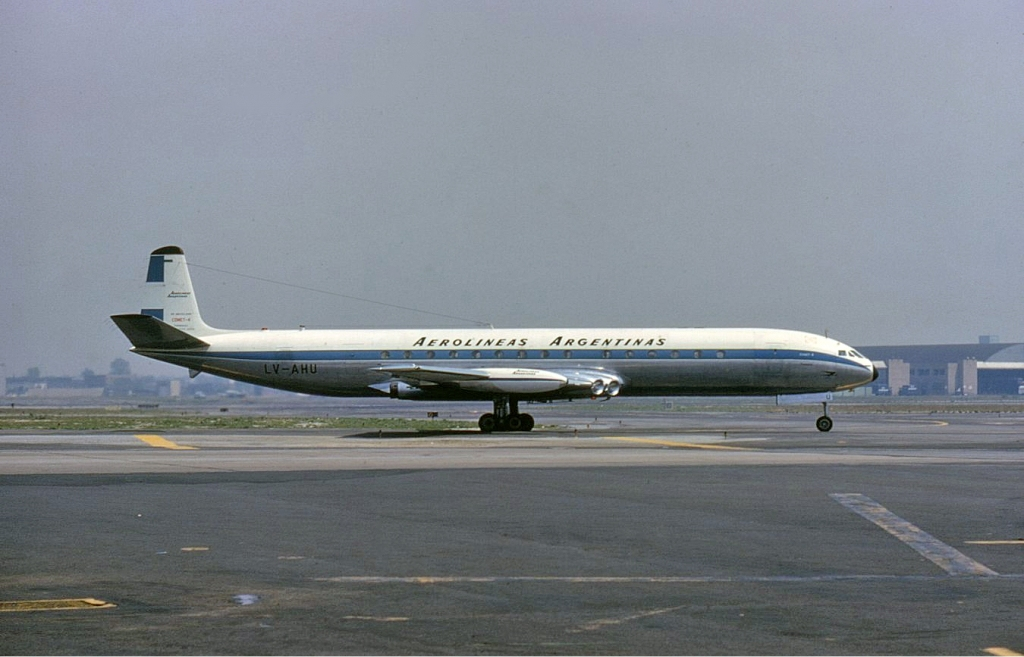
de Havilland DH.106 Comet 4 at New York-Idlewild Airport in 1965

Aerolíneas Argentinas started operations on its own on 7 December 1950. In February 1950, almost 10 months prior to the start of operations, five new Convairs were already acquired. As early as 1950, the Douglas DC-6 was added to the fleet and was used to launch a weekly Buenos Aires–Rio de Janeiro–Natal–Dakar–Lisbon–Paris–Frankfurt flight in late 1950. Soon afterwards, Douglas DC-4s joined the fleet and services were inaugurated to Santiago, Lima, Santa Cruz de la Sierra, and São Paulo. By March 1953, the airline's network was 35,000 miles (56,000 km) long, flown with DC-3s, DC-4s, DC-6s, Convair-Liner 240s, and Short Sandringhams. The company carried 291,988 passengers in 1954, (Note: The figures for this particular year are discrepant as Flight also informed the total number of carried passengers for 1954 to be 280,683.) and 327,808 in 1955. On 8 February 1957, it was reported that Aerolíneas Argentinas had ordered ten F-27 Friendships. (Note: Despite Flight confirming the order a week later, the carrier never operated the type.) The Comet had begun commercial jet services in the 1950s, and the carrier once again set the pace among the South American airlines, when Aerolíneas' president A. Cdre. Juan José Güiraldes persuaded Argentina's President Arturo Frondizi to buy six of them, becoming the first overseas airline in ordering the type. The first of these aircraft departed Hatfield Aerodrome on 2 March 1959; over 18 hours were needed for it to cover a distance of 7,075 miles (11,386 km) between Hatfield and Buenos Aires. On 7 March, she was christened Las Tres Marías by Frondizi's wife Elena Faggionato at Ezeiza Airport. Comet flights to New York City began in May 1959.

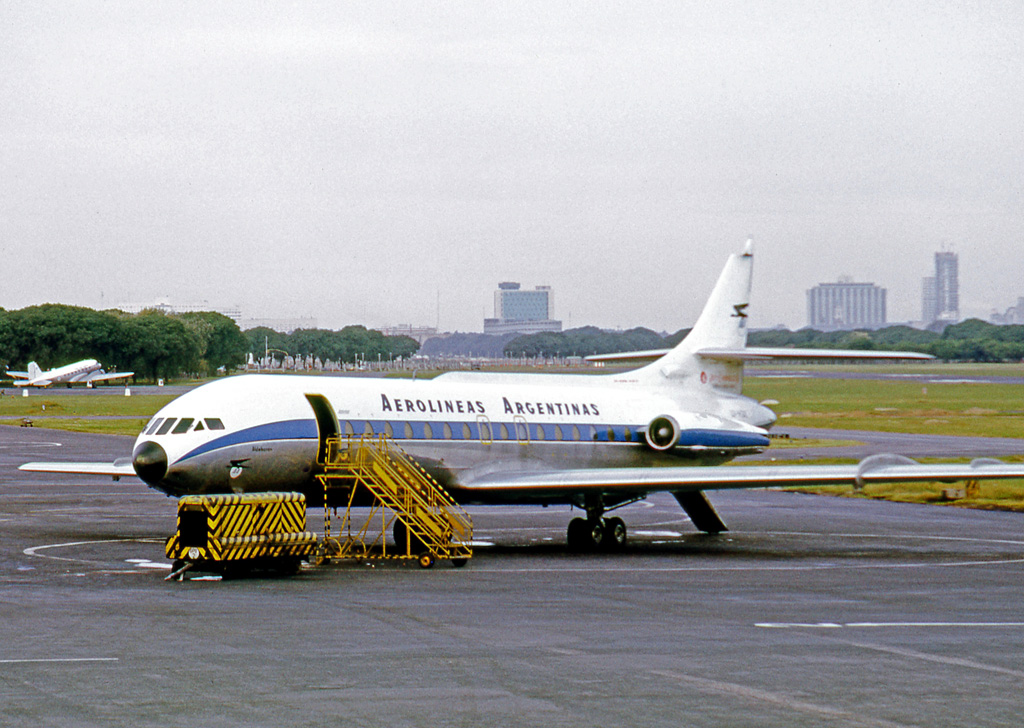
SE.210 Caravelle at Buenos Aires-Aeroparque Jorge Newbery airport in 1972

In the early 1960s, the fleet consisted of four Comet 4s, four Convair 240s, 15 DC-3s, six DC-4s, five DC-6s and six Sandringhams, whereas the ten F-27s ordered in 1957 were still pending delivery. The 1960s saw the carrier ordering the Avro 748 turboprop airliner. The aircraft started services on 15 February 1962 between Buenos Aires and Punta del Este. The first flight for the Caravelle in Aerolíneas colours was Buenos Aires–Santiago on 1 April 1962. In April 1965, the carrier had 5,960 employees, and the fleet consisted of three Comet 4s, one Comet 4C, three Caravelles, 12 DC-3s (three of them freighters), six DC-4s, three DC-6s and 12 HS-748s. In 1966, loans granted by the Ex-Im Bank and Boeing permitted the purchase of a number of Boeing 707-320Bs in a deal worth US$37,000,000 (equivalent to $367,153,846 in 2025). In November 1969, the carrier entered a pool agreement with Lufthansa covering services between Germany and Argentina.

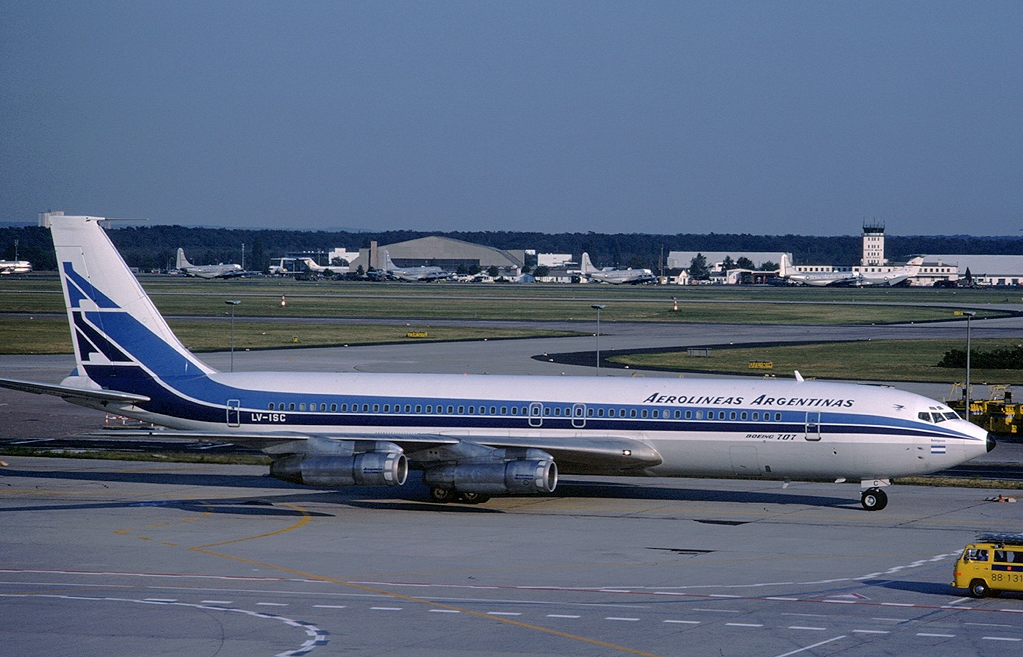
A Boeing 707-320B at Frankfurt Airport in 1976

By March 1970, Aerolíneas Argentinas had a fleet of six Boeing 707s that served routes to Europe and the United States, three Caravelles 6Rs and four Comet 4s that flew regional services, and 12 HS-748s that flew domestically, whereas six Boeing 737-200s were on order. During the decade, the fleet had the arrival of three different aircraft types from Boeing: the 727—the first example entered the fleet in December 1977 on lease from Hughes AirWest and three more were ordered directly from Boeing — the 737, and the 747. In the mid-1970s, the introduction of Fokker F-28 prompted the retirement of the last HS-748s, making the company the first South American airline with an all-jet fleet. Frankfurt, Madrid, and Rome became the first destinations to be served with the new 747s, starting January 1977. Another milestone for the company took place in June 1980, with the first south polar scheduled service, linking Buenos Aires with Hong Kong via Auckland. Late that year, a second-hand Boeing 747SP was acquired from Braniff for US$51,000,000 (equivalent to $199,283,118 in 2025).

The airline was assigned by law the monopoly of international operations from Argentina in 1971. This meant no other Argentine airline was able to operate international flights, let alone the already created Austral. The carrier therefore became the flag carrier of the country. The same law also assigned Aerolíneas Argentinas a 50% share of the domestic market.

Following the acquisition of Austral by the Argentine government in 1980, both Aerolíneas Argentinas and Austral became government-owned, to the extent that some routes were simultaneously operated, even using similar equipment. However, a state of continuous tension existed over salary differences between both companies that eventually led the Aerolíneas Argentinas' pilots to a three-week-long strike that started on 1 July 1986. During this strike, the government leased pilots from the Argentine Air Force to operate some aircraft. Other companies took advantage of this situation and gained the market share that Aerolíneas Argentinas lost, as domestic routes were operated by Austral, LADE, and LAPA, and the government temporarily authorised foreign carriers to exploit the company's international routes.

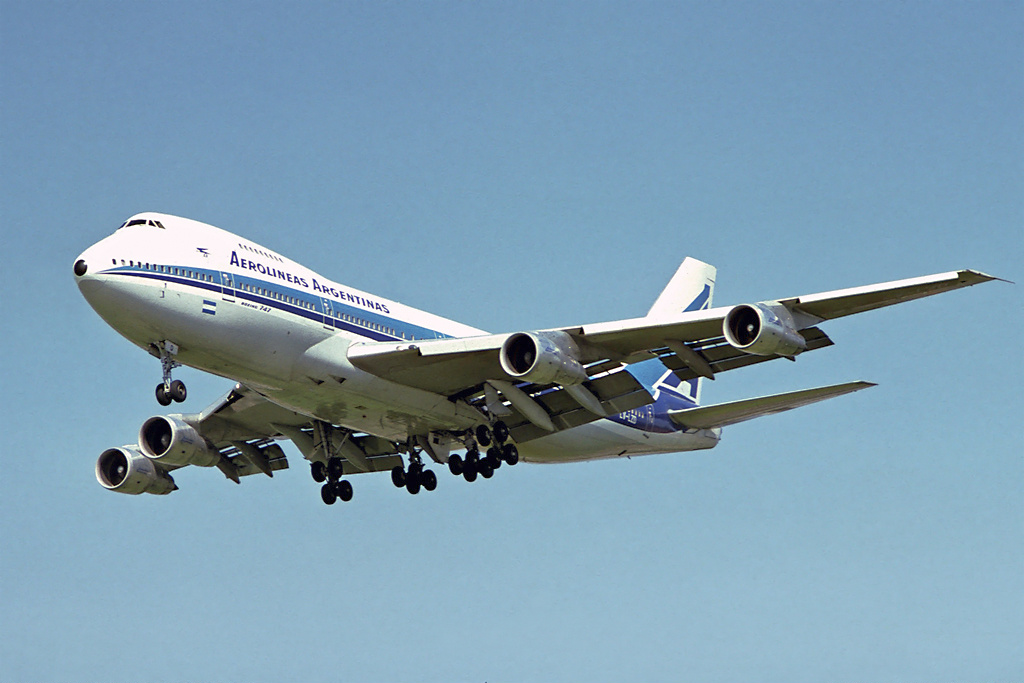
Boeing 747-200B, 1979

Using a Boeing 747-200, the airline operated the first transantarctic commercial flight on 7 June 1980. During and shortly after the Falklands War in 1982, the airline was banned from British airspace. A flight from London-Gatwick to Argentina's capital was once scheduled, but because of the ban, passengers bound to Argentina had to change planes at Madrid-Barajas.

In March 1985, Aerolíneas Argentinas had 9,822 employees. At this time, the fleet comprised one Boeing 707-320B, one Boeing 707-320C, seven Boeing 727-200s, 10 Boeing 737-200s, two Boeing 737-200Cs, five Boeing 747-200Bs, one Boeing 747SP, two Fokker F28-1000s, and a Fokker F28-4000. The international network radiated from Buenos Aires and served Asunción, Auckland, Bogotá, Cape Town, Caracas, Frankfurt, Guayaquil, Hong Kong, La Paz, Lima, Los Angeles, Madrid, Mexico City, Miami, Montevideo, Montreal, New York, Paris, Rio de Janeiro, Rome, São Paulo, Santiago, Porto Alegre, and Zurich. Sydney was first served in 1989, and flights to London resumed in January 1990.

=== Privatisation: 1990–2008 ===
Position of the company upon the acquisition by Iberia and when it was sold in 2001
Item	1991	2001
Assets (without routes, brand, etc., US$ mil.)	636-776	?
Annual balance (US$ mil.)	18	–390
Debt (US$ mil.)	0	900
Aircraft (owned/leased)	28/1	1/43
Flight simulators	3	2
Number of employees	10,372	6,734

The privatisation of the airline started being considered under the government of Raúl Alfonsín, when SAS was proposed to become a 40% shareholder of the state company. This was firmly resisted by the Peronist opposition. The staff had grown to 10,372 by March 1990. Late this year, (Note: There is a discrepancy regarding the precise date of the award, as it was informed to be in July 1990 and in November the same year.) a consortium led by Iberia and Austral's owner Cielos del Sur S.A. acquired an 85% stake in Aerolíneas Argentinas for US$130,000,000 (equivalent to $320,364,238 in 2025) in cash, the same amount to be injected within a 10-month period, and a debt-equity exchange worth US$2.01 billion. Another consortium led by Alitalia, American Airlines, KLM and Varig had earlier pulled out from the process. Paradoxically, one of the first actions taken by the new Peronist government was to privatise the carrier, after airily opposing to the privatisation propositions of its predecessor. The sale of the airline followed the divestiture of the government shareholding in the national telephone company, which also took place in 1990 during the Carlos Menem presidency's privatisation wave, intended to divest the participation of the state in a number of enterprises to reduce the US$40 billion debt to foreign banks by US$7 billion. Aimed at favouring the privatisation process, the government absorbed a US$741 million debt the company took between 1981 and 1982 for capitalisation purposes. Despite the carrier being regarded as overstaffed and bureaucratic, it was debt-free at that time, having an average profitability of US$90 million a year; it actually had US$719 million in revenues for the year prior to the privatisation. The privatisation contract, which specified the buyer should pay US$260 million in cash and US$1,610 million in external debt bonds, was ratified by the Supreme Court. Furthermore, a clause enabled the buyer to indebt Aerolíneas Argentinas for the buyout process; this was reflected in the airline's 1991 balance, which included debts worth US$390 million for its own acquisition. This privatisation process was not ruled as illegal until 2009.

Revenue passenger-kilometres, scheduled flights only
Year	Millions
1950	253
1955	353
1960	592
1965	948
1969	1,615
1971	2,069
1975	3,441
1980	6,927
1989	8,254
2000	11,111
2008	12,107
2009	11,477
2010	13,640
2011	13,649
2012	14,150
2013	17,753 (projected)
2016	18,933
2017	20,390
source	* ICAO Digest of Statistics for 1950–55 * IATA World Air Transport Statistics, 1960–2000

Austral's owner Cielos del Sur S.A. was sold to Iberia in March 1991, further increasing the Spanish flag carrier's stake in the Argentine air market. Aerolíneas Argentinas and Austral never merged throughout the private era, and remained as separate companies with the same shareholder. Iberia subsequently boosted its stake in the airline to 85% in April 1994 after a US$500,000,000 (equivalent to $1,086,102,380 in 2025) cash injection. Out of the remaining 15%, the Argentine government held the 5% stake it was initially assigned, while 10% belonged to the employees. Furthermore, at this stage the Argentine government resigned to the voting privilege it had in the directory of the airline. Iberia was subsequently obliged by the European Commission to cut its stake in Aerolíneas Argentinas as a condition for receiving state aid. It thence reduced its participation to 20%, transferring the remaining 65% to Interinvest/Andes holding, a consortium comprising the Spanish government holding company (SEPI) – the actual owner of Iberia before it was privatised in 2001 – and banks Merrill Lynch and Bankers Trust, among others. In July 1997, Iberia cut again its stake in Aerolíneas Argentinas from 20% to 10%, while American Airlines's parent company AMR acquired a 10% stake of Aerolineas Argentinas/Austral's major stockholder Interinvest, equivalent to a participation of 8.5% in both Argentine companies, with the commitment of finding investors for Aerolíneas Argentinas. AMR's 8.5% operation was finally cleared by the United States Department of Justice in early July 1998. By that time, the Argentine government still owned a 5% stake in Aerolíneas Argentinas. Losses had mounted to US$927 million since 1992, totalling US$150 million only for 1999. The restructuring plan presented by AMR, mainly aimed at reverting these losses, was rejected by the SEPI. Furthermore, given that the AMR Corporation did not find purchasers for the company, the SEPI put the control of the airline back into Spanish hands. The vacancy left in the management positions that followed the departure of the AMR holding from Aerolíneas was soon filled in by the SEPI. To protect the interests of the Argentine national carrier, the government suspended an open skies agreement between Argentina and the United States that would come into force in September 2000.

The airline had 5,384 employees at March 2000. At this time, the aircraft park consisted of two Airbus A310-300s, four Airbus A340-200s, four Boeing 737-200s, Boeing 737-200 Advanced, one Boeing 737-200C, and nine Boeing 747-200Bs, whereas six Airbus A340-600s were on order. (Note: The airline never operated the type.) The list of international destinations served at the time was Asunción, Auckland, Bogotá, Cancún, Caracas, Florianópolis, Lima, Madrid, Mexico City, Miami, Montevideo, New York, Orlando, Paris, Punta del Este, Rio de Janeiro, Rome, Santiago, São Paulo, and Sydney; domestic services to Catamarca, Comodoro Rivadavia, Córdoba, Corrientes, Esquel, Iguazú, Jujuy, La Rioja, Mar del Plata, Mendoza, Neuquén, Posadas, Presidencia Roque Sáenz Peña, Resistencia, Rio Gallegos, Río Grande, Rosario, Salta, San Carlos de Bariloche, Santa Cruz, Santa Fe, Santiago del Estero, Trelew, Tucuman, Ushuaia, and Villa Gesell were also operated.

Allegations of corruption were made on the basis of the price paid by Iberia and the Spanish firm's ulterior conduct (including some convoluted lease-back operations), with the airline paying the price for its own purchase with its assets. Subsequent management by American Airlines and SEPI drove Aerolíneas Argentinas into an almost terminal crisis in 2001. In June 2001, the aftermath began after the airline filed for bankruptcy protection from creditors, and went into administration; the salaries were paid by the Argentine government, instead of using money coming from the SEPI. The payment of salaries for the upcoming months was suspended, as the mechanics union refused to accept the reorganisation plan raised by the SEPI to keep the company afloat. On 6 June, flights to Auckland, Los Angeles, Miami, New York, São Paulo, Sydney and Rio de Janeiro were halted. Owing to a US$15 million debt with the fuel supplier, the suspension of the daily flight to Madrid, which also served Rome and was the last connection with Europe, followed a week later. After this, most of the fleet was grounded, and only 30% and 10% of domestic and international flights, respectively, were operating.

The Marsans Group acquired a 92% stake through its subsidiary Air Comet from the SEPI in late 2001, and committed to inject US$50 million capital with the intention of resuming short– as well as long–haul services. The resumption of international flights started in early November 2001. In July 2002, the airline and its subsidiaries employed 7,090. The company exited bankruptcy in January 2003, and emerged from administration a month later. That year, the first profit in five years was announced, along with an important increase in market share.

=== Renationalisation: 2008–onwards ===
Aerolíneas and Austral net income
Years	Losses (in non-inflation adjusted pesos)	Losses (in US dollars as official rate)	Source
2008	1,814,518,196	525,490,355	
2009	1,661,074,557	437,124,883	
2010	1,611,603,589	405,332,895	
2012	2,407,120,549	489,451,108	
2013	2,781,683,300	426,573,118	
2014	5,486,921,815	641,670,192	
2015	9,278,058,094	711,507,523	
2016	7,035,221,506	442,745,217	
2017	6,379,021,189	342,057,011	
2018	21,804,470,692	578,367,923	
2019	41,182,297,596	687,632,286	

In May 2008, an initial agreement between the Argentine government and Grupo Marsans in which the latter would decrease its participation in the airline to 35% was announced; in reducing their holding, Marsans would make room for new private investors, as well as for the government of Argentina to increase its stake in the airline from 5 to 20%. Amid accusations from Marsans and following the disclosure of an agreement, the Argentine government took the airline back under state control in July 2008, after acquiring 99.4% of the stake for an undisclosed price; the remaining 0.6% continued being owned by the company's employees.

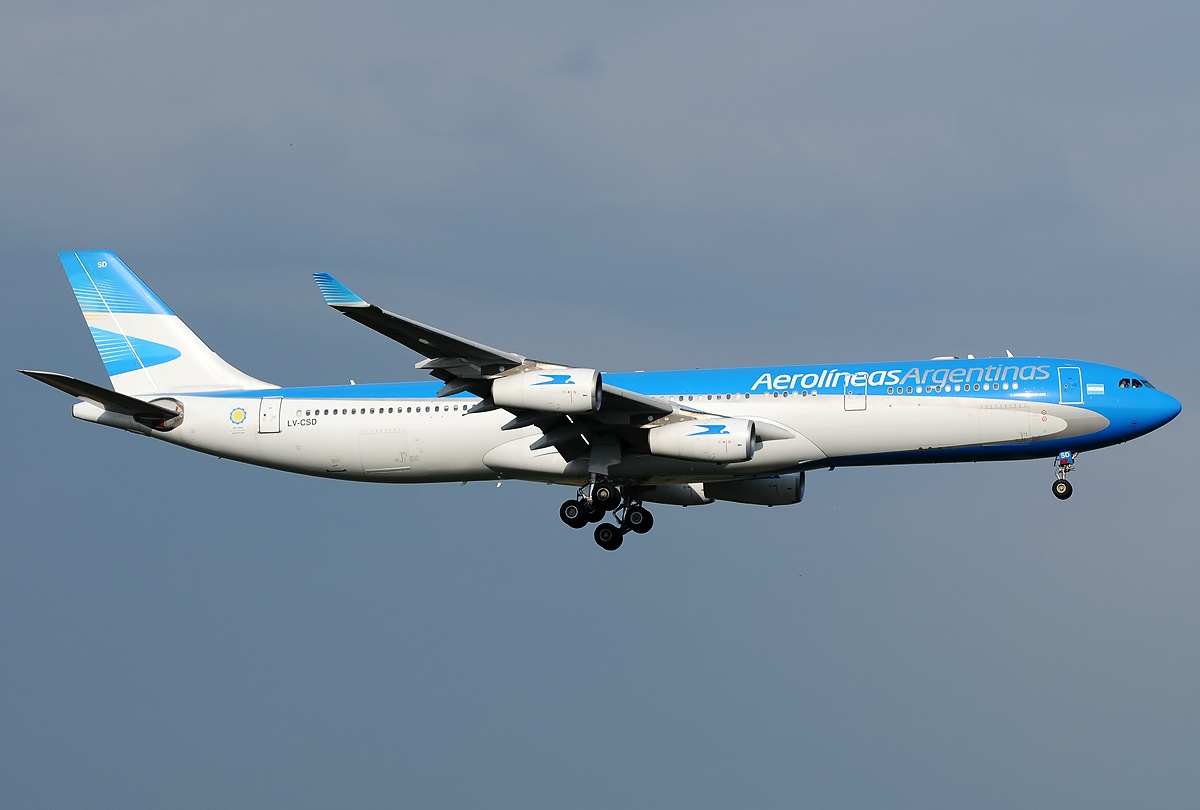
Airbus A340-300, 2012

At this time, the company had 40% of its fleet grounded. The act renationalising Aerolíneas Argentinas and its subsidiary Austral Líneas Aéreas was passed by the Chamber of Deputies in August 2008, and became law in September 2008 following the 46–21 vote in the Argentine Senate. There were disagreements regarding the value to be paid by Grupo Marsans to the government. Negotiations fell through, and an administrator was appointed by an Argentine court in November that year to oversee the running of the company. A vote by both the lower and the upper houses of the Argentine Congress in support of taking over the company and its subsidiaries took place in December, when the Chamber of Deputies voted 152–84 in favour of the expropriation, and the Senate approved the bill by a 42–20 vote.

In September 2011, the airline emerged from the reorganisation proceedings it had filed in 2001. In late November 2011, the government announced an austerity plan for the company to reduce the deficit it has been incurring since being taken over from Marsans; the plan included the revision of unprofitable routes, the reduction of pilot/aircraft pay rates, and the abandonment of obsolete equipment, among others.

Passenger traffic for the group reached a record 8.5 million in 2013, a 57% increase from the time of its renationalization in 2008. Revenues rose to a record of US$2 billion in 2013, an 85% increase from 2008 levels; losses likewise declined from $860 million (78% of revenues) to $250 million (12% of revenues). Corporate assets as of 2012 had tripled to over $1.6 billion, as the group's fleet grew from 26 to 63 planes and the average age of same was reduced from 20 years to 7.5. In 2017, projections for 2018 were given at 14.5 million passengers and a loss of $90 million.

Between 2008 and 2021, Aerolíneas Argentinas received over $8 billion USD in subsidy from the Argentine government.

=== Proposed privatisation under Javier Milei ===
Following the election of Javier Milei as president of Argentina in 2023, he affirmed his intention to privatise the airline again. Under his proposal, shares in the airline would be handed over by the state to its workers along with an end in state support for the airline. Unions have expressed opposition to the proposal with one union head promising violence before apologising. Workers have also gone on strike over the issue. On 21 December 2023, Milei announced a presidential decree to begin the process of privatization and transfer of shares, likely to employees. He would also implement open skies policies including cabotage to improve competitiveness.

== Corporate affairs ==
=== Ownership and subsidiaries ===
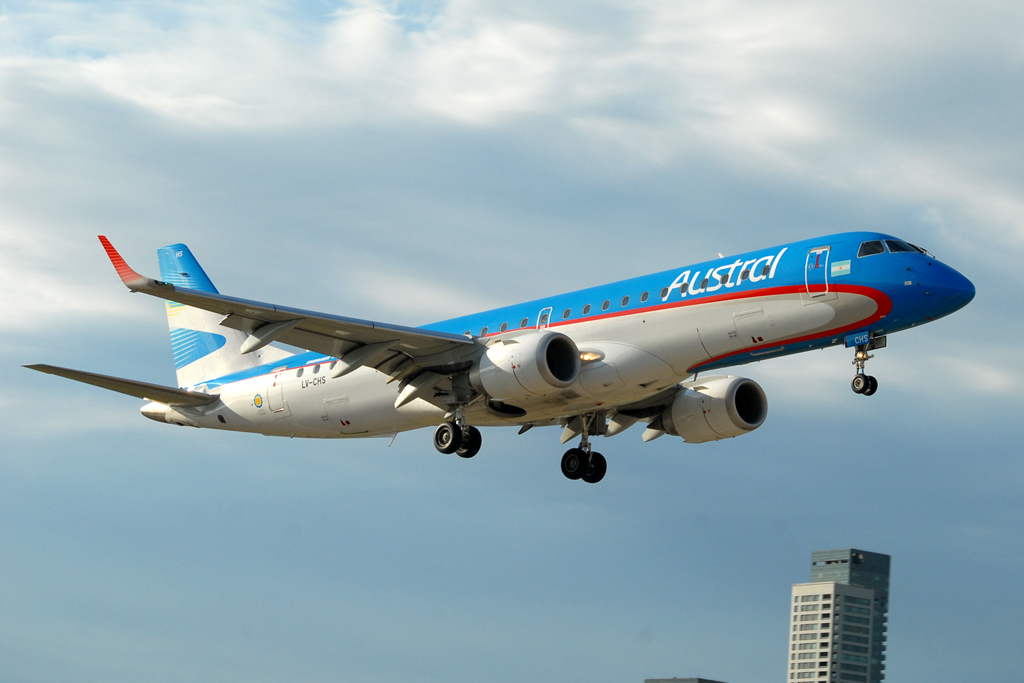
For some time Austral Líneas Aéreas was a subsidiary of Aerolíneas Argentinas.

Aerolíneas Argentinas was completely owned by the government of Argentina, as of December 2014. As of December 2013, Aerolíneas Argentinas Cargo, domestic airline Austral Líneas Aéreas, ramp service provider Aerohandling, cargo division JetPaq S.A., and tourism operator Optar S.A. are listed as Aerolíneas Argentinas subsidiaries. The airline and its subsidiaries operate from two hubs, both located in Buenos Aires. Operations of domestic and regional flights by the smaller aircraft types in the fleet are concentrated at Aeroparque Jorge Newbery, which also serves as its operating base, whereas Ministro Pistarini International Airport is mainly used for international services, although some regional and a few domestic services are operated as well. In 2010, the company began providing free-of-charge transfers to passengers connecting between the two airports. The service was discontinued in 2020.

As of December 2019, the airline and its subsidiaries employed 10,230.

In 2020, due to the COVID-19 pandemic, Aerolíneas Argentinas and its Austral subsidiary merged. Austral's fleet was integrated into Aerolíneas' fleet, agreements were reached with both airlines' pilot and cabin crew unions, and the Aerolíneas Argentinas brand was retained.

=== Key people ===
Pablo Ceriani was president of the airline until 2023. Fabian Lombardo, previously chief commercial officer, became president in 2024.

=== Headquarters ===
Aerolíneas Argentinas is headquartered at Aeroparque Jorge Newbery, located in Buenos Aires.

== Destinations ==
=== Alliances ===
With the mentoring of Delta Air Lines, the company signed an agreement to begin the process of joining SkyTeam in late November 2010. It became the first South American and the second Latin American carrier in joining the alliance in August 2012, as well as its 18th overall member. The airline's cargo division, Aerolíneas Argentinas Cargo, joined SkyTeam Cargo in November 2013, becoming the 12th member airline of the alliance.

=== Codeshare agreements ===
Aerolíneas Argentinas has codeshare agreements with these airlines:

- Aeroméxico
- Air Europa
- Air France
- Avianca
- Boliviana de Aviación
- China Eastern Airlines
- Delta Air Lines
- El Al
- Gol Linhas Aéreas Inteligentes
- ITA Airways
- KLM
- Korean Air
- LATAM Airlines
- Saudia

=== Interline agreements ===
- Emirates
- Iberia
- Sky Airline
- Scandinavian Airlines
- Swiss International Air Lines

== Fleet ==
=== Current ===
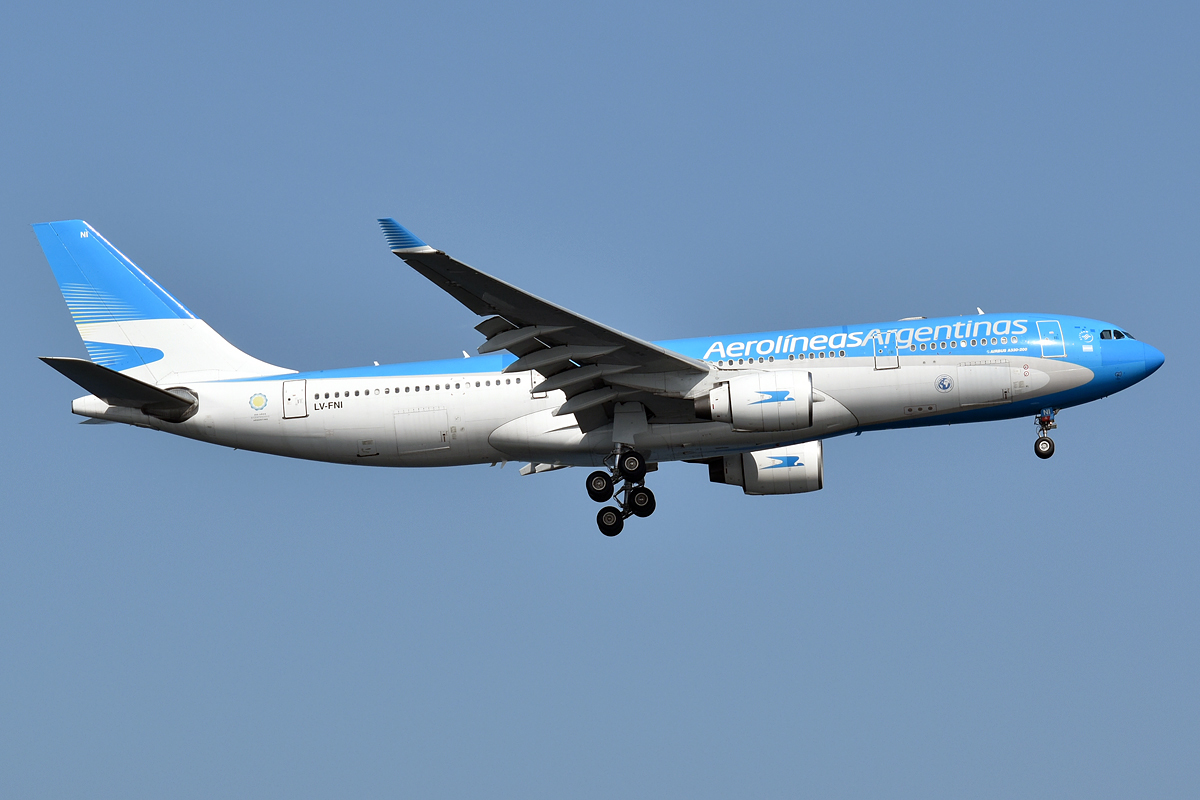
Aerolíneas Argentinas Airbus A330-200

As of December 2025, Aerolíneas Argentinas operates the following aircraft:

Aerolíneas Argentinas fleet (Note: Information concerning seat configuration is accurate for most of the fleet; nevertheless, on some equipment this information differs from the one shown in the table.)
Aircraft	In service	Orders	Passengers			Notes
Aircraft	In service	Orders	J	Y	Total	Notes
Airbus A330-200	10	—	24	248	272	
Airbus A330-900	—	6	TBA			Deliveries begin in 2028
Boeing 737-700	4	—	8	120	128	
Boeing 737-800	28	—	8	162	170	
Boeing 737 MAX 8	15	6	8	162	170	
Boeing 737 MAX 10	—	8	TBA			
Embraer 190	24	—	8	88	96	
Cargo fleet
Boeing 737-800BCF	2	—	Cargo			
Total	83	20				

=== Retired ===
Aerolíneas Argentinas historical fleet

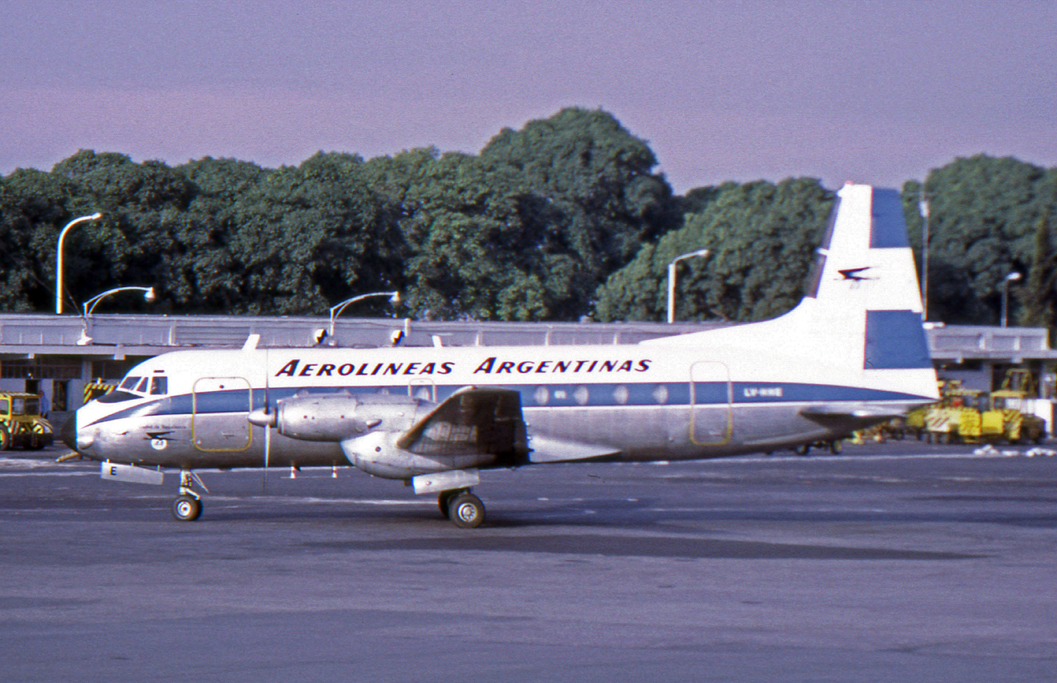
An HS 748 at Aeroparque Jorge Newbery in 1972

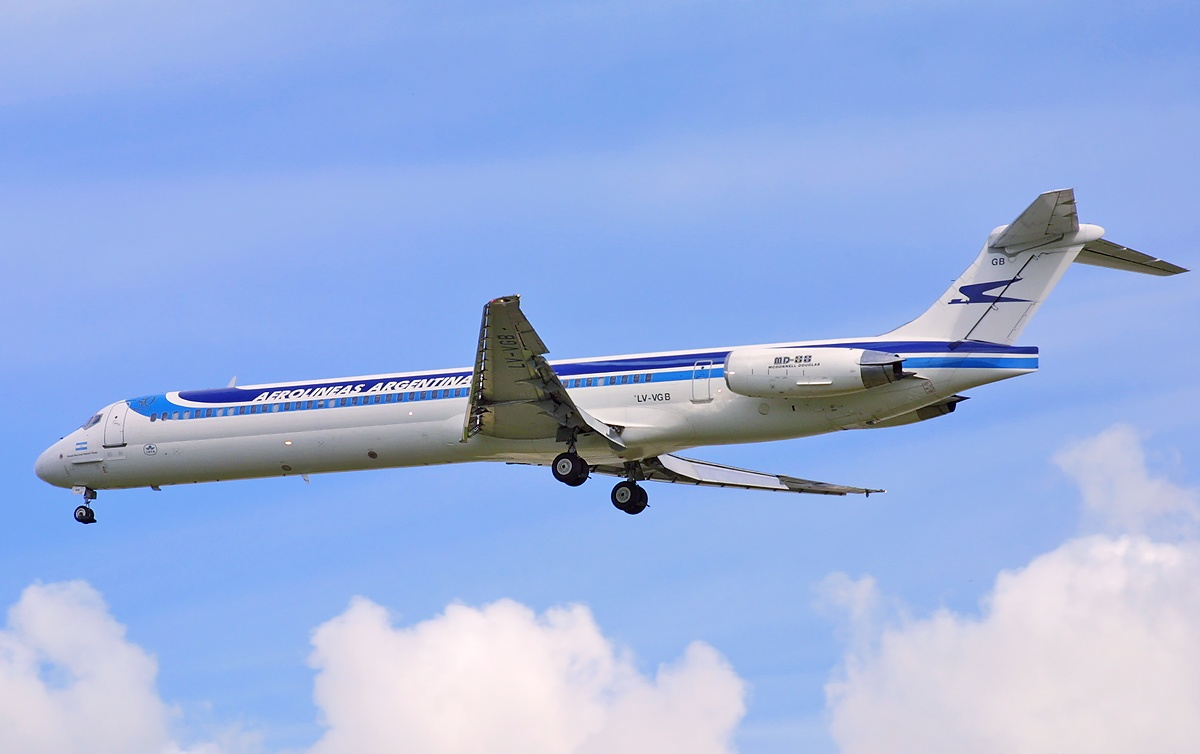
MD-88, 2002

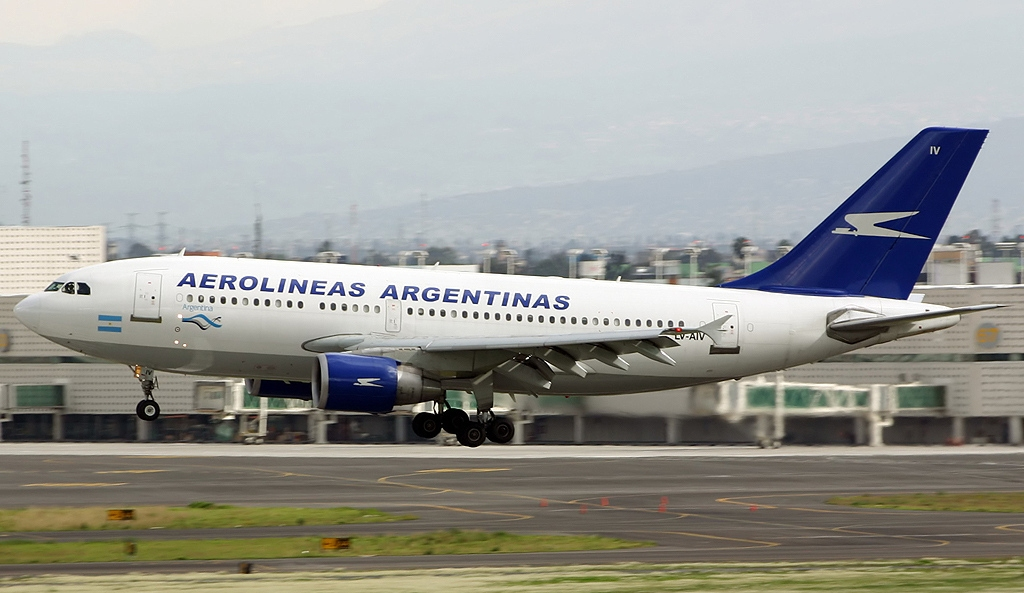
Airbus A310-300, 2007

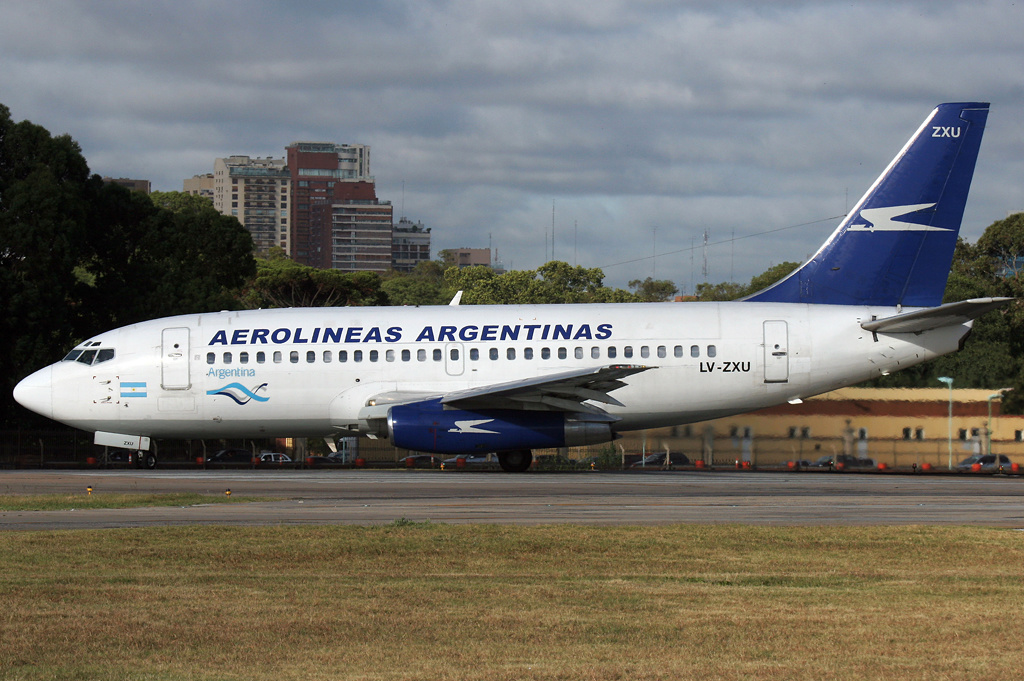
A Boeing 737-200 at Aeroparque Jorge Newbery in 2009. A number of aircraft of this type had been leased from Pegasus Aviation in 1999.

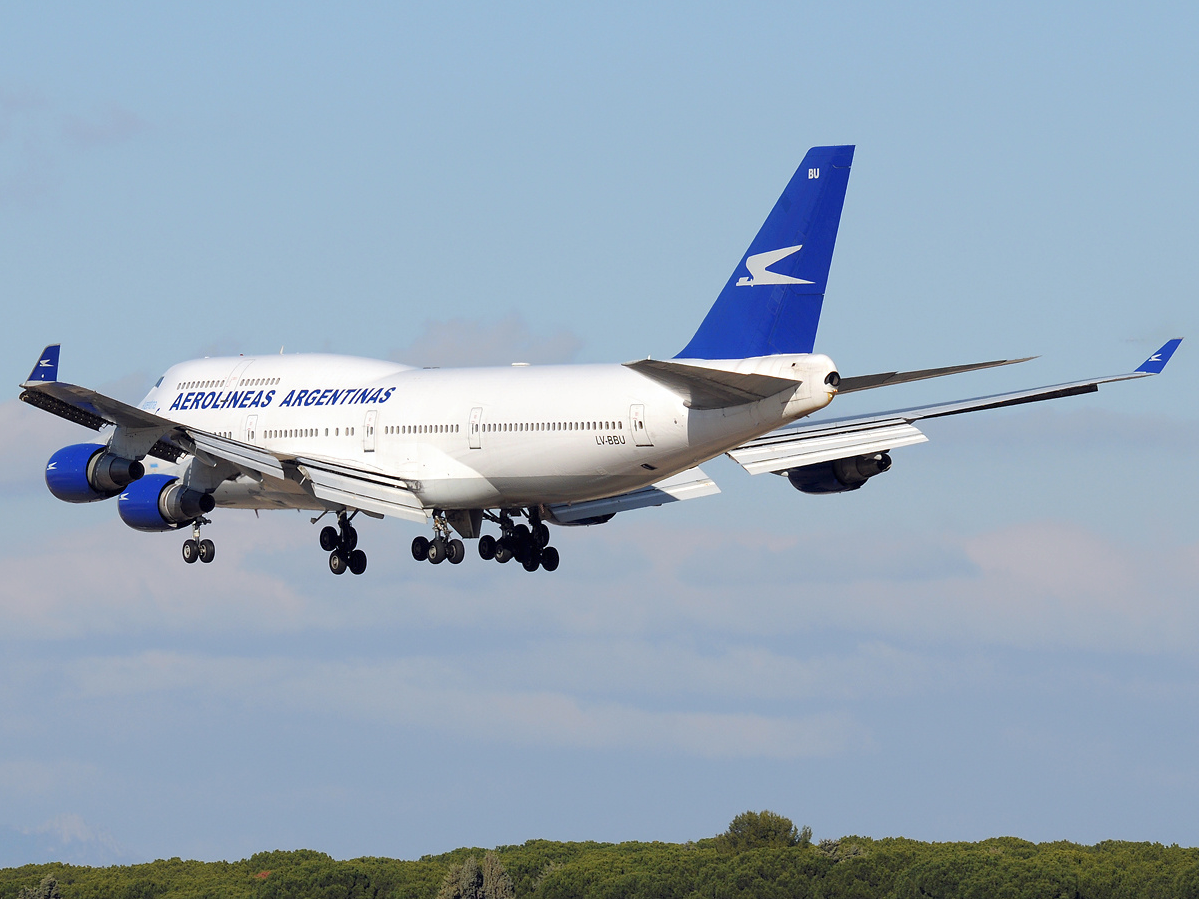
A Boeing 747-400, 2009

Aerolíneas Argentinas previously operated the following aircraft:

- Airbus A310-300
- Airbus A320-200
- Airbus A340-200
- Airbus A340-300
- Avro York
- Boeing 707-320B
- Boeing 707-320C
- Boeing 727-100
- Boeing 727-200
- Boeing 737-200
- Boeing 737-200 Advanced
- Boeing 737-200C
- Boeing 737-300F
- Boeing 737-500
- Boeing 747-200B
- Boeing 747-400
- Boeing 747SP
- Sud Aviation SE-210 Caravelle III
- Sud Aviation SE-210 Caravelle VI-N
- Sud Aviation SE-210 Caravelle VI-R
- Convair CV-240
- de Havilland Comet 4
- de Havilland Comet 4C
- Douglas DC-3 (includes C-47 variants)
- Douglas DC-4 (includes C-54 variants)
- Douglas DC-6
- Fokker F28 Mk-1000
- Fokker F28 Mk-4000
- Hawker Siddeley 748
- Lockheed Constellation
- McDonnell Douglas MD-83
- McDonnell Douglas MD-88
- NAMC YS-11-100
- Short Sandringham
- Vickers VC.1 Viking

=== Recent developments ===
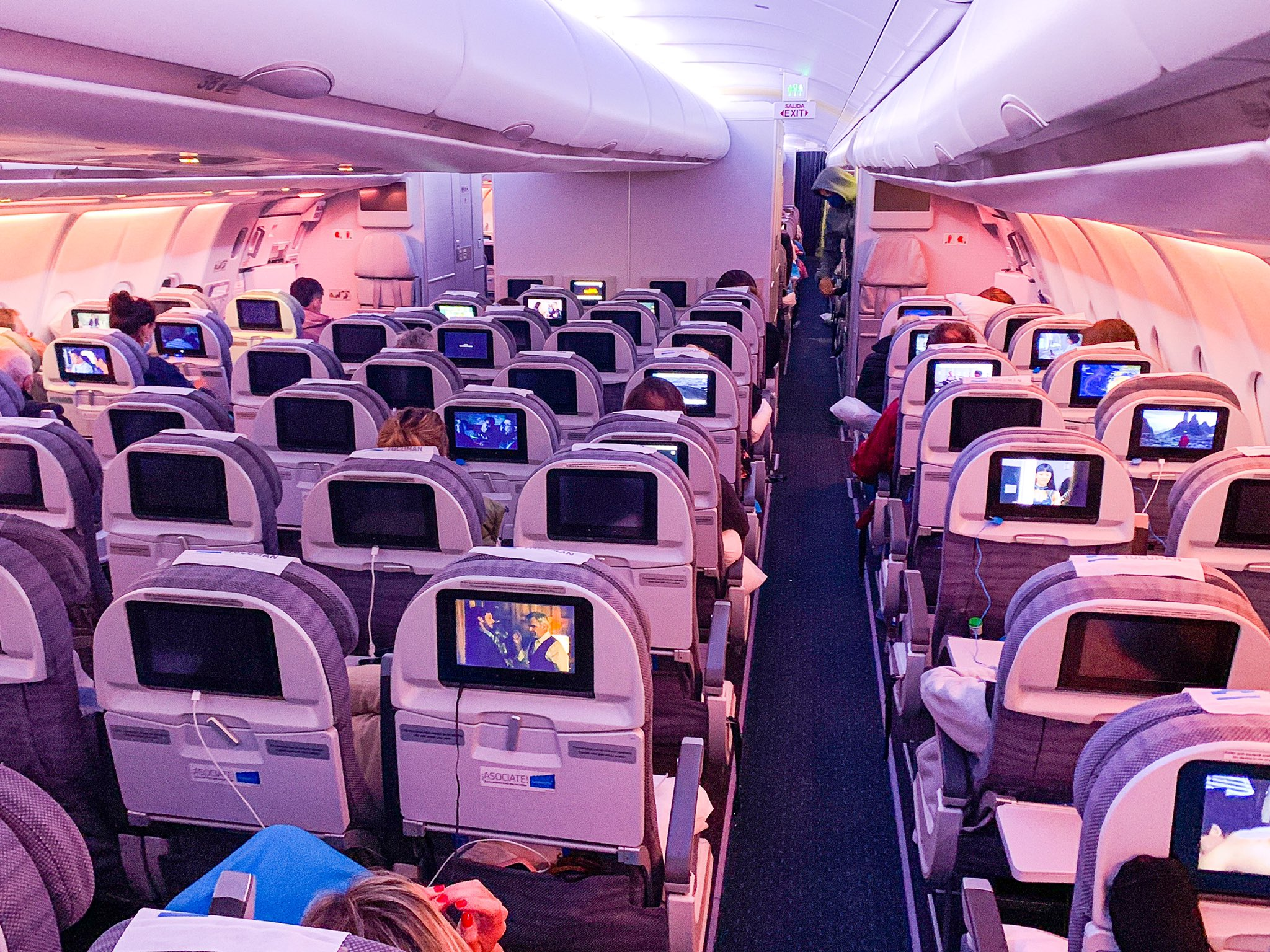
Airbus A330-200 economy class cabin

Aerolíneas Argentinas began to modernise its fleet in 2009, when it agreed to lease 10 Boeing 737-700s and to purchase two more of these aircraft that would act as a replacement for the ageing Boeing 737-200s and MD-80s. Along with the first leased ones, the two brand new aircraft, which became the first ones acquired by the company in 17 years, were incorporated into the fleet in mid 2009. In October 2009, the carrier had announced it was looking for about six Boeing 737-800 aircraft, both to complement the 12 Boeing 737-700s and to replace the ageing Boeing 737-500s. In November, the Boeing 737-200 made its last flight on a scheduled Buenos Aires–Catamarca–La Rioja–Buenos Aires passenger service. In late November 2010, the airline agreed to lease a further ten aircraft of the –700 series from ILFC, which started being delivered in April 2011. As of November 2012, the airline was considering both the Airbus A350-900 and the Boeing 787-9 as replacement aircraft for the long-haul fleet. The incorporation of leased Airbus A330-200s in 2013 for serving routes to Bogotá, Cancún, Caracas and Miami was also planned, whereas an increased maximum takeoff weight version of the same type was also under consideration to partly replace the Airbus A340-200s by 2016.

In April 2013, Air Lease Corporation announced the lease of six Boeing 737-800s to the company, with deliveries starting in November 2014; in May 2013, CIT Group announced the lease of four additional aircraft of the same type, with deliveries starting in January 2014. In October that year, an agreement for the acquisition of 20 more aircraft of the type, worth US$1.8 billion, was announced. In addition to the lease of four used Airbus A330-200s from ILFC —the first of them delivered in September 2013— Aerolíneas Argentinas signed in November a memorandum of understanding with Airbus, aimed at acquiring four more aircraft of the type. In a transaction worth US$887 million, the order was firmed up in February 2014. These aircraft will be fitted with GE Aviation CF6-80E1 engines. The first Airbus A330-200 directly purchased from Airbus was delivered in March 2015.

With its ageing long-haul fleet in need of replacement, Aerolineas CEO Mario Dell’Acqua stated in November 2017 that the company was evaluating a replacement for the Airbus A340, with a decision to be made in 2018. The company was considering either the Boeing 787 or the Airbus A350 as possible replacements, with the intention of the new fleet entering service in 2020. The Airbus A330 will also be replaced as part of the long-haul fleet replacement, though they are to be retired progressively after the A340s. In November 2017, Aerolíneas Argentinas became the first Latin American airline in taking delivery of a Boeing 737 MAX 8; the aircraft flew its first revenue service on the Buenos Aires-Ezeiza–Mendoza route.

=== Livery ===
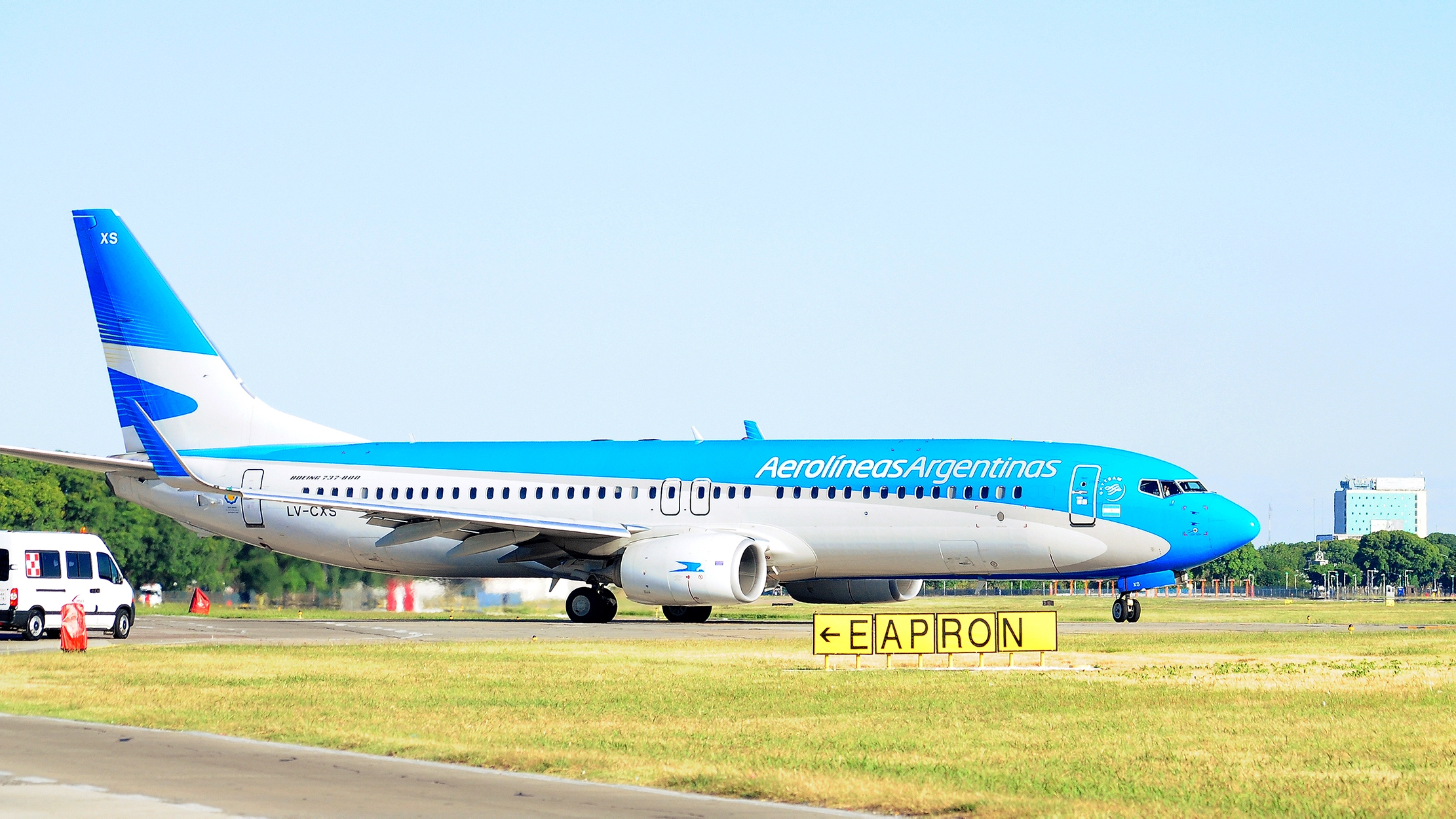
Boeing 737-800

In June 2010, Aerolíneas Argentinas revamped its image to give the airline a more modern appearance. The new logo is a combination of light blue and grey colours. Likewise, the previous eurowhite livery is replaced with a combination of the Argentine flag colours plus grey. Subsidiary airline Austral also adopted this new livery, additionally including a red cheatline.

== Accidents and incidents ==
According to the Aviation Safety Network database, the last fatal accident at the airline was in 1970. As of June 2023, Aviation Safety Network records 47 accidents or incidents for Aerolíneas Argentinas since it started operations in 1950. The company ranks among the safest airlines in the world.

== See also ==
- Transport in Argentina
