= Argentine Marxist–Leninist Communist Party =

Argentine Marxist–Leninist Communist Party Partido Comunista Marxista–Leninista Argentino
- Abbreviation: PCMLA
- General Secretary: Oscar Ríos
- Founded: 1975
- Dissolved: 1982
- Split from: Marxist–Leninist Communist Party
- Merged into: Liberation Party
- Ideology: Communism; Marxism-Leninism; Maoism
- Political position: Far-left

The Argentine Marxist–Leninist Communist Party (Spanish: Partido Comunista Marxista–Leninista Argentino, abbreviated PCMLA) was a communist party in Argentina. PCMLA was founded in 1975 as splinter group of the Marxist–Leninist Communist Party. It had a pro-China orientation. Leaders of PCMLA included Oscar Ríos (general secretary), José Ríos (organizational secretary), Daniel Egea, Carlos Herrera, and Ramón Ruiz. The party was active in the student movement. Its student wing was Grupos de Resistencia Estudiantil (GRE, 'Student Resistance Groups'). It had cells in Buenos Aires city, Buenos Aires province, Corrientes, Entre Ríos and Santa Fe. The party had a front organization in the meat industry, Resistencia Obrera de la Carne (ROC, Meat Workers Resistance).

The military junta designated PCMLA as a 'band of terrorist criminals'. On May 30, 1976, PCMLA guerrillas captured colonel Juan Alberto Pita, the person the military junta had put in charge of the Confederación General del Trabajo (CGT), in Manuel B. Gonnet (generally referred to as "Gonnet"), a neighborhood in La Plata City, Argentina.

In 1978 the party suffered state repression and began to disintegrate. In 1982 PCMLA merged with PCML, forming the Liberation Party.
