= Grupo Marsans =

Spanish company

Grupo Marsans was a private Spanish consortium mainly dedicated to tour operations. It had operations in Spain, France, Italy, Brazil, Mexico, Venezuela, and Argentina, as well as representations in Latin America. Grupo Marsans was a subsidiary of Autobuses Urbanos del Sur, S.A. It was based in Madrid, Spain.

The consortium was the parent company of Air Comet and charter airline AirPlus, and participated, along with SAS, in the Spanair's owner holding.

== History ==
The company was founded in 1910 by Rafael Almeida and Armando Marsans, from whom it took the name. Grupo Marsans was privatised in 1985, when it was acquired by the Trapsa holding, headed by Gonzalo Pascual and Gerardo Díaz Ferrán; it had previously been part of the Spanish consortium INI.

In late 2006, the group placed an order with Airbus for 12 Airbus A330-200s plus ten options, in a deal worth US$2 billion, concluding a memorandum of understanding (MoU) signed earlier that year, during the Farnborough Airshow; the first of these aircraft that had been taken delivery of, in August 2008, was incorporated into the Air Comet's fleet. Another MoU was signed with Airbus in October 2007, this time for the purchase of 61 more aircraft, and in November that year, Marsans boosted the A330-200 commitment by placing a firm order for five more of these aircraft, plus 12 Airbus A319s, 25 Airbus A320s, five Airbus A321s, ten Airbus A350-900s and four Airbus A380s. In December the same year, Grupo Marsans bidded for a small stake in Spanair, then owned by the SAS Group, but withdrew its interest in February 2008 arguing that SAS made the bidding public.

=== Financial difficulties and downfall ===
According to Spanish newspaper ABC, the downfall of Grupo Marsans was precipitated by mounting financial difficulties arising from the inability of the management to properly handle the airlines that had been gradually incorporated, which eventually led to a €320 million debt the group was unable to afford. In April 2010, the Marsans' license for selling air tickets was revoked by the International Air Transport Association; this occurred the same day a Spanish court declared the insolvency of Air Comet, an airline controlled by the group. In June that year, Grupo Marsans was sold to Posibilitum Business for US$720 million (€600 million), with approximately half this amount being debts.

== Subsidiaries ==
=== Aerolíneas Argentinas ===
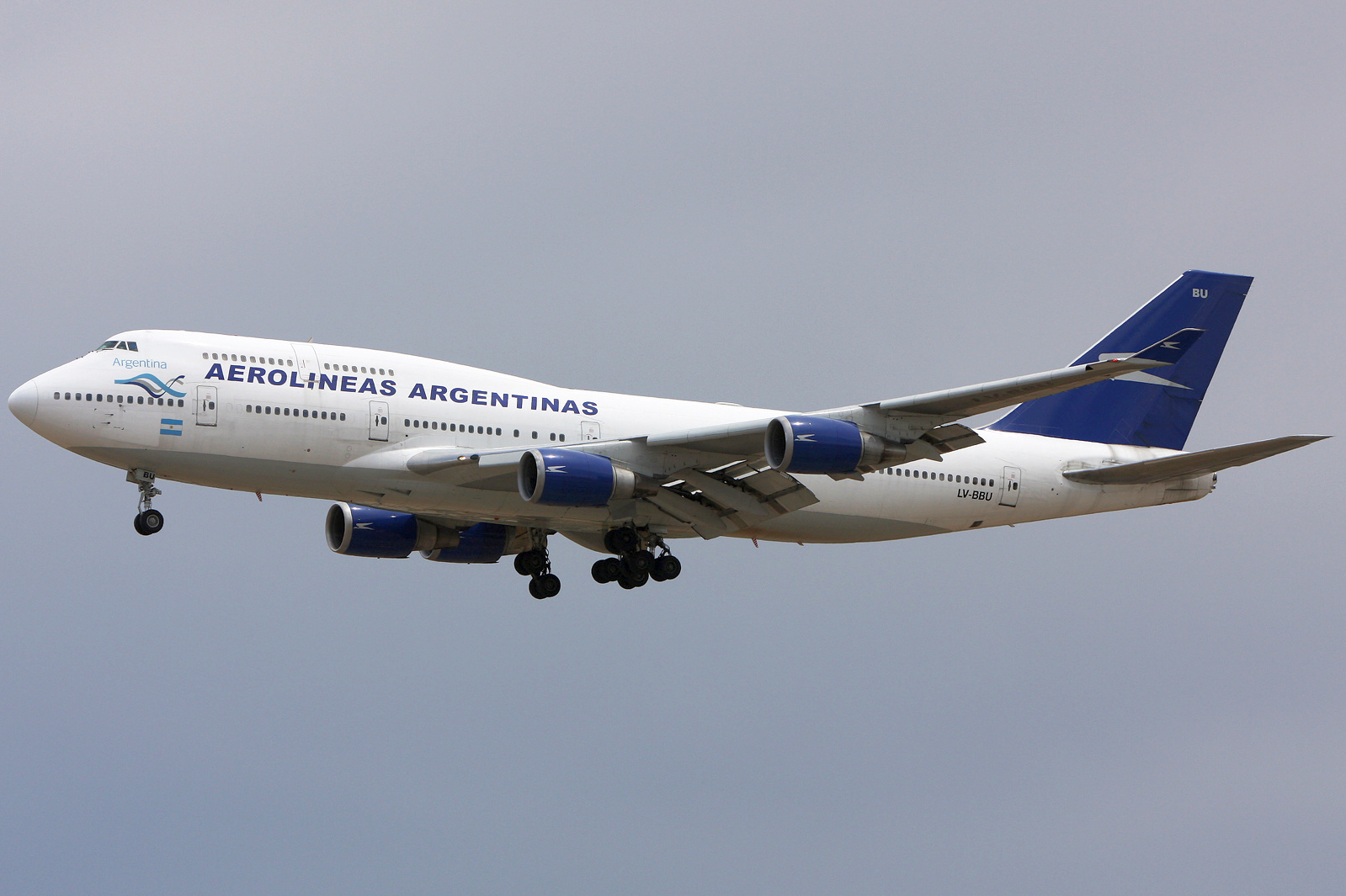
An Aerolíneas Argentinas Boeing 747-400 arrives at Barajas Airport in 2009. Grupo Marsans bought into the carrier in 2001; in 2008, the government of Argentina expropriated the airline.

In October 2001, 92% of Aerolíneas Argentinas was assigned to Grupo Marsans by the SEPI, which had controlled the Argentine carrier since February 2000, with the group committing to acknowledge half the debt of the airline at that time, around US$615 million, and to inject another US$50 million. Along with its domestic subsidiary Austral Líneas Aéreas, Aerolíneas Argentinas was owned by Marsans until both carriers were renationalised in late 2008. In July that year, Marsans agreed to sell the airline back to the Argentine government; a contract was signed to look for a third-party to evaluate the price of the transaction, should the parties involved not come to an agreement, but the government took over the airline after negotiations with Grupo Marsans broke down over the difference for that price (Credit Suisse valued the company at US$450 million for Marsans, whereas an Argentine court said the airline was worth −US$600 million) and allegations of mismanagement. According to MercoPress, Grupo Marsans began a steady decline in 2008, when control of the airline was taken over by the Argentine government.

=== AeBal-Spanair Link ===
AeBal, Aerolíneas de Baleares was established in 1999 and started operations on 5 July 2000 from Madrid with domestic services and an initial fleet of three Boeing 717 aircraft. It was originally named Aerolíneas Baleares Blue Star, but has operated under the AeBal-Spanair Link name, whilst retaining much of its Spanair pedigree in the livery. It was owned by Grupo Marsans (51%), SAS Group (25%), Spanair (18%) and VITRAC (6%) and had 155 employees (at March 2007). A number of changes in the shareholding structure of the company ended up with SAS Group owning 100% of the company.

=== Aerolíneas del Sur ===
This was a Chile-based airline that commenced operations in December 2005. Aerolíneas del Sur was later rebranded as Air Comet Chile, and served several destinations within the country, including Antofagasta, Calama, Concepción, Iquique, Punta Arenas, Puerto Montt and Santiago.

=== Air Comet ===
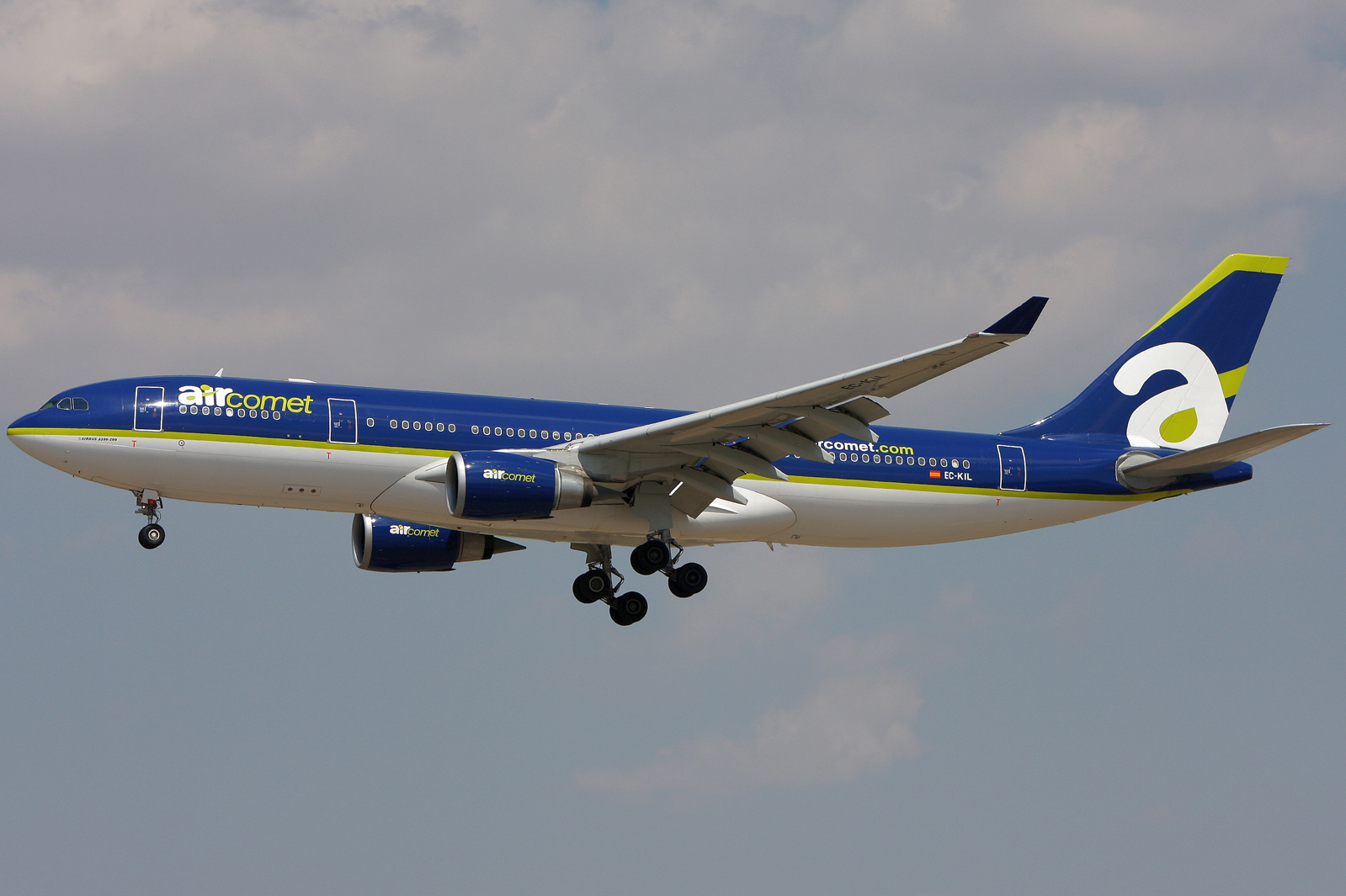
Marsans received the first A330-200 on behalf of Air Comet in 2008; this subsidiary folded in late 2009, precipitating the group's downfall.

The airline was created in 1996, and served primarily Latin American destinations, including Buenos Aires, Havana, Guayaquil, Lima and Quito. In December 2009, all flights were suspended following the ruling of a London court that ordered the impoundment of the carrier's 13-strong fleet. The decision was made over a US$24.4 million debt with HSH Nordbank for the lease of aircraft, some of them property of an Irish firm. The airline had its operator's certificate cancelled by the Spanish Development Ministry a day after operations were disrupted. At the time of closure, the company owed its employees some €7 million in wages, and they had not been paid for six months.

=== Spanair ===
Baleares-based Spanair was founded in December 1986 by SAS and Teinver, a holding owned by Gonzalo Pascual and Gerado Díaz Ferrán. It started operations as a charter carrier in 1988; scheduled services within Spain commenced in February 1994, and intercontinental flights were launched in 1997. Teinver, which was in turn owned by Marsans, held a 51% controlling stake in the airline until 2001, when SAS boosted its participation in the carrier to 75%.
