= Gerardo Díaz Ferrán =

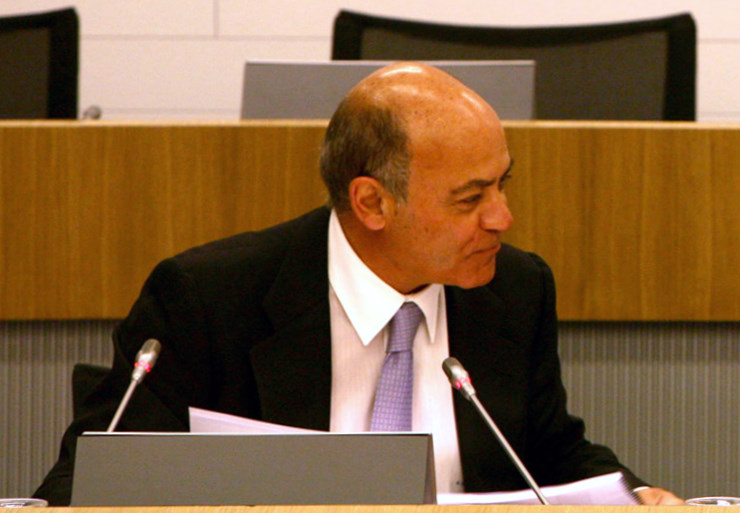
Gerardo Díaz Ferrán at the CEOE

Gerardo Díaz Ferrán (Madrid, 1942) is a Spanish Businessman.

He was co-owner with Gonzalo Pascual of Grupo Marsans that was sold in June 2010. He was from 2007 until 2010 president of CEOE, the Spanish business community.

After the bankruptcy of all his companies, on November 29, 2010, the Madrid Business court number 5, filed the personal Chapter 11 to Gerardo Díaz Ferrán.

In December 2012 he was arrested and charged with concealment of assets and money laundering, and held in prison until his release in February 2018.
