= List of airlines of Spain =

This is a list of airlines of Spain. The list includes only airlines having an Air Operator Certificate issued by the Civil Aviation Authority of Spain.

== Scheduled airlines ==
| Airline | IMAGE | IATA | ICAO | Callsign | Commenced operations | Notes |
|---|---|---|---|---|---|---|
| Air Europa | | UX | AEA | EUROPA | 1986 | |
| Air Europa Express | | UX | OVA | Aeronova | 1996/2016 | At the beginning of 2016, Air Europa bought Aeronova as a low-cost subsidiary, renaming it Air Europa Express (not to be confused with the already dissolved Air Europa Express (1996)). |
| Air Nostrum | | YW | ANE | NOSTRUM AIR | 1994 | Regional franchise of Iberia. |
| AlbaStar | | AP | LAV | | 2010 | |
| Binter Canarias | | NT | IBB | BINTER/CANAIR | 1989 | |
| Canaryfly | | PM | CNF | | 2010 | |
| Iberia | | IB | IBE | IBERIA | 1927 | Flag carrier |
| Iberia Express | | I2 | IBS | IBERIAEXPRES | 2012 | Low-cost branch of Iberia (airline). |
| LEVEL | | LL | LVL | DALI | 2017 | |
| Plus Ultra Líneas Aéreas | | PU | PUE | SPANISH | 2012 | |
| Volotea | | V7 | VOE | VOLOTEA | 2012 | |
| Vueling | | VY | VLG | VUELING | 2004 | |

== Charter airlines ==
| Airline | IMAGE | IATA | ICAO | Callsign | Commenced operations | Notes |
|---|---|---|---|---|---|---|
| Iberojet | | E9 | EVE | EVELOP | 2013 | |
| Executive Airlines (Spain) | | | EXU | SACAIR | | |
| Gestair | | GP | GES | GESTAIR | 1977 | |
| Helicópteros del Sureste | | | | | | |
| Inaer | | UV | INR | | 1965 | |
| Mayoral Executive Jet | | | MYO | MAYORAL | 1985 | |
| Privilege Style | | | PVG | PRIVILEGE | 2003 | |
| Swiftair | | WT | SWT | SWIFT | 1986 | |
| Wamos Air | | EB | PLM | PULMANTUR | 2003 | Formerly called Pullmantur Air. |
| World2fly | | 2W | WFL | BLUE WORLD | 2019 | |

== Cargo airlines ==
| Airline | IMAGE | IATA | ICAO | Commenced operations | Notes |
|---|---|---|---|---|---|
| Cygnus Air | | | RGN | 2013 | |

== See also ==
- List of airlines
- List of airlines of Europe
- List of defunct airlines of Spain
