= Audeli Air =

Spanish charter airline

Audeli (Gestair Airlines)
IATA	ICAO	Call sign
-	ADI	AUDELI
- Founded: 1987
- Ceased operations: 2005
- Fleet size: 3
- Headquarters: Madrid, Spain
- Website: http://www.gestair.com

Audeli (Gestair Airlines) is an aircraft operator based in Madrid, Spain. It operates passenger aircraft on a wet-lease (ACMI - Aircraft, Crew, Maintenance and Insurance) basis for Iberia Airlines. It also manages a corporate aircraft for Inveravante. It is owned by Cygnus Air (Gestair Cargo) (99%), a member company of Grupo Gestair.

The airline is no longer operating.

== Destinations ==
Gestair Airlines operates daily to Santo Domingo and 4 times per week to Rio de Janeiro.

== Fleet ==
The Gestair Airlines fleet consists of the following aircraft (at March 2009):

- 2 Airbus A340-300 (which are operated for Iberia)
- 1 Embraer Legacy 600
