= Air Europa Express (1996) =

Airline company

IATA	ICAO	Call sign
UX	PMI	EUROPA
- Founded: 1996
- Ceased operations: 2001
- Hubs: Palma de Mallorca Airport
- Frequent-flyer program: Flying Blue and Fidelitas (now Suma)
- Parent company: Air Europa and Globalia Corp.
- Headquarters: Llucmajor, Mallorca, Spain

Air Europa Express was a Spanish subsidiary airline of Air Europa from 1996 till 2001 with its base at Palma de Mallorca Airport.

== History ==
In 1996 Spanish airline Air Europa founded a regional airline to carry out its shorter and regional routes from the base at Palma de Mallorca Airport. The airline were a livery similar to the one of Air Europa only that an "Express" title was added to the fuselage.

In 2001 the airline ceased all operations due to low demand and economic problems as well as by an effect of the 9/11 attacks.

In 2015 the Globalia group bought Spanish regional airline Aeronova in preparation of restarting an airline with the name of Air Europa Express. The Air Europa Express started operations in January 2016 still under the AOC of Aeronova.

== Fleet ==
The fleet of Air Europa consisted of a large number of BAe ATP aircraft as well as a single Boeing 737-300 during the period from June to December 1998.

Air Europa fleet
Aircraft	In Fleet	Note
BAe ATP	10	
Total	10	
