= Air Dominicana =

Dominican airline

IATA	ICAO	Call sign
ED	RDO	AIRDOM
- Founded: 9 May 2007
- Ceased operations: 21 September 2009
- Hubs: Las Américas International Airport
- Fleet size: 0
- Destinations: 3 were planned
- Parent company: Air Europa
- Headquarters: Santo Domingo
- Key people: Juan José Hidalgo (President)
- Website: airdominicana.com.do/

Air Dominicana was the flag carrier airline for the Dominican Republic. It planned to begin operations in October 2009 using a Boeing 737-400 aircraft with daily services to New York City and Miami. A second Boeing 737 was due to join the fleet later. Its headquarters were on the fourth floor of the Air Europa building in Santo Domingo.

== History ==
Air Dominicana was incorporated on 9 May 2007 in Santo Domingo with a capital of US$10 million. On 15 December 2008, the US Department of Transportation issued an FAA license which granted Air Dominicana the right to operate flights to the United States.

The airline was expected to begin its operations in May 2008 with a Boeing 737-300, but the launch date was postponed several times until 16 October 2009. Originally Punta Cana International Airport was supposed to be Air Dominicana's hub, but this was later switched to Las Américas International Airport in Santo Domingo.

== Ownership ==
Air Dominicana was owned by Air Europa with the Dominican Government as a minority partner. Originally, Dominicana Air was also owned by Futura International Airways until the airline failed to re-finance itself, therefore ceasing operations on 8 September 2008. Air Europa was expected to take the remaining shares which Futura left behind. This deal never came into being, which might have been a reason for the subsequent bankruptcy.

== Destinations ==
Air Dominicana planned to launch services with flights to Miami and New York City from Santo Domingo.

== Fleet ==
The Air Dominicana fleet consisted of the following aircraft (at 1 October 2010):

Air Dominicana Fleet
Aircraft	In Fleet	Orders	Passengers	Notes
Boeing 737-300	1	0	148	Returned
Boeing 737-400	1	0	156	Returned

The average fleet age of the Air Dominicana fleet was 21.4 years (at 1 October 2010).
