= Sky Service Aviation =

Spanish charter airline

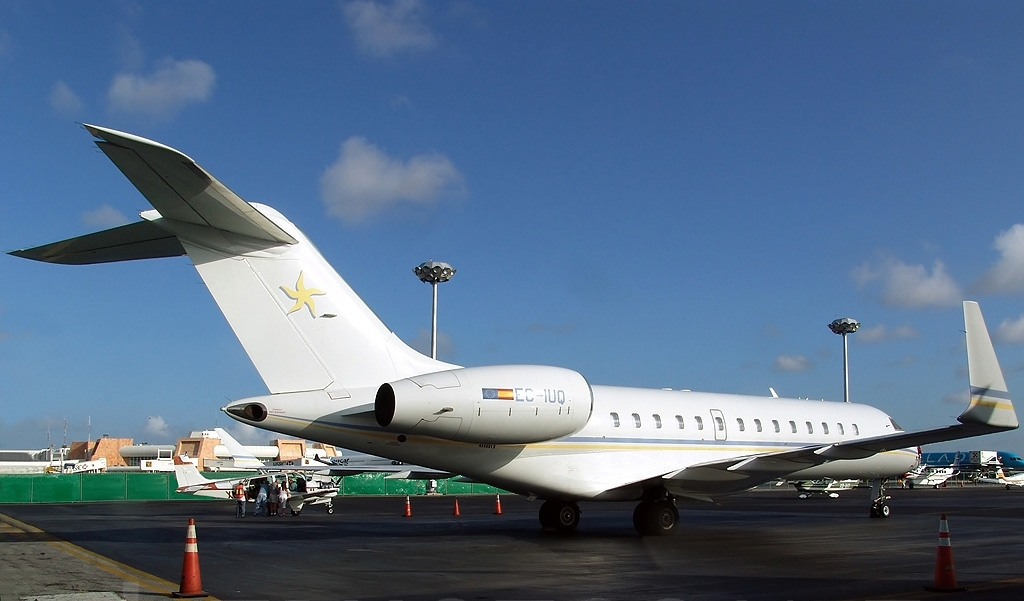
- Sky Service Aviation Bombardier BD-700 at Cancun Airport
IATA	ICAO	Call sign
-	SKT	-
- Commenced operations: 1992
- Ceased operations: 2005
- Operating bases: Barajas Airport
- Fleet size: Fleet below
- Headquarters: Madrid, Spain
- Key people: José María Espinosa (Director-general)

Sky Service Aviation was a charter airline based in Madrid, Spain.

== History ==
Sky Service Aviation was founded in 1992 and went through a relaunching and expansion in 2002. The company's headquarters were in Alcobendas, Madrid, but it had offices in Barcelona and Palma de Mallorca as well.

On 18 August 2002 one of Sky Service Aviation's airplanes, a Learjet 35A, crash-landed at Asturias Airport. The accident involved no fatalities.

The airline was bought by the MCH holding of Gestair in 2005. Following the purchase its fleet was merged into the fleet of the Gestair group.

== Code data ==
- ICAO Code: SKT (not current)

== Fleet ==
The airline had a number of different aircraft in its fleet according to the period, including:

- 1 Bombardier BD-700
- 1 Dassault Falcon 2000
- 1 Dassault Falcon 900 EX
- 1 Learjet 35A
- 1 Learjet 55B
- 1 Cessna Citation Excel
- 1 Cessna CitationJet
- 4 Eurocopter Colibri EC-120
