= SkyTeam =

Airline alliance

- Launch date: 22 June 2000; 26 years ago
- Full members: 18
- Destination airports: 1,000+
- Destination countries: 160+
- Annual passengers (M): 624
- Headquarters: Amstelveen, Netherlands
- Management: Andrés Conesa (chairman); Patrick Roux (CEO)
- Alliance slogan: The Priority Is You
- Website: skyteam.com

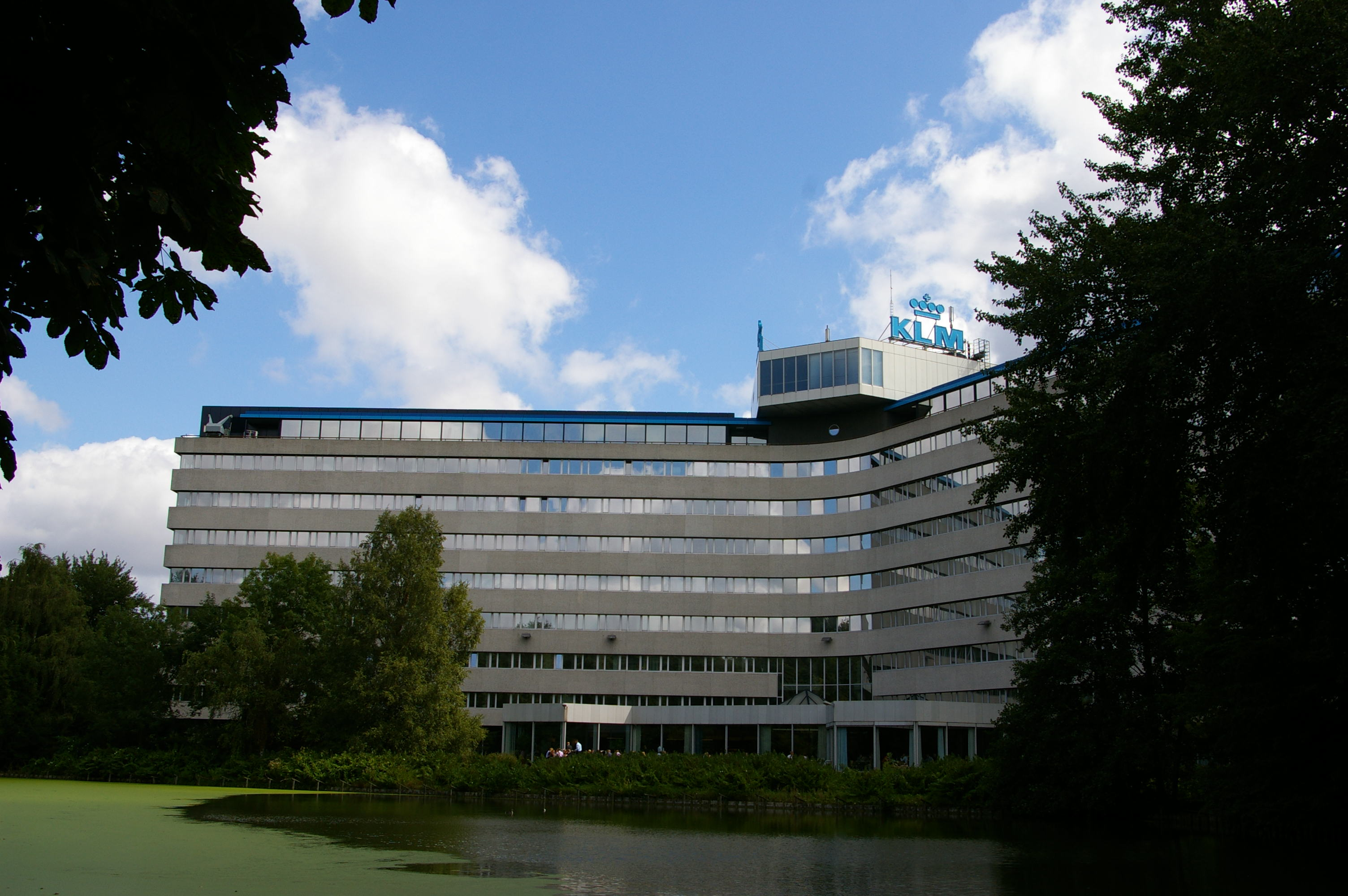
The head office of SkyTeam is in the KLM head office in Amstelveen

SkyTeam is one of the world's three major airline alliances. Founded in June 2000, SkyTeam was the last of the three alliances to be formed, after Star Alliance and Oneworld. Its annual passenger count is 624 million customers (2024), the second largest of the three major alliances. As of May 2025, SkyTeam consists of 18 active carriers; it also operates a cargo alliance named SkyTeam Cargo, which partners with seven carriers, all SkyTeam members. Its centralised management team, SkyTeam Central, is based in Amstelveen, Netherlands.

== History ==
=== Formation and early years ===
On 22 June 2000, representatives of Delta Air Lines, Aeroméxico, Air France, and Korean Air held a meeting in New York to form a third airline alliance. These became the four founding carriers of SkyTeam. Upon its formation, SkyTeam would offer its customers 6,402 daily flights to 451 destinations in 98 countries. In September 2000, the alliance established a cargo alliance, SkyTeam Cargo. The group's inaugural members were Aeromexpress, Air France Cargo, Delta Air Logistics and Korean Air Cargo. The following month, the newly established airline alliance announced its intentions to incorporate CSA Czech Airlines as the 5th member in April of the following year.

The alliance saw the joining of CSA Czech Airlines on 25 March 2001; Alitalia entered SkyTeam on 27 July the same year, with its membership scheduled to become effective 1 November that year. On 30 September 2001, the alliance received KLM's application for membership, following the airline's plans to create a leading airline group with Air France. In 2003, Delta's subsidiary, Delta Express, was replaced by Song. That same year, SkyTeam also launched an improved website focused on providing passengers with more information, increased interactivity and other resources.

=== 2000s: First major expansion, departure of airlines and new initiatives ===
On 24 May 2004, Aeroflot signed a memorandum of understanding with SkyTeam as it intended to become a full member. The event took place in the Kremlin following the airline's application earlier in the year for membership. SkyTeam expressed that Aeroflot has not met the consortium's standards, but that the airline's large hub networks made it ideal for the alliance, and made up for its deficiencies.

On 28 August, China Southern Airlines, the largest carrier of the People's Republic of China, signed a preliminary agreement in Guangzhou in its bid to become a full member. In the presence of some Chinese and airline officials, Yan Zhiqing, the chairman of China Southern Airlines, said, "This agreement-signing event is an important step forward into the future for China Southern Airlines to adapt itself to the need of further reforms and opening to the international community, as it will strengthen the airline's international cooperation and global competitiveness."

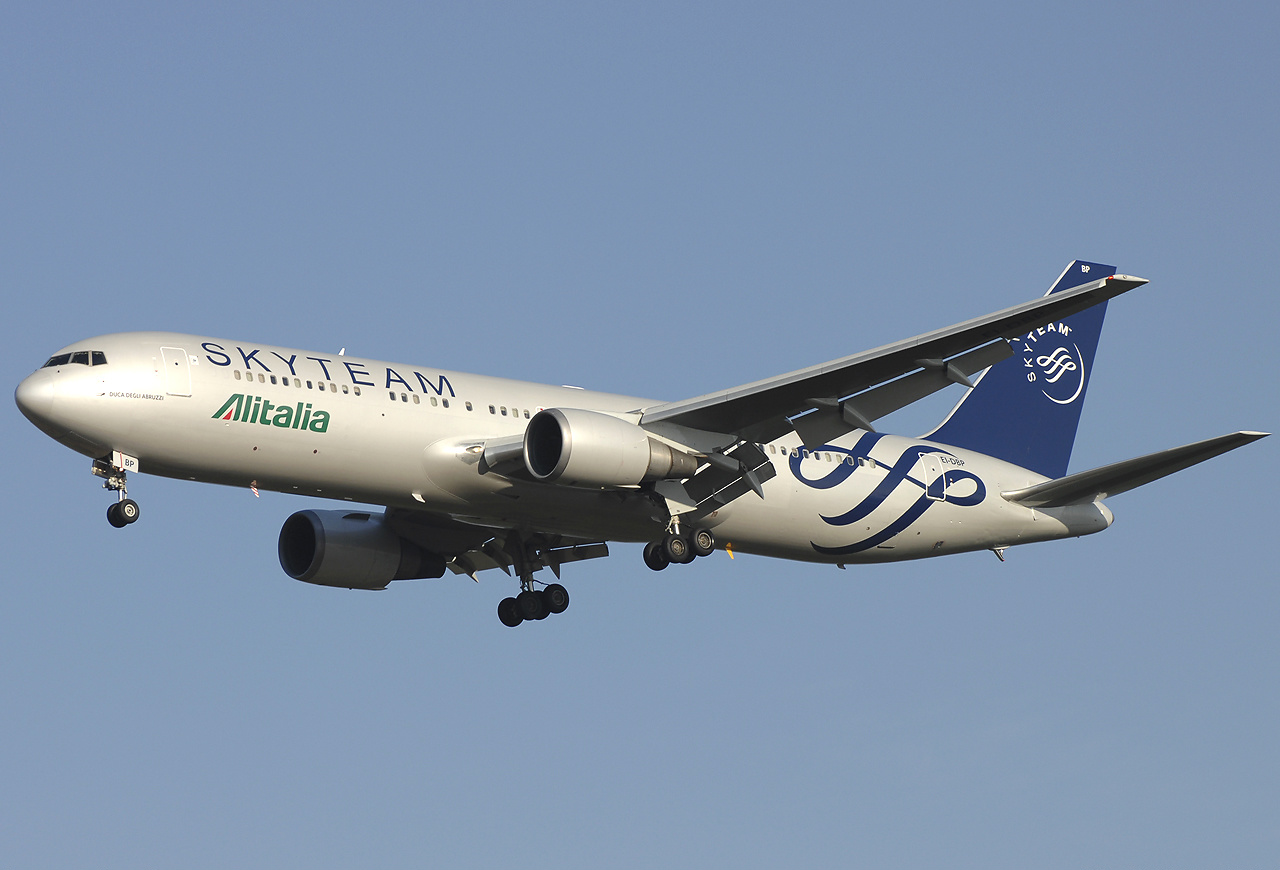
Alitalia Boeing 767-300ER in SkyTeam special livery on approach to Rome Fiumicino Airport in 2009

On 13 September, Continental Airlines, KLM, and Northwest Airlines joined the alliance. Their simultaneous entry was the largest expansion event in airline alliance history. As a result of the three new members, SkyTeam surpassed Oneworld to become the second largest airline alliance, serving more than 341 million customers with 14,320 daily flights to 658 destinations in 130 countries.

Even though member CSA Czech Airlines pledged to help Malév Hungarian Airlines become an associate member of the alliance (as opposed to a full member, an associate has no voting rights), Malév Hungarian Airlines opted to join the Oneworld airline alliance, signing a memorandum of understanding late in May. A few days later, SkyTeam announced four new associate members due to join by 2006, each one being "sponsored" by an existing member: Madrid-based Air Europa (sponsored by Air France), Panama-based Copa Airlines (sponsored and partly owned by Continental Airlines), Kenya Airways (sponsored and partly owned by KLM), and Romania's TAROM (sponsored by Alitalia). Every associate adopted a frequent-flyer program of a full member: Copa Airlines already used Continental's OnePass; Kenya Airways and Air Europa used Air France–KLM's Flying Blue.

Following a 23-month joining process since May 2004, Aeroflot joined on 14 April 2006. It was the first Russian airline to be associated with any airline alliance. Aeroflot had increased its operational standards, passing International Air Transport Association's (IATA) Operational Safety Audit (IOSA). Delta's subsidiary Song continued to operate as Delta Air Lines. In June, it was announced that Portugália would become the alliance's next associate member candidate. However, in November, rival airline and Star Alliance member TAP Air Portugal purchased 99.81% of the airline, bringing a sudden end to its candidacy.

On 4 September 2007, Air Europa, Copa Airlines, (Note: Copa's subsidiary Aero República was never part of the alliance.) and Kenya Airways became members of SkyTeam's Associate program, which was launched to serve airlines in strategic regions which intended to become affiliated with the alliance. China Southern Airlines joined SkyTeam on 15 November to become the 11th full member and the first carrier from China to join the alliance.

In June 2008, following an agreement between Continental Airlines and United Airlines, the former, as well as Copa Airlines, announced their intentions to move to Star Alliance after Continental's final flight with SkyTeam on 24 October 2009. That day, as announced, Continental Airlines and Copa Airlines simultaneously left SkyTeam. Continental Airlines joined Star Alliance three days later; at the time, it was rumored that the switch was Continental's initial move in a United-Continental merger.

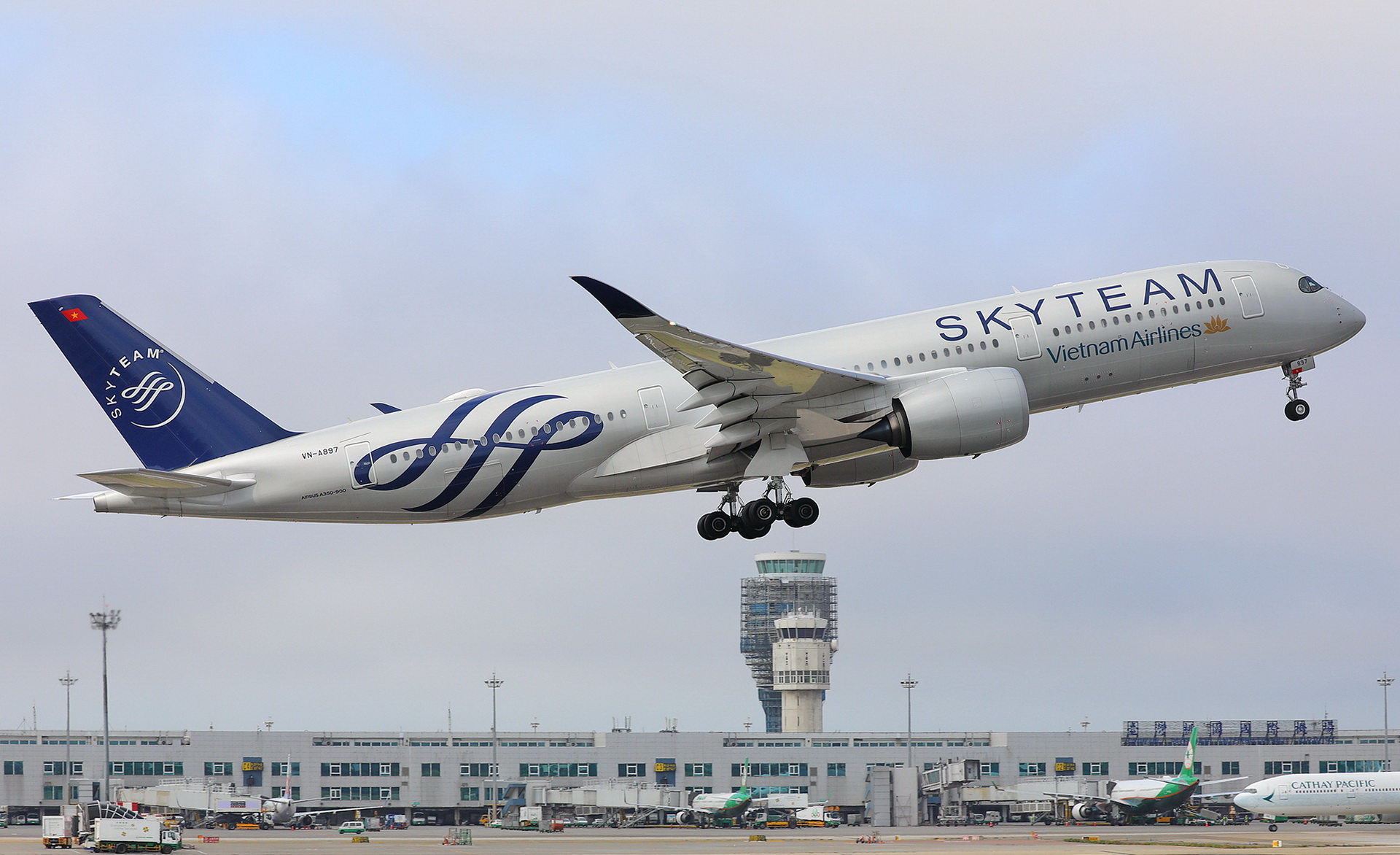
Vietnam Airlines Airbus A350-900 XWB sporting the SkyTeam special livery at Taoyuan International Airport

In April 2009, the alliance signed a preliminary agreement with Vietnam Airlines for the airline to become a full member in 2010. Also in 2009, Alitalia-Linee Aeree Italiane re-launched operations as the new Alitalia, and the alliance announced initiatives towards a centralized management based in Amsterdam. The consortium also named a new managing director, Marie-Joseph Malé, outlined a timeline for the opening of its co-located facilities at London Heathrow Airport, and unveiled a new special livery.

In September 2009, Olympic Air entered into a codeshare agreement with Delta, a deal that was part of Olympic's intention to join SkyTeam and engage in further discussions with Delta's joint venture partner Air France–KLM. However, ties were cut in 2010 when Olympic announced intention to merge with Aegean Airlines, with the merged carrier being a member of Star Alliance, which Aegean was in the process of joining.

=== 2010s: Second major expansion and tenth anniversary ===
To start 2010, Northwest Airlines' and Delta Air Lines' operating certificates were officially combined on 1 January, while on 9 March, China Southern Airlines announced its plans to join SkyTeam Cargo. With membership expected to be granted in November the same year, the airline was to be the first Chinese carrier to join a global air cargo alliance. On 16 April, China Eastern Airlines announced its intention to join SkyTeam, with the official joining ceremony initially expected to occur by mid 2011. The announcement came shortly after the airline's merger with Shanghai Airlines, a member of SkyTeam's rival Star Alliance.

On 10 June, Vietnam Airlines became a full member following a joining ceremony held in Hanoi. The airline became the first SkyTeam carrier from Southeast Asia, where Star Alliance has a strong presence through Singapore Airlines and Thai Airways International. With an extra 20 unique destinations added to SkyTeam's route map, Vietnam Airlines helped to strengthen the alliance's foothold in the region.

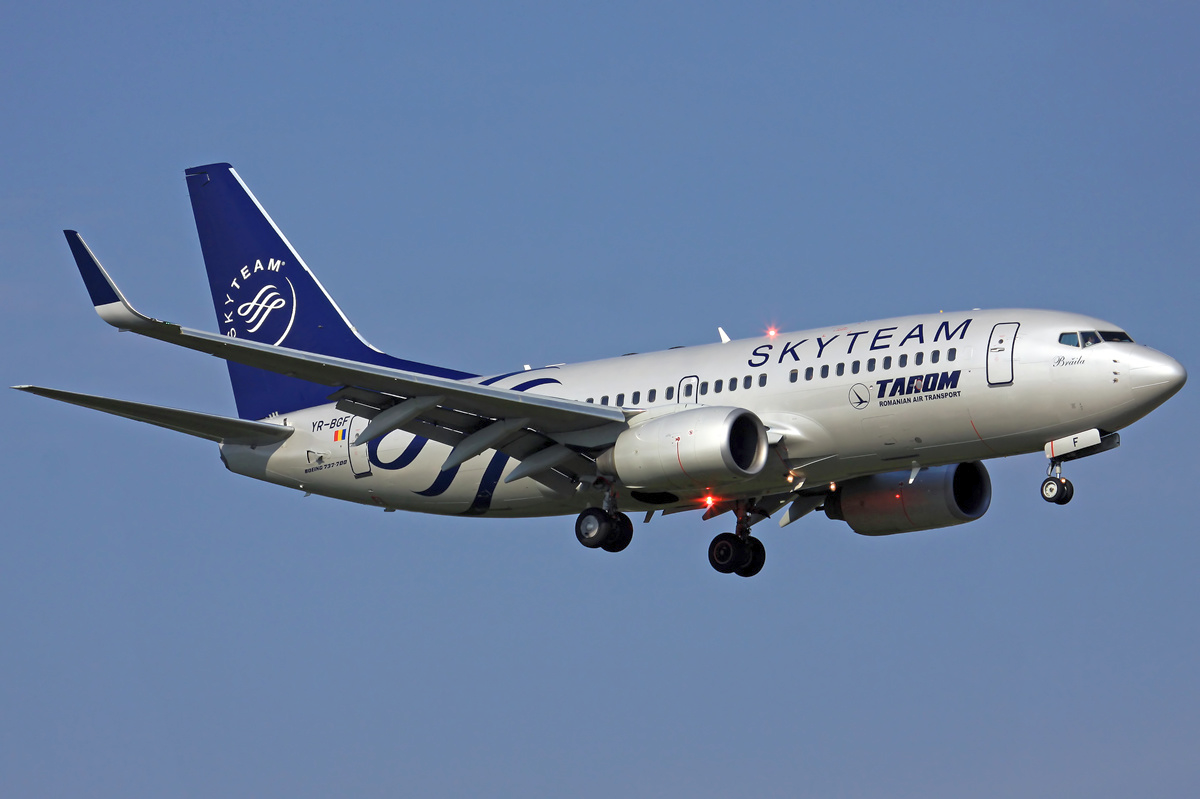
TAROM Boeing 737-700 in SkyTeam special livery on short final to Brussels Airport in 2011

On 22 June, the CEOs and chairmen of the 13 member airlines gathered in New York to celebrate the alliance's 10th anniversary. During its first decade of operation, the world's second-largest airline alliance more than tripled its membership, doubled its flights and nearly doubled its destinations. On the same day, SkyTeam announced that it had renewed its membership program, thereby upgrading Air Europa, Kenya Airways, and TAROM statuses from associate to full members. During the ceremony, the Board outlined its plans to recruit members from Latin America, South America, and India. Three days later, TAROM officially became the 13th SkyTeam member. As a part of the celebration, SkyTeam offered reductions of round-the-world fares and other promotions. Following the 10th anniversary, SkyTeam intended to enhance customers' travel experience and deepen cooperation among its members to supplement the expansion into regions that are yet to have SkyTeam members.

In South America, India and Africa, it is clear there will be a significant battle for positioning to lure good carriers in your alliance.

— Leo van Wijk, chairman during a 10th anniversary event of SkyTeam

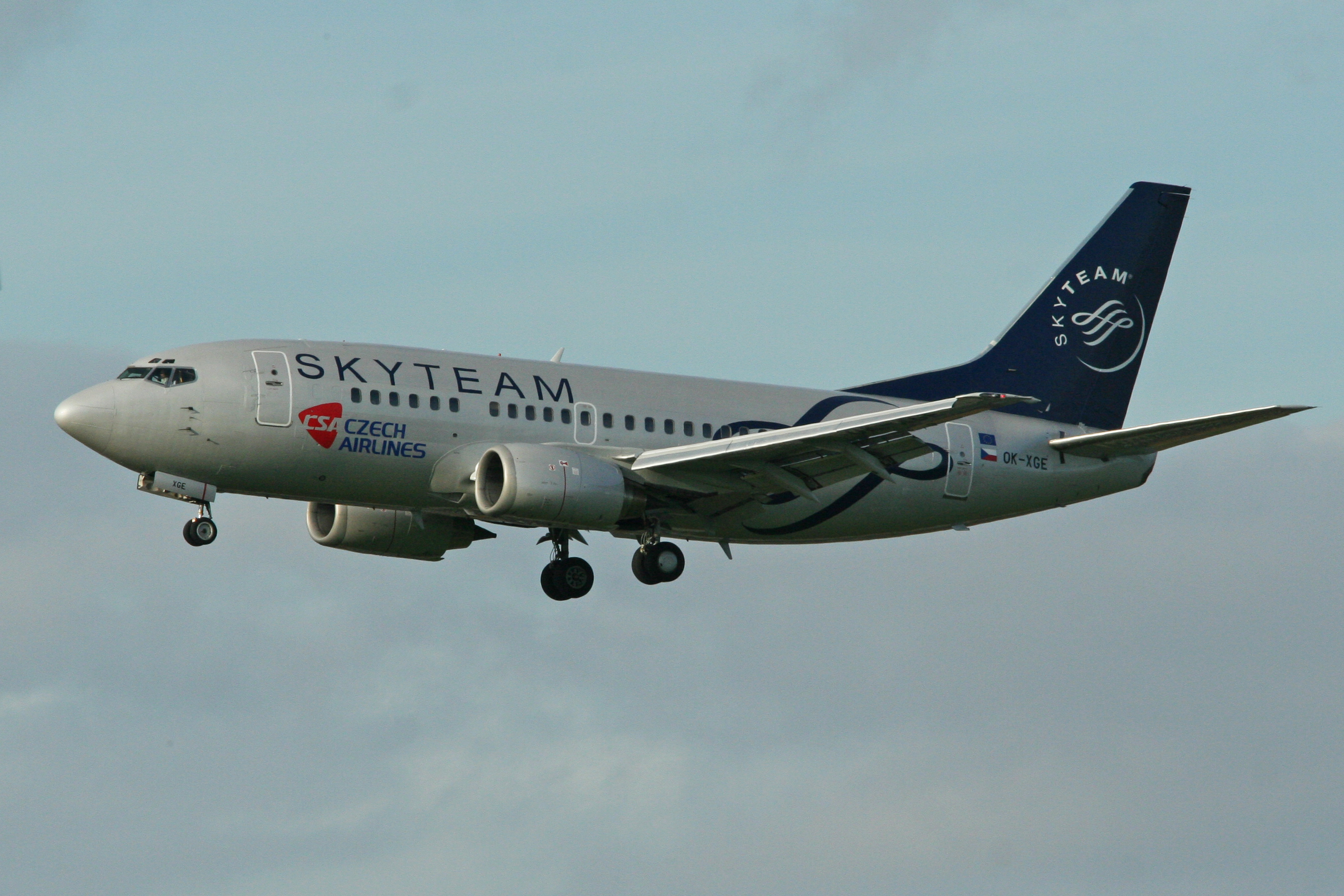
Czech Airlines Boeing 737–500 in SkyTeam special livery in 2012

During the year, Delta Air Lines offered US$1.02 billion to Japan Airlines after the Asian airline filed for bankruptcy due to US$26 billion debt, at the same time lobbying Oneworld's largest member in Asia to switch to SkyTeam. Delta, along with American Airlines, wanted Japan Airlines to be in their respective alliances to benefit from the U.S.–Japan Open Skies agreement. Eventually, Japan Airlines opted to remain at Oneworld, citing that the transfer to SkyTeam would confuse its passengers and may not gain antitrust immunity from U.S. regulators.

SkyTeam received its second application for full membership within five months. China Airlines, Taiwan's flag carrier and largest airline, announced in mid September that it had formally started the joining process. Upon joining, the airline's route network supplemented those of China Southern Airlines and China Eastern Airlines, allowing cooperation among the three airlines. The following month, Aerolíneas Argentinas signed an agreement to officially start the process of becoming the first South American SkyTeam member. The airline was set to join in 2012.

On 1 November, Shanghai Airlines exited from Star Alliance to join SkyTeam in the future under its parent company, future SkyTeam member China Eastern Airlines. This bolstered SkyTeam's presence in the People's Republic of China and surrounding areas, making SkyTeam the number one alliance in the region. Garuda Indonesia formally started its joining process on 23 November and was scheduled to be integrated by 2012.

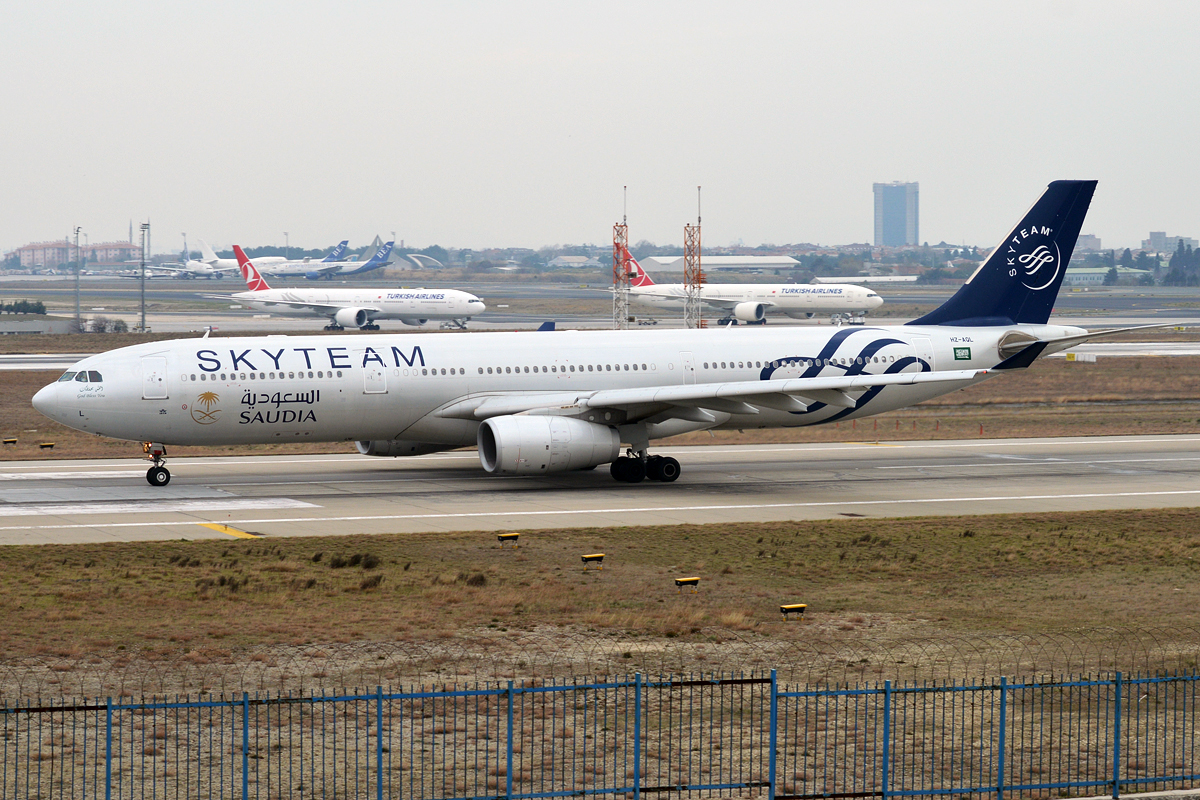
Saudia Airbus A330-300 taxing for takeoff at Atatürk Airport wearing the SkyTeam livery

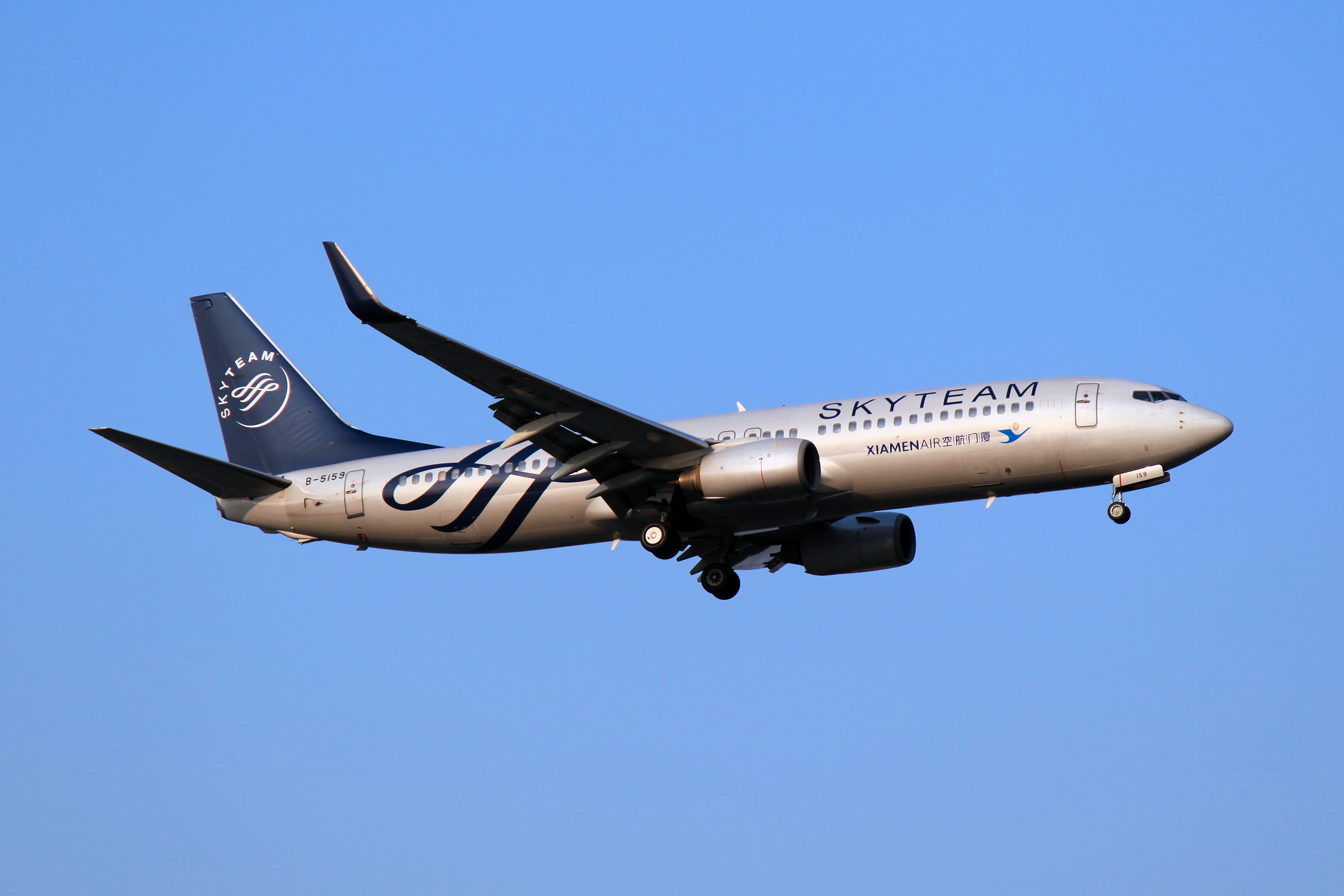
Membership of XiamenAir was activated in November 2012.

On 10 January 2011, Saudi Arabian Airlines signed an agreement to join SkyTeam in 2012. On 28 February the same year, Middle East Airlines agreed to join the alliance. Member airlines Delta and Air France–KLM appointed Goldman Sachs in late February 2011 to advise them on a potential bid for Sir Richard Branson's 51% stake in Virgin Atlantic, which could lead to the airline joining SkyTeam and would sharply increase the alliance's footprint in London. Rivals Star Alliance and Etihad Airways were also investigating competing options about Virgin Atlantic. China Eastern Airlines joined the alliance on 21 June 2011, along with its subsidiary, Shanghai Airlines, to become the 14th member. Later in 2011, on 28 September, China Airlines joined the alliance. In November the same year, XiamenAir committed to be incorporated as a full member by the end of 2012, with their entry supported by China Southern Airlines.

On 29 May 2012, Saudi Arabian Airlines became both the first carrier to join the alliance in 2012 and the first one based in the Middle East, which brought the total members to 16. The same day of its incorporation, Saudi Arabian Airlines was renamed to Saudia. Middle East Airlines became the 17th member of the alliance a month later, following its incorporation on 28 June 2012. On 29 August 2012, Aerolíneas Argentinas became the first South American and the second Latin American airline in joining the alliance, bringing the number of members to 18. Following its incorporation on 21 November 2012, Xiamen Airlines became the fourth member in Mainland China, with the overall number of members in the alliance rising to 19. In late June 2013, the Russian newspaper Kommersant published an article that mentions that Aeroflot was considering leaving the alliance over disagreements with Delta on the pricing on some routes to North America. The report also mentioned that the Russian carrier was considering joining Star Alliance. To assess the benefits of the SkyTeam membership, a study was carried out in July; following it, the Aeroflot board reaffirmed its position within the alliance in September 2013.

Garuda Indonesia became the 20th member of the alliance on 5 March 2014. Garuda initially expected to gain SkyTeam membership in 2012, but the joining process took 40 months to be completed.

On 31 December 2018, China Southern Airlines left the alliance.

On 4 November 2019, the International Airlines Group (IAG) announced it had agreed to terms to purchase Air Europa and that the airline would leave SkyTeam if the deal succeeded. The COVID-19 pandemic and antitrust concerns impeded the sale. Negotiations resumed in March 2022 when IAG agreed to grant Air Europa a €100 million loan convertible into a 20% stake. In February 2023, negotiations were completed and IAG agreed to buy the remaining 80% stake in Air Europa (which it planned to keep as a separate brand but have managed by Iberia) for €400 million, subject to European regulatory approval. In August 2024, IAG abandoned the deal after deeming the additional remedies required to address EU antitrust conditions too onerous to make it viable.

=== 2020s: Third major expansion, COVID-19 pandemic and 25th anniversary ===
On 15 October 2021, Alitalia ceased operations, departing the alliance. Its successor, ITA Airways, joined SkyTeam on 29 October 2021. In 2023, Lufthansa, after confirming its initial acquisition of 41% of ITA Airways, said its plans included gaining total ownership of ITA's shares by 2028 and having the airline leave SkyTeam and join Star Alliance. The European Commission approved Lufthansa Group's purchase of a 41% stake in ITA Airways in July 2024, and on 3 February 2025, ITA Airways announced that it was leaving SkyTeam after being an alliance member for three years following the acquisition; the exiting transition period ended on 30 April 2025, and the airline joined Star Alliance on 1 April 2026.

In February 2022, both Delta and KLM announced plans to suspend their codesharing agreements with Aeroflot in connection with the 2022 Russian invasion of Ukraine. Subsequently, on 27 April, SkyTeam announced that through an agreement with Aeroflot, the carrier's membership was suspended.

On 2 March 2023, Virgin Atlantic joined the alliance, making it the 19th member and the first UK airline of the alliance.

In October 2023, as a part of the restructuring of Scandinavian Airlines' parent company SAS Group, Air France-KLM, along with the Government of Denmark and two financial firms, announced plans to invest in Scandinavian Airlines. In March 2024, the US Bankruptcy Court approved the investment, the Stockholm District Court on 12 June 2024, and the European Commission on 28 June 2024. As a result of the approval for the investment, Scandinavian Airlines left Star Alliance on 31 August 2024 and joined SkyTeam on 1 September 2024.

In September 2024, Eurostar signed a memorandum of understanding to join SkyTeam as its first non-airline partner. This cooperation will enable integrated intermodal transport (air-rail) in the UK, France, Belgium and the Netherlands. Eurostar will join SkyTeam in 2026.

On 26 October 2024, Czech Airlines left SkyTeam and ceased operations following changes in the operating model. The last flight arrived from Paris the following evening.

== Member airlines ==
=== Full members and their member affiliates ===
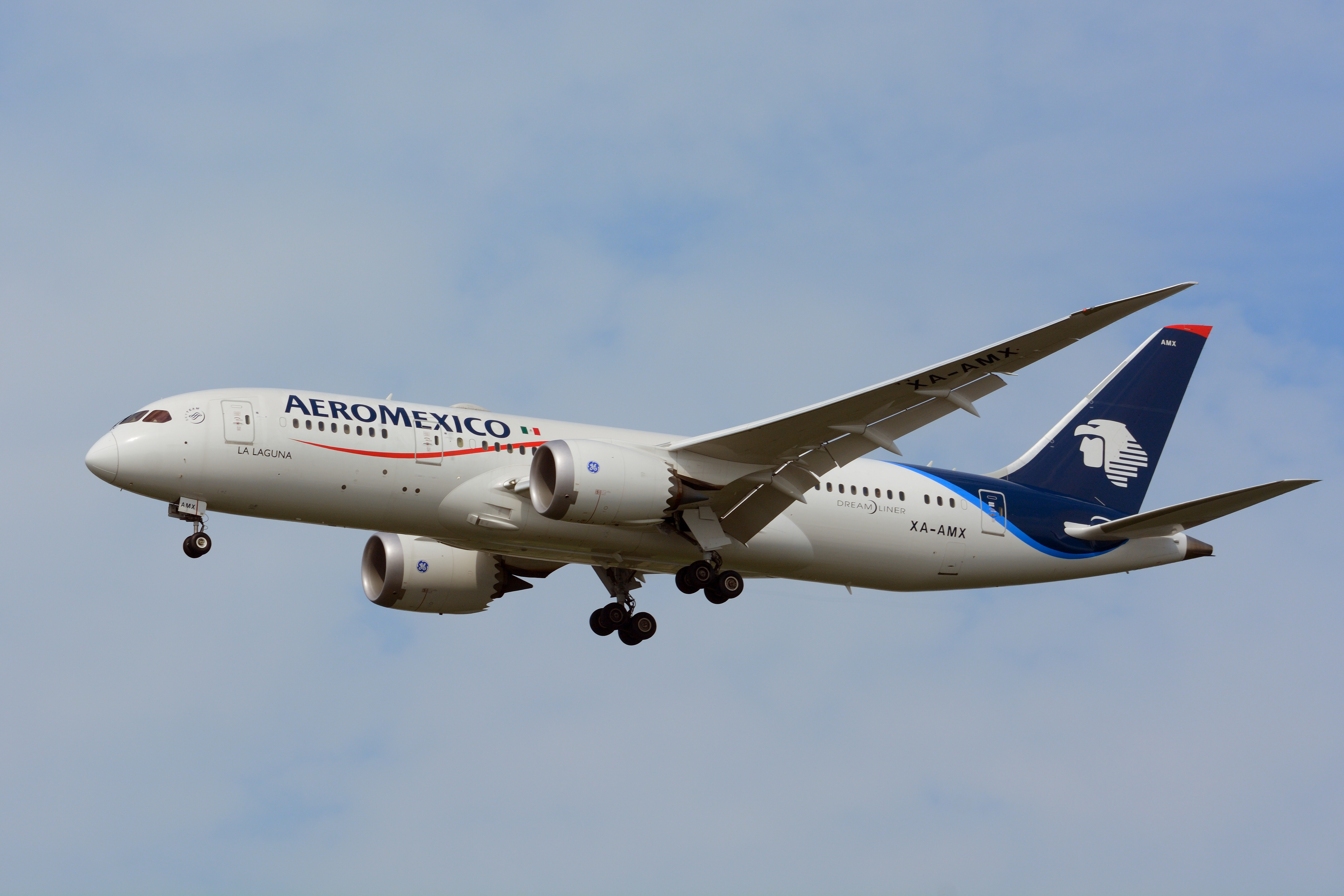
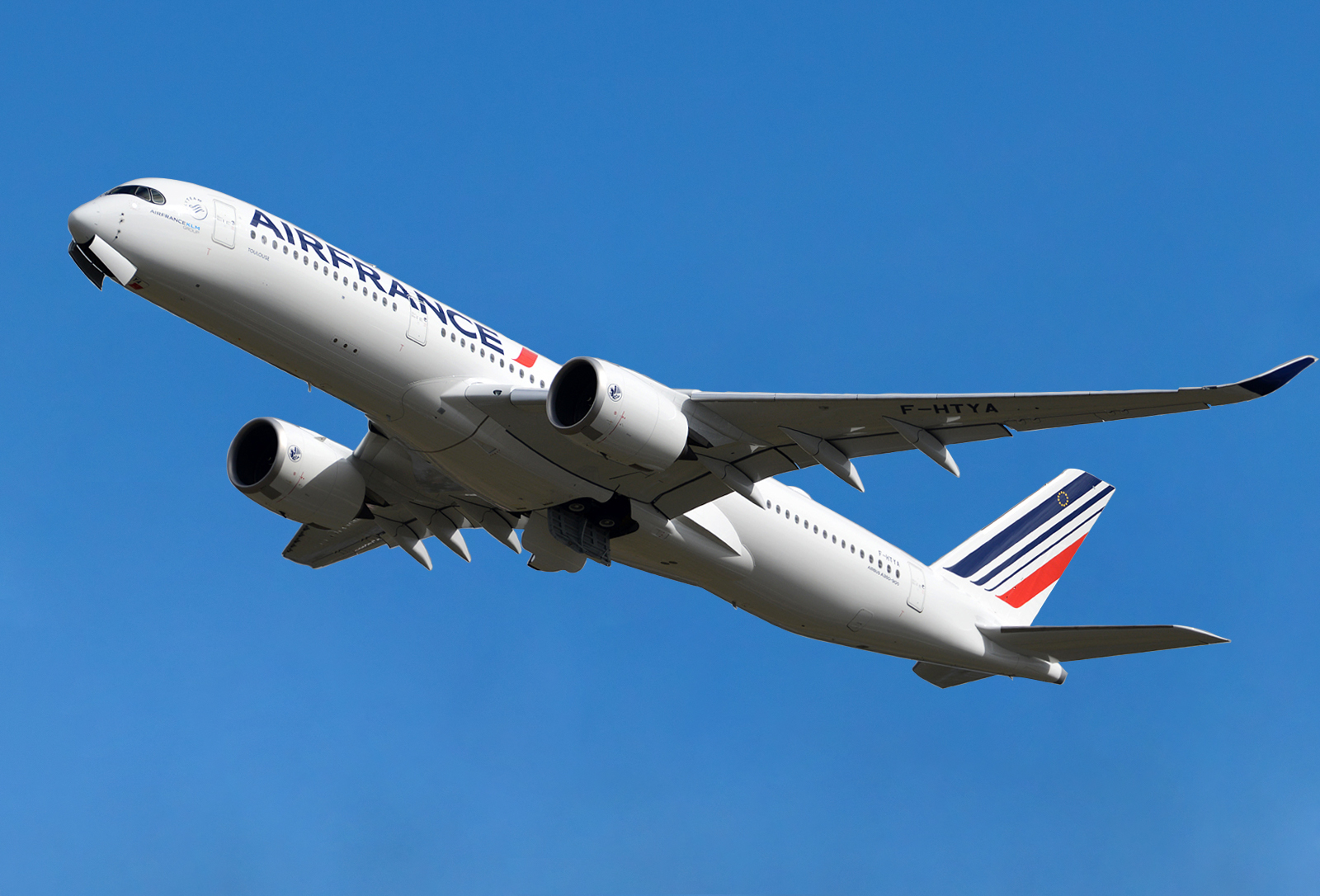
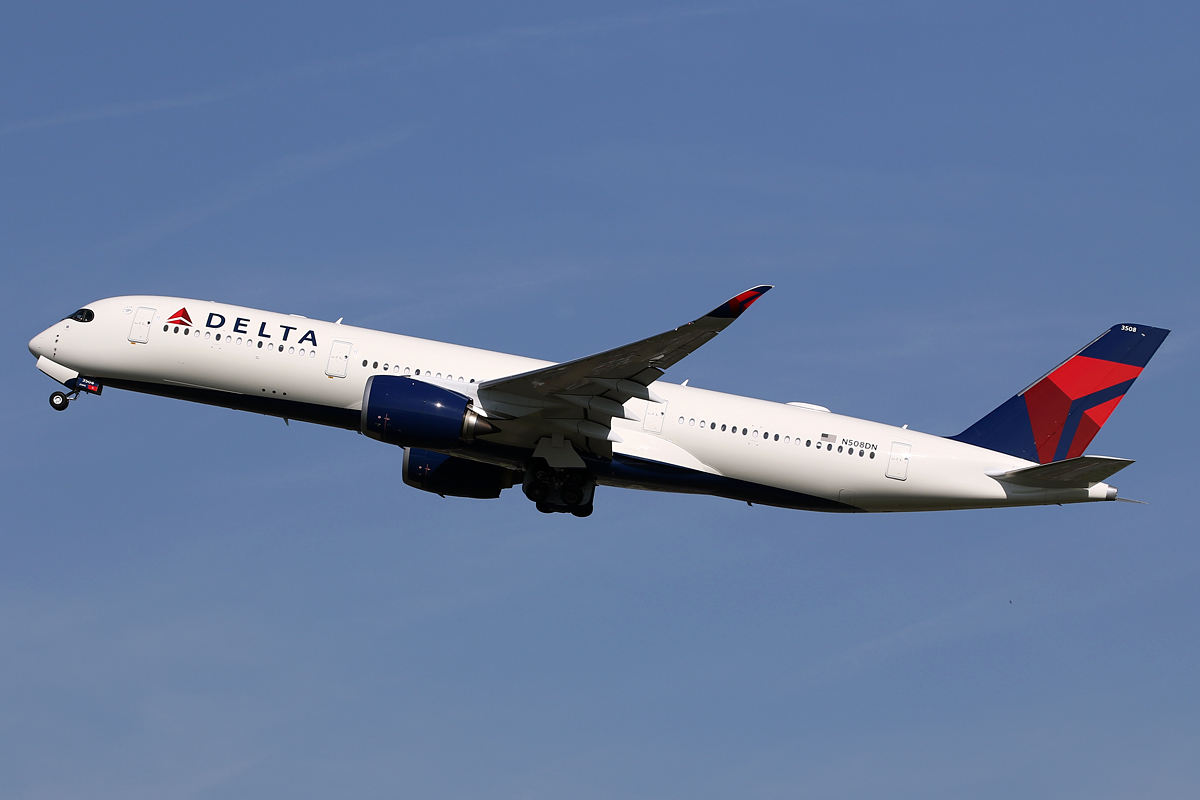
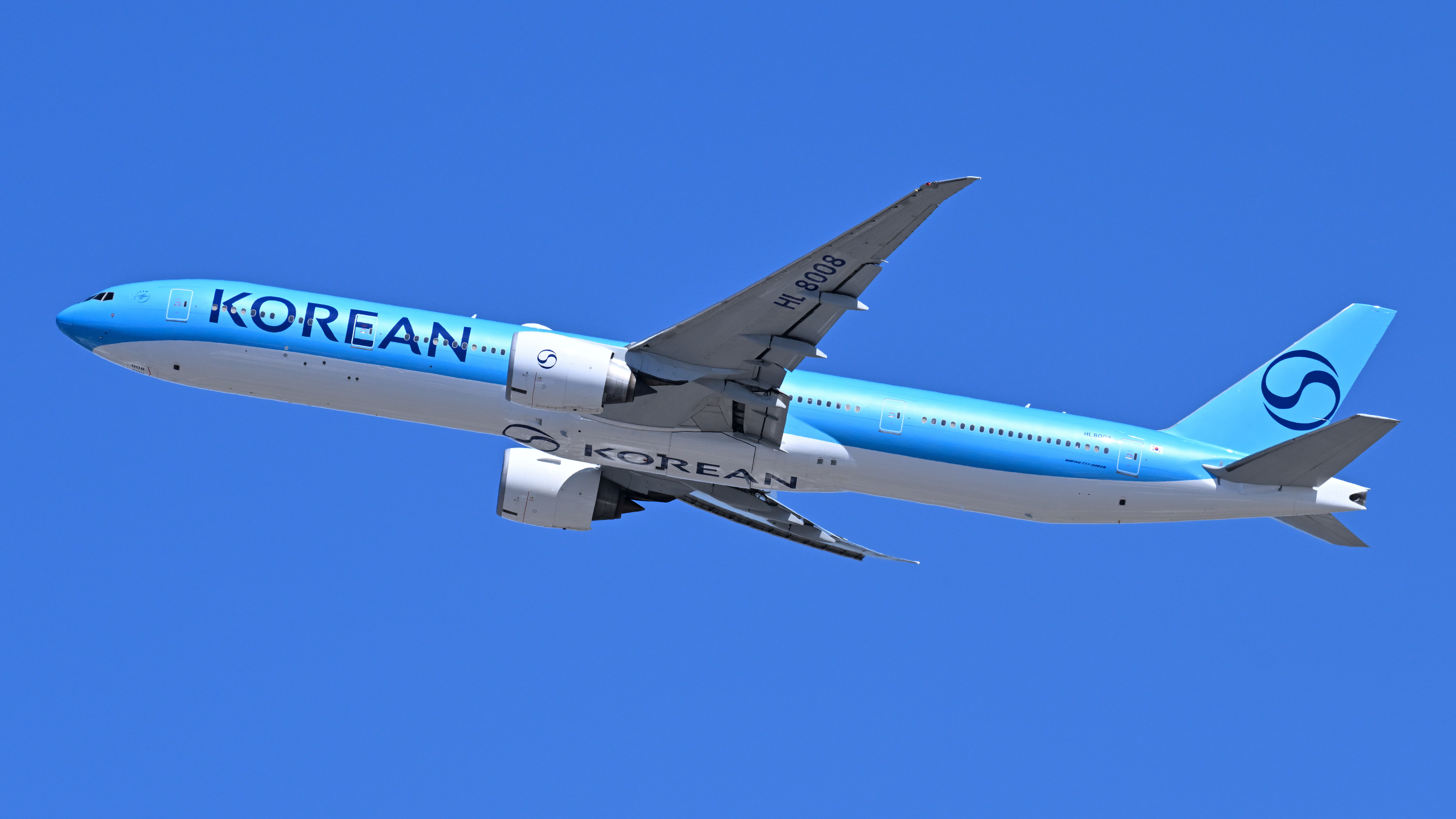
Aeroméxico, Air France, Delta Air Lines, and Korean Air are the four founding members of the alliance.

As of May 2025, the following airlines are members of SkyTeam:

Member airline	Joined	Member affiliates
(Argentina) Aerolíneas Argentinas	29 August 2012	
(Mexico) Aeroméxico^{[A]}	22 June 2000	(Mexico) Aeroméxico Connect
(Spain) Air Europa	4 September 2007	(Spain) Air Europa Express
Air France^{[A]}^{[B]}	22 June 2000	Air France Hop
(Taiwan) China Airlines	28 September 2011	
China Eastern Airlines	21 June 2011	(China) Shanghai Airlines
(United States) Delta Air Lines^{[A]}	22 June 2000	(United States) Delta Connection^{[C]}
Garuda Indonesia	5 March 2014	
Kenya Airways	4 September 2007	
(Netherlands) KLM^{[B]}	13 September 2004	(Netherlands) KLM Cityhopper
(South Korea) Korean Air^{[A]}	22 June 2000	
(Lebanon) Middle East Airlines	28 June 2012	
(Saudi Arabia) Saudia	29 May 2012	
(Denmark) (Norway) (Sweden) Scandinavian Airlines	1 September 2024	(Republic of Ireland) SAS Connect (Sweden) SAS Link
(Romania) TAROM	25 June 2010	
Vietnam Airlines	10 June 2010	
(United Kingdom) Virgin Atlantic	2 March 2023	
(China) XiamenAir	21 November 2012	

^{A}Founding member.
^{B}Air France and KLM Royal Dutch Airlines are part of the airline holding company Air France–KLM.
^{C}Delta Connection flights are operated by Endeavor Air, Republic Airways, and SkyWest Airlines.

=== Suspended members and member affiliates ===
Suspended member airline	Joined	Suspended	Member affiliates	Remarks
(Russia) Aeroflot	14 April 2006	28 April 2022		Due to Russian Invasion of Ukraine

=== Former members and member affiliates ===
==== Former member airlines and their affiliates ====
Former member airline	Joined	Exited	Member affiliates	Remarks
(Italy) Alitalia	27 July 2001	15 October 2021	(Italy) Alitalia CityLiner	Operations taken over by ITA Airways on 15 October 2021.
China Southern Airlines	15 November 2007	31 December 2018		
(United States) Continental Airlines	13 September 2004	24 October 2009		Joined Star Alliance on 27 October 2009.
(Czech Republic) Czech Airlines	25 March 2001	26 October 2024		Ceased operations as an airline.
(Italy) ITA Airways	29 October 2021	30 April 2025		Left after a 41% acquisition by Lufthansa Group, joined Star Alliance in 2026.
(United States) Northwest Airlines	13 September 2004	31 January 2010		Merged with Delta Air Lines on 31 January 2010.

==== Former affiliate members of current full members ====
Former member affiliate	Joined	Exited	Member affiliate of
(Mexico) Aerolitoral (Note: A founding affiliate member; was relaunched as Aeroméxico Connect.)	2000	2007	Aeroméxico
(Mexico) Aeroméxico Travel (Note: A former charter division, whose operations became part of Aeroméxico.)	2008	2011	Aeroméxico
(Argentina) Austral Líneas Aéreas	2012	2020	Aerolíneas Argentinas
(France) Brit Air	2000	2013	Air France
(United States) Comair	2000	2012	Delta Air Lines
(United States) Delta Express (Note: A founding affiliate member; replaced by Song Airlines.)	2000	2003	Delta Air Lines
(France) Régional	2001	2013	Air France
(United States) Song Airlines (Note: Song's operations were re-absorbed into Delta's fleet, upon Song ceasing operations in 2006.)	2003	2006	Delta Air Lines

==== Former associate members ====
Former associate member	Joined	Exited	Member affiliates
(Panama) Copa Airlines	4 September 2007	24 October 2009 (Note: Joined Star Alliance in mid-2012.)	

== SkyTeam Cargo ==
SkyTeam Cargo is the cargo division of SkyTeam. As of May 2025, the cargo alliance comprised seven members from the passenger alliance: Aerolíneas Argentinas Cargo, Aeroméxico Cargo, Air France-KLM Cargo (include Air France Cargo and KLM Cargo), China Cargo Airlines, Delta Cargo, Korean Air Cargo, and Saudia Cargo.

Aerolíneas Argentinas Cargo joined the alliance in November 2013. Saudia Cargo joined the alliance on 15 April 2019.

== Livery and logo ==
SkyTeam launched a special livery in 2009, coinciding with the alliance's 10th anniversary, with Delta Air Lines being the first airline to paint one of its aircraft with these colours. The livery consisted of an all-metallic silver fuselage and a dark blue empennage with SkyTeam's logo on it. The alliance emblem is painted on both sides of the fuselage. As of August 2016, the SkyTeam livery was worn by 52 aircraft.
