= Air Europa Express =

Regional airline of Spain

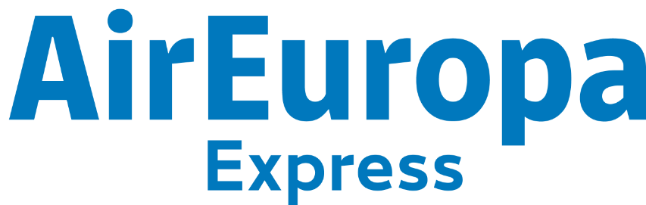

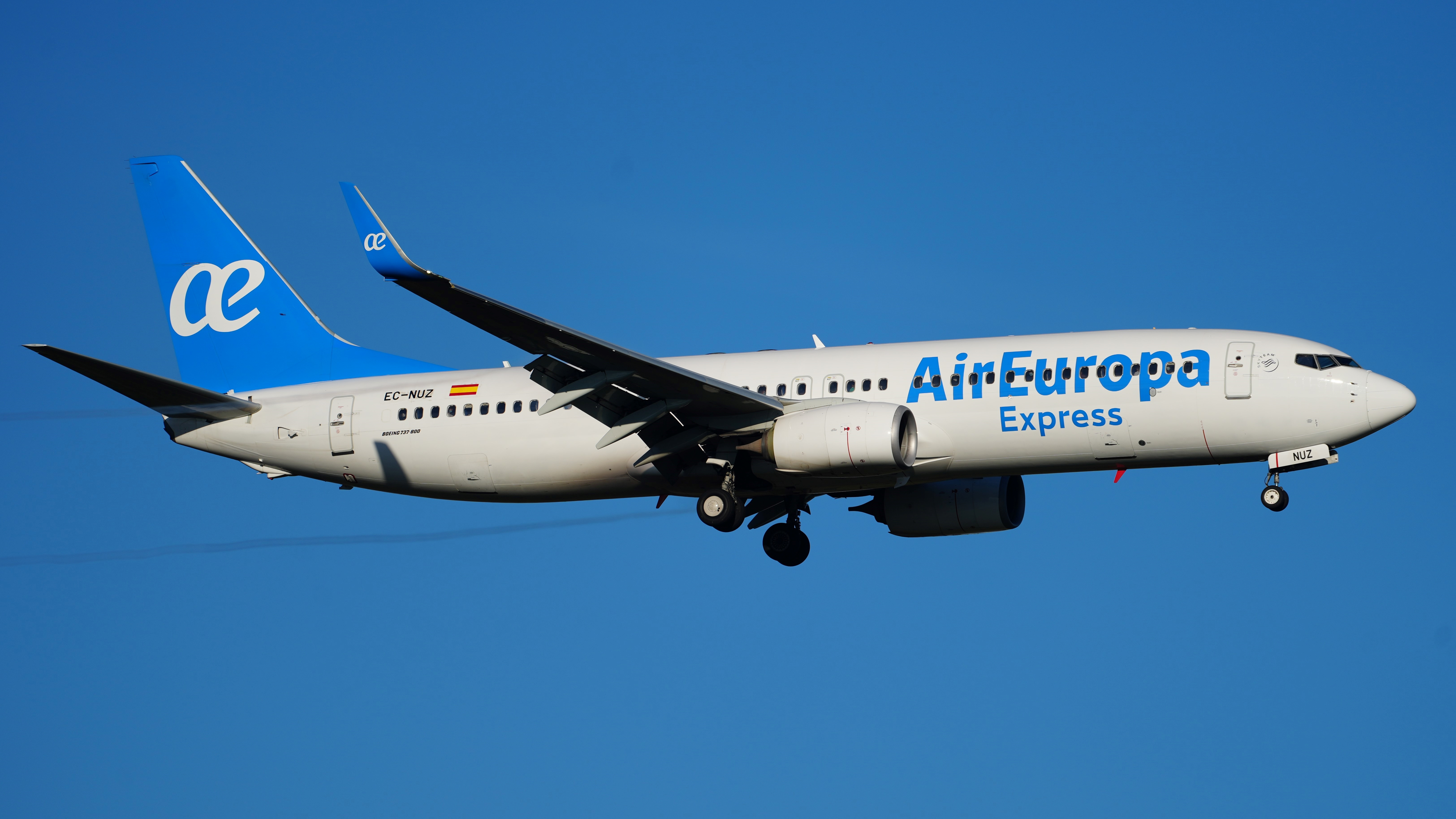
- Air Europa Express Boeing 737-800 at Frankfurt Airport
| IATA | ICAO | Call sign |
|---|---|---|
| X5 | OVA | AERONOVA |
- Founded: 1996; 30 years ago (as Aeronova)
- AOC #: ES.AOC.020
- Hubs: Madrid; Palma de Mallorca
- Frequent-flyer program: Suma
- Alliance: SkyTeam (affiliate)
- Fleet size: 10
- Parent company: Air Europa
- Headquarters: Son Sant Joan, Mallorca, Spain

Air Europa Express (legally incorporated as Aeronova, S.L.U. and previously doing business as Aeronova) is a Spanish regional low-cost airline. It is a subsidiary of Globalia (which is also the parent company of Air Europa). The airline is set to operate regional routes for Air Europa.

== History ==
The airline was founded in Spain in 1996 as Aeronova and flew scheduled and charter flights on behalf of other companies. Aeronova also had a school offering training for pilots on the two types the airline flew, the ATR 42 and the Fairchild Metroliner.

In November 2015, Globalia Corporacion, parent company of Air Europa, bought Aeronova. Later the same month, it was announced that Globalia would rebrand the company as Air Europa Express to operate Air Europa's regional flights.

The new Air Europa Express is Globalia's third attempt at creating a regional subsidiary. The first was another airline with the same name which collapsed in 2001; a second airline, known as Universal Airlines, never commenced operations.

The airline commenced operations as Air Europa Express on 11 January 2016 with two daily flights between Valencia and Madrid; and one daily flight between Valencia and Palma de Mallorca; operating under the Aeronova air operator's certificate (AOC). It was expected to get a new AOC in March 2016 to fully change the name from Aeronova to Air Europa Express. This change has not occurred yet, as the company still operates under the Aeronova legal name and AOC. Tickets for flights are only available for purchase from the Air Europa website.

As of 2016, Globalia planned to have Air Europa grow and operate long-haul flights, and have Air Europa Express for short-haul and regional routes to be more competitive and reduce costs. The airline is not a part of Air Europa and therefore the staff of the airline would be totally independent of Air Europa.

== Fleet ==
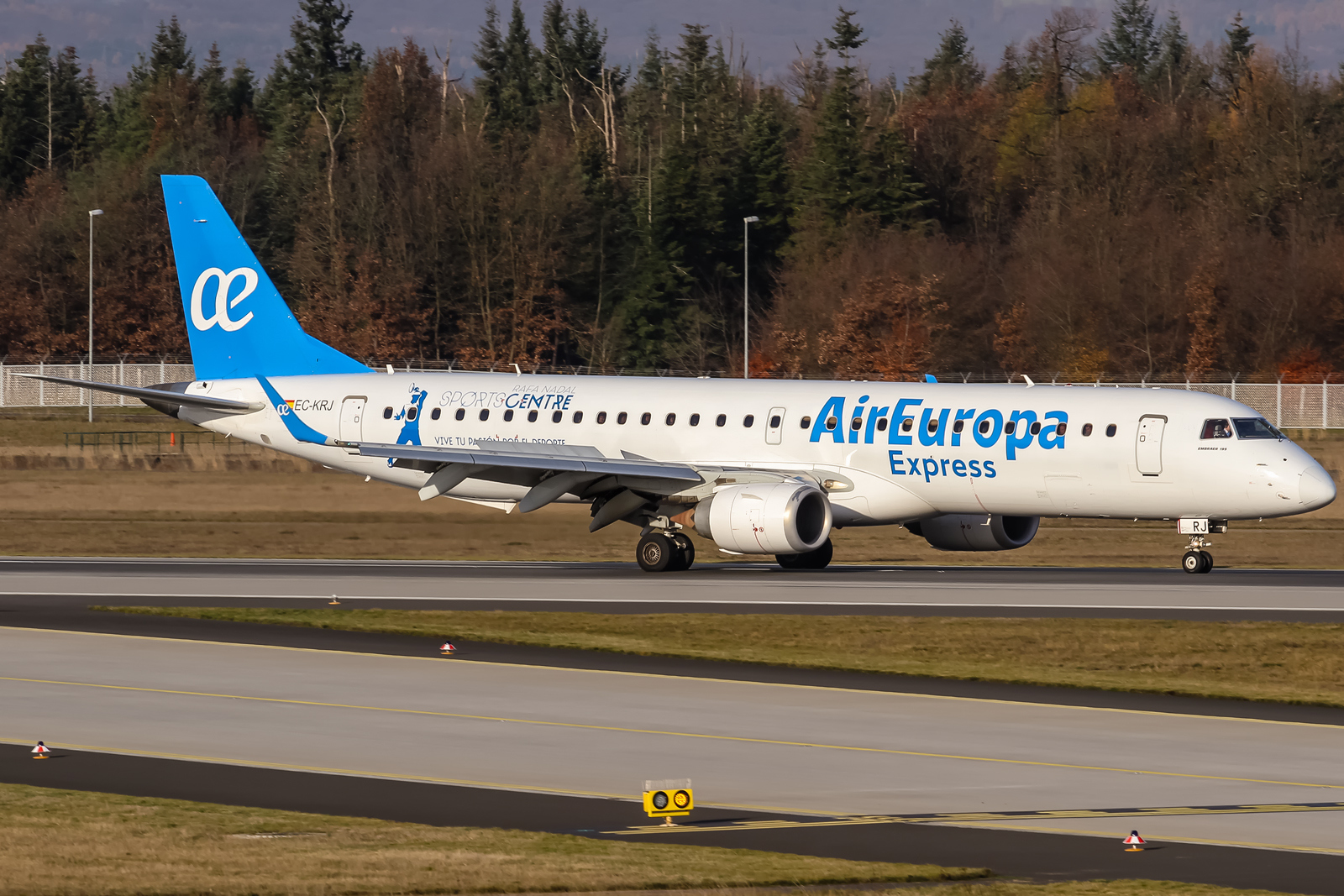
Air Europa Express former Embraer 195 at Frankfurt Airport

=== Current fleet ===
As of September 2025, Air Europa Express operates an all-Boeing 737 fleet composed of the following aircraft:

Air Europa Express fleet
| Aircraft | In service | Orders | Passengers | Notes |
|---|---|---|---|---|
| Boeing 737-800 | 10 | — | 186 | |
| Total | 10 | — | | |

=== Former fleet ===
As of September 2025, Air Europa Express has retired the following aircraft opting to retain only Boeing 737-800 aircraft:

Air Europa Express retired fleet
| Aircraft | Retired | Orders | Passengers | Notes |
|---|---|---|---|---|
| ATR 42-300 | 2 | — | 50 | |
| ATR 72-500 | 16 | — | 68 | |
| Embraer 195 | 11 | — | 120 | |
| Total | 29 | — | | |
