= Air Europa =

Spanish airline based in Majorca

Coordinates: 39°28′59″N 2°51′10″E

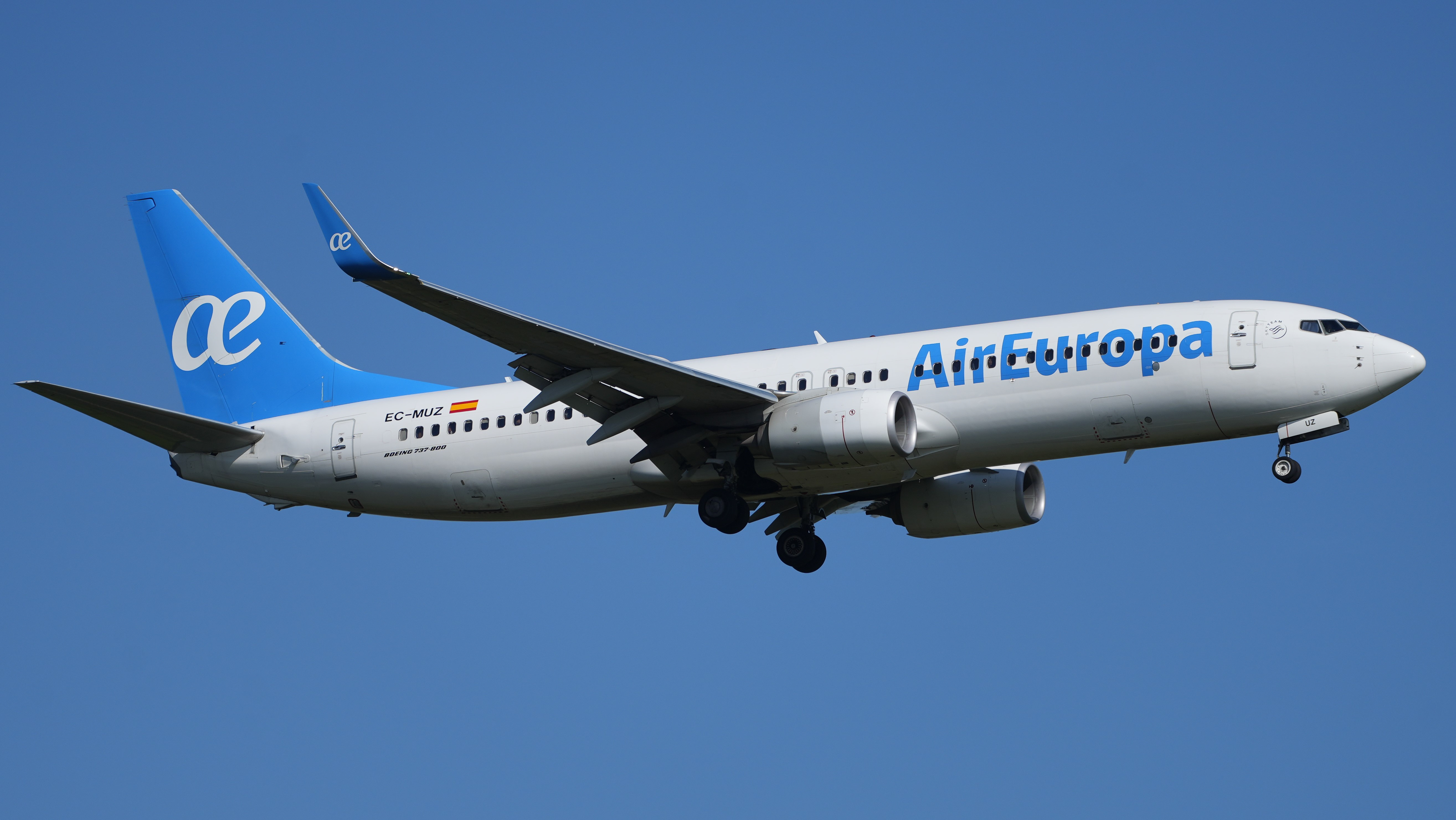
- An Air Europa Boeing 737-800
IATA	ICAO	Call sign
UX	AEA	EUROPA
- Founded: 1986; 40 years ago
- AOC #: ES.AOC.004
- Hubs: Adolfo Suárez Madrid–Barajas Airport
- Focus cities: Palma de Mallorca Airport; Tenerife North Airport
- Frequent-flyer program: Suma
- Alliance: SkyTeam
- Subsidiaries: Air Europa Express
- Fleet size: 45
- Destinations: 44
- Parent company: Globalia
- Headquarters: Llucmajor, Mallorca, Spain
- Key people: Juan José Hidalgo, Chairman and CEO
- Employees: 2,949 (5 March 2014)
- Website: aireuropa.com

Air Europa Líneas Aéreas, S.A.U., branded as Air Europa, is the third largest Spanish airline after Iberia and Vueling. The airline is headquartered in Llucmajor, Mallorca, Spain; it has its main hub at Adolfo Suárez Madrid–Barajas Airport with focus city operations at Palma de Mallorca Airport and Tenerife North Airport. Air Europa flies to over 44 destinations in Spain, the rest of Europe, South America, North America, the Caribbean, Morocco and Tunisia. Since September 2007, Air Europa has been a member of the SkyTeam alliance.

== History ==
=== Early years ===
Air Europa started in 1986 (registered in Spain as Air España SA and previously known as such) as part of the British ILG-Air Europe Group and 75% owned by Spanish banks. It originally had a similar livery to Air Europe but with Air Europa titles and its aircraft were registered in Spain. It flew holiday charters from Mediterranean resorts and European cities using Boeing 737-300s and Boeing 757s. It was the first Spanish private company to operate national scheduled flights (besides charter flights which used to be its main business).

When parent company ILG ceased trading in 1991 after a decrease in demand due to the Gulf War, Air Europa continued profitably with a larger fleet of Boeing 737s and 757s. It signed a franchise agreement with Iberia in January 1998, but this has since been dissolved. It is now owned by Globalia Corporación Empresarial S.A.

At the end of the 1990s, Boeing 737-800 jets were introduced along with a new livery. In June 2005, it was announced Air Europa was among four future associate members of the SkyTeam alliance, due to join by 2006. However, the joining date was postponed, and it did not become a member until 1 September 2007. Air Europa was the parent company for Air Dominicana, the new flag carrier of the Dominican Republic, until bankruptcy was declared for the Dominican Republic carrier on September 21, 2009.

=== Developments since 2010 ===
Air Europa retired its last Boeing 767 on April 13, 2012.

On May 22, 2019, the National Civil Aviation Agency of Brazil (ANAC) granted Air Europa permission to operate domestic flights in the country. This was the first time a foreign company was granted such authorisation, after Brazilian laws were changed to allow full foreign ownership of domestic airlines. As of June 2019, no details were available about Air Europa's future domestic operations in Brazil, a market which the airline already serves with international flights from Madrid to Salvador and Recife.

=== Proposed acquisition by International Airlines Group ===
On November 4, 2019, International Airlines Group (IAG) announced plans to acquire Air Europa from Globalia for €1 billion with the deal expected to close in the first half of 2020. At the time, Air Europa operated a fleet of 66 aircraft and had generated an operating profit of €100 million in 2018. IAG stated its intention to integrate Air Europa into Iberia while indefinitely retaining the brand. IAG expected to see an ROI by the fourth year with full synergy by 2025 including inter-group codeshares, bank timing adjustments at Madrid Airport, and sales and loyalty program alignment. In January 2021 amid the COVID-19 pandemic, the parties agreed to cut the transaction price in half to €500 million. Plans for a merger were scrapped in November 2021, with both parties seeking ways to revive it, with a deadline set for the end of January 2022. However, in August 2022, IAG converted a loan to Air Europa into a 20% shareholding.

In February 2023, IAG agreed to buy Air Europa for €400 million, with the brand to remain intact despite IAG's plans to make it part of Iberia. The decision followed interventions by the Spanish government, a key proponent of the merger. According to IAG, the merger would allow for the launch of Asia flights from the Madrid hub, which the Spanish government had advocated for. If the deal were to be approved by regulators, then once the merger would be complete, Air Europa was expected to exit SkyTeam and join other IAG members as part of Oneworld. In January 2024, the European Commission said the deal could reduce competition on domestic routes in Spain and short-haul routes from Madrid to other major cities in Europe and the Mediterranean. The EU competition enforcer also cited concerns over long-haul routes between Madrid and the Americas. In February 2024, Reuters reported that IAG was likely to be hit with an EU antitrust warning, suggesting that regulators found IAG's proposed remedies to be insufficient to alleviate competition concerns.

In August 2024, IAG announced that it would abandon the deal after deeming additional remedies to address EU antitrust conditions too onerous to make the deal viable. IAG said it would instead seek to grow its position in Madrid to develop it into a rival to Europe's major aviation hubs.

=== Developments since 2025 ===
In mid-2025, Air France–KLM, Lufthansa and Turkish Airlines approached Globalia to present bids for a stake in Air Europa; by August, both Air France–KLM and Lufthansa abandoned negotiations, leaving Turkish Airlines as the only known remaining bidder.

== Destinations ==
Air Europa operates tour services between northern and western Europe and holiday resorts in the Canary Islands and Balearic Islands. It also operates domestic scheduled services and long-haul scheduled services to North America and South America from Madrid. Its hub is Madrid–Barajas Airport.

In June 2026, Air Europa announced a new direct route between Madrid and El Salvador, set to launch on 17 December 2026, expanding Air Europa's existing Central American network which already includes direct services to Honduras and Panama.

=== Codeshare agreements ===
As of January 2025, Air Europa has codeshare agreements with the following airlines:

- Aerolíneas Argentinas
- Aeroméxico
- Air France
- Air Serbia
- Azul Brazilian Airlines
- Canaryfly
- China Airlines
- China Eastern Airlines
- Copa Airlines
- Delta Air Lines
- Etihad Airways
- Ethiopian Airlines
- Flair Airlines
- Garuda Indonesia
- Hainan Airlines
- ITA Airways
- KLM
- Kenya Airways
- Korean Air
- Kuwait Airways
- Middle East Airlines
- Saudia
- Smartwings
- Scandinavian Airlines
- TAROM
- Turkish Airlines
- Vietnam Airlines
- Virgin Atlantic
- XiamenAir

Air Europa also has interline agreements with Air Transat, Iberojet, My Freighter Airlines and Sky Airline.

== Fleet ==
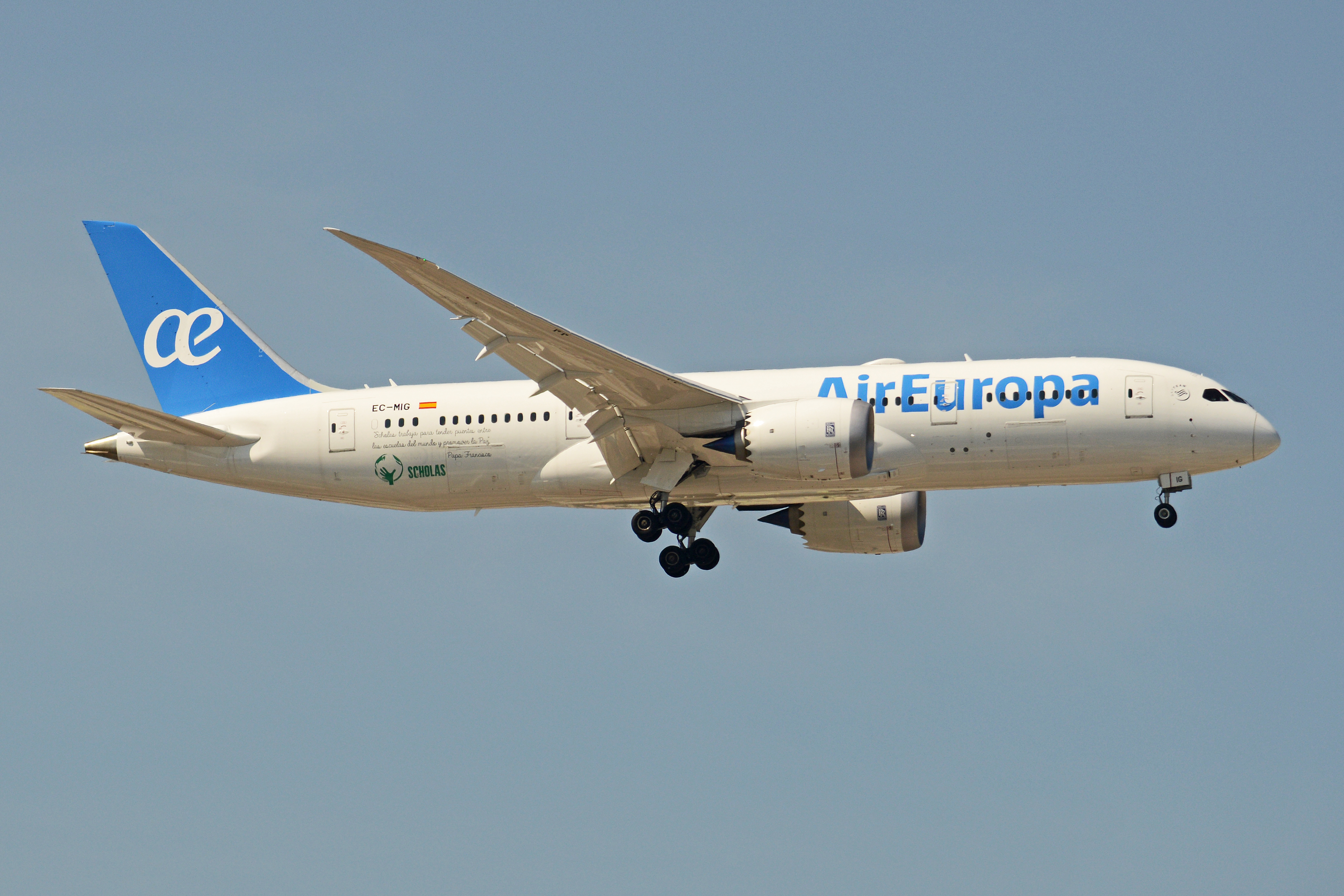
Air Europa Boeing 787-8

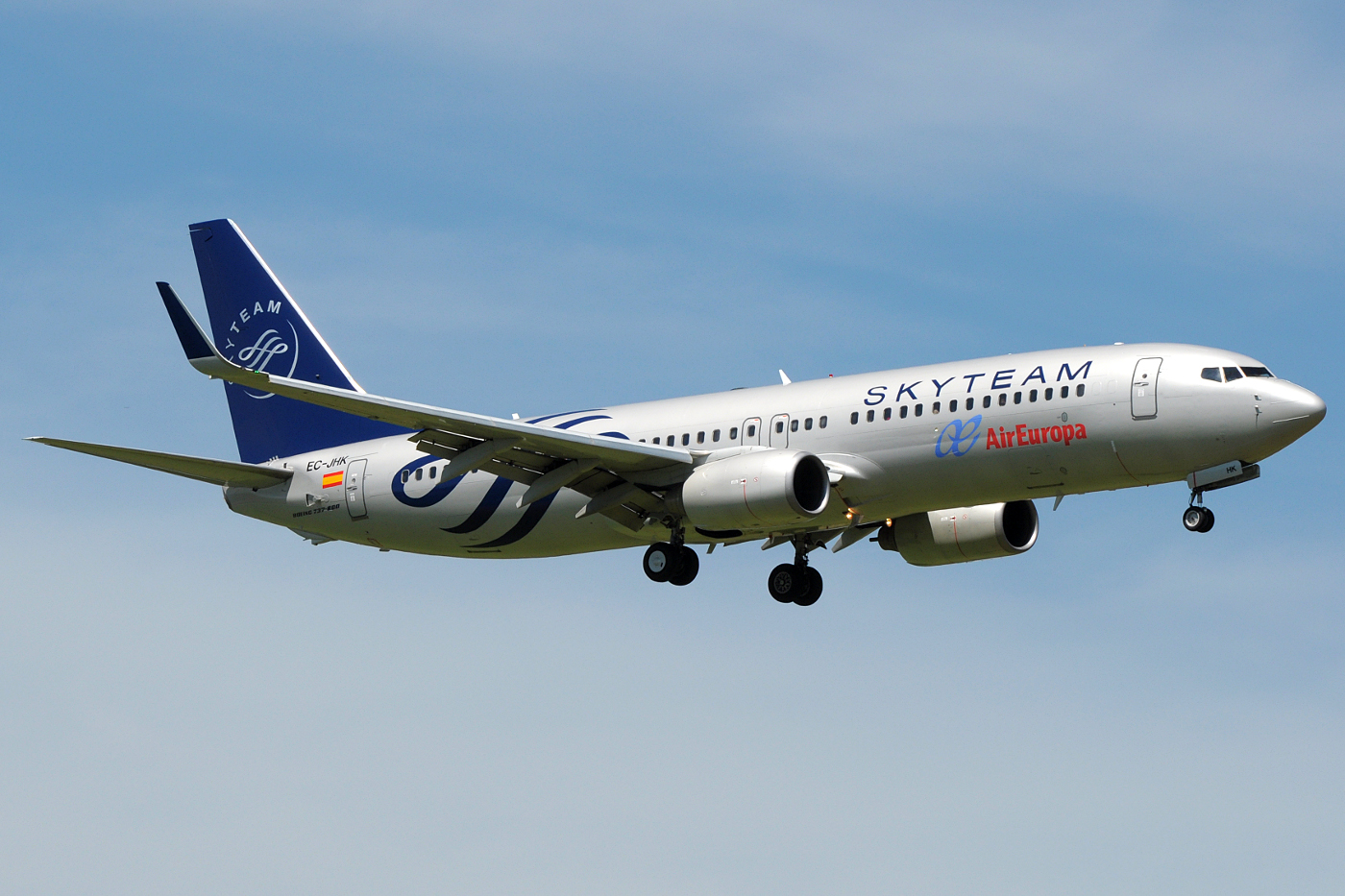
Air Europa Boeing 737-800 wearing the SkyTeam special livery

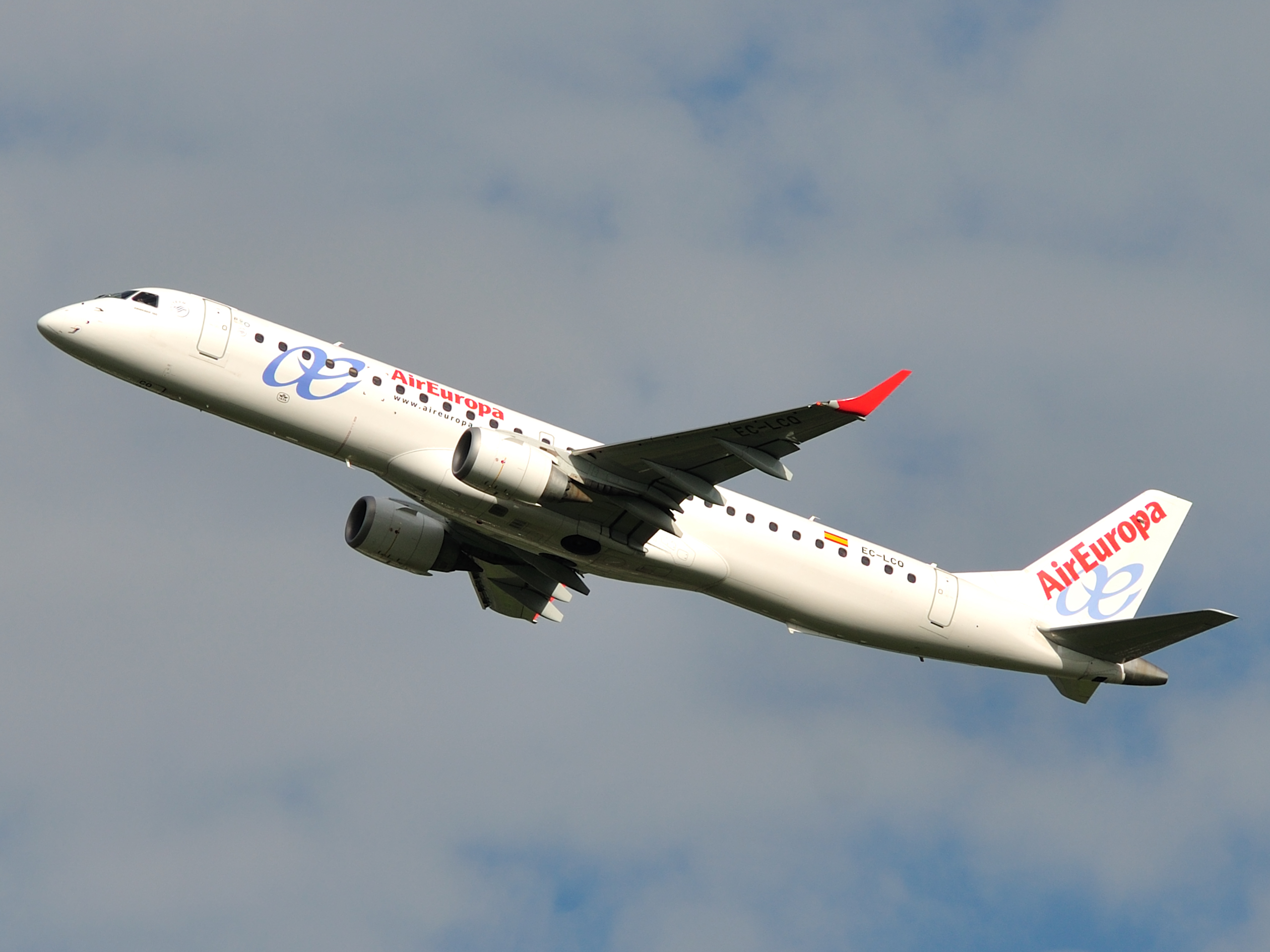
Air Europa Embraer E195 painted in the airline's former livery

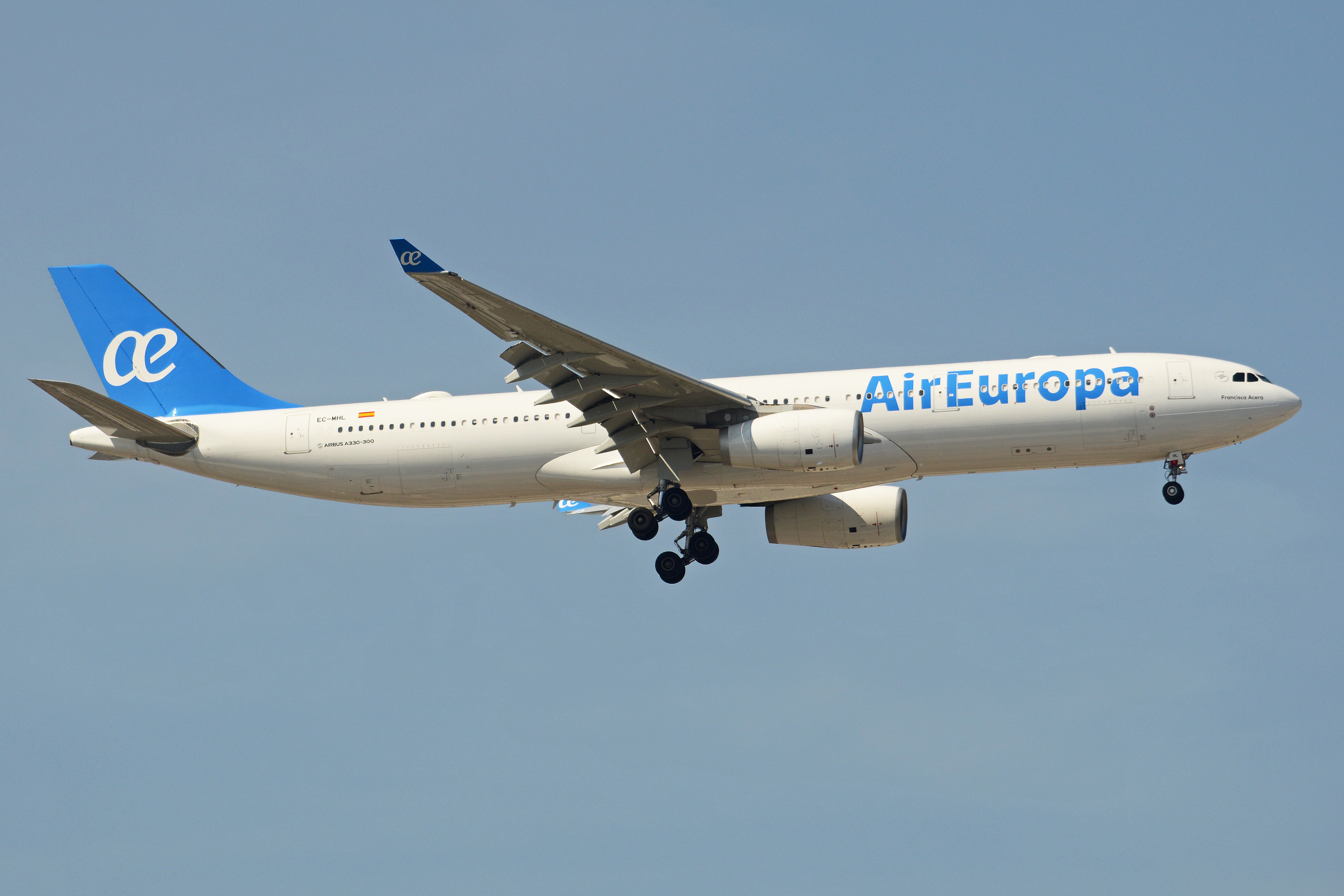
A former Air Europa Airbus A330-300

=== Current fleet ===
As of November 2025, Air Europa operates an all-Boeing fleet composed of the following aircraft:

Air Europa fleet
Aircraft	In service	Orders	Passengers			Notes
Aircraft	In service	Orders	J	Y	Total	Notes
Airbus A350-900	—	40	TBA			
Boeing 737-800	14	—	—	186	186	
Boeing 737 MAX 8	4	16	—	189	189	Deliveries from May 2025.
Boeing 787-8	11	—	22	274	296	
Boeing 787-9	18	—	32	307	339	
Total	47	56				

=== Former fleet ===
Air Europa previously operated the following aircraft:

- Airbus A330-200
- Airbus A330-300

== Accidents and incidents ==
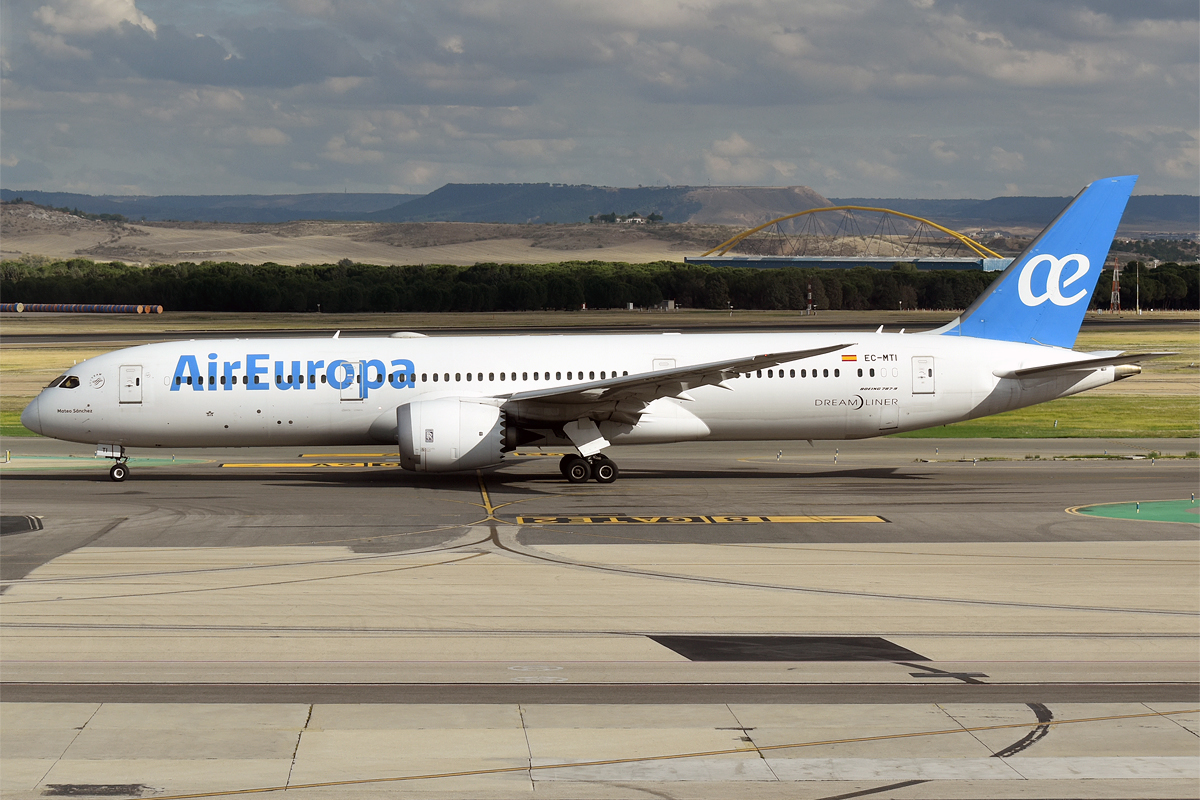
EC-MTI, the aircraft involved in the Flight 045 incident, photographed in November 2022

As of January 2025, Air Europa has suffered one non-fatal incident:

- On July 1, 2024, Air Europa Flight 045, operated by a Boeing 787-9 Dreamliner that was registered EC-MTI, was a scheduled flight operating from Madrid–Barajas Airport, in Madrid, Spain, to Carrasco International Airport, in Montevideo, Uruguay. While over the Atlantic Ocean, the flight encountered severe turbulence at FL360, and at 04:50 UTC. The aircraft diverted to Greater Natal International Airport, in Natal, Brazil, where it landed safely at 05:32 UTC. Of the 336 people on board, 40 occupants received non-fatal injuries, which resulted in hospitalizations. Additionally, the aircraft interior sustained serious damage that required repairs. Four of the injuries, which were sustained by three passengers and one crew member, were serious.

== See also ==
- Air Europe (1979–1991)
- Air Europe (Italy) (1989–2008)
- List of airlines of Spain
- Transport in Spain
