= Gestair =

Spanish business jet operator

IATA	ICAO	Call sign
G5	GES // GSM	GESTAIR // GESTAIR AVIATION MALTA
- Commenced operations: 1977
- Operating bases: Madrid Barajas; Barcelona Airport; London City Airport; Malta Airport; Caen Airport; Zurich Airport; Valencia Airport; Palma de Mallorca Airport; Santiago de Compostela Airport
- Fleet size: Fleet below
- Headquarters: Madrid, Spain Barcelona, Spain Málaga, Spain Valletta, Malta
- Website: www.gestair.com

Gestair (Spanish: Grupo Gestair) is an aeronautical group based in Madrid, Spain, and Valletta, Malta. Created in 1977, it specialises in business jet charter, maintenance and support services.

== History ==
Gestair was founded in 1977 in Madrid. It specialized in offering private jets for short lease from key airports in Spain and with the years it expanded its operations to include six hubs spread across the country. The aircraft of Gestair's Business fleet section are categorized into four types: ultra long range, long range, medium-range and short range.

Along over three decades of operation the activities and services of Gestair group expanded to include charter airline services — through Audeli Air—, air taxi, flight training (in 2013 bought by G Air Group), handling, consulting, as well as maintenance and overhaul of aircraft. The maintenance and overhaul unit, initially named Corjet Maintenance, was later renamed Gestair Maintenance.

=== Cygnus Air ===
In 1994 Gestair founded 'Regional Líneas Aéreas' together with Regional Airlines (France). The airline operated scheduled passenger flights from Madrid with a fleet of Saab 340.

In January 1998 Regional was renamed Cygnus Air and by November the airline shifted to full cargo operations. Its fleet consisted then of two Douglas DC-862F aircraft. In July 2002, a DC8-73F was phased in. At that time the airline was owned 60% by Macholfam International, a branch of the Gestair group, and 40% by Imesapi of the ACS group. In May 2007, as part of a new policy of the Gestair Group, the name of the airline was changed to Gestair Cargo. At that time its main customer was Iberia Airlines.

Gestair Cargo expanded and modernized its fleet in 2011 adding two Boeing 767-300F. and by March 2010, following a capital increase, 73% of the company belonged to Imesapi and 27% to the Gestair group. In mid 2013 Gestair sold its cargo section to the founder of the Dutch Antilles Express airline, US businessman Arnold Leonora.

Gestair Cargo has been rebranded as Cygnus Air.

== Fleet (Gestair Business fleet section) ==
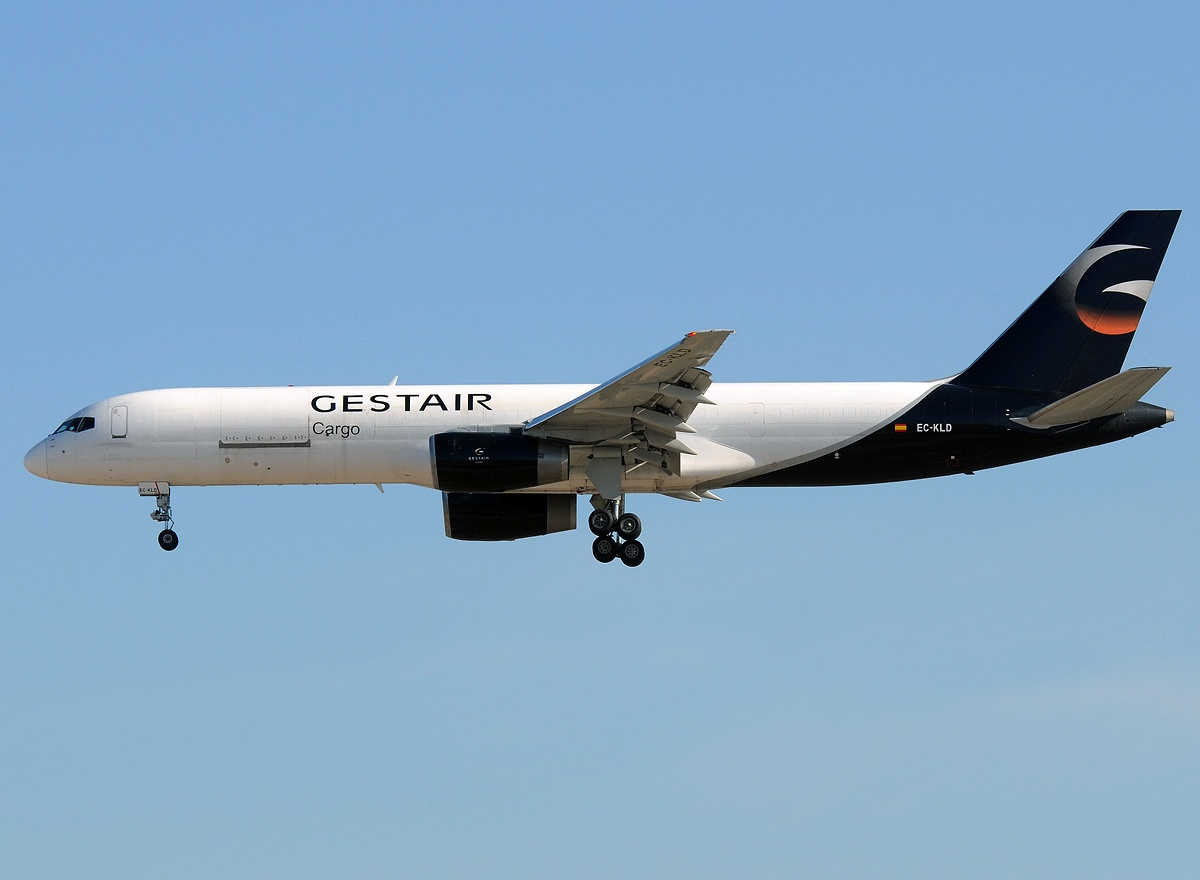
A Gestair Cargo Boeing 757

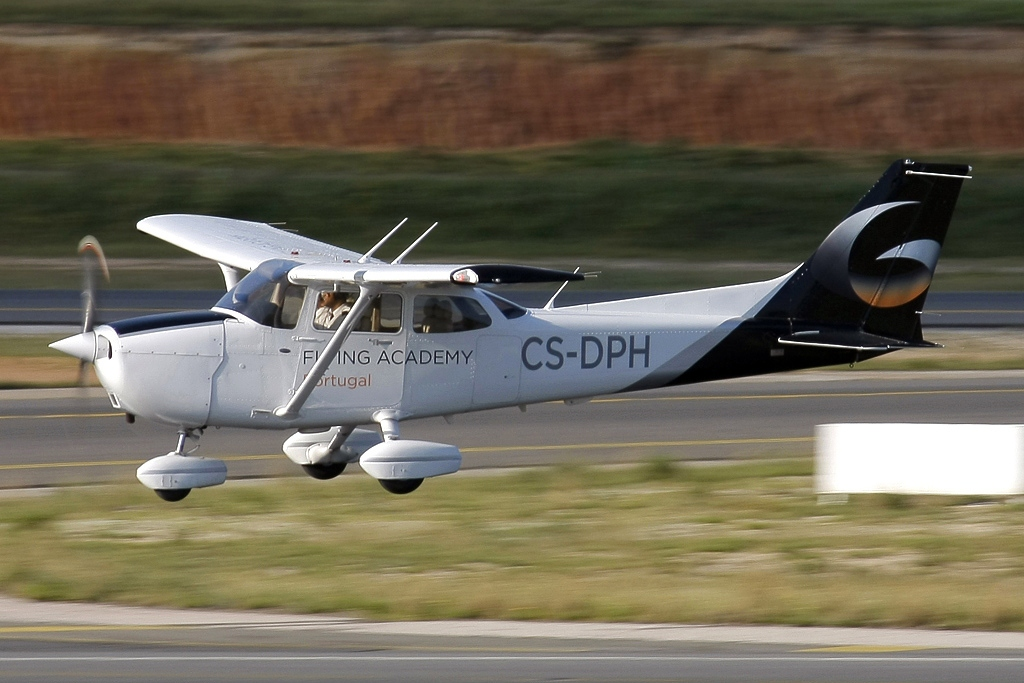
Gestair Flying Academy Cessna 172 Skyhawk

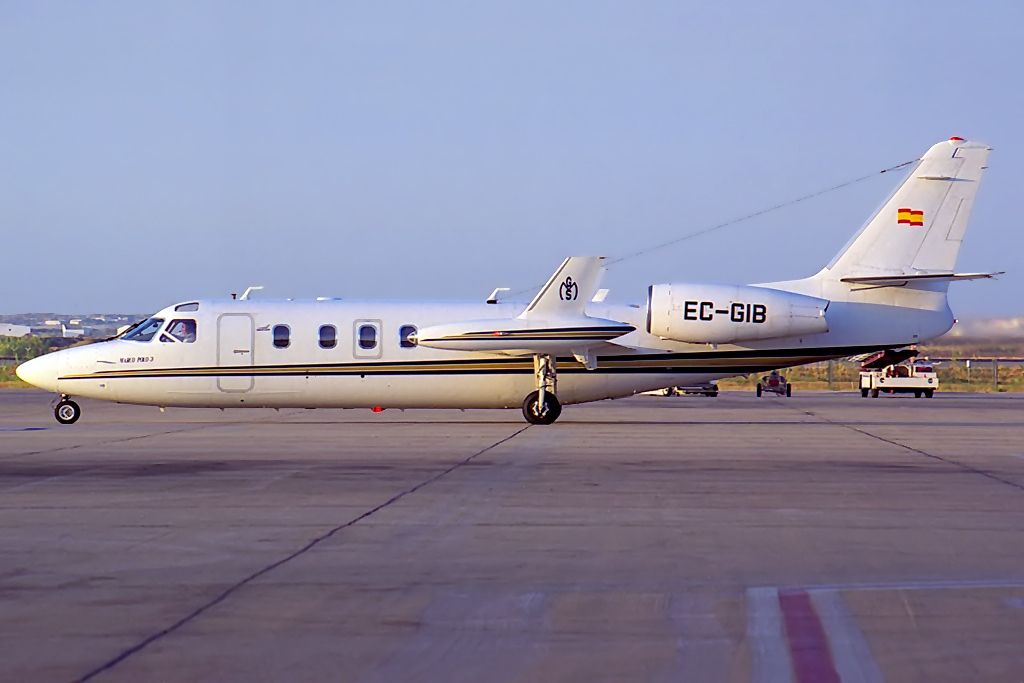
Gestair IAI Westwind

Gestair used different aircraft along its history. In 2023 it operated the following aircraft in its business jets fleet:

Gestair fleet
Aircraft	Type
Gulfstream G650	ULR
Gulfstream G550	ULR
Bombardier Global 6500	ULR
Bombardier Global 6000	ULR
Bombardier Global Express	ULR
Dassault Falcon 7X	LR
Embraer Legacy 650	LR
Gulfstream G200	LR
Dassault Falcon 2000	MR
Cessna Citation Sovereign	MR
Cessna Citation XLS+	MR
Cessna Citation Excel	MR
Pilatus PC24	SR

Note: ULR=Ultra Long Range, LR=Long Range, MR=Medium Range, SR=Short Range

== See also ==
- Audeli Air
- Cygnus Air
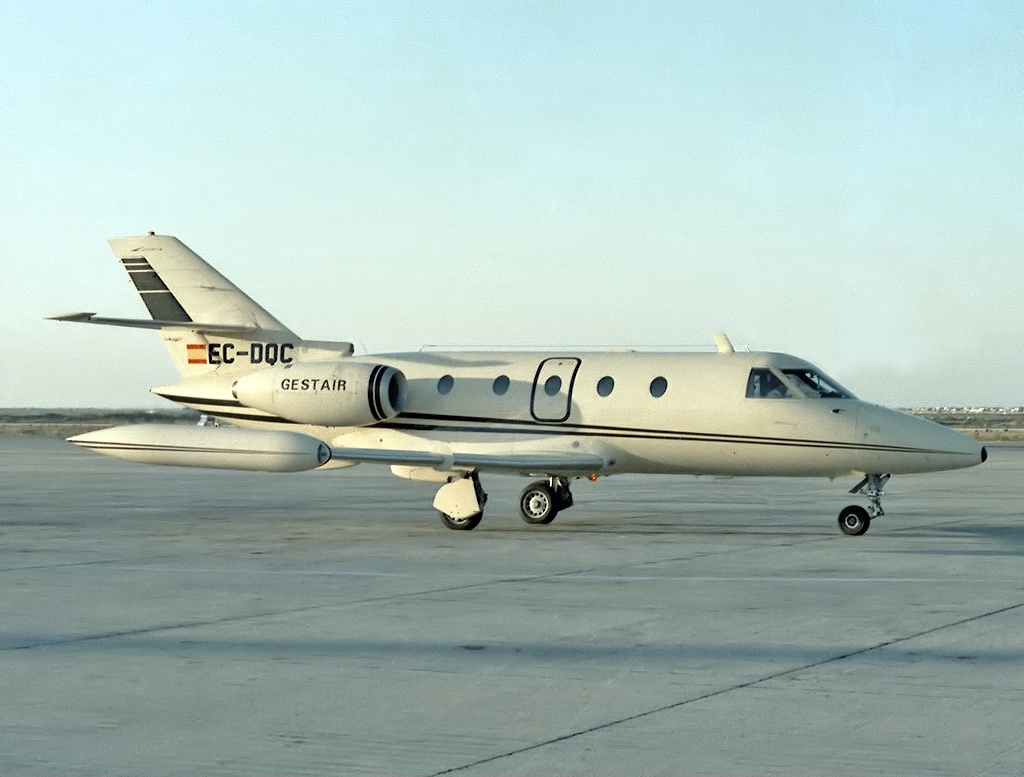
- Aerospatiale SN-601 Corvette 100
  Sky Service Aviation
