= Cygnus Air =

Spanish cargo airline

IATA	ICAO	Call sign
—	RGN	CYGNUS AIR
- Founded: 1994; 32 years ago
- Operating bases: Adolfo Suárez Madrid–Barajas Airport
- Fleet size: 5
- Destinations: Charter
- Parent company: IMES (Grupo ACS) (100%)
- Headquarters: Madrid, Spain
- Website: gestair.com

Cygnus Air (Corporación Ygnus Air) is a cargo airline based in Madrid, Spain. It is a privately owned airline operating scheduled flights to destinations mainly in Europe. Its main base is Madrid Barajas International Airport. Founded in 1994 as Regional Líneas Aéreas, it has undergone a number of name changes along its history.

== History ==
=== Foundation and early years ===
The airline was founded by Regional Airlines (France) together with the Spanish Gestair group as 'Regional Líneas Aéreas' in 1994. The airline operated scheduled passenger flights from Madrid with a fleet of Saab 340s.

In January 1998 Regional was renamed Cygnus Air and by November the airline shifted to full cargo operations. Its fleet consisted then of two Douglas DC-862F aircraft. In July 2002, a DC8-73F was phased in. At that time the airline was owned 60% by Macholfam International, a branch of the Gestair group, and 40% by Imesapi of the ACS group.

=== Further rebrandings ===
In May 2007, as part of a new policy of the Gestair Group, the airline began to use Gestair Cargo as DBA. At that time Gestair Cargo's main customer was Iberia Airlines. Gestair Cargo expanded and modernized its fleet in 2011, adding a Boeing 767-300F in January and another Boeing 767-300F in March. By March 2010, following a capital increase, 73% of the company belonged to Imesapi and 27% to the Gestair Group.

Cygnus Air belongs to ACS group. The airline operates regular cargo flights within Europe and Canary Islands with its B757. Cygnus Air also offers to its clients charter flights and ad-hoc solutions.

== Fleet ==
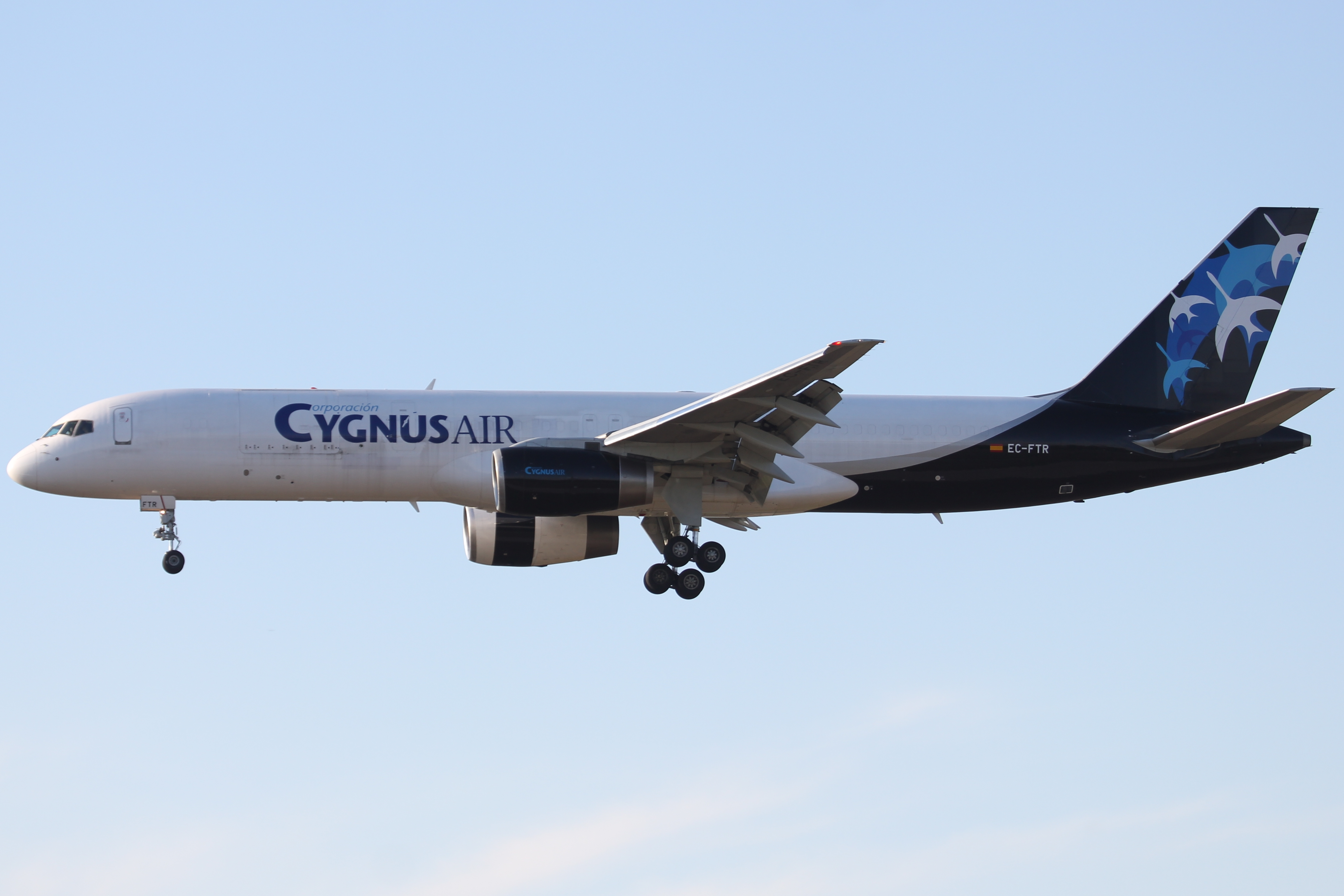
Cygnus Air Boeing 757-200PCF

As of August 2025, Cygnus Air operates the following aircraft:

Cygnus Air fleet
Aircraft	Number	Ordners	Notes
Boeing 757-200PCF	5	—	
Total	5	—	
