= List of de Havilland Comet operators =

The following is a list of civil and military operators of the de Havilland Comet since its introduction in 1952.

== Civilian ==
=== Argentina ===
- Aerolíneas Argentinas ordered six Comet 4s in 1958 and they were delivered in 1959 and 1960, with a service introduction on 16 April 1959, between Buenos Aires and Santiago, Chile. Due to the loss of three aircraft, a replacement Comet 4C was bought in 1962. After being moved from international flights to domestic flights from 1966, the survivors were retired and sold to Dan-Air in 1971.

=== Australia ===
- Qantas Empire Airways leased seven different Comet 4 aircraft in the early 1960s mainly to operate the Sydney to Singapore route.

=== Canada ===
- Canadian Pacific Airlines ultimately had none in operation. One Comet 1A aircraft crashed on delivery and another was cancelled.

=== Ceylon ===
- Air Ceylon chartered BOAC Comet 4s in the early 1960s to operate international services, they were not re-painted but carried Air Ceylon titles.

=== Federation of Rhodesia and Nyasaland (Central Africa Federation) ===
- Central African Airways operated weekly Salisbury to London services using wet leased BOAC Comets during the early 1960s

=== East African Community (Kenya, Uganda and Tanzania) ===
- East African Airways acquired three Comet 4s in 1960/62 and operated them on services to Europe for the next decade. They also chartered an additional Comet 4 from BOAC/Dan Air during 1965/66, and an additional three (consecutively) on short-term charters during 1970/71, by which time the Comets were being used for inter-African services.

=== Ghana ===
- Ghana Airways between 1961 and 1962 leased a Comet from BOAC, which was primarily used to operate the route between Accra and London.

=== Ecuador ===
- AREA Ecuador had one Comet 4 delivered in 1966 that was used on services between Quito and Miami. In 1968, the aircraft was impounded at Miami and remained under legal custody until scrapped in 1978.

=== Egypt ===
- Misrair had two new Comet 4C delivered in 1960. The airline became United Arab Airlines in 1960, which took delivery of seven more Comet 4Cs over the course of the 1960s. Upon the transformation of United Arab Airlines into EgyptAir in 1971, four of these aircraft were inherited by the new airline; they were all sold off over the course of the 1970s.

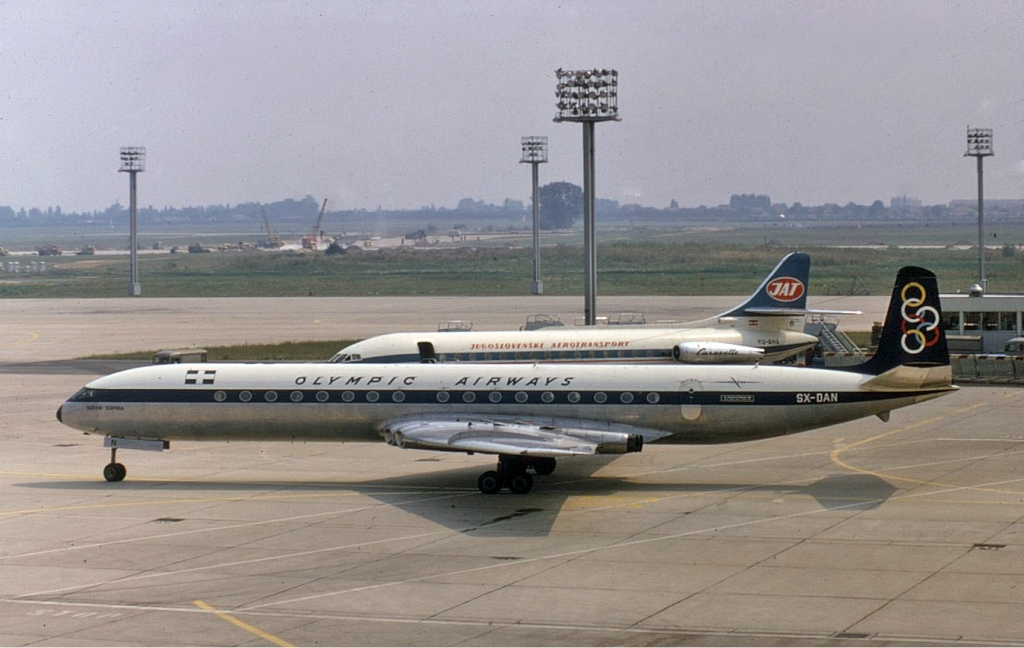
Olympic Airways Comet 4 at Paris in 1963

=== France ===
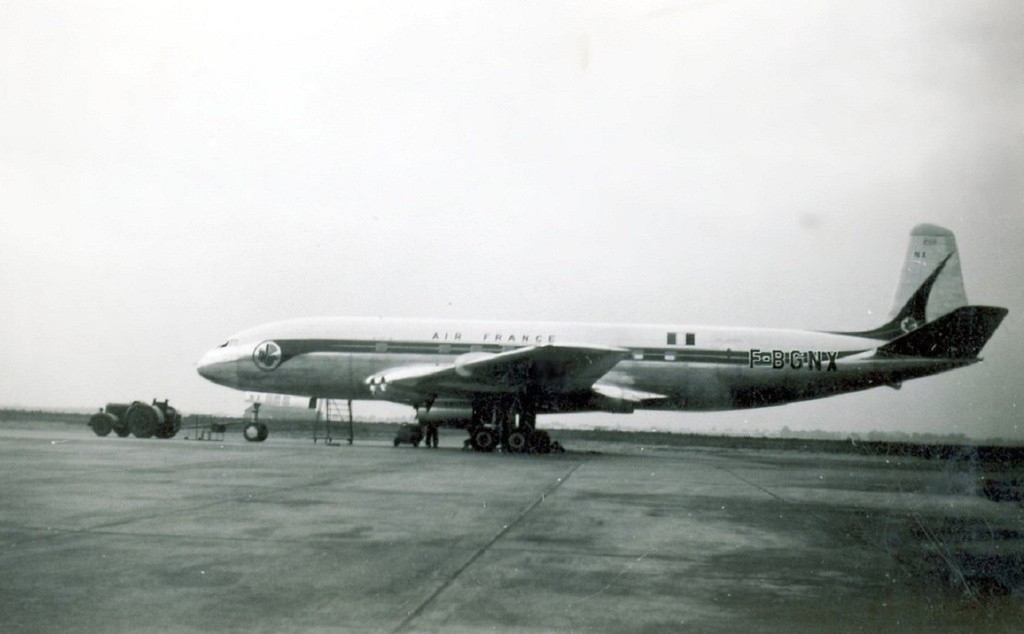
One of three Comets operated by Air France seen at the Hatfield factory in May 1953

- Air France operated three new Comet 1As briefly in the 1950s before they were withdrawn.
- Union Aéromaritime de Transport operated three new Comet 1As briefly in the 1950s, one was destroyed and two were withdrawn from service.

=== Greece ===
- Olympic Airways had four new Comet 4Bs delivered in 1960, operated in a pooling arrangement with BEA.

=== Indonesia ===
- Merpati Nusantara Airlines had a Comet 2 in 1972.

=== Kuwait ===
- Kuwait Airways operated one second-hand Comet 4 and two new Comet 4Cs in the 1960s.

=== India ===
- Air India leased a Comet 4 aircraft from the BOAC in 1962, primarily to operate routes between Mumbai and destinations in the Middle East and Southeast Asia, including Madras, Singapore, Jakarta, and Kuwait.

=== Lebanon ===
- Middle East Airlines Middle East Airlines (MEA) ordered four Comet 4Cs in 1959 which were delivered by 1961 these were supplemented by leased aircraft from BOAC (1960 and 1961) and Kuwait Airways (1968-1969). Three Comets were destroyed in 1968 following an Israeli attack on Beirut Airport.

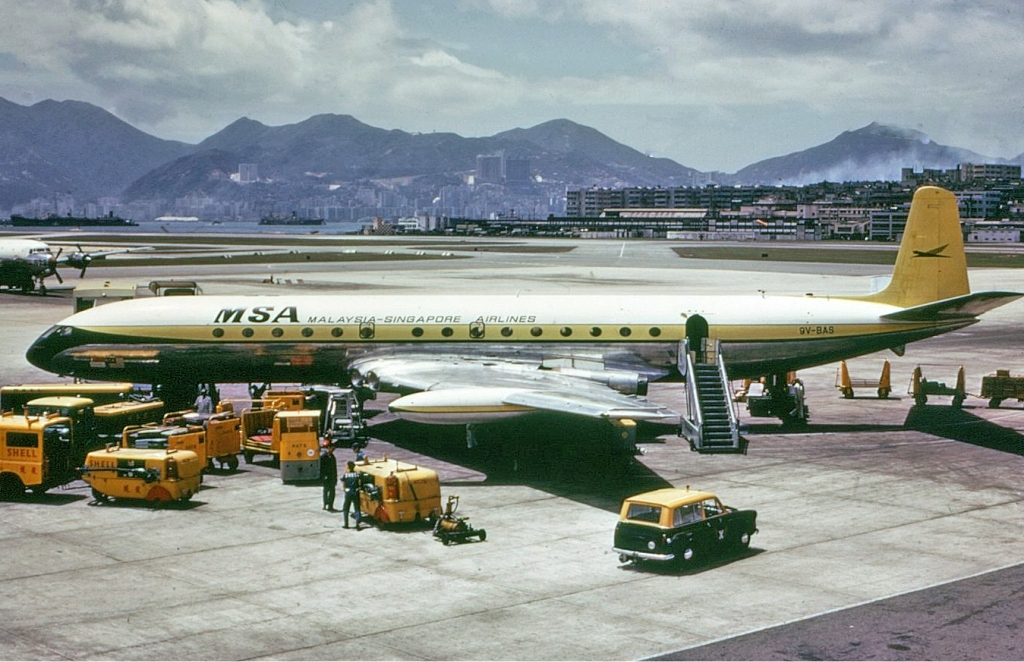
Malaysia-Singapore Airlines Comet 4 at Hong Kong in 1966

=== Malaysia ===
- Malaysian Airways operated five second-hand Comet 4s in the 1960s. The airline became Malaysia-Singapore Airlines in 1966.

=== Malaysia (Singapore) ===
- Malaysia-Singapore Airlines inherited five Comet 4s from Malaysian Airlines in 1966 and two more Comet 4s in 1967 and 1968. All sold to Dan-Air London in 1969.

=== Mexico ===
- Mexicana had three new Comet 4Cs delivered in 1960, launching its Mexico City–Los Angeles route. In March 1961, Aerovias Guest leased two of these aircraft for routes to Paris and Lisbon. Following Aerovias Guest's merger into Aeronaves de México in 1963, The aircraft were later returned to Mexicana. Subsequently, Mexicana leased two Comet 4s from BOAC; one was returned upon the expiration of the lease in 1969, The remaining aircraft were sold in 1971.

=== Portugal ===
- Transportes Aéreos Portugueses, between 1959 and 1962, chartered a British European Airways Comet 4B to operate a service between London and Lisbon.

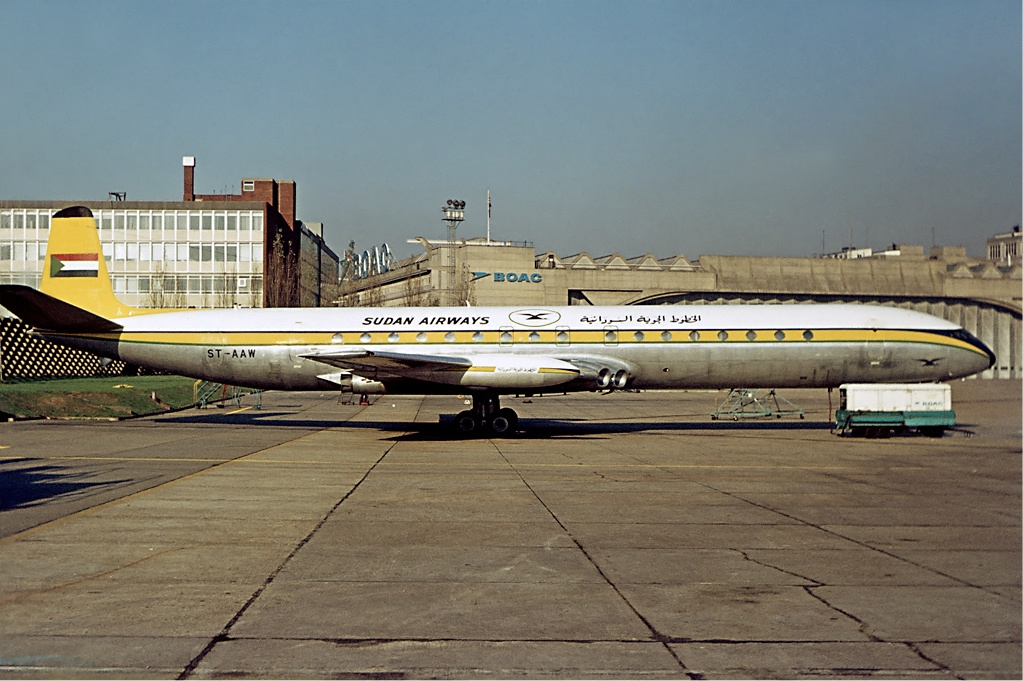
Sudan Airways Comet 4C at Heathrow in 1972

=== Saudi Arabia ===
- The Government of Saudi Arabia ordered a Comet 4C for use of King Saud bin Abdul Aziz. The Comet 4C was delivered in 1962 but crashed in 1963.

=== Nigeria ===
In 1962, Nigeria Airways operated the Comet in conjunction with BOAC to launch and execute scheduled jet services between London and Nigeria.

=== South Africa ===
- South African Airways chartered two Comets from BOAC, 1953–1954.

=== Cyprus ===
During the 1960s, Cyprus Airways operated the Comet in conjunction with British European Airways to execute scheduled services on routes linking Nicosia, Athens, Rome, and London.

=== Sudan ===
- Sudan Airways operated two new Comet 4Cs in the 1960s and early 1970s.

=== United Kingdom ===
- BEA Airtours was a subsidiary of British European Airways formed to operate IT charter flights using Comet 4Bs transferred from BEA in 1970. The aircraft we converted to 109-seat single-class tourist layout and ten aircraft were operated until being sold from 1972 when replaced by Boeing 707s.
- British European Airways (BEA) in 1957 BEA ordered six Comet 4Bs with the first two delivered on 16 Nov 1959 for use on European routes. The airline eventually operated 18 different Comet 4Bs, two were lost in accidents and most were transferred to BEA Airtours in 1970.
- British Overseas Airways Corporation (BOAC) had a total of 10 Comet 1As delivered in the 1950s, with survivors withdrawn after the Cohen Inquiry findings on early Comet crashes. A total of 19 Comet 4s were delivered from 1957.
- Channel Airways obtained five Comet 4Bs from British European Airways in 1970 and these were re-configured to a high-density 109-seat configuration for the inclusive tour charters from the United Kingdom. Among them, one was Comet 4 acquired from Mexicana in 1971 and used as a source of spare parts, the remainder were obtained by Dan-Air when Channel went into receivership in 1972.
- Dan-Air, also known as Dan-Air London, bought all of the surviving flyable Comet 4s from the late 1960s into the 1970s; some were for spares reclamation but most were operated on the carrier's inclusive tour charters. A total of 48 Comets of all marks were acquired by the airline.

== Military ==
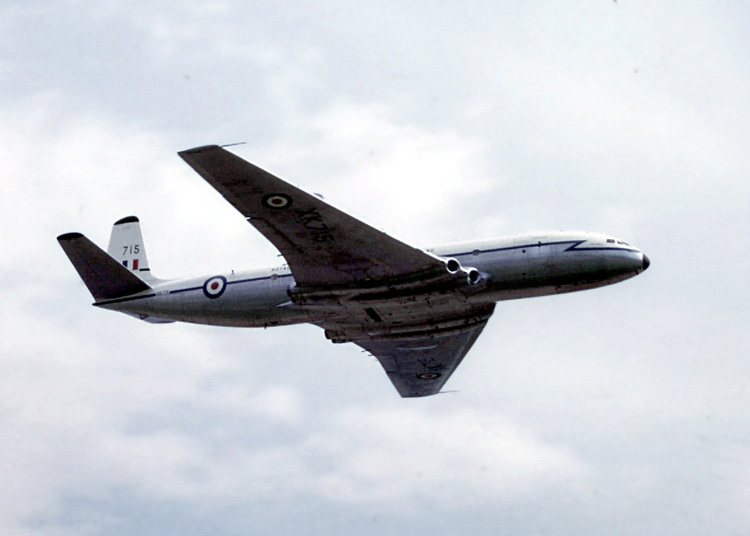
Comet C2 XK715 of No. 216 Squadron Royal Air Force at Filton Bristol in 1964

=== Canada ===
- Royal Canadian Air Force
  - 412 Squadron (1953–1963) Comet 1A (later retrofitted to 1XB)

=== United Kingdom ===
- Royal Air Force
  - 51 Squadron (1958–1975) Comet C2, 2R
  - 192 Squadron (1957–1958) Comet C2, 2R
  - 216 Squadron (1956–1975) Comet C2 and C4

== Other (used as a research platform) ==
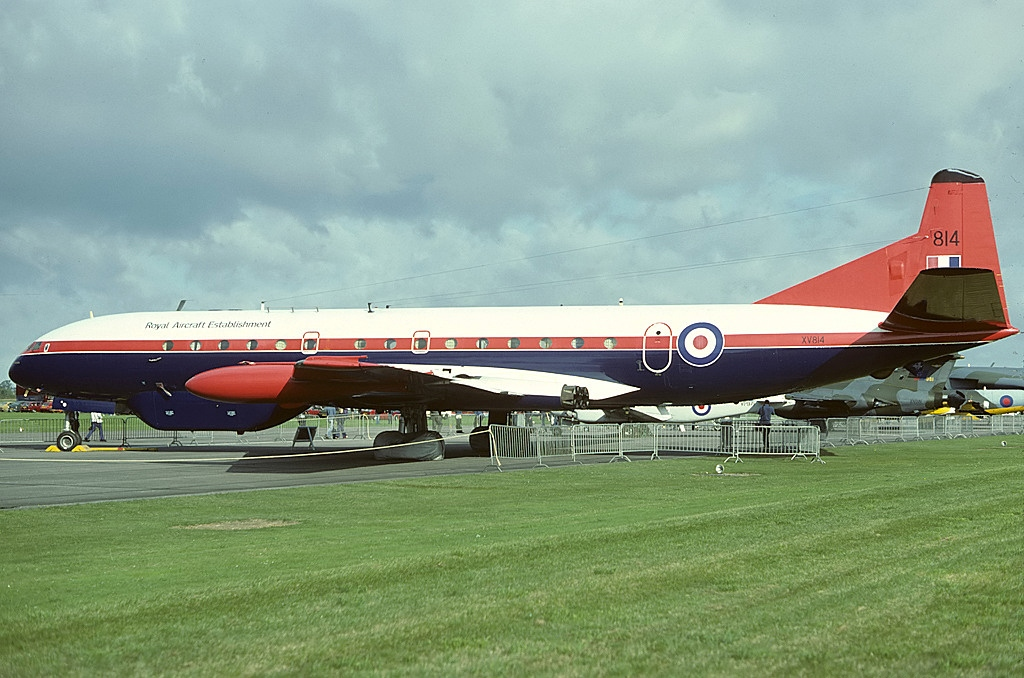
The special comet-shaped passenger plane, serial number XV814, was used as a research platform.

- Royal Aircraft Establishment

== See also ==
- Hawker Siddeley Nimrod
