= Aeroméxico Contigo =

Low-cost airline of Mexico

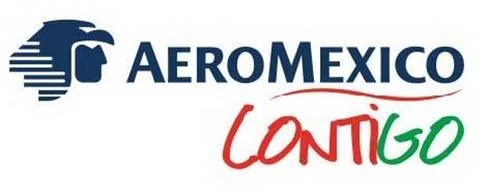
| IATA | ICAO | Call sign |
|---|---|---|
| AM | AMX | CONTIGO |
- Founded: June 17, 2013; 13 years ago
- AOC #: ASMF152F
- Hubs: Guadalajara; Mexico City
- Frequent-flyer program: Club Premier
- Alliance: SkyTeam (affiliate)
- Fleet size: 9
- Destinations: 15
- Parent company: Grupo Aeroméxico
- Headquarters: Guadalajara, Jalisco, Mexico
- Website: www.aeromexico.com

Aerovías de México Contigo S.A. de C.V. operating as Aeroméxico Contigo (Aeroméxico with you) is a Grupo Aeroméxico "airline within an airline" operating select US and Mexican routes from its hubs at Guadalajara and Mexico City. Their fleet consists of all-economy Boeing 737-800 aircraft, allowing them to compete with low-cost airlines, such as Volaris. It also serves as a feeder airline for mainline Aeroméxico and Aeroméxico Connect on the most popular and busiest routes.

== History ==
On 17 June 2013, Grupo Aeroméxico announced that it would launch a new subsidiary to help with their busiest international and domestic routes. The airline started with four wet-leased Boeing 737-800 aircraft. Their inaugural flight was on 1 October 2013 on the Guadalajara-Los Angeles route.

In 2015, Contigo launched flights to LA/Ontario, Fresno, and several other smaller, secondary airports in Northern California.

Starting in 2016, to compete against other Mexican low-cost airlines, Contigo began eliminating free hot meals and checked baggage. Contigo's fares and costs tend to be significantly lower than those of mainline Aeroméxico, often rivaling those of Volaris and Interjet Airlines.

The COVID-19 pandemic deeply affected the global aviation industry, including Aeroméxico. Aeroméxico's stock dropped during first half of 2020 and rumors about bankruptcy. On June 30, Aeroméxico voluntarily filed for Chapter 11 bankruptcy in the United States. However, day-to-day operations continued as the company restructured. Existing tickets were honored and employees continued to be paid as usual.

== Destinations ==
Aeroméxico Contigo serves the following destinations:

- Cancún - Cancún International Airport
- Chicago - O'Hare International Airport
- Culiacán - Culiacán International Airport
- Fresno - Fresno Yosemite International Airport
- Guadalajara - Guadalajara International Airport
- León/Guanajuato - Bajío International Airport
- Los Angeles - Los Angeles International Airport
- Mexicali - Mexicali International Airport
- Mexico City - Mexico City International Airport
- Morelia - General Francisco Mujica International Airport
- Ontario - Ontario International Airport
- Sacramento - Sacramento International Airport
- San Francisco - San Francisco International Airport
- San Jose - San Jose International Airport
- Tijuana - Tijuana International Airport

== Fleet ==
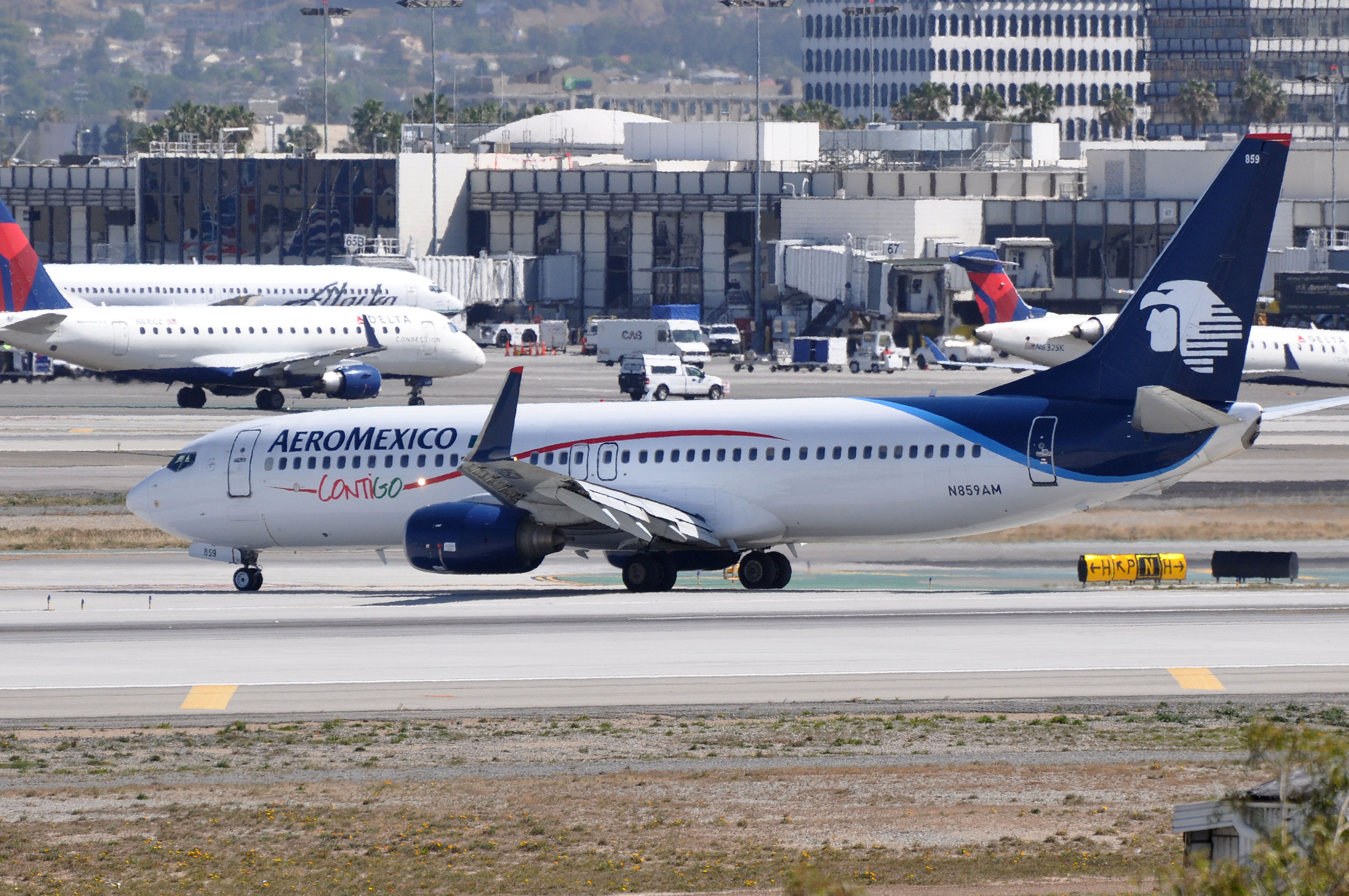
Aeroméxico Contigo Boeing 737-800

As of April 2019, the Aeroméxico Contigo fleet consists of the following.

| Airplane | In service | Orders | Passengers | | | Notes |
| Airplane | In service | Orders | C | Y | Total | Notes |
|---|---|---|---|---|---|---|
| Boeing 737-800 | 9 | — | 18 | 168 | 186 | |
| Total | 9 | — | | | | |
