= Aeroméxico Travel =

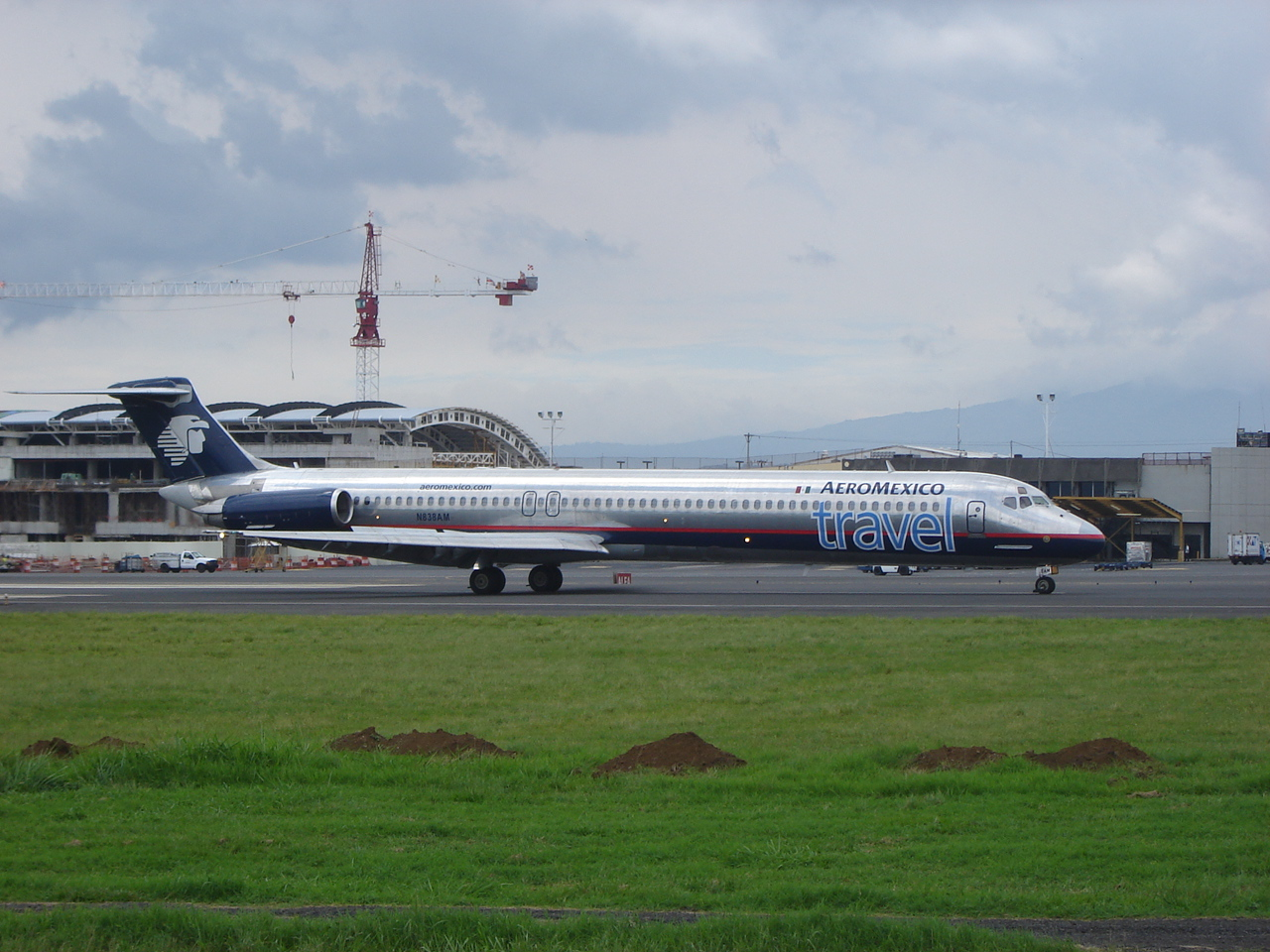
IATA	ICAO	Call sign
AM	ATE	TRAVEL
- Founded: 2008; 18 years ago
- Commenced operations: June 2, 2008; 18 years ago
- Ceased operations: 2011; 15 years ago
- Hubs: Cancún International Airport
- Frequent-flyer program: Club Premier
- Alliance: SkyTeam (affiliate)
- Fleet size: 3
- Destinations: 9
- Parent company: Grupo Aeroméxico
- Headquarters: Mexico City, Mexico
- Key people: Andrés Conesa Labastida (CEO)
- Website: http://www.aeromexico.com

Servicio Mexicano de Vuelos de Fletamento S. A. de C. V., operating as Aeroméxico Travel, was a charter flight subsidiary of Aeroméxico, and started operations on June 2, 2008, with the inaugural flight AM6771 from Mexico City to Cancún. The airline was in charge of charter flights from Mexican resort destinations to several cities in the United States and Canada. In August 2011, its parent company, Aeroméxico, decided to retire the "Travel" brand and focus on scheduled operations instead.

== Destinations ==
The airline operated flights to the United States, as well as charter flights from Mexico City and Monterrey to Cancún, Puerto Vallarta, Huatulco, Mérida, Mazatlán, and Cozumel. The airline had charter flights to Minneapolis from Cancún during the winter and early spring. Seasonal flights from Chicago-O'Hare to Mexico City, Monterrey, and Morelia were also flown in 2011.

== Fleet ==
The Aeroméxico Travel fleet consisted of the following aircraft.

Aeroméxico Travel fleet
Aircraft	Total	Passengers	Aircraft registration
McDonnell Douglas MD-83	3	155	N583MD, N838AM, N848SH
McDonnell Douglas MD-87	1	130	XA-TXC

- Aeroméxico Travel had an average fleet age of 22.9 years
