= Flight 229 =

Flight 229 may refer to:

Listed chronologically

- Pan Am Flight 229, disappeared on 28 July 1938
- Aeroflot Flight 229, crashed on 14 June 1953
- Aeroméxico Flight 229, crashed on 20 June 1973
