= Flight 110 =

Flight 110 may refer to the following incidents involving commercial airliners:

Listed chronologically

- Malév Flight 110, crashed in Ukraine on 16 September 1971
- Pan Am Flight 110, attacked by terrorists at a Rome airport on 17 December 1973
- Aeroméxico Flight 110, crashed after losing pressurization on 8 November 1981
- TACA Flight 110, made an emergency landing after losing power in both engines on 24 May 1988
- Avioimpex Flight 110, crashed near Ohrid, Macedonia, on 20 November 1993

== See also ==
- Pan Am Flight 1-10, crashed in Ireland on 15 April 1948
- STS-110, a successful Space Shuttle mission in April 2002
