= Flight 401 =

Flight 401 may refer to:

- Aeronaves de México Flight 401, crashed on 19 January 1961
- Iberia Flight 401, crashed on 5 May 1965
- Dominicana de Aviación Flight 401, crashed on 23 June 1969
- Eastern Air Lines Flight 401, crashed on 29 December 1972
