= Aeromexpress =

Mexican cargo airline

| IATA | ICAO | Call sign |
|---|---|---|
| QO | MPX | AEROMEXPRESS |
- Founded: 1990; 36 years ago
- Commenced operations: June 9, 1994; 32 years ago
- Ceased operations: 2004; 22 years ago as an airline, 2011; 15 years ago as a cargo handler (became Aeromexico Cargo)
- Alliance: SkyTeam Cargo
- Fleet size: Around 100
- Destinations: 65
- Parent company: Aeroméxico
- Headquarters: Mexico City, Mexico
- Website: http://www.aeromexicocargo.com.mx

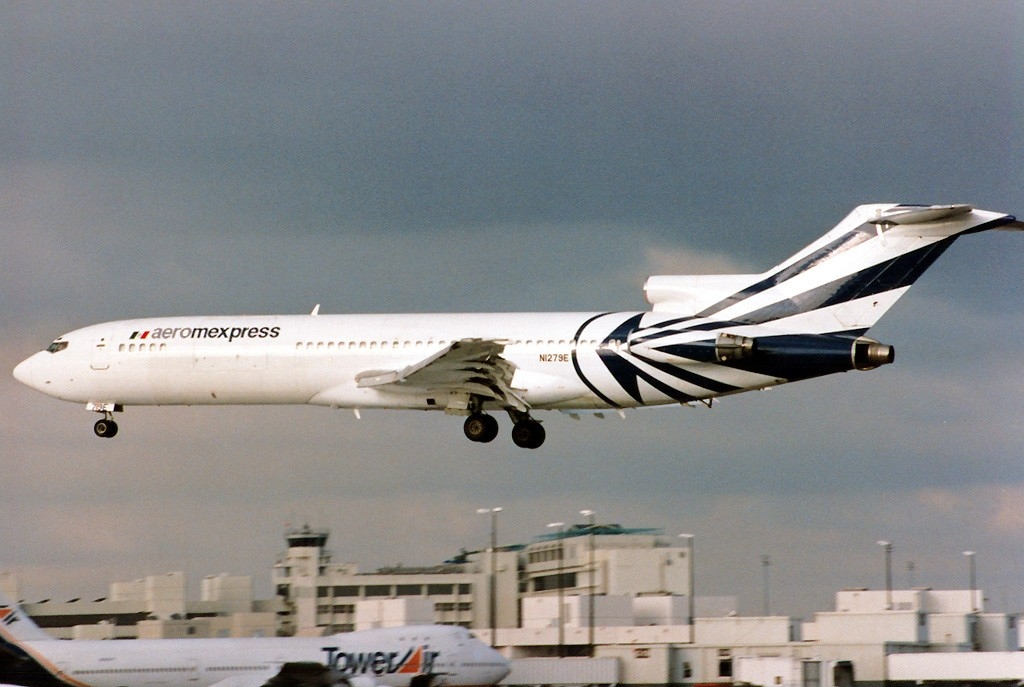
An Aeromexpress Boeing 727-2Q6 Adv.(F) landing at Miami International Airport

Aeromexpress was an all-cargo company based in Mexico City, Mexico. It operated air cargo services transporting general cargo, perishables, printed matter, live animals, works of art, securities and restricted products.

== History ==
The airline was established in 1990 and started operations on 9 June 1994. It was established to manage cargo operations for parent company Aeroméxico and also helped to manage cargo operations for Mexicana. It was owned by Grupo Aeroméxico (50%). It ceased operating as an airline in 2004 and continued operating as a cargo handler using Mexicana and Aeromexico fleet until Mexicana's bankruptcy and creation of Aerovías Empresa de Cargo (Aeromexico Cargo) as a wholly owned subsidiary of Grupo Aeroméxico in 2011.

== Services ==
Aeromexpress operated to/from every destination of Aeroméxico through the cargo compartments of the airlines' aircraft.

== Fleet ==
- Aeroméxico fleet

Used many companies as contract or freight charter:

- Boeing 727-200F
- ABX Air 767-200F
- Cargolux 747-400F
- Aeromexico fleet
