= Aeroméxico Flight 230 =

1981 aviation accident in Mexico

- The aircraft in flames after running off the runway

Accident
- Date: 27 July 1981
- Summary: Runway excursion due to bad weather
- Site: Chihuahua International Airport, Chihuahua, Mexico; 28.698867°N 105.964245°W

Aircraft
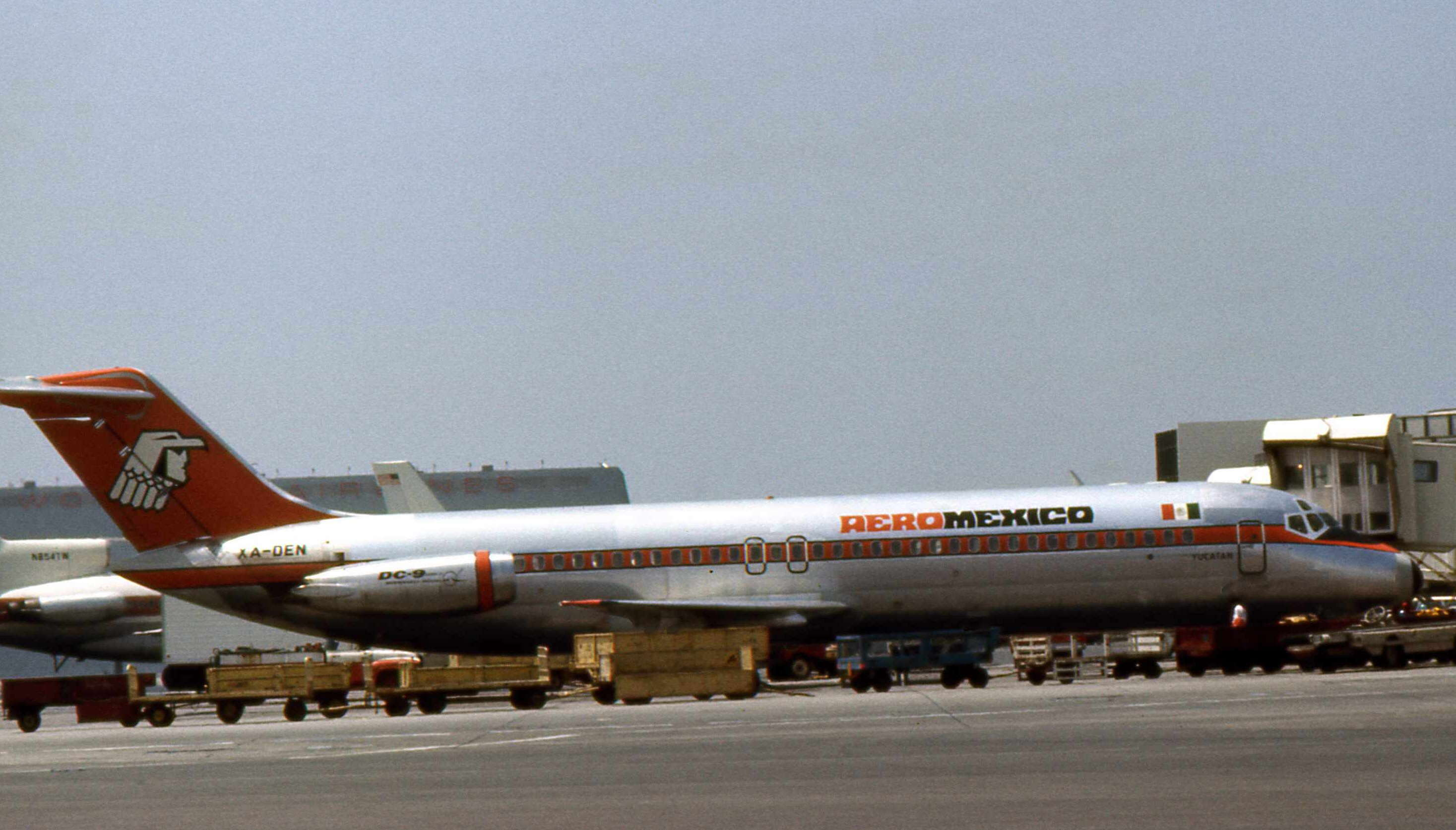
- XA-DEN, the aircraft involved in the accident, pictured in 1974
- Aircraft type: McDonnell Douglas DC-9-32
- Aircraft name: Yucatan
- Operator: Aeroméxico
- IATA flight No.: AM230
- ICAO flight No.: AMX230
- Call sign: AEROMEXICO 230
- Registration: XA-DEN
- Flight origin: Monterey-General Mariano Escobedo International Airport
- 1st stopover: Chihuahua International Airport
- Last stopover: Hermosillo International Airport
- Destination: Tijuana International Airport
- Occupants: 66
- Passengers: 60
- Crew: 6
- Fatalities: 32
- Injuries: 34
- Survivors: 34

Aeroméxico Flight 230 was a domestic passenger flight from Monterrey to Tijuana, with stopovers in Chihuahua City and Hermosillo. On July 27, 1981, the McDonnell Douglas DC-9 Yucatán experienced a hard landing and runway excursion at Chihuahua International Airport, before breaking up and catching on fire. Thirty-two people were killed in the accident.

Weather conditions at Chihuahua were very poor at the time of the accident, with heavy rain and wind. Crosswind is believed to have caused the plane to land off-center of the runway and break up, after bouncing off the ground.

== Background ==
The aircraft involved was a McDonnell Douglas DC-9-32, registered as XA-DEN with MSN 47621/729. It was named Yucatán by Aeromexico, and was delivered new to the company in 1974. At the time of the crash, the aircraft was 7 years old.

== Accident ==
Flight 230 was flying the first of three legs towards its final destination of General Abelardo L. Rodríguez International Airport in Tijuana, Baja California. Visibility in Chihuahua was extremely low, caused by isolated cumulonimbus clouds, strong squalls and showers that were expected during approach and landing. Wind speeds varied from 10 to 60 knots.

Air traffic controllers at Chihuahua cleared Flight 23 to land on runway 18L. As the flight lined up for approach at around 4:30 p.m. CST and 6 miles away from the airport, captain Victor Manuel Ortigoza requested to change the aircraft’s approach to runway 36R instead. ATC approved the request, but warned the crew that weather conditions would be identical.

As Flight 230 prepared to touch down at around 4:35, crosswinds suddenly increased from six to 70 knots and blew the aircraft approximately 150 meters to the right of runway 36R, causing the aircraft bounced off the ground. When the aircraft descended again, it struck the ground with enough force to break up. The aircraft then entered and left the runway before catching on fire.

Thirty-four passengers and crew managed to escape the wreckage through the emergency exits; smoke inhalation and fire from the aircraft’s burning fuel caused the deaths of the remaining passengers, who were trapped.
