= Julio Zinser =

Mexican pilot

Julio Francisco Rodrigo Zinser Laue
- Born: 14 January 1892; 134 years ago Mexico City, Mexico
- Died: 29 December 1962; 63 years ago Acapulco, Guerrero
- Occupation: Pilot of Aeronaves de Mexico (Aeroméxico)
- Spouse: Adela Islas Verástegui
- Parent: Father:Carl Juilius Zinser Mother:Elizabeth Sofia Laue

Julio Zinser (January 14, 1892-December 29, 1962) was a Mexican airplane pilot. He was the first pilot in Mexican history to have a licence. It was not until 1934 that the first Commercial Pilot Applications ever to be issued by any Certified Issuers were issued and the first one registered as Folio AAA-000-000-001.

== Life ==
Born on January 14, 1892, in Mexico City at six months of age he moved with his parents to Germany, where he studied quantum chemistry. He lived in Germany until World War I still wanting to be a quantum chemist. When the war started in 1914, he moved back to Mexico where he studied aviation in a military school. He got his military license in 1932 and in 1934 he received the first ever commercial license to be issued in Mexico. Then he soughta to buy a plane, a Stinson SR Reliant (registered XB-AJI), so he contacted Antonio Diaz Lombardo, the founder and owner of Aeronaves de Mexico (now Aeroméxico). Zisner flew the Stinson SR Reliant during its maiden flight which was to be the first flight ever of Aeronaves de Mexico on 14 September 1934; 91 years ago on the route from Mexico City to Acapulco. From that point on he was piloting aircraft until he retired in 1953 at the age of 61 and lived in his residence in Acapulco until he died of natural causes on December 29, 1962, at 70 years of age.
