= Torre MAPFRE =

Office skyscraper in Mexico City

MAPFRE Tower
- Torre MAPFRE
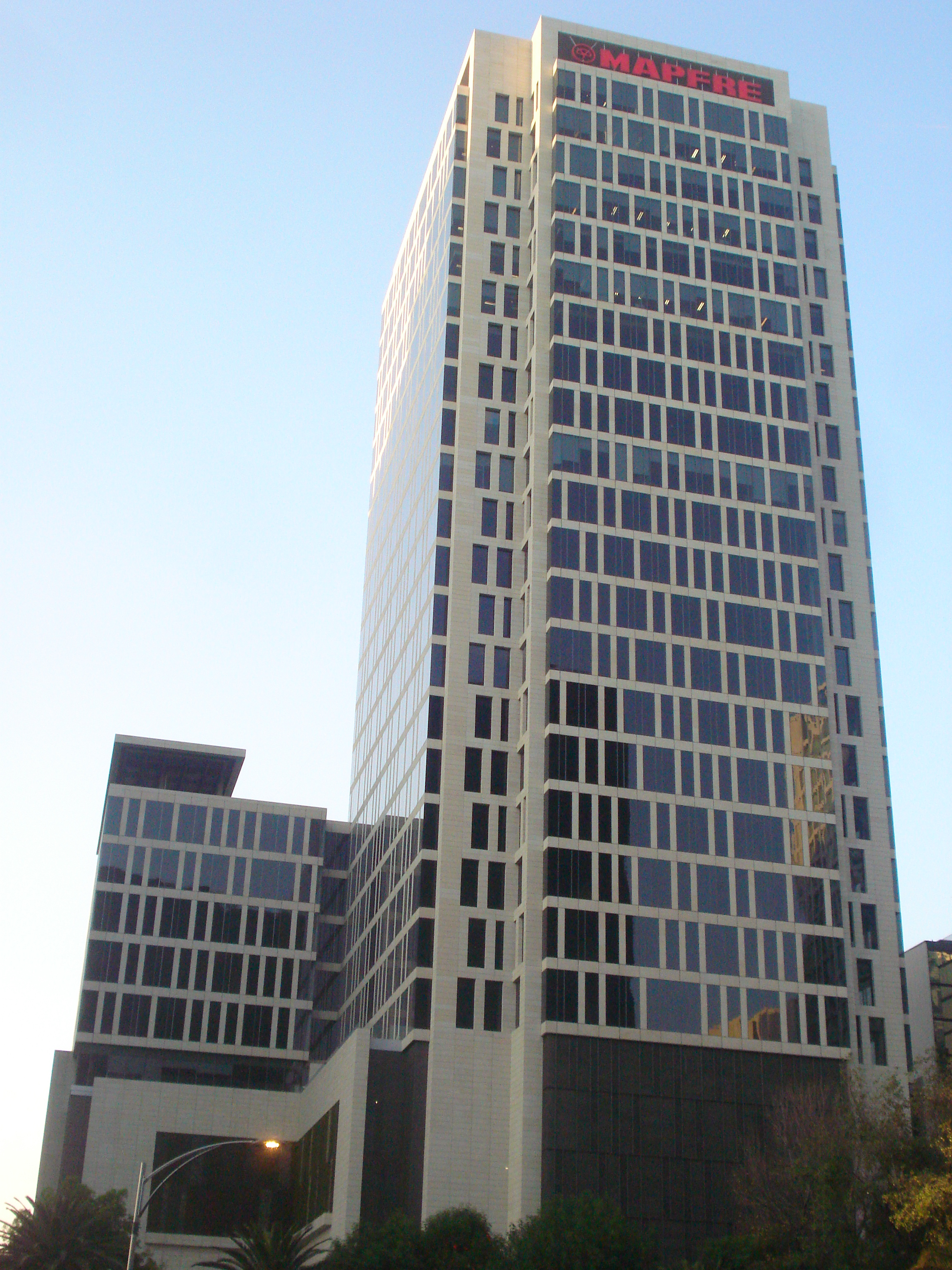
- Torre MAPFRE in 2014
- Location in Mexico City

General information
- Location: Mexico City, Mexico
- Coordinates: 19.4297081°N 99.1637054°W

Height
- Height: 124 metres (407 ft)

Torre MAPFRE (MAPFRE Tower) is a 124-meter, 27-story office building at Paseo de la Reforma 243 in Mexico City, at the Glorieta de la Palma ("palm" roundabout) at the intersection of Río Rhin avenue in the Colonia Cuauhtémoc neighborhood. It is the tenth tallest tower on the emblematic boulevard.

== Tenants ==
Source: Google Maps

- Aeroméxico headquarters
- Investabank
- Halliburton
- Banco Ve Por Más
- Beiersdorf
- Dow
- Sports World gym
- IOS Offices
- Embassy of Japan
