= Andrés Conesa =

Mexican businessman

Andrés Conesa Labastida (born June 15, 1969) is the CEO of the Mexican airline Aeroméxico and chairman of the airline alliance SkyTeam.

Conesa was appointed CEO of Grupo Aeromexico in 2005. He is a member of the board of governors of the International Air Transport Association (IATA) since 2008 and was appointed chairman of the board starting June 2015, becoming the first Mexican to hold this position. In 2013, he was elected to chair the executive committee of the ALTA (Latin American and Caribbean Air Transport Association). Conesa also chaired the Directive Council of the National Chamber of Aviation (CANAERO) in Mexico during 2013.

Andrés Conesa has a degree in economy from the Autonomous Technological Institute of Mexico (ITAM) in Mexico City and a Ph.D. in economics from MIT. He was awarded Fulbright and a MacArthur scholarship for his postgraduate studies abroad, and the National Economics Prize in Mexico in 1997.

Conesa was married to the Mexican golf star Lorena Ochoa, who announced her retirement from the sport in 2010 in order to start their family.

== Positions held ==
=== Mexican public administration ===
- Advisor to the Secretary of Finance and Public Credit from 1990 to 1991
- Advisor to the Secretary of the Economic Cabinet of the Presidency from 1991 to 1993
- Chief Advisor to the Undersecretary of Finance and Public Credit from 1997 to 1998
- Director General for International Financial Affairs in the Ministry of Finance from 1998 to 2000

Conesa Labastida served as:

- Director General of Economic Policy at the Ministry of Finance from 2000 to 2003
- Deputy Undersecretary for Public Credit from August 2003 to December 2004

=== Aeromexico and Cintra ===
He has served as:

- Director of Grupo Aeromexico SAB de CV since 2005
- Chairman of Consorcio Aeromexico S.A. de C.V. (formerly, Cintra Sa De Cv) starting in September, 2004

=== Boards of directors ===
- Mexican Stock Exchange, in 2007
- Genomma Lab Internacional, since 2012
- IEnova, since 2013

== Degrees and awards ==
He obtained the Fulbright and Ford MacArthur scholarships, and in 1997 he was awarded the Banamex National Prize in Economic Research. Conesa Labastida holds a BA in economics from the Instituto Autonomo de Mexico (ITAM) in Mexico City and a PhD in economics from the Massachusetts Institute of Technology.

- President of the Directive Council of the National Chamber of Aviation (CANAERO)
- Good Neighbor Award by the Bi-national Board of the United States-Mexico Chamber of Commerce.
- Federico Bloch Award from the Latin American and Caribbean Air Transport Association (ALTA)
