= Aeroméxico =

National airline of Mexico

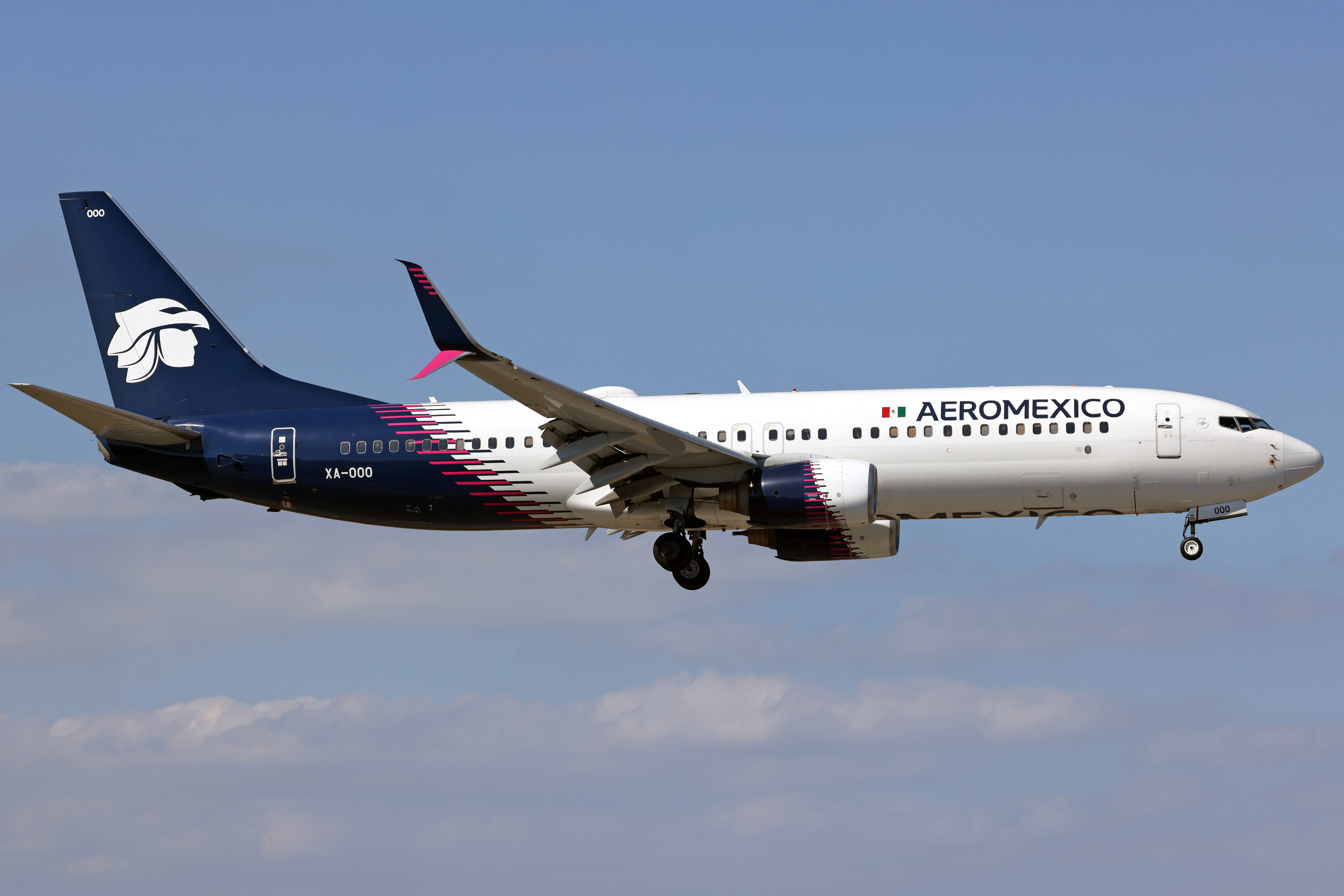
- Boeing 737-800 in 2026
IATA	ICAO	Call sign
AM	AMX	AEROMEXICO
- Founded: 14 September 1934; 92 years ago (as Aeronaves de México S.A. de C.V.)
- Commenced operations: 14 September 1934; 92 years ago (as Aeronaves de México S.A. de C.V.); 1 October 1988; 38 years ago (as Aerovias de México S.A. de C.V.)
- AOC #: ASMF152F
- Hubs: Mexico City
- Secondary hubs: Guadalajara; Monterrey
- Frequent-flyer program: Aeroméxico Rewards
- Alliance: SkyTeam; SkyTeam Cargo
- Subsidiaries: Delta Air Lines (20%) (shared); Aeroméxico Cargo; Aeroméxico Connect; Aeroméxico Contigo; Aeroméxico Express; Aeroméxico Servicios; Aeroperú (1973-1999)
- Fleet size: 135
- Destinations: 100
- Parent company: Grupo Aeroméxico
- Headquarters: Torre MAPFRE, Mexico City, Mexico
- Key people: Andrés Conesa Labastida (CEO)
- Revenue: ▼US$ 1.3247 billion (2020)
- Net income: ▼ -US$ 1.9753 billion (2020)
- Employees: 13,880 (2023)
- Website: www.aeromexico.com

Aerovías de México, S.A. de C.V. (lit. 'Airways of Mexico, Public Limited') operating as Aeroméxico (IPA: [aˌeɾoˈmexiko]; stylized as AEROMEXICO), is the flag carrier of Mexico based in Mexico City. It operates scheduled services to more than 120 destinations in Mexico, North, South, and Central America, the Caribbean, Europe, and Asia. Its main base and hub is Mexico City International Airport, with secondary hubs in Guadalajara and Monterrey. The headquarters is in the Torre MAPFRE on Paseo de la Reforma.

Grupo Aeroméxico includes Aeroméxico and Aeroméxico Connect (regional subsidiary). The group currently holds the No. 2 place in domestic market share behind Volaris, with 24.2%; and No. 1 place in international market share with 15.8%, in the 12 months ending March 2020, becoming Mexico's largest international airline group. Aeroméxico is one of the four founding members of the SkyTeam airline alliance, along with Air France, Delta Air Lines and Korean Air.

Aeroméxico works closely with the U.S. carrier Delta Air Lines, which owns part of Aeroméxico and in 2015 announced its intention to acquire up to 49% of the latter's shares. On 8 May 2017, a joint commercial agreement (JCA), came into effect, whereby the airlines share information, costs, and revenues on all their flights between the United States and Mexico.

In 2016, Aeroméxico flew 19.703 million passengers (up 5.0% vs. previous year), of which 13.047 million were domestic (+3.7%) and 6.656 million were international (+7.6%). It flew 34.776 million revenue passenger kilometers (RPKs), had 43.362 million available seat kilometers (ASKs), and an 80.3% load factor.

== History ==
=== 1934 ===
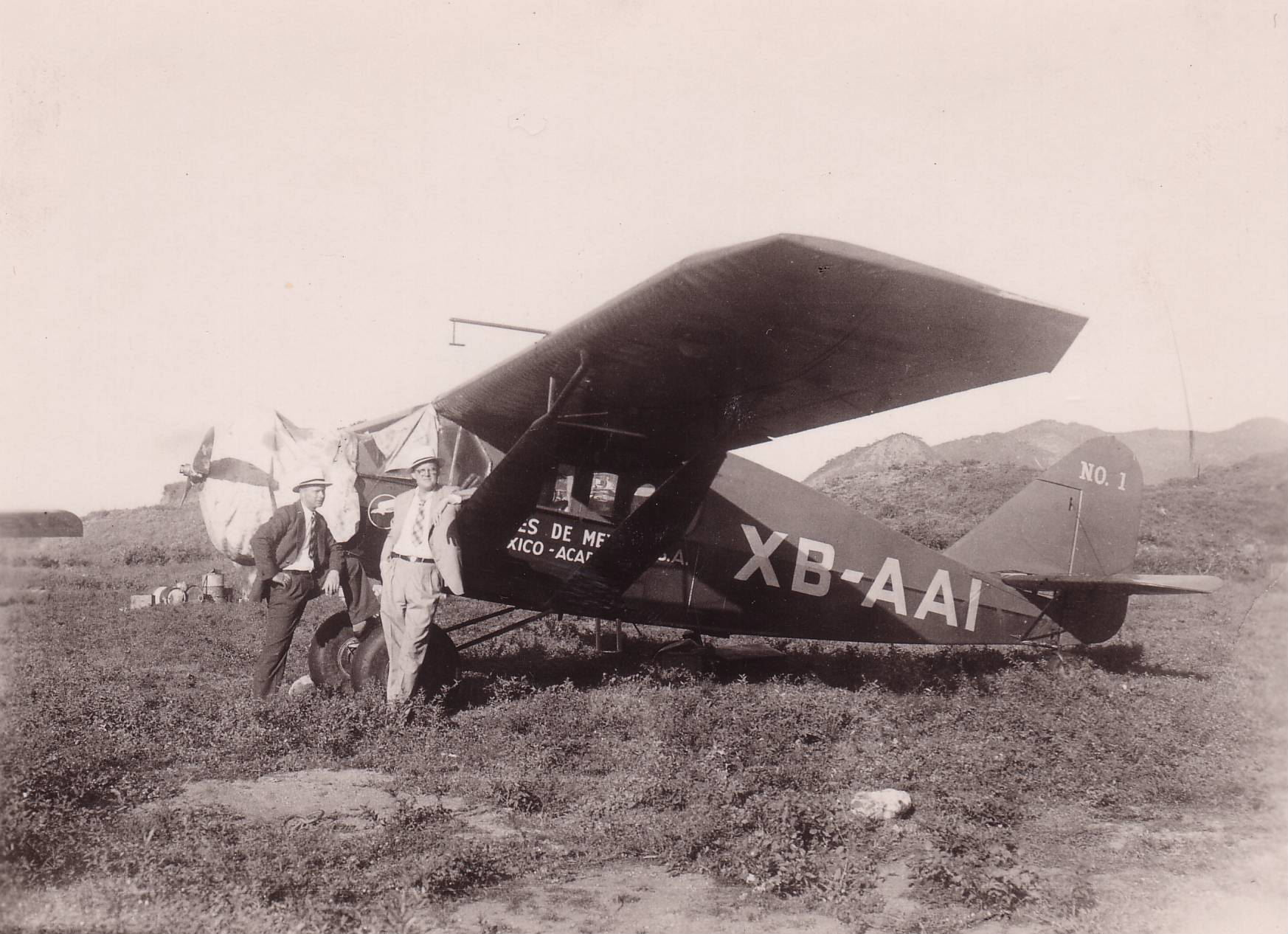
A Bellanca aircraft which operated the México City–Acapulco run ca. 1935.

The airline was established as Aeronaves de México on 15 September 1934, by Antonio Díaz Lombardo. Its first aircraft was a Stinson SR Reliant 5A (registered XB-AJI). Julio Zinser piloted the maiden flight on the Mexico City – Acapulco route on 14 September 1934.

=== 1940s ===
When World War II began, the airline continued to grow with the help of Pan Am, which owned 40% of the new Mexican airline and upgraded the fleet with DC-2s and Boeing 247s. Aeroméxico saw few changes for the next two decades. However, during the 1950s, renovation began, and the airline took over various small competitor companies across the country, including Aerovías Guest (the second airline of the country at that time) that held the routes to Madrid and Paris. Aeroméxico added aircraft, including the Douglas DC-3 and its successor, the Douglas DC-4.

=== 1950s ===
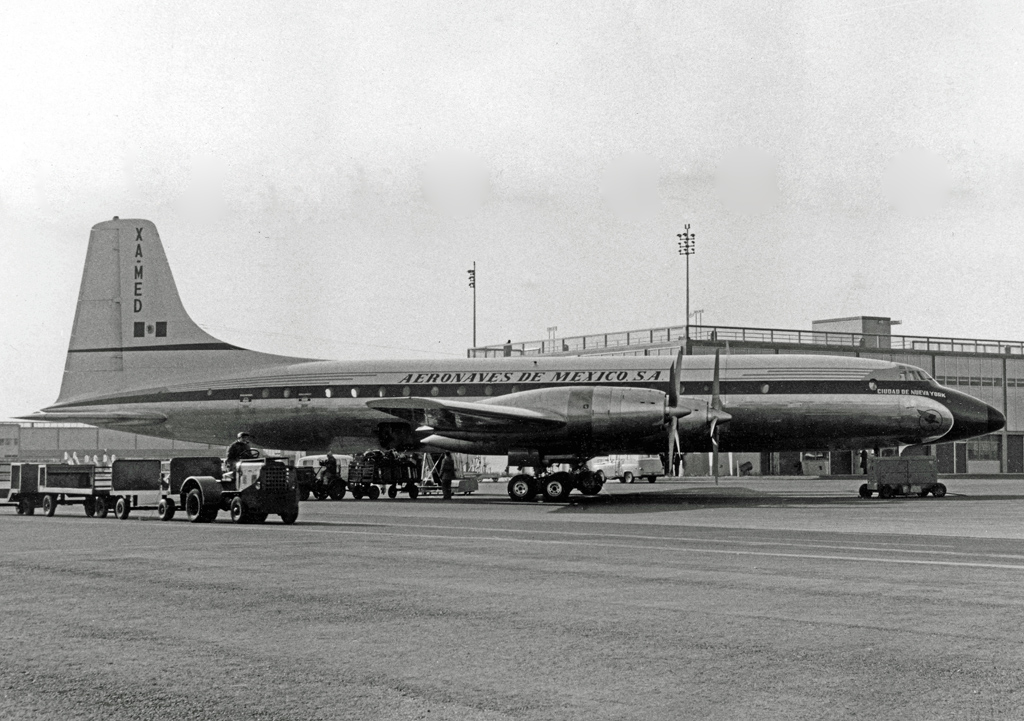
Bristol Britannia at New York International Airport in 1958.

During the late 1950s, the Douglas DC-4s were replaced by some pressurized Douglas DC-6s and two Bristol Britannias (the first turboprop passenger aircraft in the fleet) and in 1958, services were inaugurated to Idlewild Airport (now JFK) using the Britannias. The Mexico City-New York route would prove profitable for "Aeronaves" and its North American competitors. The airline was nationalised in 1959.

=== 1960s ===
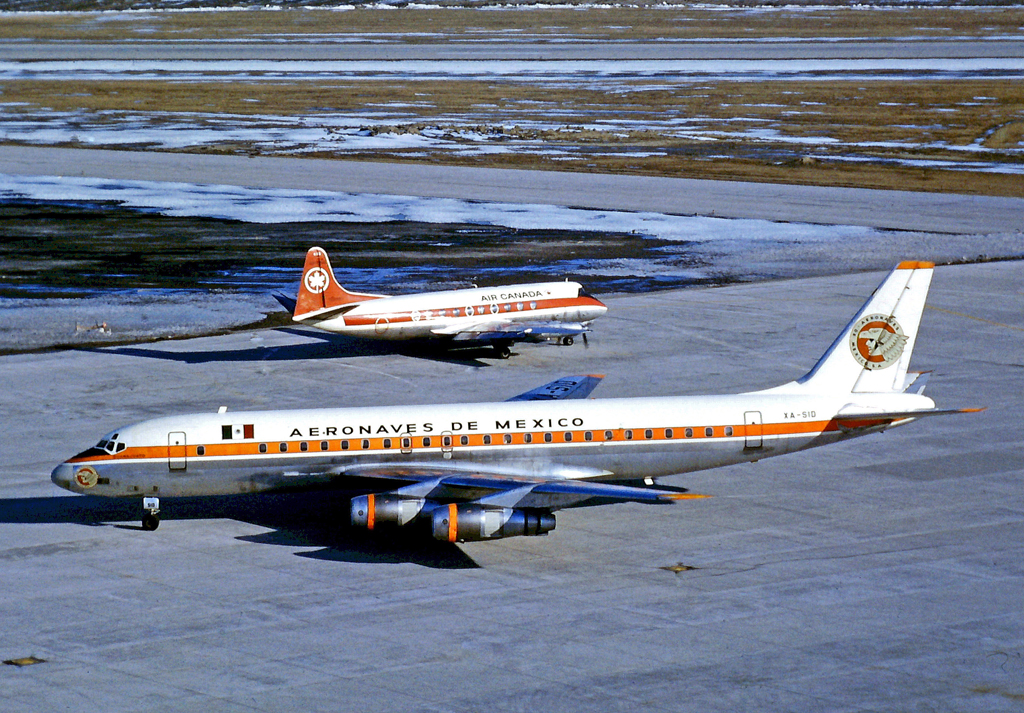
Douglas DC-8 at Toronto International Airport in 1971.

In the early 1960s, the fleet of Aeronaves de México (Aeroméxico) included Douglas DC-3, Douglas DC-6, and Bristol Britannia aircraft. Starting in 1961, "Aeronaves" began replacing its piston-engined aircraft with new jets. The first jet-engined aircraft were a pair of Douglas DC-8s. The DC-8s were used on routes within Mexico and to New York City. In 1963, Aeronaves de México (Aeroméxico) took over Aerovias Guest airlines and they were merged under the name Aeronaves de México. Later in the 1960s, more DC-8s were added, and service to Europe was resumed, operated by two de Havilland Comet 4C jet aircraft dry-leased by Aerovías Guest prior to the merger.

=== 1970s ===
The 1970s brought dramatic changes for Aeroméxico. In 1970, under a government plan, Mexican domestic airlines were nationalized into an integrated air transport system under the control of Aeronaves de México. The system included eight smaller carriers, although these were later disbanded. During the early 1970s, the remaining Douglas DC-6 and Bristol Britannia aircraft were retired. A new color scheme (orange and black) was introduced and the airline changed its name from "Aeronaves de México" to its current, shortened version of Aeroméxico in February 1972.

One of Aeronaves de Mexico's subsidiaries during that era was named Aeronaves del Sureste ("Southeast Air Ships"). That subsidiary had a mix of Twin-Otter and DC-9 jet aircraft.

Aeroméxico, as one of the launch customers of the McDonnell Douglas DC-10-30 program, received the first of its aircraft in 1974. That same year, the airline also took delivery of its first seven McDonnell Douglas DC-9-32s. During this period, the airline's popularity and visibility grew dramatically. This was due in part to Aeroméxico's involvement in Mexican movies. Basically, every time characters in any movie produced in Mexico had to fly somewhere, they were depicted as flying on Aeroméxico aircraft.

=== 1980s ===
The early 1980s were marked by expansion. A new color scheme was introduced (orange paint and silver), two DC-10-15s and a DC-10-30 were added in 1981 and in 1984. Aeroméxico, one of the launch customers of the McDonnell Douglas MD-82 (an elongated version of the DC-9), received its first two in late 1981. Between 1980 and 1981, eight more DC-9-32 aircraft were added. In 1982, Aeroméxico acquired four more MD-80s for $100 million, increasing the total number of aircraft in the company's fleet to 43.

On 31 August 1986, the company suffered its only fatal accident outside Mexico when Aeroméxico Flight 498, a Douglas DC-9, approaching Los Angeles International Airport was struck by a light aircraft. Both aircraft then fell to earth in the Los Angeles suburb of Cerritos, California. All 64 passengers and crew on board the DC-9-32 were killed, as were the three people in the light aircraft and 15 people on the ground. After three years and a long trial, the aircraft's crew and the airline were found not to blame. This was because the pilot of the Piper had strayed into an air traffic control zone reserved for commercial flights. That same year, the airline acquired the charter carrier GATSA and used it for charter operations until December. In April 1988, the state-owned company was declared bankrupt and grounded for three months because of lack of organization, a fleet with an average of 20 years without a renovation plan and a depreciating administration by the Mexican Government. In August, a privatization program was underway. This involved retiring the eight Douglas DC-8s along with the remaining ten DC-9-15 aircraft. After a strike and bankruptcy between April and May 1988, a privatization process started and included a new corporate name (Aerovias de Mexico SA de CV). The airline restarted operations with some of its predecessor's assets, including the headquarters building, maintenance hangar, some aircraft, and some former Aeronaves de Mexico employees.

=== 1990s ===
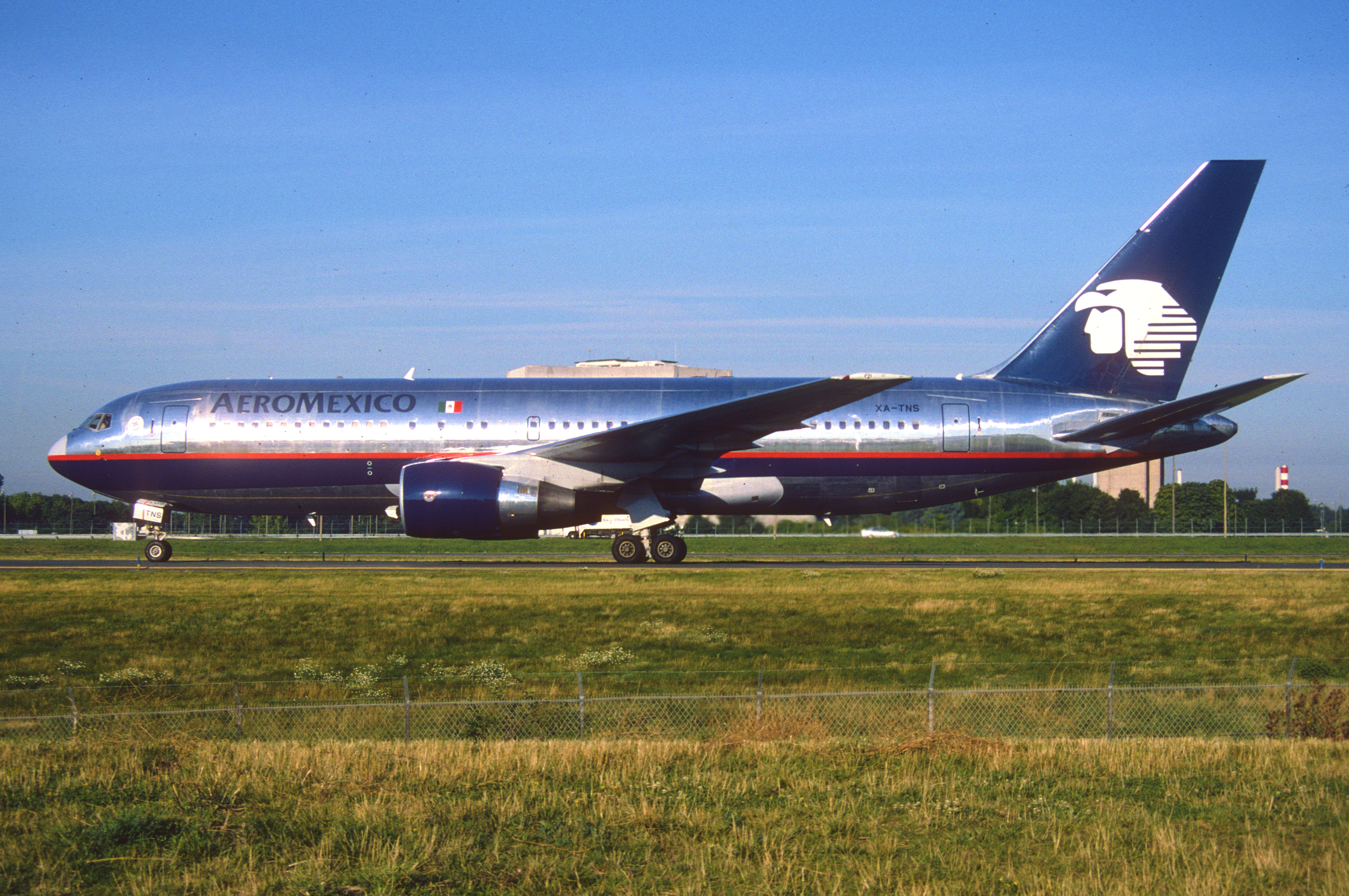
Boeing 767-200ER at Paris-Charles de Gaulle Airport in 2001.

The early 1990s were turbulent times, with the rise in fuel costs due to the Gulf War, and a domestic fare war caused by start-up airlines like TAESA, Servicios Aéreos Rutas Oriente, Aviacsa, among others, as well as constant labor problems. In April 1991, the first two 767-200ERs were introduced to the fleet to replace DC-10s in services to Europe, New York, and Tijuana, and another two 767-300ERs joined the fleet later that year. This was all a part of a renovation and expansion program to introduce 24 direct flights to Madrid and Paris from Mexico City with Boeing 767s as well as services to Frankfurt via Paris and Rome via Madrid.

In 1992, Grupo Aeroméxico was among other investors that failed to consummate the acquisition of Continental Airlines. After failing to invest in Continental, Aeroméxico acquired the bankrupt Aeroperú from the Peruvian government.

In 1993, Aeroméxico Group took over Mexicana, the second-largest airline in the Mexican market, under the same management. There was a great dispute in June 1993 with the pilot union regarding the transfer of flights to regional subsidiary Aeromonterrey, which had non-union pilots. Between 1994 and 1995, the six DC-10 aircraft in the fleet were finally retired. Their last revenue flight was in 1995.

In December 1994, three weeks after Carlos Salinas de Gortari left the office, the first of several devaluations in the next 18 months started, giving way to the Mexican peso crisis. As a consequence, Aeroméxico had to cut capacity, and flights to Frankfurt and Rome were canceled; four McDonnell Douglas MD-80s and four Boeing 767s were returned to their lessors, early retirement for pilots and other staff was underway, and a new Boeing 767 due for delivery in April 1995 was instead transferred to another airline. Flights to Madrid and Paris were operated only by two Boeing 767-300ER jets.

In 1996, Cintra was created to prevent the two main carriers from going bankrupt. Some Boeing 757s of Aeroméxico's original renovation program were transferred to Mexicana and Aeroperú. The market and the airline recovered between 1996 and 1998; eight McDonnell Douglas MD80s were leased back along with two Boeing 767-200ERs.

The sale of Grupo Cintra was scheduled after several delays in September 1999, and with the looming presidential elections in 2000, everything was delayed once again. The ruling party lost the election after 70 years in office and all the policies changed. Due to the recession in 2000, the new government put everything on hold, waiting for better economic conditions to start the stock sell-off, and just when everything was about to start, the 11 September 2001 attacks occurred, and nothing materialized since the two main carriers, Mexicana and Aeroméxico, were losing large amounts of money.

=== 2000s ===
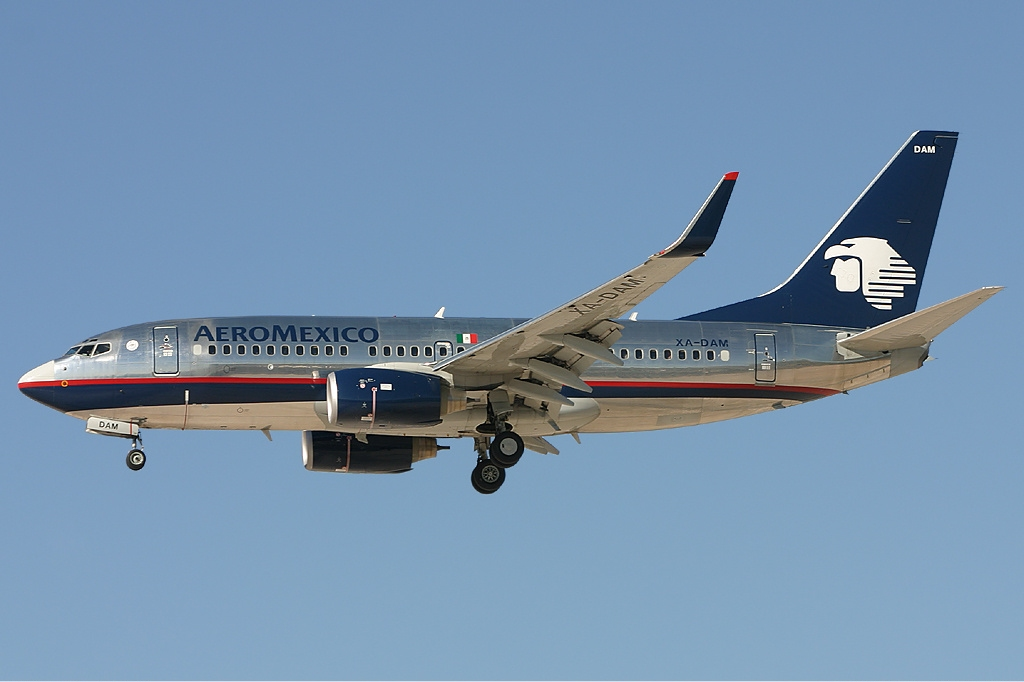
Boeing 737-700 in 2004.

Between 2000 and 2005, Aeroméxico had an average fleet of 60 aircraft in mainline operation, plus 20 in Aerolitoral, as well as five CEOs during this time. On 22 June 2000, the airline, along with Air France, Delta, and Korean Air, founded the SkyTeam global airline alliance. After 9/11 and the Iraq War, it pursued a fleet renovation program. In 2003, the airline acquired its first Boeing 737-700 instead of the Boeing 717 as a replacement for its aging DC-9 aircraft. On 29 March 2006, Aeroméxico CEO Andrés Conesa announced the inauguration of direct flights between Japan and Mexico City via Tijuana. This was after the purchase of two Boeing 777-200ERs, making Aeroméxico the third airline in Latin America to fly regularly to Asia, after Varig and the now-defunct VASP. Since Varig's demise, Aeroméxico is currently the only airline with this service. Aeroméxico resumed its Mexico City-Tijuana-Shanghai route twice a week as of 30 March 2010. Suspension of this flight was due to the 2009 flu pandemic.

On 29 June 2006, the International Lease Finance Corporation (ILFC) and Aeroméxico announced that the airline would operate three Boeing 787 Dreamliners. Aeroméxico's deliveries were scheduled to begin in early 2012. From 2006, Consorcio Aeroméxico S.A. de C.V., the parent company of Aeroméxico at the time, faced large debts and had no profits to pay them off, so it offered Aeroméxico for sale in 2007. In early October, a week-long auction was held, with Grupo Financiero Banamex, a unit of Citigroup, competing against the Saba family. On 17 October 2007, Banamex offered the highest bid and purchased the airline for US$249.1 million. In October 2010, Aeroméxico's largest competitor, Mexicana de Aviacion, filed for bankruptcy and was placed in administration.

=== 2010s ===
==== Delta/Aeroméxico alliance ====
In 2011, Delta Air Lines and Aeroméxico signed an enhanced commercial alliance, building on an original agreement from 1994. The 2011 agreement provided for codesharing on all the carriers' Mexico–US flights; Delta investing US$65 million in Aeroméxico shares, and Delta gaining a seat on the Aeroméxico board of directors.

- In March 2014, the airlines opened Tech Ops Mexico, a US$55 million joint maintenance, repair, and overhaul facility in Queretaro City, Mexico.
- In March 2015, the airlines filed applications for antitrust immunity, a first step in the creation of a US$1.5 billion joint cooperation agreement (JCA) that will allow Delta and Aeroméxico to jointly sell, and share costs and profits on all Mexico–U.S. routes.
- In May 2015, Mexican regulators approved the JCA; and in the same month, the Mexican Senate approved Open Skies between the U.S. and Mexico.
- In November 2016, the DOT approved the joint venture under strict conditions that the airlines give up slots in both Mexico City and New York-JFK.
- In December 2016, the two airlines made the final agreement to go forward with the JV and antitrust immunity was granted.
- In February 2017, Delta announced an offer to acquire additional shares of Aeroméxico, up to 49%.
- On 8 May 2017, the joint commercial agreement went into effect, whereby the airlines share information and jointly determine routes and pricing on all U.S.-Mexico flights, and share costs and profits.

==== Dreamliners ====
On 25 July 2012, Aeroméxico CEO Andrés Conesa announced the purchase of six Boeing 787-9 Dreamliners. The new order was added to the package of 20 aircraft that the company had announced in 2011 and nine more Boeing 787-8 Dreamliners already provided. The delivery of the Dreamliners began in the summer of 2013. The total investment is US$11 billion and includes the acquisition of 90 Boeing 737 MAX 8s, which began delivering from 2018. The airline took delivery of its first Boeing 787-8 Dreamliner (sourced from the ILFC order book) in early August 2013 and officially launched commercial service on 1 October 2013. Between 2013 and 2015, the remaining eight were delivered (seven leased and two owned by Aeroméxico outright).

In September 2016, Aeroméxico received its first Boeing 787-9 Dreamliner. This particular frame, registered XA-ADL, is named after and painted in a unique commemorating Quetzalcoatl, a major figure in Aztec culture of pre-Hispanic Mexico, as the result of a "Design in the Air" competition hosted by the airline inviting students at select universities in Mexico to submit a potential design to be painted on the airframe.

==== Branded fares ====
In February 2018, Aeroméxico introduced a new branded fares structure, which included a new Basic fare that did not contain a checked luggage allowance, nor did it allow for seat assignments, upgrades, or changes.

=== 2020 ===
==== Bankruptcy ====
The COVID-19 pandemic deeply affected the global aviation industry, including Aeroméxico. Aeroméxico's stock dropped during first half of 2020 and rumors about bankruptcy spread. On June 30, Aeroméxico voluntarily filed for Chapter 11 bankruptcy in the United States. However, day-to-day operations continued as the company restructured. Existing tickets were honored and employees continued to be paid as usual.

On July 1, 2021, shareholder Delta Air Lines announced it would purchase $185 million of the Mexican airline's Chapter 11 debt.

On August 28, 2024, Aeroméxico unveiled a new livery in celebration of the airline's 90th anniversary.

== Corporate affairs ==
=== Headquarters ===
Its headquarters are in Colonia Cuauhtémoc, Cuauhtémoc Borough, Mexico City.

=== Subsidiaries ===
- Aeroméxico Connect, formerly Aerolitoral, a regional airline based at Monterrey International Airport

==== Former subsidiaries ====
- Aeroméxico Express was a commuter airline based at Monterrey International Airport. It was a partnership between Aeroméxico and Aeromar. It ceased to exist in June 2016 when the two wet-leased ATR 72-600 it used to operate its routes were returned to Aeromar.
- Aeroméxico Contigo, Aeroméxico's brand for select U.S.-Mexico flights
- Aerovias Guest
- Aeroperú, Peru's national flag carrier based in Lima International Airport
- Mexicana, from 1993 to 1995
- Aeromexpress, a cargo handler based at Mexico City International Airport in Mexico City
- Aeroméxico Travel, a charter airline based in Cancún International Airport

=== Corporate Image ===
- 1960s–1970s – Mexico's largest airline
- 1990s – La línea aérea mas puntual del mundo.
- Before 2009 – Travel the world (Vamos por el mundo)
- 2010–2012 – A donde te lleven tus sueños.
- 2012–2013 – Nunca nos detenemos.
- 2013–present – La línea que nos une.
- 2016–present – La línea de los Mexicanos y del mundo.
- English slogan: "Mexico's Global Airline"

=== Technology ===
In 2016, Aeroméxico added 2Ku WiFi service by Gogo to some 737-800 aircraft, including access to Netflix. On its Dreamliners, it added Panasonic broadband Internet, and on Embraer narrow-body aircraft, streaming entertainment via Gogo's Gogo Vision.

In July 2016, the airline launched a completely new website and new check-in kiosks at Mexico City Airport. That same year, the airline also co-sponsored the launch of startup accelerator MassChallenge in Mexico.

In August 2017, the company became the Mexico launch customers of digital agency MediaMonks and together, they released a new mobile app.

=== Racism ===
Aeroméxico has been accused of racist behavior, with allegations including removing passengers from planes because they were Indigenous. Most complaints of discrimination against the airline have been reported as being due to skin color or ethnic origin. In May 2022, Aeroméxico prevented Nahuatl film maker David Cayetano from boarding a plane to Australia, where he was to present his film "Tsontiajakatl, el último viento" (Tsontiajakatl, the Last Wind). Aeroméxico falsely claimed that Cayetano did not have the required vaccines, leading to accusations that he was instead prevented from flying due to his indigenous ethnicity. A significant number of complaints emerged in August 2022 after a video of indigenous family being removed from a flight was shared on social media. The father of the family claimed he was removed "because of his appearance", though that cannot be heard in the video. Aeroméxico did not comment on the incident.

=== Chat platform ===
In September 2016, Aeroméxico became the first airline in the Americas to launch a chatbot, that enables customers to search, track and book flights interacting with a virtual assistant on Facebook Messenger. During the Facebook F8 conference in April 2017, the airline earned praise from Facebook for being among the first companies worldwide to launch the Chat Extension function, allowing users to pull up Aerobot during a group chat. It also launched the ability to ask any question, using artificial intelligence and natural language processing techniques to match the questions with answers.

In September 2017, Aeroméxico announced that it would be among the first companies worldwide to start services on WhatsApp's new Enterprise solution – the first time large companies would be able to provide customer service to users at scale. In February 2018, the company announced development of further features together with its partner Yalochat, such as purchase confirmation and flight notifications via WhatsApp, and deepening the artificial intelligence used on its chat platform.

== Destinations ==
=== New destinations ===
In an attempt to gain more worldwide presence and strengthen its network and to make connections easier and more frequent, Aeroméxico entered new international markets. In 2006, it started operations to Tokyo from Mexico City via Tijuana. Service to Shanghai from Mexico City via Tijuana began in May 2008. New destinations in 2015–2016 included Panama City (Panama), Santo Domingo, Vancouver, Toronto, Boston, Medellín, Amsterdam, Cozumel, and Austin (Texas). The airline launched service to Seoul from Mexico City (with a stop in Monterrey only on the outbound flight) on 1 July 2017.

In the first year of the Delta–Aeroméxico joint venture (June 2017–June 2018) the companies worked to enhance connectivity between Mexico and the U.S., and launched new Aeroméxico or Delta flights, or additional frequencies, on Los Angeles–Cabo San Lucas, New York JFK–Cancun, Detroit–León, Atlanta–Mérida, Seattle–Mexico City, Atlanta–Querétaro, Atlanta–León, Portland–Mexico City, Los Angeles–Leon, Atlanta–Guadalajara, and Guadalajara–Salt Lake City.

In 2023, Aeroméxico resumed flights to Rome and in June 2024 to Barcelona.

=== Codeshare agreements ===
Aeroméxico codeshares with the following airlines:

- Aerolíneas Argentinas
- Air Europa
- Air France
- Avianca
- China Airlines
- China Eastern Airlines
- Delta Air Lines (joint venture partner)
- El Al
- Garuda Indonesia
- Gol Linhas Aéreas Inteligentes
- ITA Airways
- Japan Airlines
- Kenya Airways
- KLM
- Korean Air
- LATAM
- Middle East Airlines
- Saudia
- Scandinavian Airlines
- TAROM
- Vietnam Airlines
- Virgin Atlantic
- WestJet
- XiamenAir

=== Interline agreements ===
Aeroméxico has an interline agreement with the following airline:

- My Freighter Airlines

== Fleet ==
Boeing 787-8

Boeing 787-9 Dreamliner in special Quetzalcoatl livery

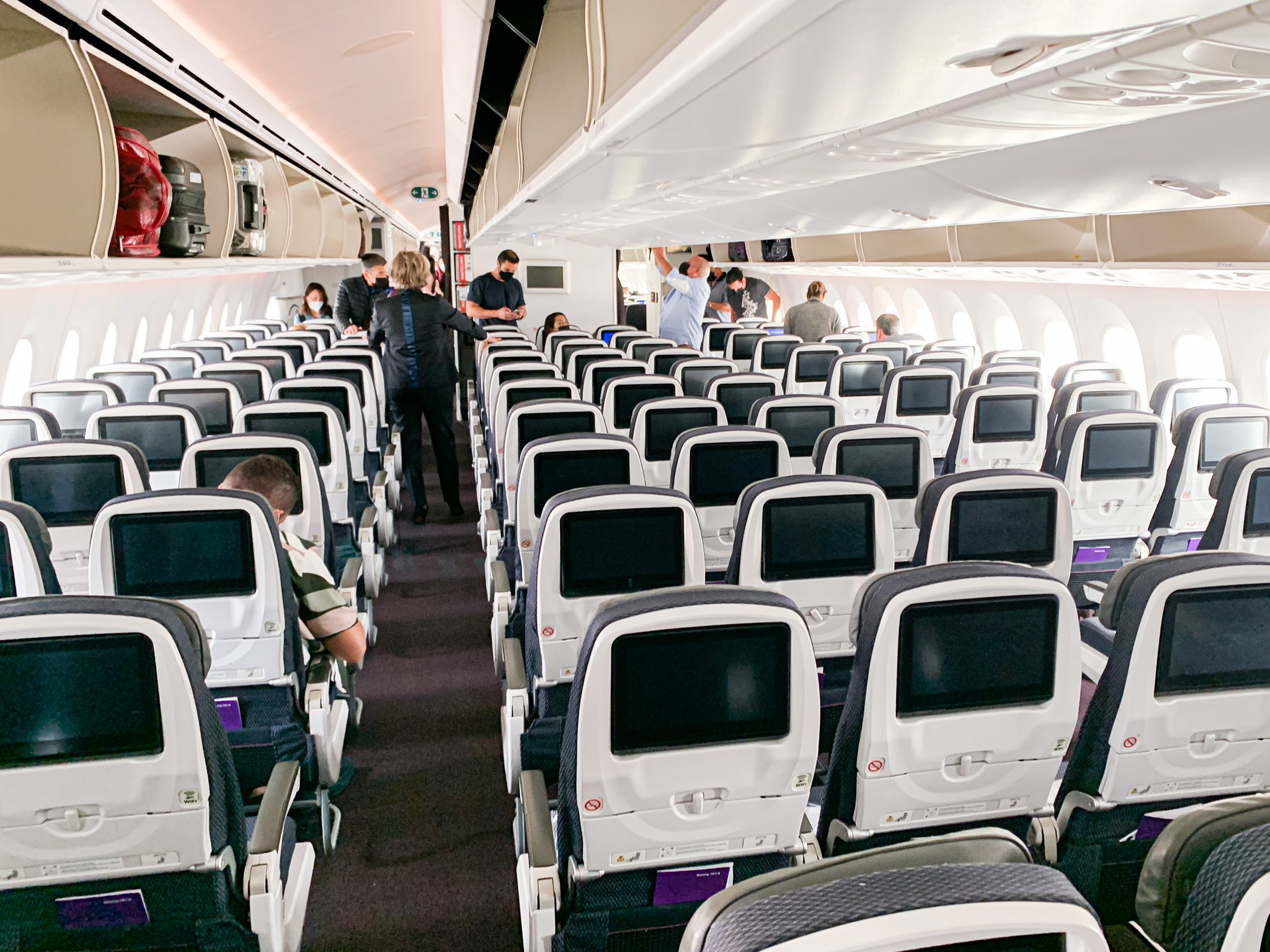
Boeing 787-9 economy class cabin.

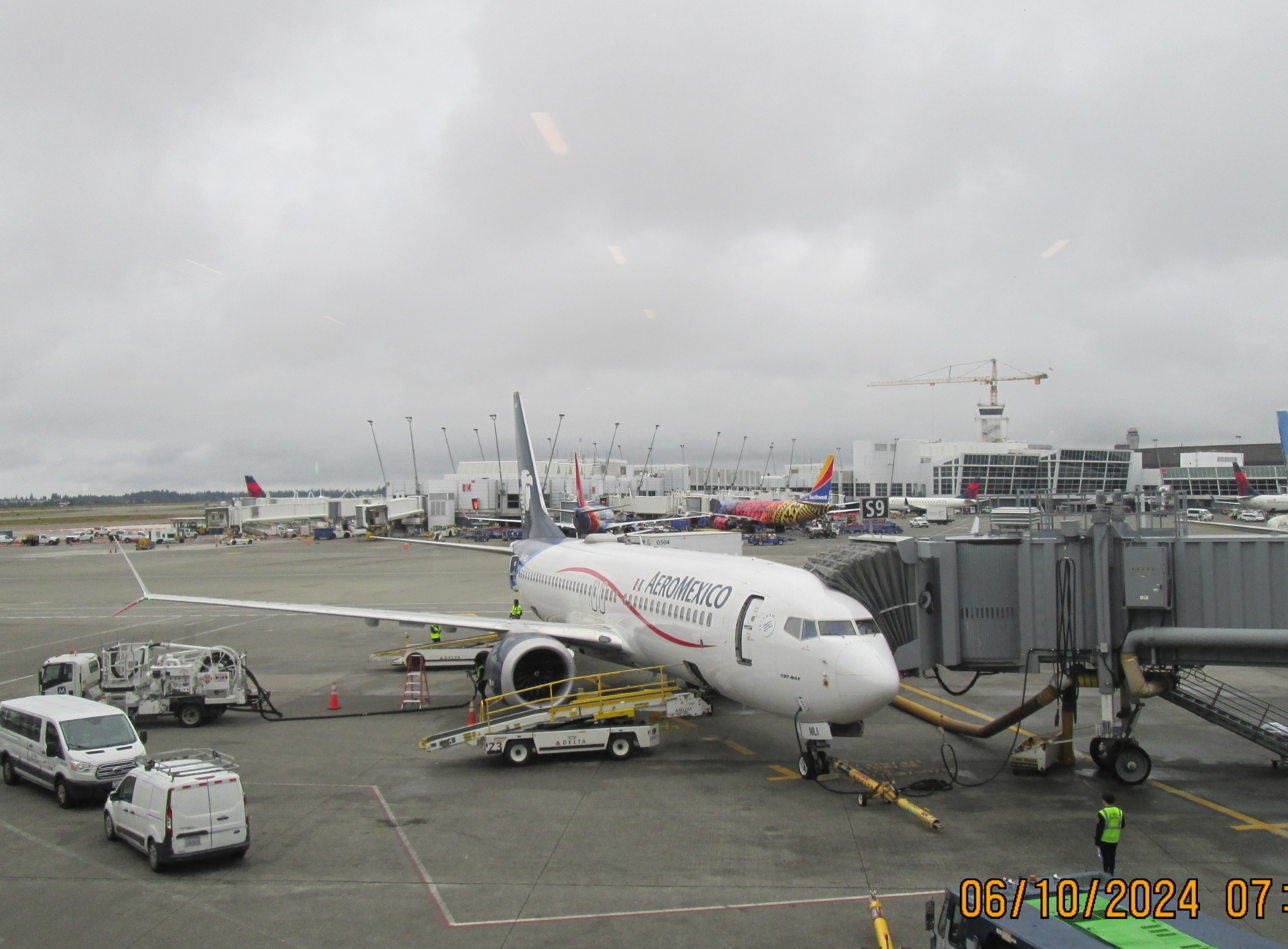
A Boeing 737 MAX 8.

=== Current fleet ===
As of October 2026, Aeroméxico operates an all-Boeing fleet composed of the following aircraft:

Aircraft	In service	Orders	Passengers				Notes
Aircraft	In service	Orders	J	Y+	Y	Total	Notes
Boeing 737-800	34	—	16	18	126	160	
Boeing 737 MAX 8	47	—	16	18	132	166	
Boeing 737 MAX 9	30	—	16	18	147	181	
Boeing 787-8	8	—	32	27	184	243	
Boeing 787-9	17	—	36	—	238	274	One aircraft (XA-ADL) in Quetzalcoatl special livery.
Total	136	—					

Not included is the fleet of subsidiary Aeroméxico Connect.

=== Former fleet ===
Aeroméxico also formerly operated the following aircraft types:

- Avro Anson
- Bellanca CH-300 Pacemaker
- Boeing 247D
- Boeing 707 (leased from Sabena)
- Boeing 737-700
- Boeing 757-200
- Boeing 767-200ER
- Boeing 767-300ER
- Boeing 777-200ER
- Bristol Britannia
- Convair 340
- Douglas DC-2
- Douglas DC-3
- Douglas DC-4
- Douglas DC-6
- Douglas DC-8
- Lockheed L-049 Constellation
- McDonnell Douglas DC-9-15
- McDonnell Douglas DC-9-30
- McDonnell Douglas DC-10-15
- McDonnell Douglas DC-10-30
- McDonnell Douglas MD-82
- McDonnell Douglas MD-83
- McDonnell Douglas MD-87
- McDonnell Douglas MD-88
- Stinson SR

== Accidents, incidents and hijackings ==
=== Aeronaves de México ===
- 26 March 1954 near Monterrey, Mexico – XA-GUN a Douglas DC-3
- 2 June 1958 near Guadalajara, Mexico – XA-MEV, a Lockheed L-749A Constellation operating as Flight 111, crashed into La Latilla Mountain, 16 kilometers (10 miles) from Guadalajara Airport, shortly after takeoff for a flight to Mexico City after the airliner's crew failed to follow the established climb-out procedure for Guadalajara Airport. All 45 people on board died, including two prominent American scientists: oceanographer Townsend Cromwell and fisheries scientist Bell M. Shimada. It was the deadliest aviation accident in Mexican history at the time.
- 19 January 1961 in New York City (Idlewild), USA – Flight 401 a Douglas DC-8-21
- 13 August 1966 near Acapulco, Mexico – XA-PEI a Douglas DC-8-51
- 24 December 1966 Lake Texcoco, Mexico – XA-NUS a Douglas DC-8-51
- 12 June 1967 near La Paz, BCS, Mexico – XA-FUW a Douglas DC-3A

=== Aerovías de México (Aeroméxico) ===
- On 20 June 1973, Douglas DC-9-15 XA-SOC near Puerto Vallarta, Mexico, Aeroméxico Flight 229, a daily service from George Bush Intercontinental Airport to Licenciado Gustavo Díaz Ordaz International Airport, crashed into the side of a mountain while on approach. All 27 people on board died.
- On 2 September 1976, Douglas DC-9-15 XA-SOF operating as Aeroméxico Flight 152 overran the runway at León, Guanajuato-Del Bajío Airport where it was damaged beyond repair. No injuries were reported.
- On 11 November 1979, an Aeroméxico DC-10, named "Castillo de Chapultepec" and operating as Aeroméxico Flight 945 from Frankfurt to Mexico City, with a stop-over in Miami, experienced trouble over Luxembourg. The airplane lost almost 12,000 feet (3,700 m) of altitude, beginning at 29,800 feet (9,100 m) and ending at about 18,000 feet (5,500 m). The crew at first wanted to divert to Madrid but decided to continue the flight to Miami instead. The plane landed in Miami without further incident but upon de-boarding it, crews discovered that a portion of the outboard elevators and of the lower fuselage tail area maintenance access door had fallen off during the flight. There were no injuries to the 311 passengers and crew on board.

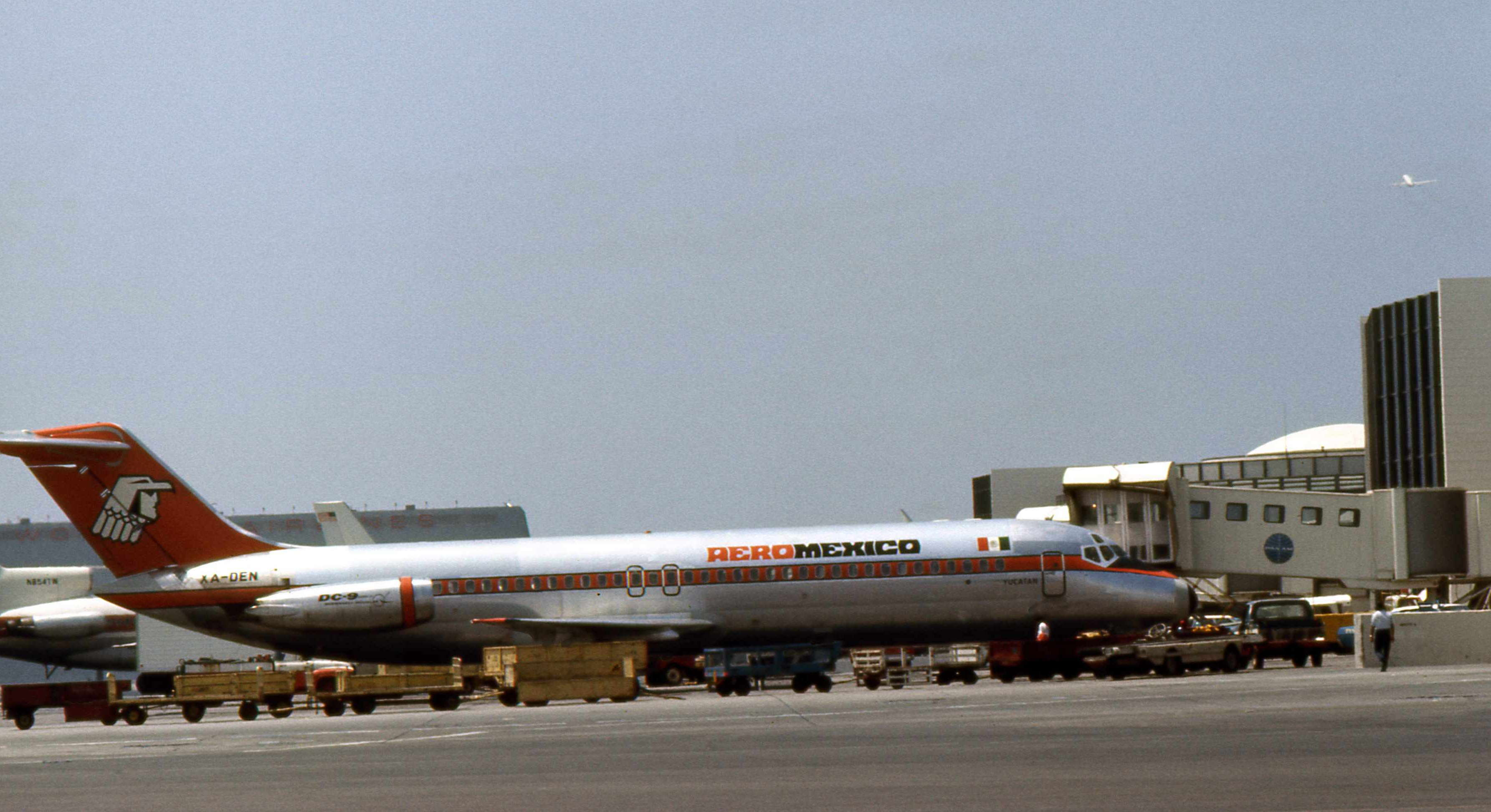
The DC-9 that crashed as Flight 230 at Chihuahua International Airport in 1981.

- On 27 July 1981, Aeroméxico Flight 230 XA-DEN, a Douglas DC-9-32, crashed while landing in Chihuahua. 32 of the 66 people on board died.
- On 8 November 1981, XA-DEO, a Douglas DC-9-32 flying from Acapulco to Guadalajara crashed in the mountains of the state of Guerrero.
- On 31 August 1986, Aeroméxico Flight 498, operated with a McDonnell Douglas DC-9-32, was on its final approach into Los Angeles International Airport, United States, when it collided with a Piper PA-28 Archer over Cerritos, California. All 67 people on both aircraft died, and 15 people on the ground in Cerritos died.
- On 6 October 2000, Aeroméxico Flight 250 N936ML, a Douglas DC-9-31, overran the runway at General Lucio Blanco International Airport, Reynosa, Mexico. 4 people on the ground died.
- On 9 September 2009, Aeroméxico Flight 576 was hijacked between Cancún and Mexico City. The hijacking ended in Mexico City with no casualties.
- On 20 May 2017, Aeroméxico Flight 642, a Boeing 737-800, collided with a utility truck at Los Angeles International Airport, injuring eight people, two of them seriously.
- On 31 July 2018, Aeroméxico Connect Flight 2431 crashed on takeoff from Durango International Airport. Shortly after becoming airborne, the plane encountered sudden wind shear caused by a microburst. The plane rapidly lost speed and altitude and impacted the runway, detaching the engines and skidding to a halt about 1,000 feet (300 m) beyond the runway. The plane caught fire and was destroyed. All 103 people on board survived, but 39 passengers and crew members were injured.
- On 5 January 2023, Aeroméxico Connect Flight 165 operated with an Embraer 190, registration code XA-ALW, aborted takeoff from Culiacán International Airport after being hit by a bullet. The projectile impacted the lower part of the empennage, below the horizontal stabilizer, causing a hydraulic systems failure in the aircraft. Passengers and cabin crew were uninjured. The bullet was shot during a series of clashes between Mexican Armed Forces and criminal groups in the surroundings of the airport, after a drug cartel leader was captured by Mexican authorities. In the same fashion, two Mexican Air Force airplanes, a Boeing 737-800 and a CASA C-295, which were in the airport were damaged.

== See also ==
- Airports and air travel in Mexico
- List of companies of Mexico
- Transportation in Mexico
- List of active mexican airlines
- Lists of airlines
