= Aerovias Guest =

Mexican airline, 1946–1963

IATA	ICAO	Call sign
—	AVG	GUEST
- Founded: August 1946; 80 years ago
- Ceased operations: 1963; 63 years ago (merged with Aeronaves de Mexico)
- Hubs: Mexico City International Airport
- Fleet size: 8
- Destinations: 9
- Headquarters: Mexico City
- Key people: Winston Guest

Aerovias Guest S.A. was Mexico's third airline founded after Mexicana de Aviación and Aeronaves de Mexico. It was later taken over by Aeronaves de Mexico when it declared bankruptcy. It used the tagline "The route of the sun!"

== History ==
Aerovias Guest was founded in June 1946. In the 1950s, the airline began an international partnership with Scandinavian Airlines (SAS) after SAS purchased a share of the airline. The airline's name was later changed to Guest Aerovias Mexico. SAS sold its share of the airline in 1961.

In early 1963, the airline flying as Guest Aerovias Mexico was operating daily nonstop Douglas DC-8 jet service between Mexico City and New York City as well as nonstop DC-8 flights four days a week between Mexico City and Miami and was also flying de Havilland Comet 4C jet service twice a week on Mexico City - Guatemala - Panama City - Caracas and Mexico City - Guatemala - Panama City - Bogota routings. Aerovias Guest was then taken over by Aeronaves de Mexico later in 1963 and the company name was retired.

== Destinations ==
At different times, Aerovias Guest flew to the following destinations:

- Bermuda, United Kingdom
- Boston, USA
- Caracas, Venezuela
- Havana, Cuba
- Jacksonville, USA
- Lisbon, Portugal
- Madrid, Spain
- Mexico City, Mexico (base)
- Miami, USA
- New York City, USA
- Panama City, Panama
- Paris, France
- Windsor, Canada

== Fleet ==
The fleet of Aerovias Guest consisted of the following aircraft:

- 2 de Havilland Comet 4C
- 6 Douglas C-54 Skymaster
- 4 Douglas DC-6
- ? Douglas DC-8C
- 3 Lockheed L-749 Constellation
- 2 Lockheed L-1049G Constellation
