= Aeroméxico Flight 229 =

1973 aviation accident in Mexico

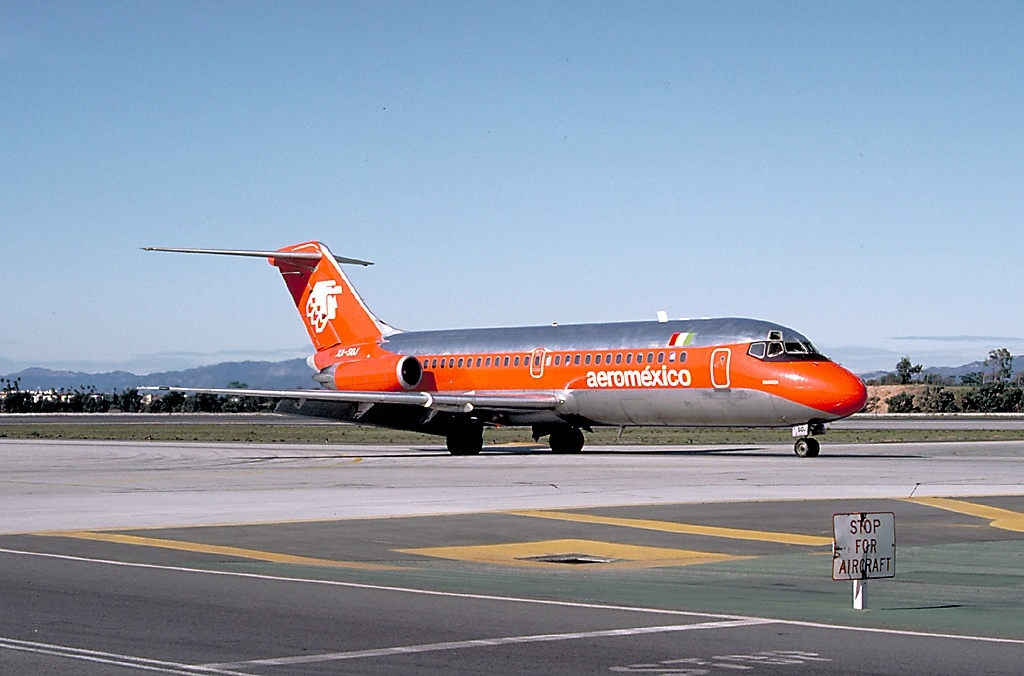
- An Aeroméxico DC-9-15, similar to the accident aircraft.

Accident
- Date: 20 June 1973
- Summary: Controlled flight into terrain
- Site: Near Licenciado Gustavo Díaz Ordaz International Airport, Puerto Vallarta, Jalisco, Mexico; 20.494986°N 105.014398°W

Aircraft
- Aircraft type: McDonnell Douglas DC-9-15
- Aircraft name: Coahuila
- Operator: Aeroméxico
- IATA flight No.: AM229
- ICAO flight No.: AMX229
- Call sign: AEROMEXICO 229
- Registration: XA-SOC
- Flight origin: Houston-Intercontinental Airport
- 1st stopover: Monterrey International Airport
- Last stopover: Licenciado Gustavo Díaz Ordaz International Airport
- Destination: Mexico City International Airport
- Occupants: 27
- Passengers: 22
- Crew: 5
- Fatalities: 27
- Survivors: 0

Aeroméxico Flight 229 was a McDonnell Douglas DC-9 that crashed into the side of a mountain while on approach to Licenciado Gustavo Díaz Ordaz International Airport in Puerto Vallarta, Mexico, on 20 June 1973. There were no survivors among the 27 passengers and crew.

== Accident ==
The accident aircraft was on a passenger flight from Houston-Intercontinental Airport (now George Bush Intercontinental Airport) in Houston, Texas to Mexico City International Airport via Monterrey International Airport in Monterrey, Mexico, and Licenciado Gustavo Díaz Ordaz International Airport in Puerto Vallarta. The aircraft was nearing Licenciado Gustavo Díaz Ordaz airport when the flight was cleared for approach and landing on runway 04. At 22:47, during the approach, the aircraft flew into the side of Las Minas Mountain, 20 miles (32 km) SSE of the Puerto Vallarta airport. The aircraft broke up and caught fire, killing all 27 passengers and crew. Alejandro Rojano, the air traffic controller on duty, reported the aircraft missing to the main offices of RAMSA in Mexico City at 22:50. Following an investigation, it was determined that the pilot had failed to sufficiently reduce the aircraft's speed during the descent procedure.

== See also ==
- Prinair Flight 277
- Controlled flight into terrain
