= Aeroméxico Flight 110 =

1981 aviation accident in Mexico

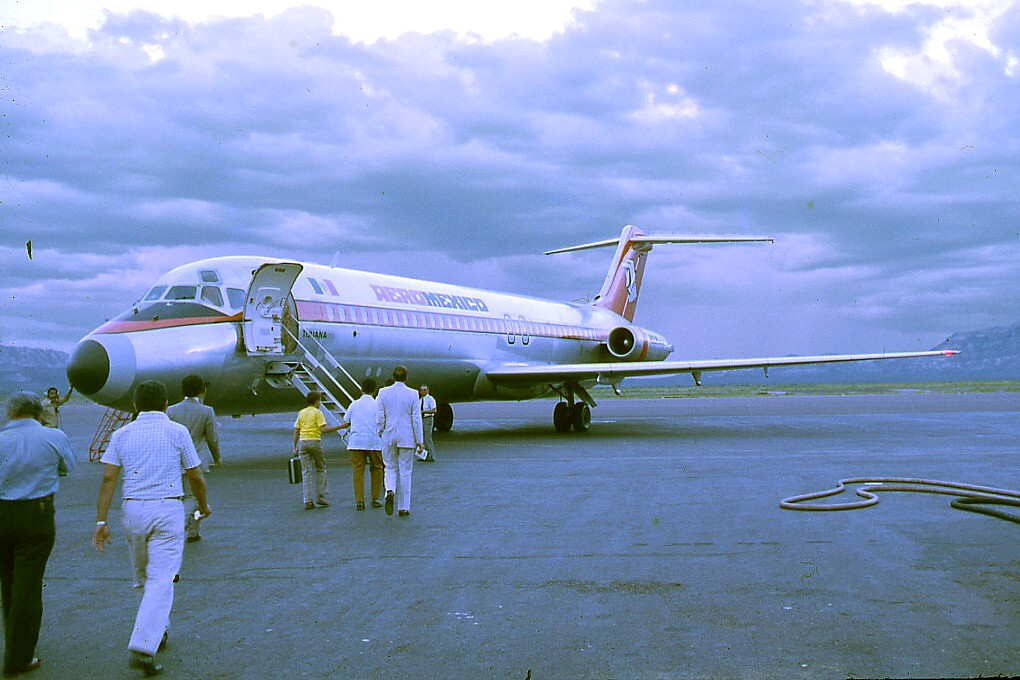
- XA-DEO, the aircraft involved in the accident, pictured in 1976

Accident
- Date: 8 November 1981
- Summary: Controlled flight into terrain due to pilot error, following cabin depressurization of unknown cause
- Site: Sierra de Guerro, 65 km east of Zihuatanejo, Mexico; 17.653247°N 100.954056°W

Aircraft
- Aircraft type: McDonnell Douglas DC-9-32
- Aircraft name: Tijuana
- Operator: Aeroméxico
- IATA flight No.: AM110
- ICAO flight No.: AMX110
- Call sign: AEROMEXICO 110
- Registration: XA-DEO
- Flight origin: Acapulco International Airport, Acapulco, Mexico
- Destination: Guadalajara International Airport, Guadalajara, Mexico
- Passengers: 12
- Crew: 6
- Fatalities: 18
- Survivors: 0

Aeroméxico Flight 110 was a scheduled passenger flight from Acapulco to Guadalajara. On November 8, 1981, the McDonnell Douglas DC-9 Tijuana, registered as XA-DEO, experienced a cabin decompression and crashed into the mountains near Zihuatanejo, Guerrero while initiating an emergency descent. All 12 passengers and 6 crew members on board were killed in the crash.

== Aircraft ==
The aircraft involved was a McDonnell Douglas DC-9-32 with MSN number 47622/753, and was named Tijuana by Aeroméxico. The aircraft was manufactured in 1974 and later delivered to Aeroméxico by 1976.

== Accident ==
The flight departed General Juan N. Álvarez International Airport in Acapulco, Guerrero, and was scheduled to arrive at Miguel Hidalgo y Costilla International Airport in Guadalajara, Jalisco. Approximately 35 minutes after takeoff, while cruising at 31,000 feet (9,400 m), the captain reported to air traffic control that the aircraft's cabin had depressurized and requested to return to Acapulco for an emergency landing. The aircraft was cleared by ATC and initiated an emergency descent; several minutes after beginning the descent, at an altitude of 6,000 feet (1,800 m), the aircraft crashed into a mountain slope in the Sierra de Guerrero mountain range, destroying the aircraft. All 18 people onboard were killed.

== Investigation ==
The investigation determined that the crew had failed to follow proper emergency procedures.
