= Aeronaves de México Flight 401 =

1961 aircraft accident in New York

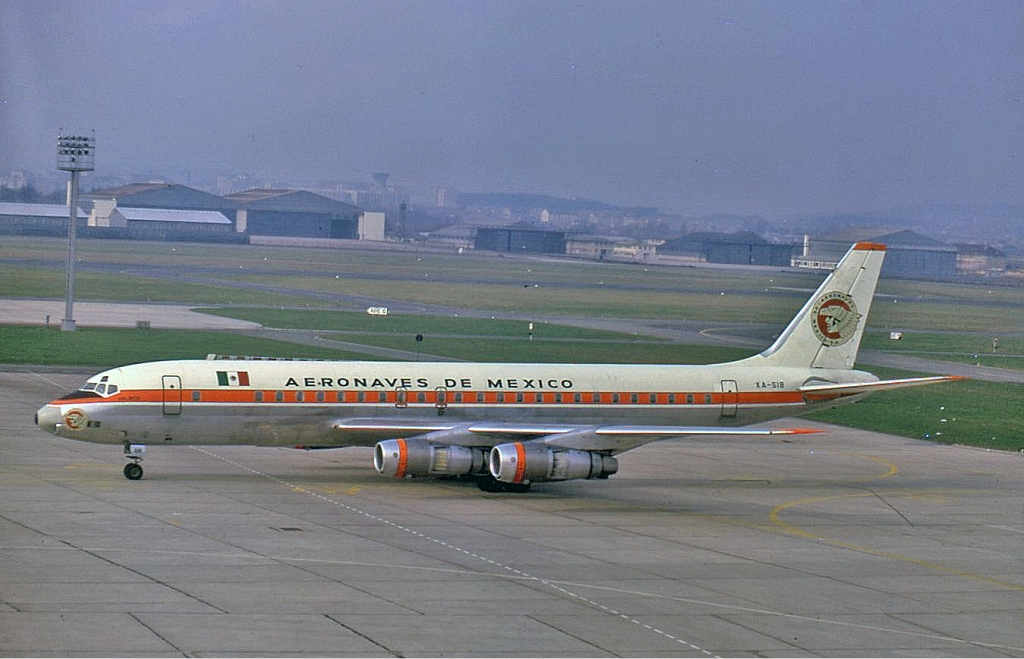
- An Aeronaves de México DC-8, similar to the accident aircraft

Accident
- Date: January 19, 1961
- Summary: Runway overrun after aborted takeoff, pilot error
- Site: New York Idlewild International Airport, New York, United States

Aircraft
- Aircraft type: Douglas DC-8-21
- Operator: Aeronaves de México
- Registration: XA-XAX
- Flight origin: New York Idlewild International Airport, New York, United States
- Destination: Mexico City Benito Juárez International Airport, Mexico
- Occupants: 106
- Passengers: 97
- Crew: 9
- Fatalities: 4
- Survivors: 102

Aeronaves de México Flight 401 was an international scheduled flight from New York Idlewild International Airport in New York City to Mexico City. On January 19, 1961, it overran the runway on takeoff as a result of the takeoff being aborted too late, killing four crew members.

== Background ==
=== Aircraft ===
XA-XAX, the aircraft involved, was an approximately six months old Douglas DC-8-21. It was the 105th Douglas DC-8 made. It was being leased to Aeronaves de México by Eastern Air Lines. At the time of the accident it had accumulated 259 flight hours.

=== Crew ===
Captain Ricardo Gonzalez Orduna, age 46, had accumulated 15,210 flight hours. First Officer Antonio Ruiz Bravo, age 32, had accumulated 8,260 flight hours. Second Officer Xavier Alvarez Bacha, age 32, had accumulated 8,143 flight hours. Check Captain Robert Poe, age 53, had accumulated 19,495 flight hours. He was employed by Eastern Air Lines.

== Accident ==
Flight 401 was scheduled to depart 18:30 but was delayed by an hour and a half by the late arrival of the crew and passengers due to weather conditions. The visibility was a quarter of a mile with light snow and fog. At 20:14 the takeoff was commenced from runway 7R. The rotation was quick and abrupt, and according to survivors the plane was airborne for about three seconds. The airspeed dropped from approximately 130 knots to 110 knots. Fearing a stall, Captain Poe decided to abort the takeoff. He unbuckled his seatbelt to stand up and gauge progress down the runway, briefly advanced the throttles (to see if they were working normally) and quickly brought them fully back. Captain Gonzales quickly used reverse thrust and brakes. Captain Poe extended the spoilers. These actions would have taken about 3 seconds. The aircraft overran the 10,000 foot long runway, smashed through a blast fence and caught fire. The aircraft continued onto the Rockaway Boulevard, hitting a car and injuring its driver. Of the four pilots, Captain Poe was the only survivor. A flight attendant also died in the crash.

== Investigation ==
The crash was investigated by the Civil Aeronautics Board. The investigators determined that the cause of the crash was the rejected takeoff by Captain Poe who was seated in the jump seat. Poe had without warning reduced thrust during rotation. He did so because he mistakenly believed that the speed the plane took off on was too low. It could not be determined if ice on the pitot tubes, which measure airspeed, could have caused erroneous readings.
