= Grupo Aeroméxico =

Mexican airline holding company

Grupo Aeroméxico S.A.B. de C.V.
- Formerly: Grupo Aeroméxico S.A. de C.V. (2002–2006)
- Type: Sociedad Anónima Bursátil de Capital Variable
- Traded as: BMV: AERO; NYSE: AERO
- Founded: 2002; 24 years ago
- Headquarters: Cuauhtémoc, Mexico City, Mexico
- Key people: Andrés Conesa (CEO)
- Subsidiaries: Aerovías de México (Aeroméxico); AM DL MRO JV; PLM Premier
- Website: www.aeromexico.com/corporativo-aeromexico

Grupo Aeroméxico S.A.B. de C.V. is an airline holding company headquartered in Mexico City. Grupo Aeroméxico owns and operates Aeroméxico, the principal airline of Mexico.

In June 2022, the company delisted its shares off the Mexican Stock Exchange as a result of its Chapter 11 reorganization plan. It plans to relist on the New York Stock Exchange or Nasdaq by the end of 2024.

== Shareholders ==
- Group of investors of undisclosed percentage − 52%
- Apollo Global Management − 22.4%
- Delta Air Lines − 20% (Formerly 49% prior to the COVID-19 pandemic)
- Banco Actinver Trust — 5.9%

== Major subsidiaries ==
The following is the corporate structure and list of current subsidiaries of Grupo Aeroméxico as of 2023.

- Aeromexpress (Owns 50%)
- Aeroméxico Cargo
- Aerovías de México (Aeroméxico) and subsidiaries
  - Administradora Especializada en Negocios (Adensa) (Owns 99.99%)
  - Aerolitoral (Aeroméxico Connect)
  - Aerosys (Owns 50.01%, other 49.99% owned by Mexicana de Aviación)
  - Aerovías Empresa de Cargo
  - Centro de Capacitación Alas de América (Owns 99.99%)
  - Empresa de Mantenimiento Aéreo
  - Estrategias Especializadas en Negocios (Esensa) (Owns 50%)
  - Fideicomiso Aeroméxico Servicios
  - Fideicomiso F/1748
  - Fundación Aeroméxico (Owns 99.99%)
  - Inmobiliaria Avenida Fuerza Aérea Mexicana 416 (Owns 99.99%)
  - Inmobiliaria Boulevard Aeropuerto 161 (Owns 99.99%)
  - Operadora de Franquicias y Productos Aéreos (Operadora) (Owns 99.99%)
  - Sistemas Integrados de Soporte Terrestre en México (Owns 99.99%)
    - AM Formación Interna
- AM DL MRO JV (Owns 50%, other 50% owned by Delta Air Lines)
- AM BD GP JV (Owns 51%)
- Corporación Nadmin
- Integración y Supervisión de Recursos Corporativos
- PLM Premier (Owns 51.14%)
  - Loyalty Servicios Profesionales Mundiales
- Premier Alliance Services
- Servicios Corporativos Aeroméxico (Owns 99.99%)
- T2 Servicios Aeroportuarios
