= LFV =

LFV may stand for:

- Civil Aviation Administration (Sweden) (Luftfartsverket)
- Liechtenstein Football Association (Liechtensteiner Fussballverband)
- Lorentz force velocimetry, an electromagnetic flow measurement technique
- Lycée Français de Valence, French international school in Spain
- State Office for the Protection of the Constitution, Germany (Landesbehörde für Verfassungsschutz)

== See also ==
- Luftfartsverket (disambiguation)
