= Tower of Paterna =

Coordinates: 39°30′10.27″N 0°26′23.99″W

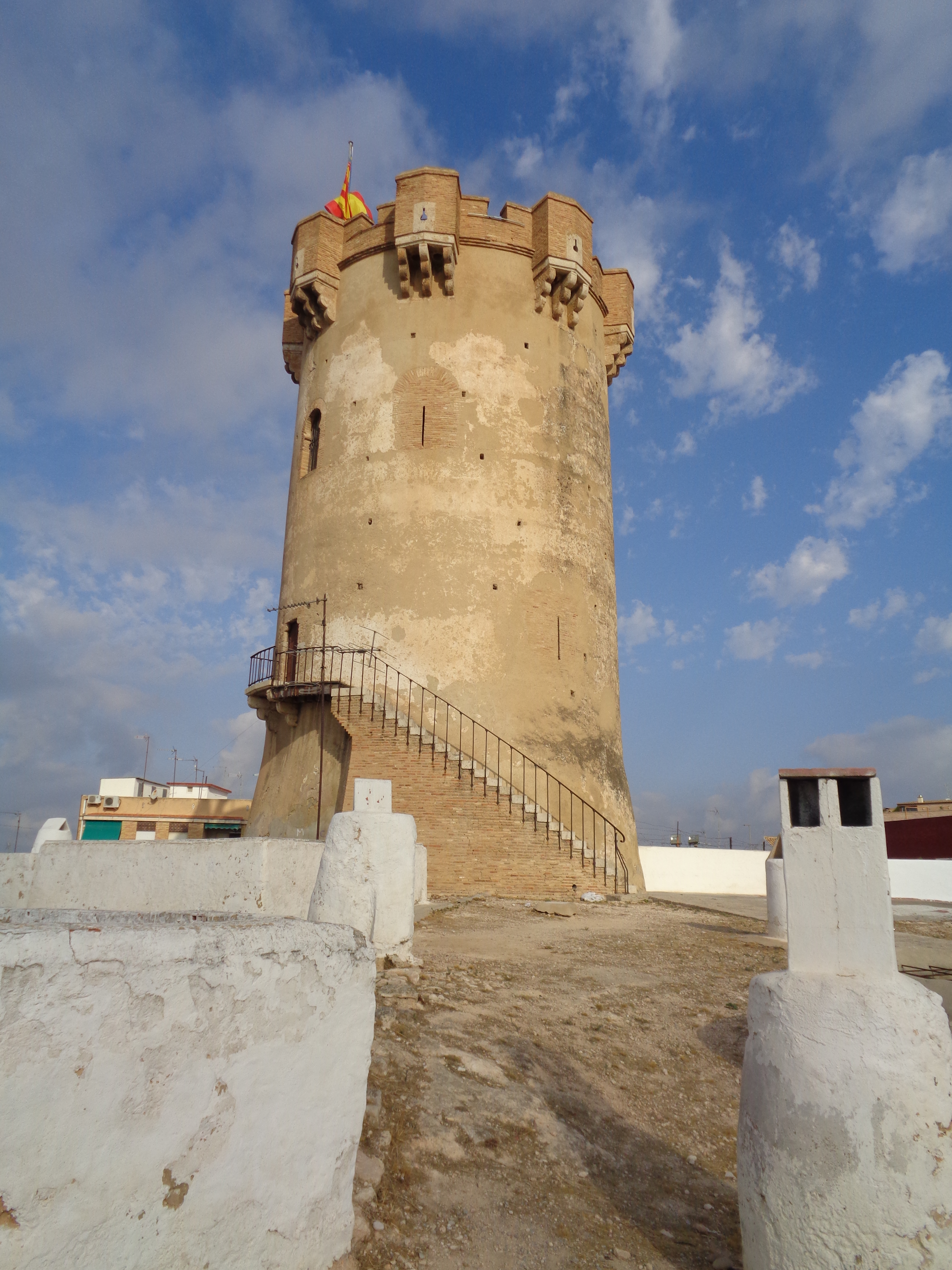
View of the Tower of Paterna

The Tower of Paterna (Valencian: Torre de Paterna [ˈtore ðe paˈtɛɾna]) is a historical monument of the town of Paterna, in the province of Valencia, Spain.

It is the most emblematic monument of this valencian town. The origin of its construction is unknown, but it is thought that it was constructed during the Arab age, as a defense system to protect the city's inhabitants.

Today it is located in an urban park and is surrounded by earth houses excavated on the ground dating from the late 18th and early 19th centuries.

In 1971 it was declared a historic monument of local character and was adequately restored from former deterioration.

== Features ==
Tower of Paterna is shaped like a cone with a height of 19.5 m and a lower diameter of 12.70 m and an upper diameter of 9.60 m. It has three floors and a terrace from where one has a panoramic view of the Huerta de Valencia. The ground floor, which is round, was a cistern. The second floor is square and can be accessed through a door connected to a staircase that runs along the outside wall. The top floor is octagonal and gives access to the terrace through the internal staircase, with bricksteps.

== See also ==
- Paterna
