= Valencia (Senate constituency) =

Senate constituency in Spain

Coordinates: 39°20′N 0°50′W

- Senate of Spain; Electoral constituency
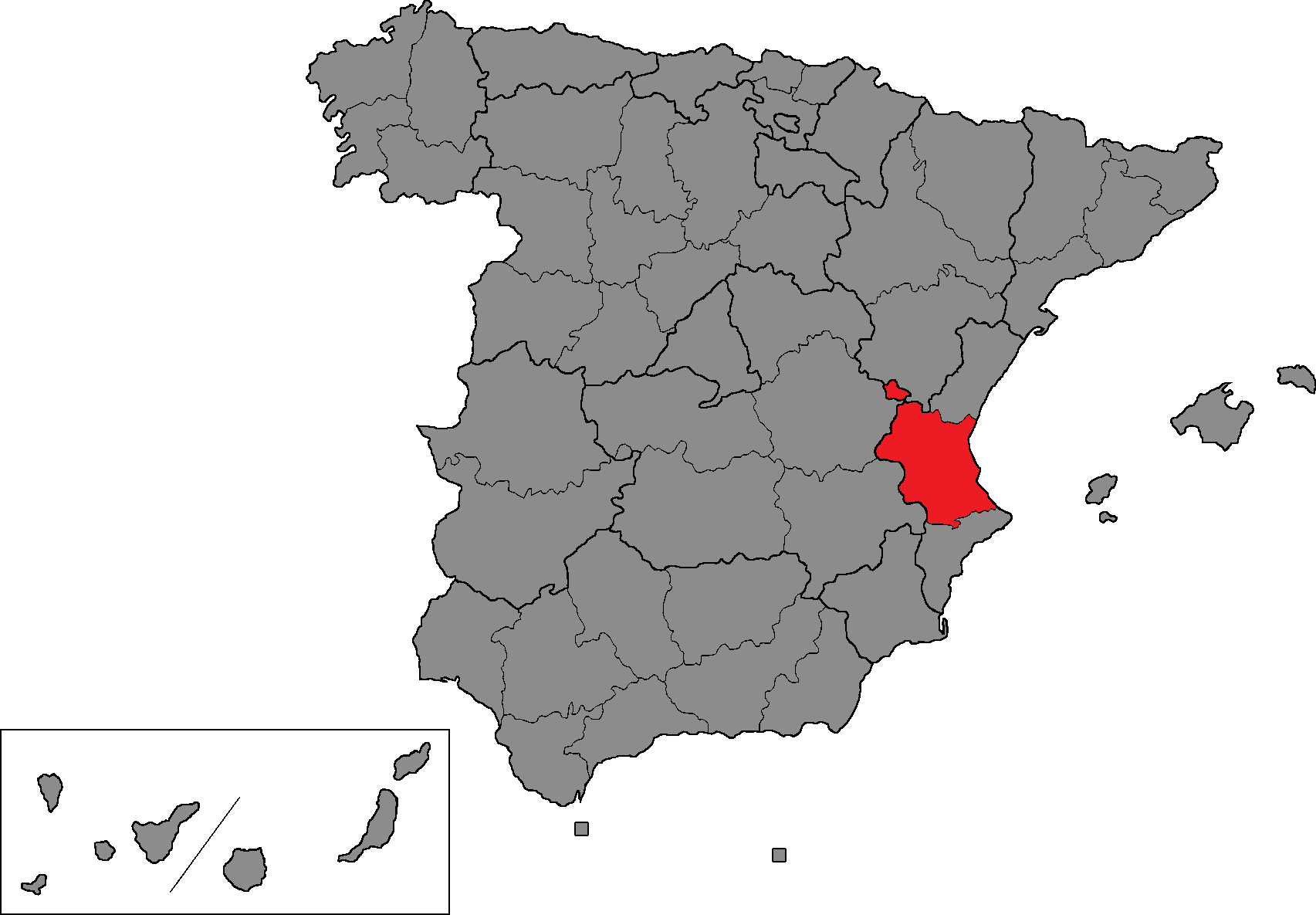
- Location of Valencia within Spain
- Province: Valencia
- Autonomous community: Valencian Community
- Population: ▲2,709,433 (2024)
- Electorate: ▲1,999,340 (2023)
- Major settlements: Valencia, Torrent, Gandía, Paterna, Sagunto

Current constituency
- Created: 1977
- Seats: 4
- Members: PP (2); PSOE (2)

Valencia is one of the 60 constituencies represented in the Senate of Spain, the upper chamber of the Spanish parliament, the Cortes Generales. The constituency (whose boundaries correspond to those of the homonymous province) elects four senators. The electoral system uses open-list (Note: Parties can group candidates into lists, although each candidate is treated separately for the purpose of the voting procedure.) partial block voting, with electors voting for individual candidates instead of parties. Electors can vote for up to three candidates.

== Electoral system ==
The constituency was created as per the Political Reform Law and was first contested in the 1977 general election. The Law provided for the provinces of Spain to be established as multi-member districts in the Senate, with this regulation being maintained under the Spanish Constitution of 1978. Additionally, the Constitution requires for any modification of the provincial limits to be approved under an organic law, needing an absolute majority in the Cortes Generales.

Voting is based on universal suffrage, comprising all Spanish nationals over 18 years of age with full political rights, provided that they have not been deprived of the right to vote by a final sentence. The only exception was in 1977, when this was limited to nationals over 21 years of age and in full enjoyment of their political and civil rights. Amendments in 2011 required non-resident citizens to apply for voting, a system known as "begged" voting (Spanish: Voto rogado). which was abolished in 2022. Further, amendments in 2018 granted the right to vote to those legally incapacitated. 209 Senate seats (207 in 1977, 208 from 1978 to 2026) are elected using open-list partial block voting: voters in constituencies electing four seats can choose up to three candidates; in those with two or three seats, up to two; and in single-member districts, one. Each of the 47 peninsular provinces is allocated four seats, while in insular provinces—such as the Balearic and Canary Islands—the districts are the islands themselves, with the larger ones (Mallorca, Gran Canaria and Tenerife) being allocated three seats each, and the smaller ones (Menorca, Ibiza, Formentera, Fuerteventura, La Gomera, El Hierro, Lanzarote and La Palma) one each. (Note: La Gomera and El Hierro comprised a single constituency for the 1977 election. A constitutional reform in 2026 awarded Formentera an independent senator separate from Ibiza.) Ceuta and Melilla elect two seats each. Until 1985, the law also provided for by-elections to fill Senate seats vacated up to two years into the legislature; subsequently, any vacancies arising after the proclamation of candidates and during the legislative term are filled by the next candidates on the party lists or, when required, by designated substitutes.

The electoral law allows for parties and federations registered in the interior ministry, alliances and groupings of electors to present lists of candidates. Parties and federations intending to form an alliance are required to inform the relevant electoral commission within 10 days of the election call—15 before 1985—whereas groupings of electors need to secure the signature of at least one percent of the electorate in the constituencies for which they seek election—one permille of the electorate, with a compulsory minimum of 500 signatures, until 1985—disallowing electors from signing for more than one list. Also since 2011, parties, federations or alliances that have not obtained a mandate in either chamber of the Cortes at the preceding election are required to secure the signature of at least 0.1 percent of electors in the aforementioned constituencies. Amendments in 2007 required a balanced composition of men and women in the electoral lists, so that candidates of either sex made up at least 40 percent of the total composition; further amendments in 2024 required the use of a zipper system.

== Senators ==
Senators for Valencia 1977–
Key to parties ALV EEM PSOE UCD PP CP AP
Legislature	Election	Distribution
Constituent	1977	3 / 1
1st	1979	2 / 2
2nd	1982	3 / 1
3rd	1986	3 / 1
4th	1989	3 / 1
5th	1993	2 / 2
6th	1996	1 / 3
7th	2000	1 / 3
8th	2004	1 / 3
9th	2008	1 / 3
10th	2011	1 / 3
11th	2015	1 / 3
12th	2016	1 / 3
13th	2019 (Apr)	3 / 1
14th	2019 (Nov)	2 / 2
15th	2023	2 / 2

== General elections ==
=== 2023 ===
Summary of the 23 July 2023 Senate of Spain election results
Candidates	Parties and coalitions	Popular vote	
Candidates	Parties and coalitions	Votes	%
Estela Del Carmen Darocas Marin	PP	493,999	35.42
Juan Antonio Sagredo Marco	PSOE	487,351	34.94
Luis Javier Santamaría Ruiz	PP	477,173	34.21
Cristina Moreno Fernández	PSOE	473,050	33.92
• Rubén Moreno Palanques	PP	466,658	33.46
• Mario Sánchez González	PSOE	433,375	31.07
• Ignacio Blanco Giner	Sumar	219,787	15.76
• Mariam Varea Grau	Sumar	197,267	14.14
• Marina Dabán Alonso	Vox	182,794	13.10
• Lola Seres García	Sumar	177,204	12.70
• María del Carmen Valero Fauli	Vox	169,453	12.15
• Eduardo Rafael Tellez Ruiz	Vox	164,746	11.81
• María Elena García Pelló	PACMA	21,141	1.51
• Juan Cruz Rodenas	PACMA	11,574	0.82
• Sarita Jaramillo Duque	PACMA	10,741	0.77
• Luis María de Mazarredo Aznar	PUM+J	4,357	0.31
• Ximo Cunyà i Alcover	EVB	3,902	0.27
• Ricardo Puchades Pérez	Recortes Cero	3,153	0.22
• Eva Yolanda Del Amo Davó	Recortes Cero	2,053	0.14
• José Portales Talavera	FE de las JONS	1,717	0.12
• Jorge Molina Salazar	CJ	1,619	0.11
• José Francisco Crespo Albiach	Recortes Cero	1,297	0.09
• María Desamparados Escriba Blasco	CJ	1,134	0.08
• José Manuel Jordán Cervera	CJ	735	0.05
Blank ballots		21,135	1.51
Total		4027415	
Valid votes		1,394,533	98.10
Invalid votes		26,921	1.89
Votes cast / turnout		1,421,454	74.66
Abstentions		482,345	25.33
Registered voters		1903799	

=== November 2019 ===
Summary of the 10 November 2019 Senate of Spain election results in Valencia
Candidates	Parties and coalitions	Popular vote	
Candidates	Parties and coalitions	Votes	%
Javier de Lucas Martín	PSOE	392,987	28.75
Fernando de Rosa Torner	PP	392,210	28.70
Mercedes Berenguer Llorens	PSOE	382,882	28.01
Rubén Moreno Palanques	PP	369,385	27.03
• Pedro Rodríguez Navarro	PSOE	367,657	26.90
• Susana Camarero Benítez	PP	323,799	23.69
• Ricardo Belda Valiente	Vox	219,548	16.06
• Susana Ruiz Vives	Podemos–EUPV	182,392	13.34
• Ester Roca Laborda	Podemos–EUPV	156,824	11.47
• Luis Escobar de la Paz	Podemos–EUPV	140,331	10.27
• Dolors Pérez Martí	Més Compromís	128,349	9.39
• Fernando Mulas Delgado	Cs	126,072	9.22
• Ignacio Cartagena Sinisterra	Cs	103,984	7.61
• Inmaculada Ester Redondo Cebolla	Cs	101,827	7.45
• Xavier Hervàs Martínez	Més Compromís	100,088	7.32
• Raquel Vallés Navarro	Més Compromís	92,663	6.78
• Valeri Esteban San Julián	PACMA	26,357	1.93
• María Carmen Jachán Sánchez	PACMA	22,175	1.62
• Carlos Naranjo González	PACMA	15,540	1.14
• Roberto José Lázaro del Barrio	Avant/Adelante–LVEP	7,606	0.56
• Manuel Mocholí Aznar	UiG–Som–CUIDES	7,058	0.52
• Vicent Ruiz Navarro	ERPV	5,605	0.41
• Ricardo Puchades Pérez	Recortes Cero–GV	3,477	0.25
• Elodia Veracruz Poquet Victoria	Recortes Cero–GV	1,877	0.14
• Simeón Lezcano Serrano	PCPE	1,782	0.13
• Mario de Juan Alemany	Recortes Cero–GV	1,335	0.10
• Ocran García Martínez	PUM+J	1,246	0.09
• Enrique Terrado Martínez	aUna CV	817	0.06
• Juan José Ramírez Pérez	Contigo	635	0.05
• María del Carmen Marín Pérez	Contigo	523	0.04
• José Manuel Alejos Tordera	Contigo	440	0.03
• Rafael Vélez Romero	Unidos SI–ACPS–DEf	401	0.03
Blank ballots		24,650	1.80
Total		1,366,747	
Valid votes		1,366,747	97.86
Invalid votes		29,835	2.14
Votes cast / turnout		1,396,582	70.89
Abstentions		573,614	29.11
Registered voters		1,970,196	

== Bibliography ==
- Ley 1/1977, de 4 de enero, para la Reforma Política (Fundamental Law 1/1977). Official State Gazette (in Spanish). 4 January 1977. BOE-A-1977-165.
- Real Decreto-ley 20/1977, de 18 de marzo, sobre Normas Electorales (Royal Decree-Law 20/1977). Official State Gazette (in Spanish). 18 March 1977. BOE-A-1977-7445.
- Constitución Española (Constitution). Official State Gazette (in Spanish). 27 December 1978. BOE-A-1978-31229.
- Ley Orgánica 5/1985, de 19 de junio, del Régimen Electoral General (Organic Law 5/1985). Official State Gazette (in Spanish). 19 June 1985. BOE-A-1985-11672.
- Carreras de Odriozola, Albert; Tafunell Sambola, Xavier (2005) [1989]. Estadísticas históricas de España, siglos XIX-XX (PDF) (in Spanish). Vol. 1 (II ed.). Bilbao: Fundación BBVA. pp. 1072–1097. ISBN 84-96515-00-1. Archived from the original (PDF) on 24 September 2015.
