= Hispano-Moresque ware =

Ceramics of Al'Ándalus

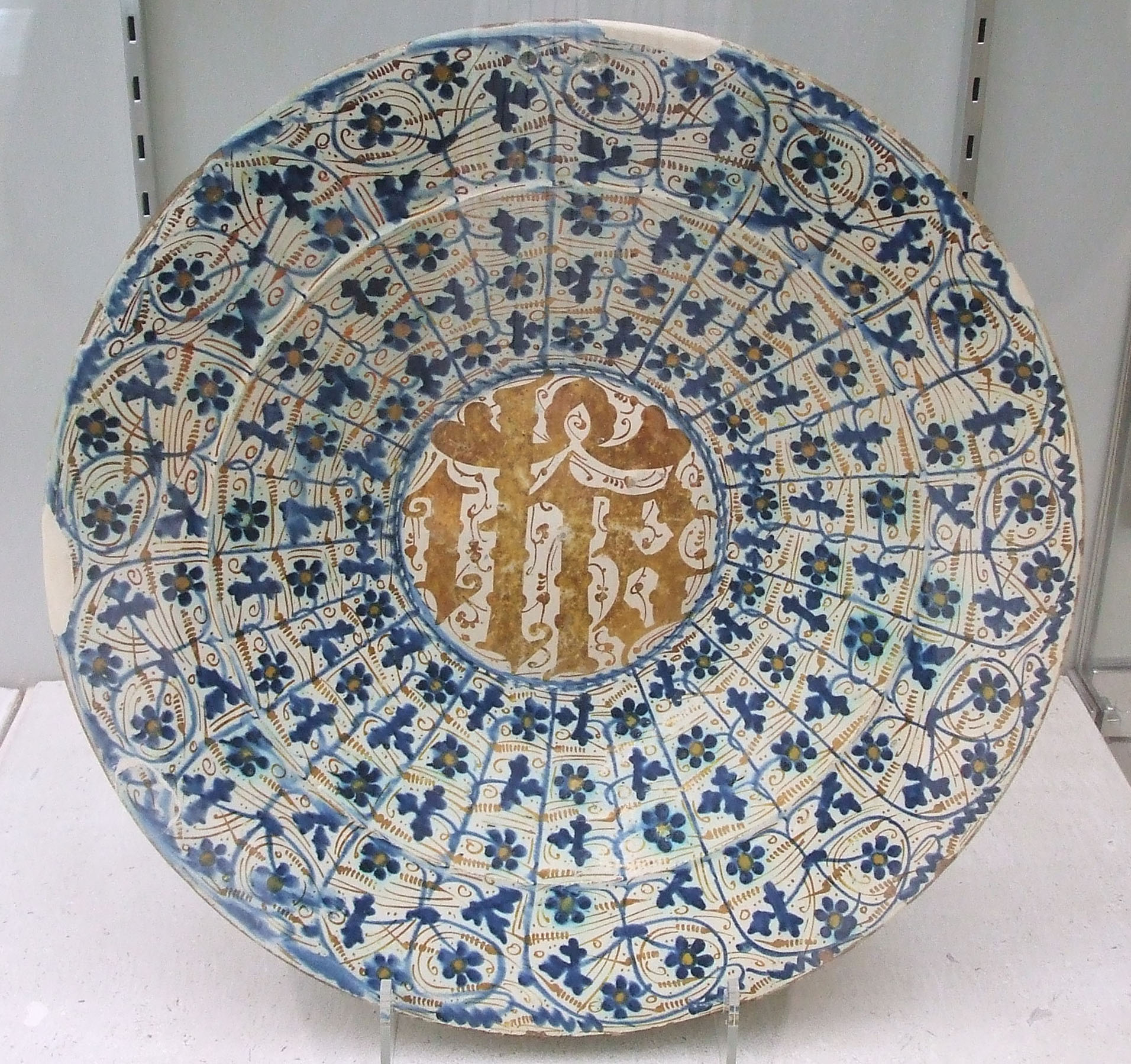
A Hispano-Moresque dish, approximately 32 cm diameter, with Christian monogram "IHS", decorated in cobalt blue and gold luster. Valencia, c. 1430–1500. Burrell Collection.

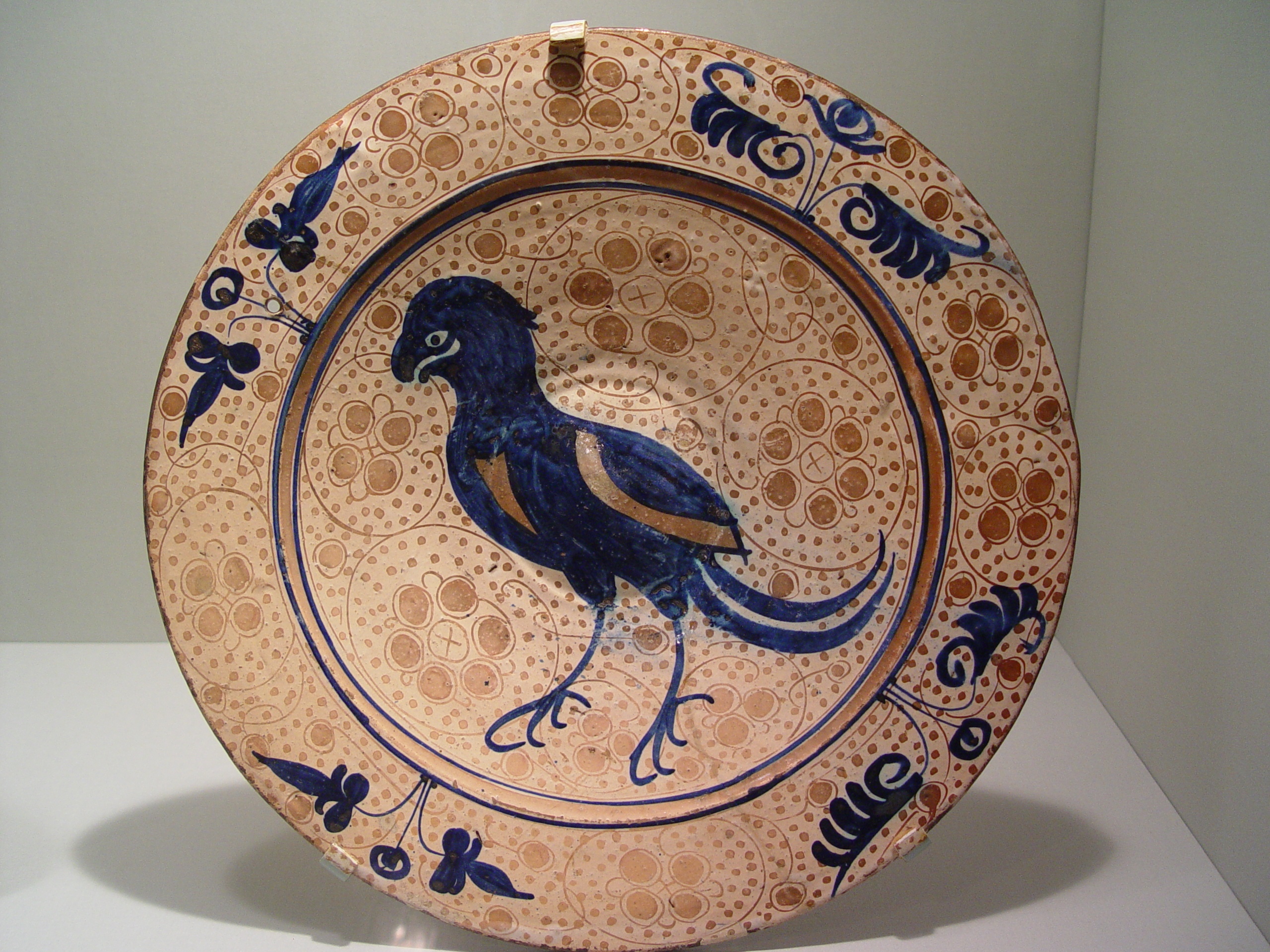
Manises dish, 1430–1450, Diameter: 14 in. (35.56 cm)

Hispano-Moresque ware is a style of initially Islamic pottery created in Al-Andalus (Muslim Iberia), which continued to be produced under Christian rule in styles blending Islamic and European elements. It was the most elaborate and luxurious pottery being produced in Europe until the Italian maiolica industry developed sophisticated styles in the 15th century, and was exported over most of Europe. The industry's most successful period was the 14th and 15th centuries.

Around 711, the Moors conquered part of Spain. Over the following centuries, they introduced two ceramic techniques to Europe: glazing with an opaque white tin-glaze, and lustreware, which imitates metallic finishes with iridescent effects. Hispano-Moresque wares use both processes, applying the paint as an overglaze which is then fired again. Lustreware was a speciality of Islamic pottery, at least partly because the use of drinking and eating vessels in gold and silver, the ideal in ancient Rome and Persia as well as medieval Christian societies, is prohibited by the Hadiths, with the result that pottery and glass were used for tableware by Muslim elites, when Christian medieval elites still normally used metal for both dishes and cups.

At first centred on Málaga in the south, and using typical Islamic decoration, by the 15th century the largest production was around Valencia, which had long been reconquered by the Crown of Aragon. Wares from Manises and other Valencian towns were mainly for the Christian market, and exported very widely.

== Centres of production ==
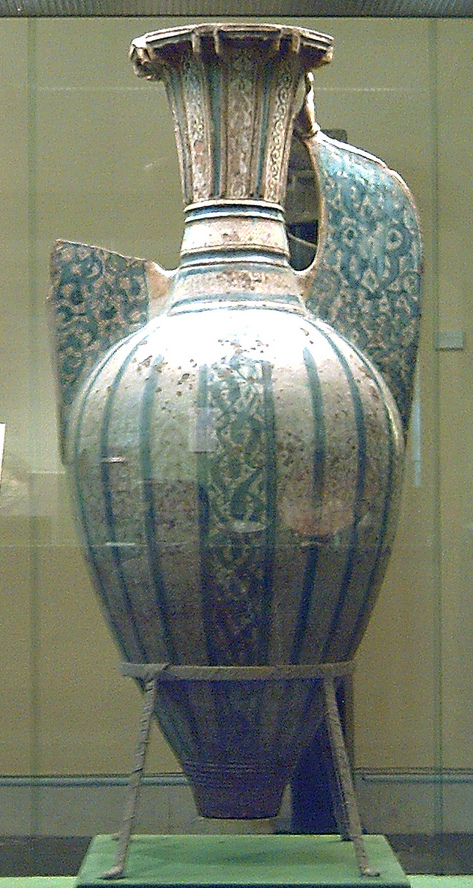
One of a number of large vases made for the Alhambra in Granada, 134 cm high

=== Andalusian ===
The earliest major centre of fine pottery in Al-Andalus was Málaga in southern Spain. This is the major centre whose best-known wares were produced in a Muslim kingdom, as opposed to by a workforce presumed to be largely Muslim, or Morisco, under Christian rule. It was already celebrated for its gold lustrewares in the 14th century, and remained under Muslim rule until 1487, shortly before the fall of Granada, the last Muslim-ruled kingdom. Murcia, Almería, and perhaps Granada itself were also early centres of production. This pottery stayed much closer to styles seen in other Islamic countries, although much of it was being exported to Christian markets, as can be seen by the coats of arms on many pieces.

Wares from Málaga were celebrated for their gold lustre on white enamel; they are distinguished from lustreware from Granada by the inclusion of blue paint with the gold lustre over a red clay that is characteristic of the region.

At least one authority, Alan Caiger-Smith, excludes this pottery from the term "Hispano-Moresque", but most who use the term at all use it to include Malaga and other Andalusian wares from the Islamic period as well as the Valencian pottery. When Spanish medieval pottery was first studied in the 19th century, there was awareness of the Valencian centres but very little of the Al-Andalus ones, and there has been a steady re-attribution of types of pottery formerly attributed to Manises to Malaga and the south, which was still continuing in the 1980s, following archaeological discoveries in Malaga, and scientific analysis of the clays used.

Though other types of painted pottery, not usually called Hispano-Moresque ware, were produced in Al-Andaluz earlier, firm evidence of lustreware production is not found before the early or mid-13th century, when it may have been begun by Egyptian potters escaping political disturbances. Already it was being exported, as some of the earliest evidence is bowls set as decoration into the facades of churches in Pisa when they were built. An import from Malaga through Sandwich, Kent in England for the Spanish-born Queen Eleanor of Castile was recorded in 1289, consisting of "42 bowls, 10 dishes, and 4 earthenware jars of foreign colour (extranei coloris)". Malagan ware was also exported to the Islamic world, and has been found at Fustat (medieval Cairo) and elsewhere.

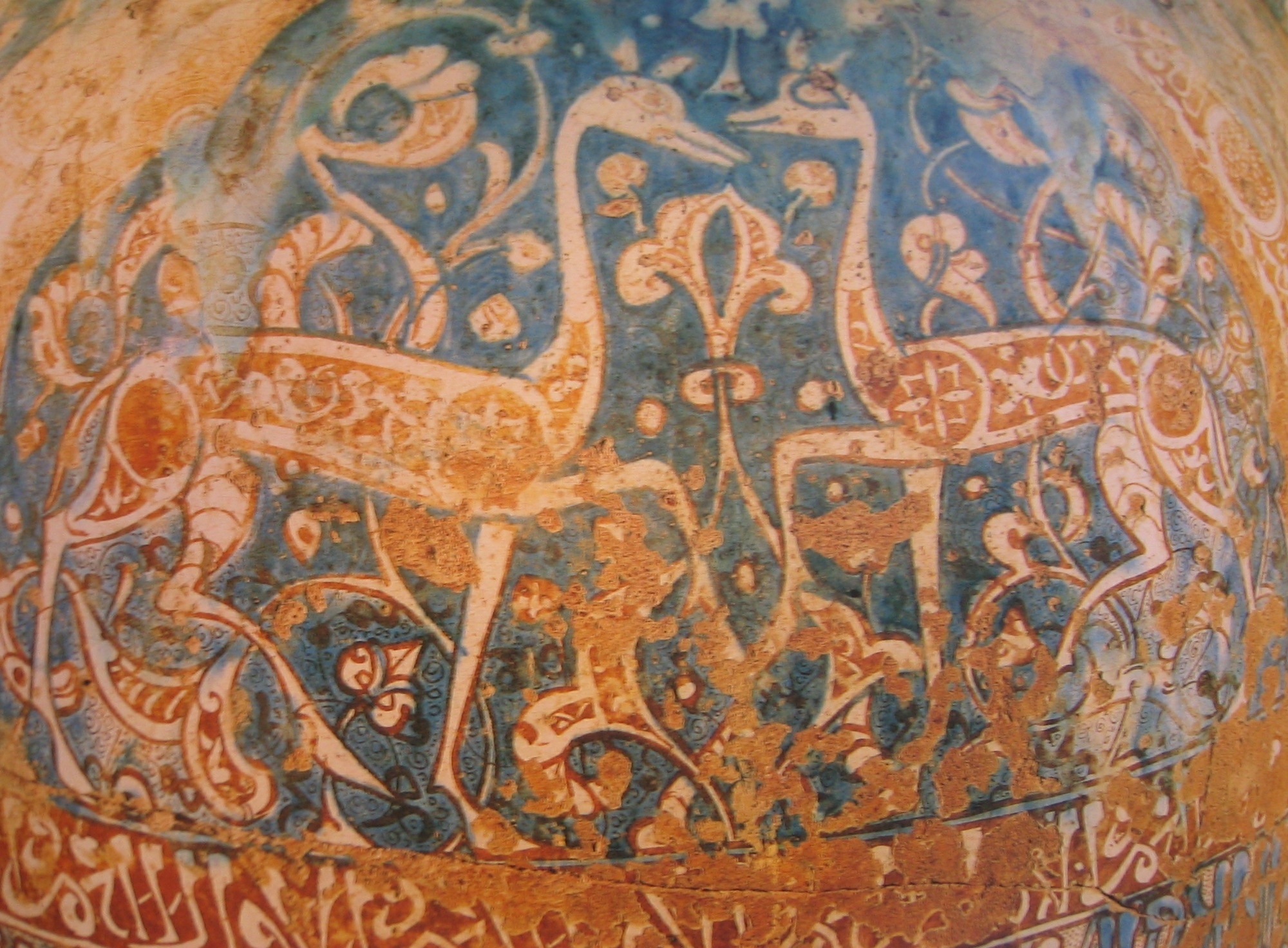
Detail of two gazelles from an Alhambra vase, c. 1400

The best known and most impressive examples of Andalucian wares are the Alhambra vases, a number of very large vases made to stand in niches in the Alhambra in Granada, and perhaps elsewhere. These are very atypical in Islamic pottery in having only a decorative function, with no practical purpose, and are "by far" the largest pieces of lustreware known. They are based on traditional shapes descended from the ancient amphora, but at about 115 to 170 cm tall are close to the height of a human. They are thought to come from a range of dates covering the late 14th and the 15th centuries, and the decoration and precise shape of the body is different in each surviving example. According to Alan Caiger-Smith, "few other pots in the world make such a strong physical impression".

All are now in museums, five in Spain and others in St Petersburg, Berlin, Washington D.C., Stockholm and Palermo; various large fragments also survive. Lustre tiles are also still in place at the Alhambra. The "Fortuny Tablet", a unique plaque measuring 90 × 44 cm, has a garden-like design, inside a border with an inscription praising Yusuf III, Sultan of Granada (r. 1408–1417). Its design resembles that of some Spanish carpets.

After Yusuf's throne was inherited by an eight-year-old in 1418, the Nasrid kingdom went into a decline before its final conquest, and the production of fine pottery seems to cease abruptly about 1450, even though the name obra de Malequa ("Malaga work") continued to be used in Valencia for lustreware long afterwards.

=== Valencia ===
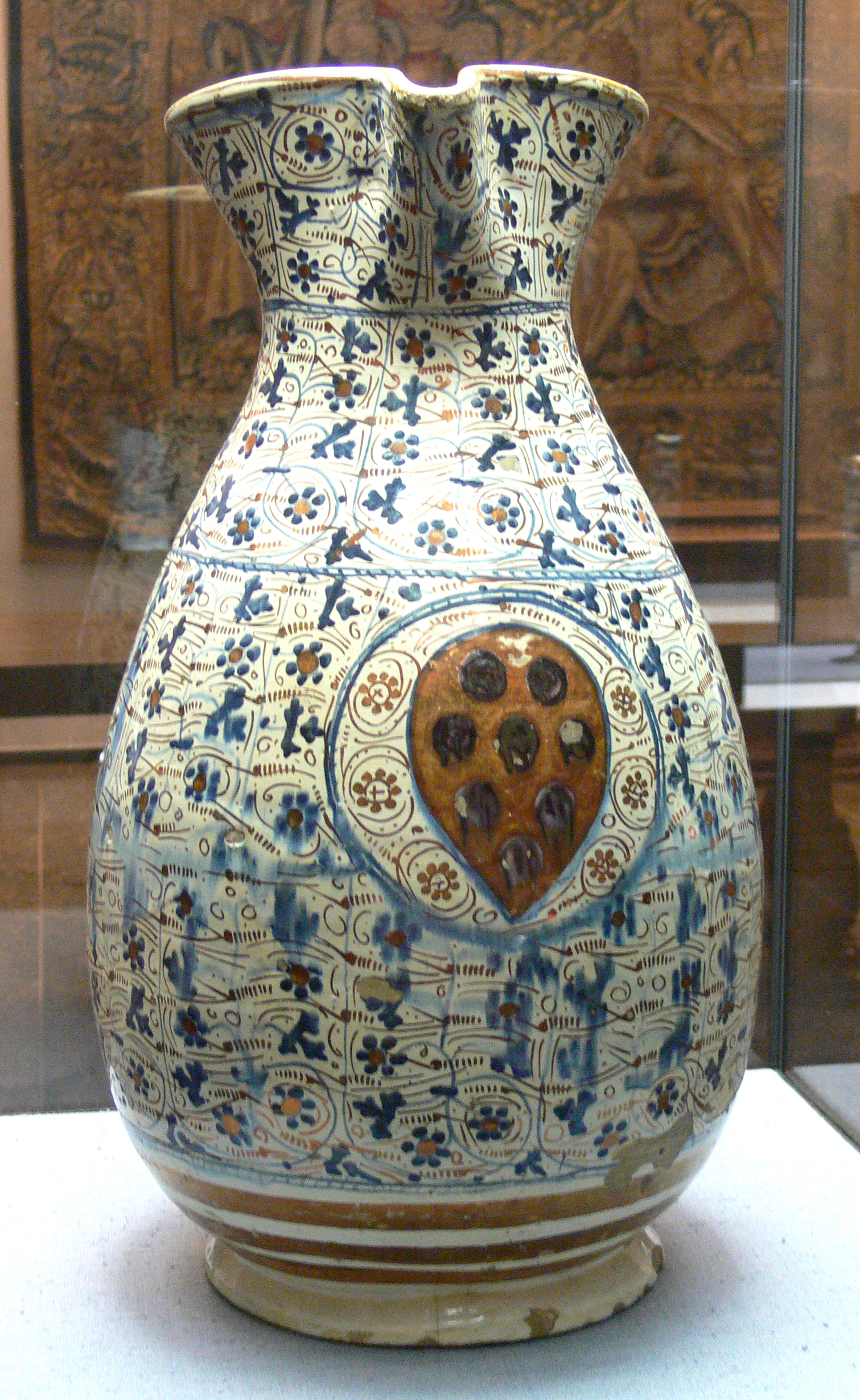
Jug with the Medici arms, 1450–1460

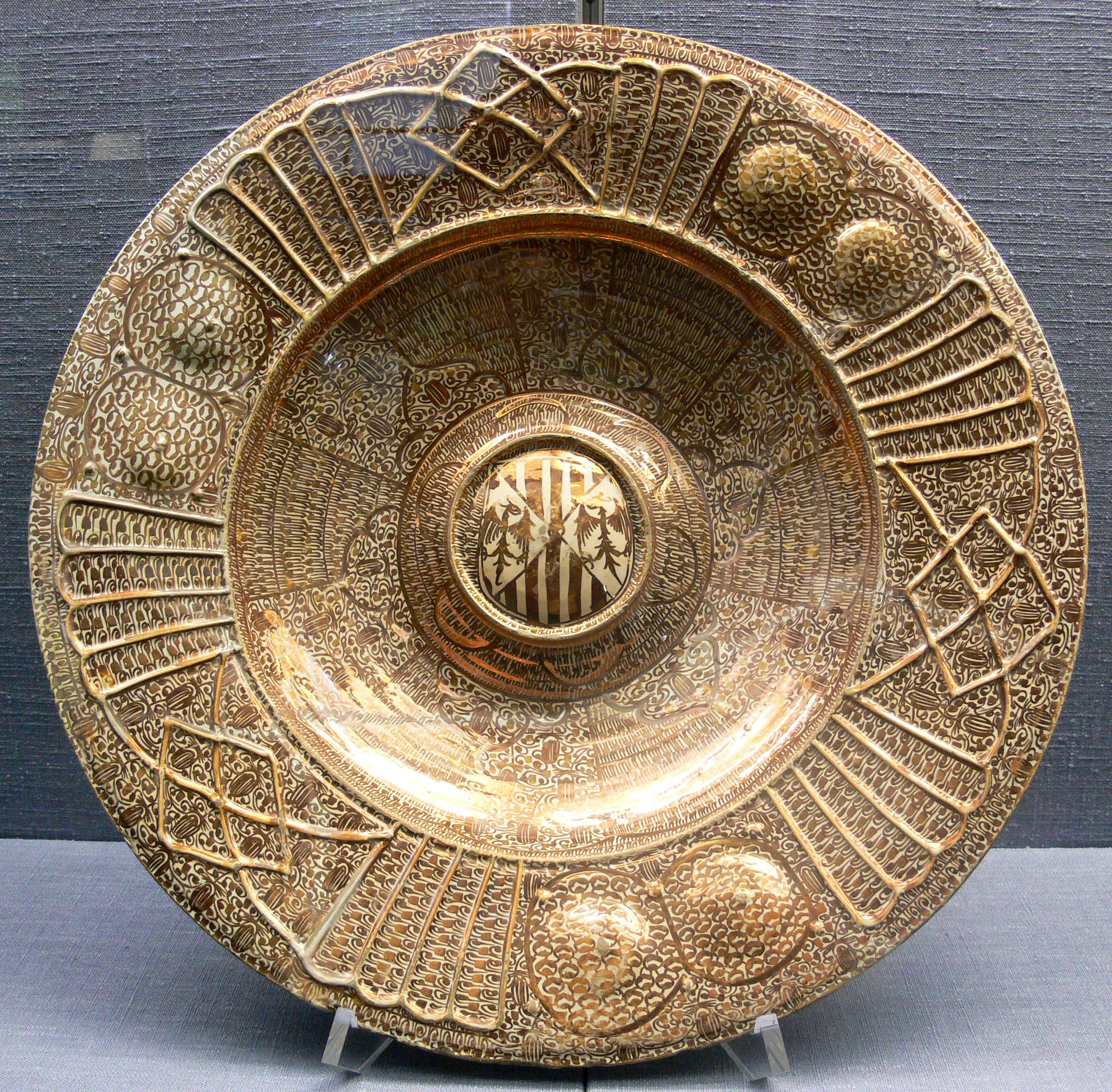
Early 16th century Valencian dish with the arms of the Kingdom of Sicily.

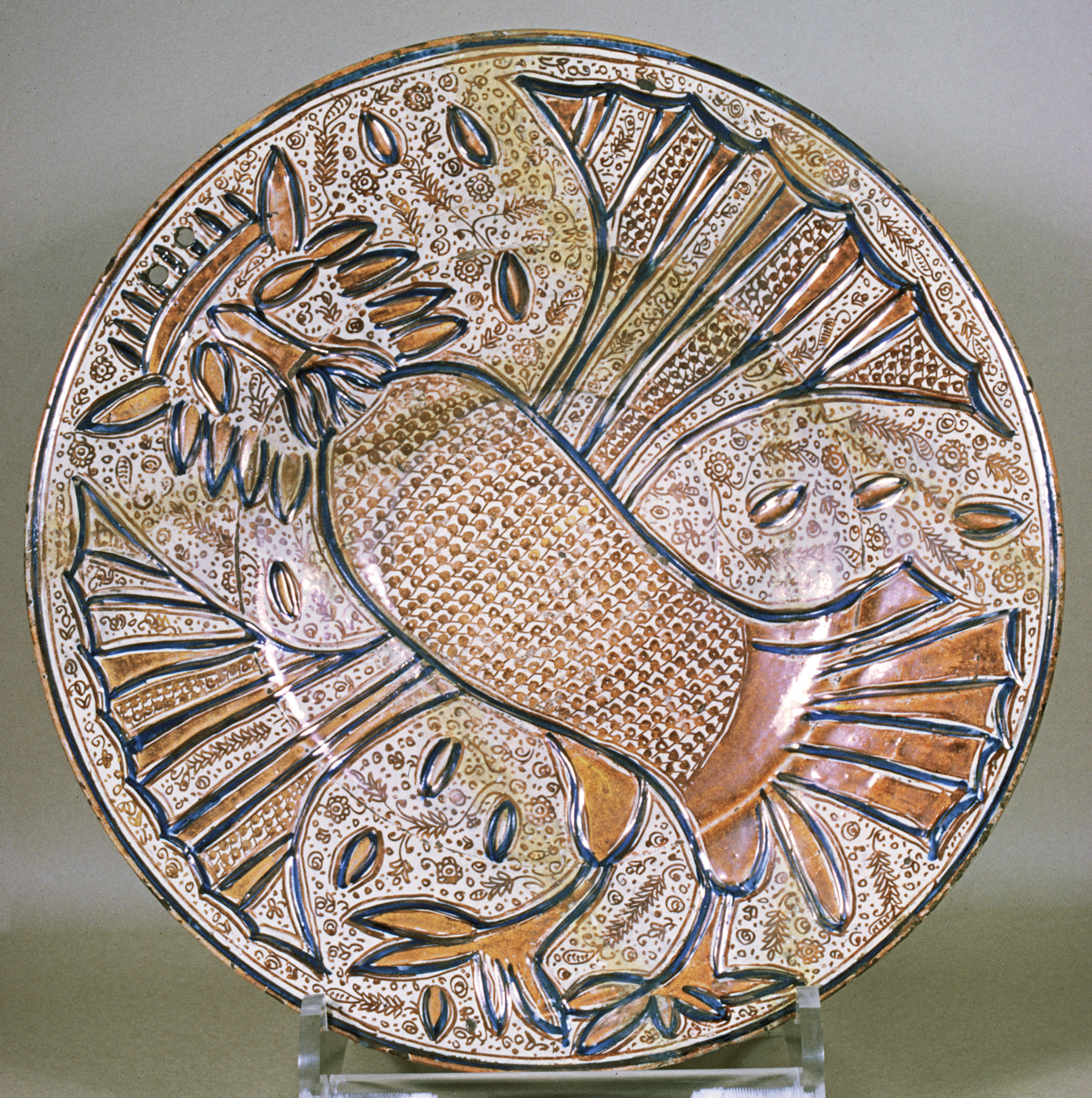
Manises plate, circa 1535. A fantastical owl wearing a crown, a characteristic Manises design during the first half of the 16th century.

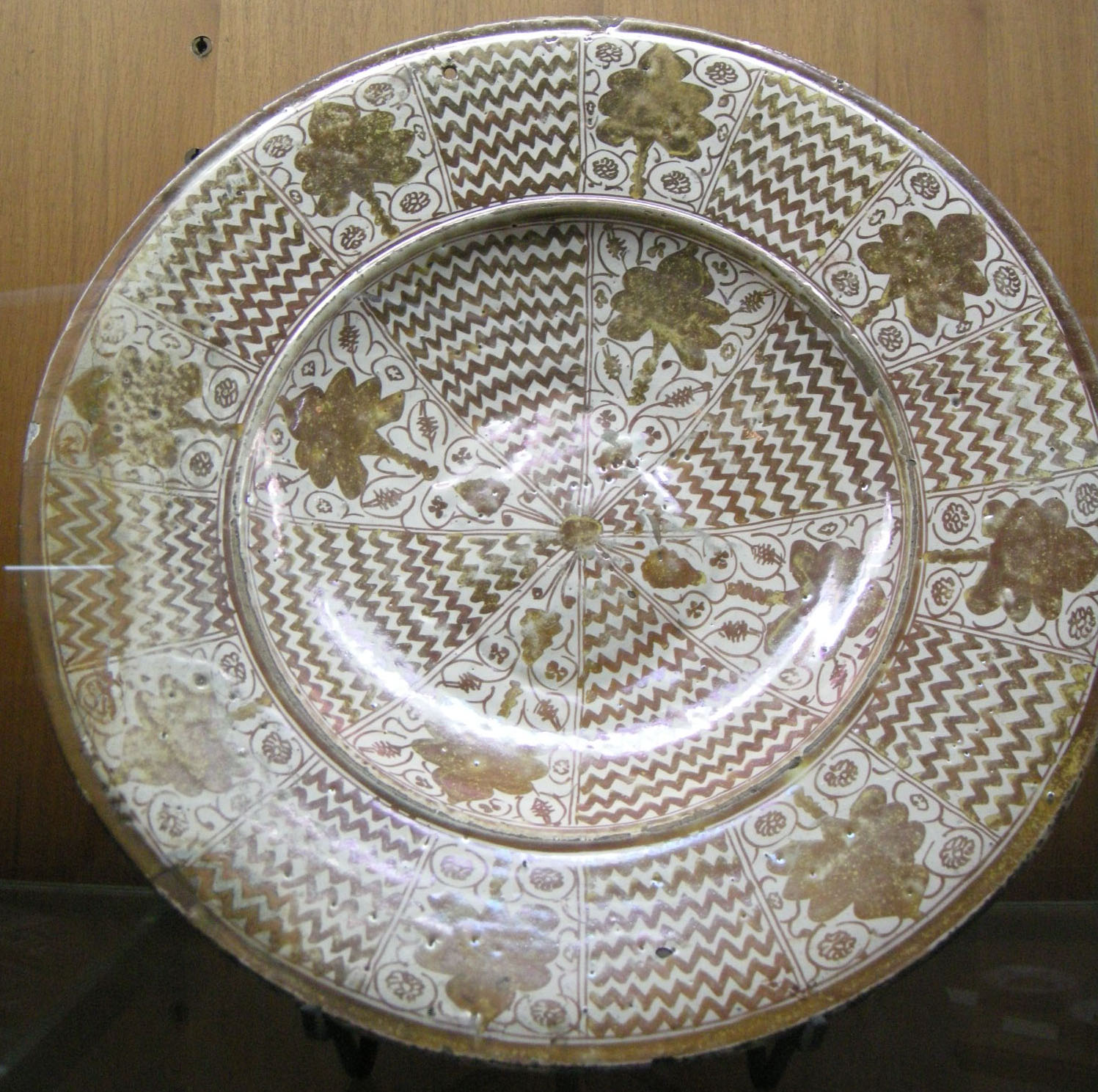
16th century Manises dish, as quality began to fall off.

Valencia and its suburbs Manises and Paterna became important centres after potters migrated there from the south; the city had returned to Christian rule from 1238, and the immigration of skilled potters had been going on since at least the mid-14th century. In 1362 a cardinal commissioned floor-tiles in "obra de Malicha" ("Malaga work", probably meaning lustreware) for the Pope's Palais des Papes in Avignon from two masters in Manises, at least one with an Arabic name (though "Juan" as his forename). In 1484 a German traveller mentioned vessels "which are made by the Moorish potters".

It seems that the local lords of Manises, the family of Buyl, encouraged the immigration, and may have acted as distributors and agents for the product; certainly when Maria of Castile, Queen of Aragon, wanted to order a large service in 1454, she wrote to the Buyl lord for him to arrange it. Several Buyl's had served as ambassadors, to Granada as well as Christian courts, giving them contacts in many markets. They seem to have taken a 10% royalty on all sales of pottery, and enjoyed a very high income from these. The largest deposit of Manises ware found by archaeology, apart from Manises itself, comes from Sluis in the Netherlands, then part of the territories of the wealthy Duchy of Burgundy. Manises also had clay and a cave nearby where a special sand used as a raw material for glazes was extracted.

=== Catalonia ===
Barcelona in Catalonia in northeastern Spain, which was under Muslim rule from 718 to 801, became a centre for pottery much later, probably receiving immigrant Christian potters from Al-Andalus, especially Valencia, during the later Reconquista period. It was important at first for wares resembling the brown and green decorated pottery of Paterna and in the 16th century for lustreware in a "warm silvery-gold", either reflecting different materials available, or a deliberate change in style. Several other towns began to produce lustreware in the same period.

== Style ==
Much, in Valencia most, of the pottery was clearly made for a Christian market, as it includes coats of arms and other Western elements in the decoration. As well as the Christian IHS monogram in the centre, the naturalistic vine-leaf decoration of the dish shown at top is derived from Gothic art, probably via the border decoration of illuminated manuscripts. No pieces have yet been found that are signed (as many pieces from other Islamic regions are), and hardly any dated, so heraldry, especially when pieces are assumed to have been commissioned to celebrate a wedding, is important evidence for dating. The pieces "had to be spectacular and elegant, yet every category of vessel had a particular use" and on grand occasions all might be used, even though the largest platters spent most of the time on display propped up vertically on sideboards, as is shown in some contemporary paintings.

Andalucian designs use a repertoire of geometric motifs, many of which probably had a religious significance of which Christian buyers remained unaware. These are usually contained in painted compartments. Pseudo-Kufic script is used, as well as inscriptions in proper Arabic. The dominant colours of gold and blue perhaps represent the sun and sky; other colours available, such as brown, green and yellow, are much less used. From about 1400 some elements, including the depiction of animals, which were probably first used for export wares seem to have become popular among local Muslim buyers also; two of the later "Alhambra vases" described above have pairs of gazelles. By then the Nasrid kings of Granada had given themselves heraldic arms in the Christian way, which are also seen on pottery.

Many large Valencian dishes with typical complicated designs centring on a coat of arms are also decorated on the underside with boldly-painted animal figures occupying the whole space, often also taken from heraldry. Of Manises ware, Alan Caiger-Smith has written, "the sustained production of fine pieces at Manises during the years 1380–1430 is without parallel in the history of ceramics. Many of these vessels will keep their place among the world's finest pottery for ever; regardless of changes and outlook."

Hispano-Moresque shapes of the fifteenth century included the albarello (a tall jar), large serving dishes with coats of arms, made for wealthy people all over Europe, jugs (some on high feet, the citra and the grealet), a deep-sided dish (the lebrillo de alo) and the eared bowl (cuenco de oreja). Hispano-Moresque wares had a considerable influence on early Italian maiolica, indeed two possible derivations of the name have connections with it. Towards the end of the century designs began to incorporate raised elements in imitation of European silverware shapes, such as gadrooning. Tiles were made in all centres, and the small ceramic tombstone of an Andalucian student who died in 1409 is one of the very few precisely datable pieces.

Albert Van de Put categorizes the decorative motifs into ten categories: large mock-Arabic character, small mock-Arabic character, spur-band and cross-hatching, flower and leaf on dotted ground, large vine-leaf and small flower (two sizes), foliage, bryony leaf and small flower, smaller rounded vine-leaf, and diapering of dots and stalks derived from preceding, and gadroons.

== Decline and revival ==
The Reconquista captured Valencia for the third and final time in 1238, and Malaga was one of the last cities to fall, after the Siege of Málaga (1487). The remaining Islamic Mudéjar and converted Morisco populations were expelled from Spain in 1496 and 1609 respectively, the latter Expulsion of the Moriscos involving a third of the population in the province of Valencia. But many of the craftsmen had long been Christians in any case, and the Hispano-Moresque style survived in the province of Valencia, although showing an immediate drop in quality. Later wares usually have a coarse reddish-buff body, dark blue decoration and luster; by now their position as the most prestigious European pottery had been lost to Italian and other producers.

Alan Caiger-Smith describes the Valencian industry as the victim of its own success; as the wares initially produced for the very top of society, usually as bespoke commissions with personalized heraldry, were demanded by the expanding lesser nobility and bourgeoisie, both the size of pieces and their quality of decoration declined, with painting becoming more routine repetitions of simple motifs. The Italian maiolica industry, largely developed in imitation of the Spanish, was developing in directions where Valencia could or would not follow. That the Italian figurative Renaissance painting was not attempted in Spain is perhaps not surprising, but Valencia only joined the Italians in copying simpler shapes from metalware, the Italians being more ambitious.

Wares continued to be produced in a slow decline, now relying on relatively local demand for tiles and other decorated items, including votive offerings. There were still said to be thirty working kilns at Manises around 1800, by which time the first efforts to revive the industry's former glory had already been made. The secrets of the techniques for making high-quality wares were largely lost, and after Carlos III of Spain took a personal interest a report was commissioned in 1785 to record the methods then being used, lest more was lost. By the 1870s a market had developed for pieces as close to the early work as could be managed, and a number of new firms were set up, some of which continue today, although little original work in the tradition is done.

== Other uses of the term ==
The term "Hispano-Moresque" is also used to describe figured silk textiles with geometric patterns woven in Al-Andalus, and sometimes to refer to Mudéjar or other work in other media, such as carpets, an industry which followed a similar pattern to pottery in Spain. The Metropolitan Museum of Art uses the term to describe a gilded parade helmet in its collection.

== See also ==
- Talavera de la Reina pottery
