= Manises =

- Town and municipality
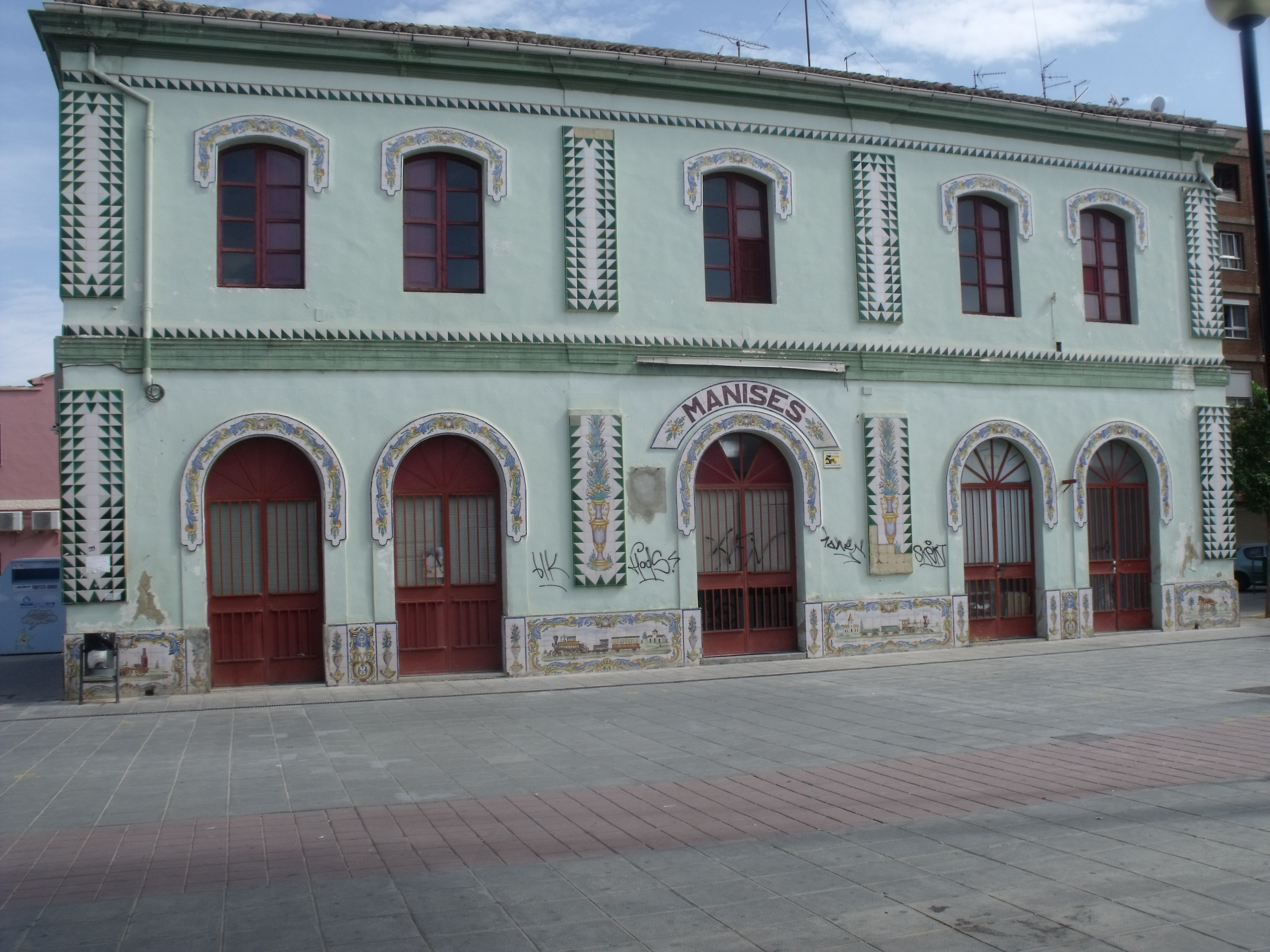

- Coat of arms

- Location in Spain Manises (Valencian Community) Manises (Spain)
- Coordinates: 39°29′0″N 0°27′0″W
- Country: Spain
- Autonomous community: Valencian Community
- Province: Valencia
- Comarca: Horta Oest
- Judicial district: Quart de Poblet

Government
  - Alcalde: Javier Mansilla Bermejo (2023-) (PSPV-PSOE)

Area
  - Total: 19.60 km^{2} (7.57 sq mi)
- Elevation: 52 m (171 ft)

Population (2025-01-01)
  - Total: 32,609
  - Density: 1,664/km^{2} (4,309/sq mi)
- Demonyms: • maniser, -a (Val.) • manisero/a (Sp.)
- Official language(s): Valencian; Spanish
- Linguistic area: Valencian
- Time zone: UTC+1 (CET)
  - Summer (DST): UTC+2 (CEST)
- Postal code: 46940
- Website: Official website

Manises (Note: Pronunciation of Manises: Valencian: [maˈnizes] Spanish: [maˈnises]) is a town and municipality in the comarca of Horta Oest in the Valencian Community, Spain. Located in the province of Valencia, it had 30,693 inhabitants in 2018 (INE) and is famous for its pottery and being the location of Valencia Airport.

== Physical Geography ==
The town is situated at the western end of the Horta de València (Spanish: Huerta de Valencia), on the right bank of the river Turia.

== Climate ==
The climate is typically Mediterranean but with some variations, due to its inland location, Manises has warmer summers and cooler winters than the coast.

Climate data for Manises, 10 km inland from Valencia
| Month | Jan | Feb | Mar | Apr | May | Jun | Jul | Aug | Sep | Oct | Nov | Dec | Year |
|---|---|---|---|---|---|---|---|---|---|---|---|---|---|
| Mean daily maximum °C (°F) | 15.5 (59.9) | 17.0 (62.6) | 18.9 (66.0) | 20.6 (69.1) | 23.5 (74.3) | 27.2 (81.0) | 30.1 (86.2) | 30.3 (86.5) | 27.8 (82.0) | 23.4 (74.1) | 19.0 (66.2) | 16.1 (61.0) | 22.5 (72.5) |
| Daily mean °C (°F) | 10.2 (50.4) | 11.5 (52.7) | 13.1 (55.6) | 15.0 (59.0) | 18.2 (64.8) | 22.0 (71.6) | 24.9 (76.8) | 25.4 (77.7) | 22.8 (73.0) | 18.4 (65.1) | 13.9 (57.0) | 11.2 (52.2) | 17.2 (63.0) |
| Mean daily minimum °C (°F) | 5.0 (41.0) | 6.0 (42.8) | 7.2 (45.0) | 9.4 (48.9) | 12.9 (55.2) | 16.9 (62.4) | 19.8 (67.6) | 20.4 (68.7) | 17.7 (63.9) | 13.3 (55.9) | 8.9 (48.0) | 6.3 (43.3) | 12.0 (53.6) |
| Average precipitation mm (inches) | 38 (1.5) | 32 (1.3) | 34 (1.3) | 38 (1.5) | 36 (1.4) | 20 (0.8) | 14 (0.6) | 19 (0.7) | 49 (1.9) | 74 (2.9) | 54 (2.1) | 50 (2.0) | 459 (18.1) |
| Average precipitation days (≥ 1 mm) | 4 | 3 | 3 | 5 | 5 | 3 | 1 | 2 | 4 | 5 | 4 | 4 | 43 |
| Mean monthly sunshine hours | 171 | 170 | 217 | 233 | 261 | 286 | 323 | 286 | 239 | 202 | 168 | 155 | 2,706 |
Source: Agencia Estatal de Meteorología

== History ==
Manises extends to the right bank of the river Turia (the northern boundary of the term) and is uneven in the western sector for the first mountains that dominate the alluvial plain of Turia.

Agriculture is predominantly carob trees, olive trees and small areas of vineyards and almond trees. The irrigation uses water from the river Turia through the ditch of Manises.

The main economic activity is industry, focusing on ceramics; in the Middle Ages and Renaissance era Manises was the most important production centre for Hispano-Moresque ware, which was exported all over Europe. The industry had a strong comeback in the second half of the 19th century. In 1917 the School of Ceramics was founded, which included the study of this activity in its various forms: artistic ceramics, porcelain and tiles. Today small businesses predominate.

Industrial activity resulted in a sharp increase in population, which tripled in the 19th century and increased sixfold in the twentieth century. Today the population is around 26,000 inhabitants.

The city is located to the right of Turia, at its eastern end, on a small hill in front of Paterna, across the river. It stretches from west to east along the river, and the last extension is beside Quart de Poblet. The industrial sectors are concentrated in the east and north of the town near the railway station of Valencia to Llíria. The parish church (St. John the Baptist) was built between 1734 and 1751, the high altar had belonged to the convent of mercy in Valencia. An old Islamic farmstead was donated in 1238 by James I to Artal de Luna, and in 1307 was sold to Pere Boïl and became the center of the barony of Manises. The town had a mixture of Christians and Moors between 1602 and 1609, with 150 Christian homes and 50 Moorish homes.

In 1924 city status was granted. In addition to various findings from the Roman era, within the municipality there is an aqueduct built at that time named the Arches. At the western end of the municipality, on the banks of the Turia, there is a Water Treatment Station of Valencia. The municipality also includes the hamlets of the Dam and the Cave and the district of San Francisco.

Manises Airport, serving the city of Valencia, is located west of the conurbation, within Manises municipality, about 8 km from Valencia's downtown. It shared the premises with the military air base of Manises, now dismantled. It has all modern airport facilities and a radar located in a pine forest near the Albufera of Valencia.

Although Manises has long been inhabited the earliest records show the Romans working to bring water to Valencia. Then came the Arabs, who developed the settlement. Later, Valencian King James I granted it as a prize to one of his best men, Don Artal de Luna, one of the "Rich-homs of nature" who accompanied him.

It is this donation recorded in the Book of the cast, the first officially known quotation from Manises: "Artallus de Luna. Alquerian de Paterna et de Manizaes, VII idus Julil" (7 July 1237).

In the early 16th century Manises tiles had much commercial success, especially the heraldic type. In the 17th century all Valencian tiles had a significant rise.

The beginning of the 20th century brought a new style, modernism, which saw ornamental elements incorporated into ceramics. Until then tiles were used for flooring or bases, but was then used in embellishing facades with its rich polychrome, a trend which has continued to this day.

Two other notable developments took place, in 1914 of the School of Ceramics of Manises was founded by Vicente Vilar David (Industrial Engineering by School of Barcelona, Lt. Mayor Primo de Rivera.) Secondly 1969 saw the opening of the Municipal Museum of Ceramics (Museu de la Ceràmica), renovated and enlarged in 1989, which displays industrial and artistic developments to the present day.

== Demography ==
It has a population of 30,508 inhabitants in 2009. 6.21% of its inhabitants was, according to the same census, foreign nationals in 2007.

=== Subdivisions ===
Neighborhood

- El Carmen
- Socusa
- Obradors
- San Jerónimo (shared with the neighboring municipality of Quart de Poblet)
- Saint Felix
- Alameda Park
- San Francisco

Farmhouses and hamlets

- La Presa
- La Cova

Housing developments

- La Presa
- Els Pous
- Montemayor
- La Mallà. It is located 2 km west of Manises, direction Riba-roja de Túria

== Local government ==
The local council is elected every 4 years and chooses the mayor from amongst its members.

=== Summary of council election results ===
| | 1979 | 1983 | 1987 | 1991 | 1995 | 1999 | 2003 | 2007 | 2011 | 2015 | 2019 | 2023 |
|---|---|---|---|---|---|---|---|---|---|---|---|---|
| Spanish Socialist Workers' Party (PSOE) | 8 | 14 | 11 | 11 | 7 | 6 | 6 | 8 | 5 | 4 | 4 | 5 |
| United Left (IU) | 8 | 4 | 3 | 4 | 5 | 2 | 1 | 1 | 2 | 2 | | |
| Union of the Democratic Centre (UCD) | 5 | | | | | | | | | | | |
| People's Party (PP) | | 3 | 3 | 5 | 8 | 11 | 13 | 12 | 12 | 6 | 5 | 6 |
| Valencian Union (UV) | | 3 | 1 | 1 | 1 | | | | | | | |
| Democratic and Social Centre (CDS) | | | 3 | | | | | | | | | |
| Agrupament Progressiste de Manises (APM) | | | | | | 2 | 1 | | 2 | 5 | 6 | 5 |
| Coalició Compromís (Compromís) | | | | | | | | | 2 | 5 | 6 | 5 |
| Podemos (Podemos) | | | | | | | | | | 3 | 2 | 1 |
| Citizens (Cs) | | | | | | | | | | 1 | 3 | |
| Vox (Vox) | | | | | | | | | | | 1 | 4 |
| Total number of seats | 21 | 21 | 21 | 21 | 21 | 21 | 21 | 21 | 21 | 21 | 21 | 21 |

== Economy ==
=== The ceramics of Manises ===
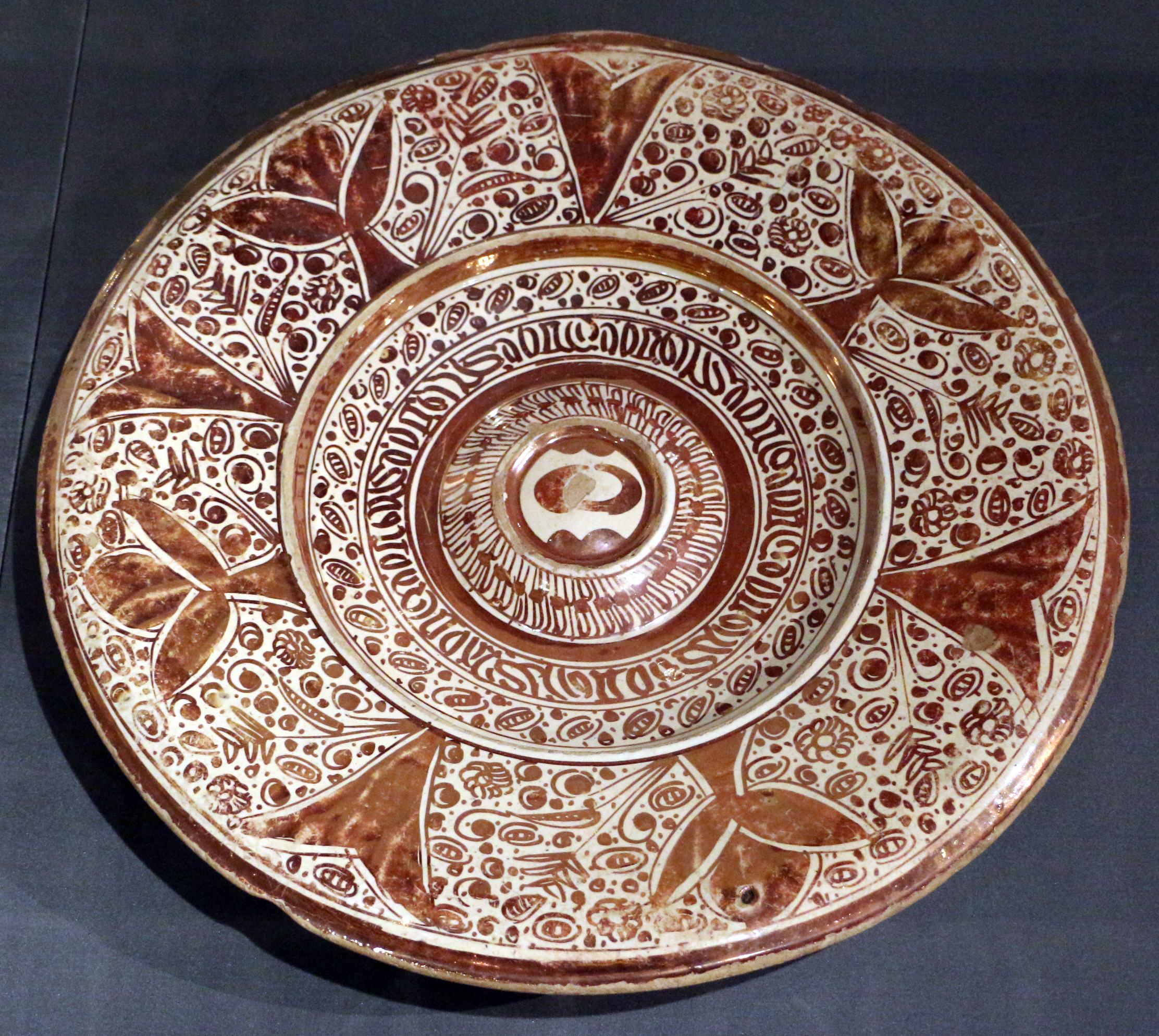
Lustreware of Manises, circa 1470-1475, Museu Nacional de Arte Antiga, Lisbon

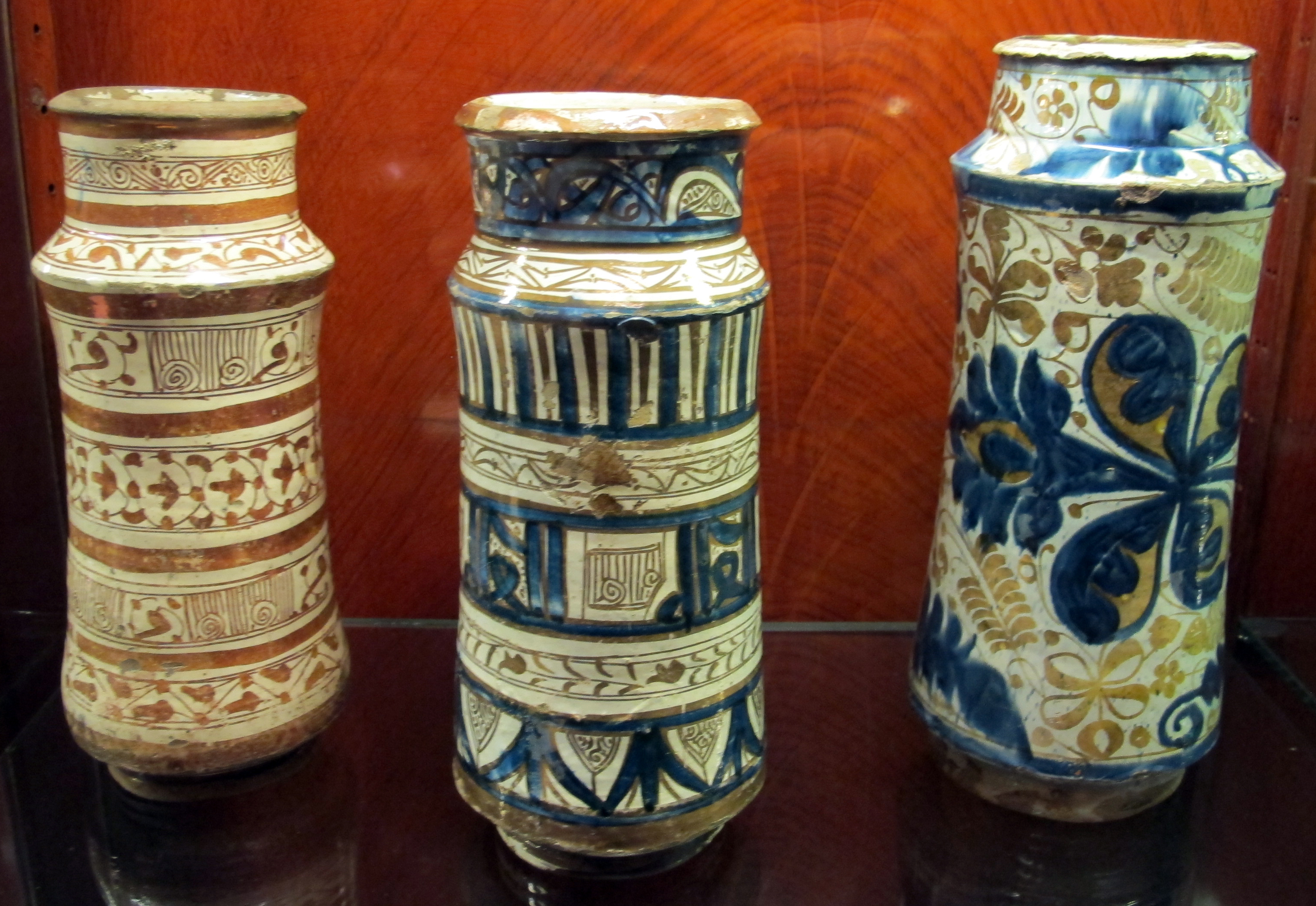
Albarelli (pharmacy jars) produced in Manises, circa 1400-1450, Hispanic Society of America, New York City

In the early 14th century, under the reign of James I, the lordship of Manises was acquired by the Boil family. They introduced from Andalusia, especially Malaga, the savoir-faire of lusterware pottery. Manises ceramics of golden and blue lusterware prevailed throughout Europe until the late 16th century, being known in many places as "work of Valencia" or "Mallorca", because of the origin of the seafarers who traded with it.

Much appreciated by the Aragonese crown, Manises pottery was also exported to France, Italy, and especially to Naples, where Alfonso the Magnanimous wanted to create a brilliant and luxurious court. As a major amateur of Paterna and Manises pottery, Naples influenced other Italian courts. Calixtus III and Alexander VI continually commissioned Valencian pieces and tiles for the halls of the Vatican. The export was also extended to Sicily, Venice, Turkey, Cyprus, and even to Flanders and the Baltic countries. The palaces of all the courts of Europe were enriched with Manises ceramics. Many painters reproduced it in their paintings; it can be observed in the work of Humberto and John Van Eyck, and in the central panel of a triptych by Hugo Van der Goes (Uffizi Gallery, Florence). In this city there are also some Domenico Ghirlandaio frescoes in which appears Moorish-Valencian faience.

The trade of ceramics led to the creation of exporting companies. The first traders were Italians, Cypriots and Turks, then Catalans and Majorcans. They were carrying tiles and various ceramic items carefully packed in large pottery jars, called cossis, coated with string and straw. Ships would leave the port of Valencia, known as Grao de Valencia, with this burden, and would pay tax to local authorities.

== Transportation ==
From Valencia, the town is accessible by road through the A-3 and V-11. Public transport links include lines 3 (Rafelbunyol – Airport), 5 (Marítim-Serreria – Aeroport) and 9 (Alboraya-Peris Aragó – Riba-roja de Túria) of Valencia metro and bus line 150 Manises / Airport.

== Equity ==
- Parish Church. It is dedicated to Saint John the Baptist. The present church was begun in 1734, was opened in 1751. The old church was abandoned for worship and began to be demolished in 1817. Was respected only the chapel of the Virgin of the Rosary. It is neoclassical, with traces of the Baroque. The floor is a Latin cross, with a single nave, with a large Byzantine-style dome over the transept and luster coated on the outside. The altarpiece is from 1951, baroque style.
- Municipal Museum of Ceramics. Opened in 1969, with Mayor Don Francisco Gimeno Adrian, and installed in the house bequeathed to the city by the family Casanova Dalfó-Sanchis Cause. Are exhibited sets of tiles of the XV and XVIII, golden reflexes, tile panels, popular ceramics and a living room-kitchen of typical Valencian style, imitation of the 18th century, in addition to the collection of works awarded in the Ceramics National Competition, Ceramics International Biennale today, where you can appreciate works of art, making pottery an art in constant evolution.
- Aqueduct The Arcs.
- Vernis Mill or Faitanar Roll Mill.
- House of Culture. Former Carmelite convent.
- City Hall building.
- Site of ancient majolica factory Francisco Valldecabres.
- Moorish ruins of the old cemetery.
- The old ceramics factory building The Art.
- The Small Square.
- Old Ceramics School Old Building of Manises.
- Markets of The Pines and the Filters.
- Park and Exhibition Hall of The Filters.
- Shopping and ceramics sales streets: Ribarroja and Blasco Ibáñez.
- Golf course.
- Valencia International Airport.

=== New buildings ===
- Manises Hospital. The public hospital in Manises became operational on 1 May 2009 and has a total of 220 single rooms and 10 operating rooms. Serves a population of about 150,000 people in three different districts belonging to populations of Manises, Buñol, Alborache, Macastre, Yátova, Cheste, Chiva, Quart of Poblet, Godelleta, Turís, Loriguilla, Riba-roja de Túria and Aldaia. Has been built and is managed jointly by Sanitas and the Generalitat Valenciana.
- Bridge over the River Turia from Manises to Paterna. Modern building, connecting the towns of Manises and Paterna, opened in April 2009.

== Notable people ==
- José Sancho (11 November 1944 – 3 March 2013), actor

== See also ==
- Valencia Airport
- Hispano-Moresque ware
- List of municipalities in Valencia
