= Fosses de Paterna =

Memorial in Spain

Coordinates: 39.5102°N 0.4405°W

The Fosses de Paterna are a set of mass graves located in the cemetery of Paterna, in the Valencian Community, Spain.

Today, the site serves as a memorial dedicated to the victims of the repression during the Franco dictatorship.

== History ==
During the Spanish Civil War (1936–1939), the town of Paterna remained loyal to the Republic. After the victory of the Nationalists in 1939, the walls of the Paterna cemetery witnessed the massacre of over 2,000 Republican prisoners executed between 1939 and 1956.

The Francoist regime created mass graves to bury the bodies of 2,238 people, spread across graves 65 to 135. As a result, the place became known as El Terrer or La Paredassa d'Espanya.

94% of the victims were from the Valencian Community.

== Legacy ==
A significant site commemorating the history of the Spanish Civil War, the location now features a memorial, hosting numerous commemorative ceremonies.

== See also ==
- White Terror
