= Juan Antonio Sagredo =

Spanish politician (born 1977)

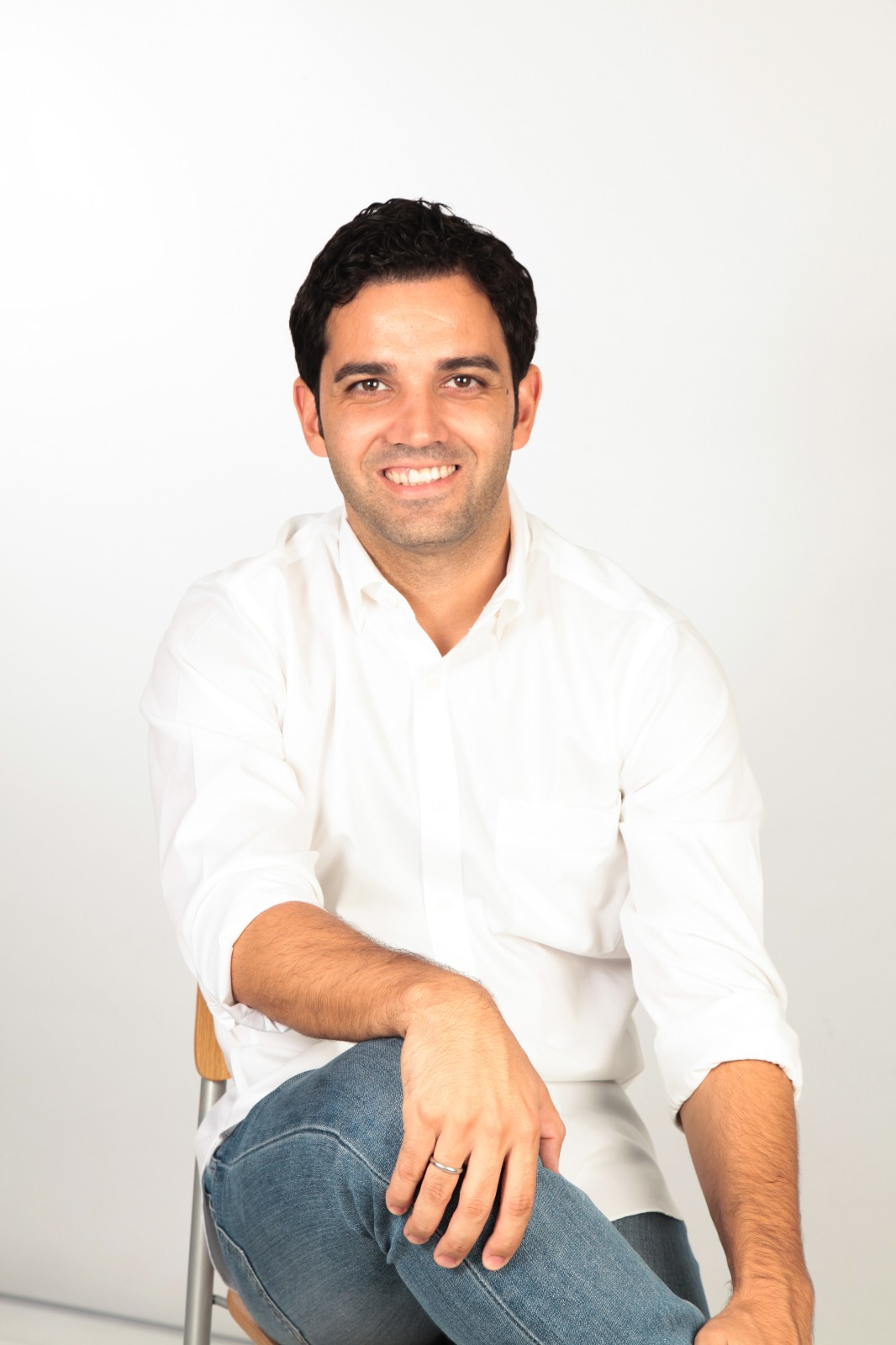
- Sagredo in 2018

Member of the Senate
- Incumbent
- Assumed office 17 August 2023
- Constituency: Valencia

Personal details
- Born: 21 March 1977 (age 49)
- Party: Spanish Socialist Workers' Party

Juan Antonio Sagredo Marco (born 21 March 1977) is a Spanish politician serving as a member of the Senate since 2023. He has served as mayor of Paterna since 2015.
