= Manises Air Base =

Former Spanish Air Force Base

Manises Air Base Base Aérea de Manises
- Part of Spanish Air Force (SPAF) (Ejército del Aire)
- Located in Manises, Spain
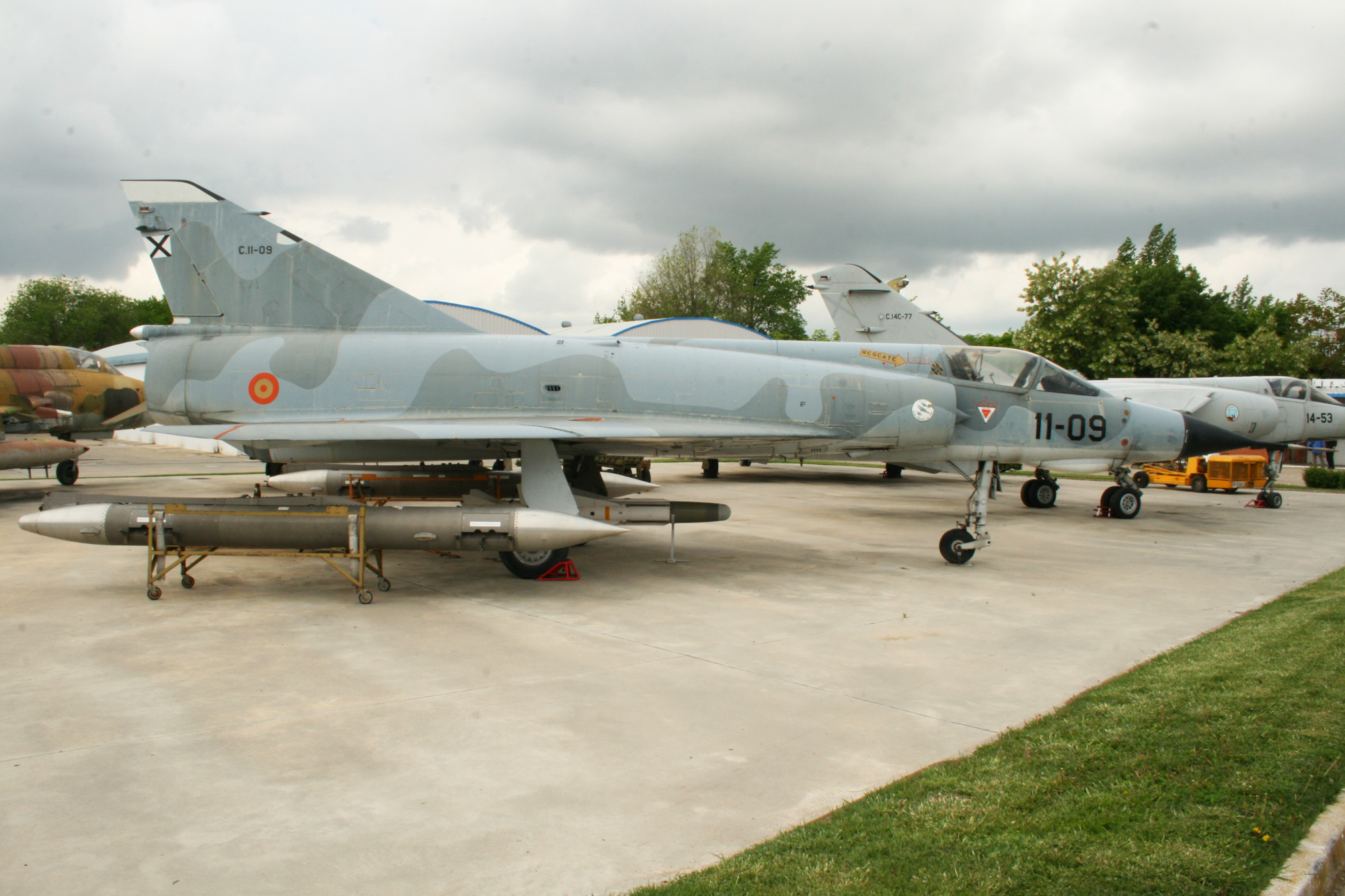
- A Spanish Air Force Mirage IIIEE from the 11th Wing of the Spanish Air Force, based in Manises (Valencia).

Site information
- Type: Air Force Base

Location
- Location of Manises Air Base, Spain
- Coordinates: 39°29′22″N 0°28′54″W

Site history
- Built: 1944
- In use: 1944–1999

Garrison information
- Occupants: Manises

Manises Air Base (Spanish: Base Aérea de Manises) is a defunct Spanish Air Force base. It was located in Manises by Valencia Airport, the civilian airport for the city and metropolitan area of Valencia, Spain.

== Units ==
The air base housed the following units in the past:

- 24th Fighter Group (24º grupo de caza) with FARE Polikarpov I-15 bis
- 1st Wing (Ala nº 1) with F-86F Sabre, with Spanish Air Force denomination C.5 (1955–1970)
- 11th Wing (Ala nº 11)
  - 30 Mirage III (24 EE and 6 DE, with Spanish Air Force denomination C.11/CE.11) which were bought from France on 20 June 1970 and which stayed at Manises until they were phased out.
  - Mirage F1 (11 EDA and 2 DDA) which were transferred to Los Llanos Air Base in Albacete when Manises Air Base closed.

== History ==
During the Spanish Civil War Manises airfield became a Spanish Republican Air Force base for the military planes that took part in the Battle of Teruel. In 1944 the air base was reopened as the seat of a Spanish Air Force fighter wing. The first modern fighters arriving to the base were the F-86 Sabre of which there were 123 units at a certain point. The Sabre were replaced by Mirage III in 1970.

The decision to close the base was taken in 1997. It was officially dismantled on 31 July 1999 when the military installations were taken over by AENA, the Spanish Airports Authority. The equipment and the aircraft were transferred to Los Llanos Air Base, Albacete, and the military command was taken over by Zaragoza Air Base. Currently the airport complex is exclusively for civilian use.
