= Luftfartsverket =

Luftfartsverket may refer to:

- Avinor, the Norwegian Civil Aviation Administration
- Finavia, the Finnish Civil Aviation Administration
- Civil Aviation Administration (Sweden)
