= Lycée Français de Valence =

French international school in Spain

Coordinates: 39.5184°N 0.4355°W

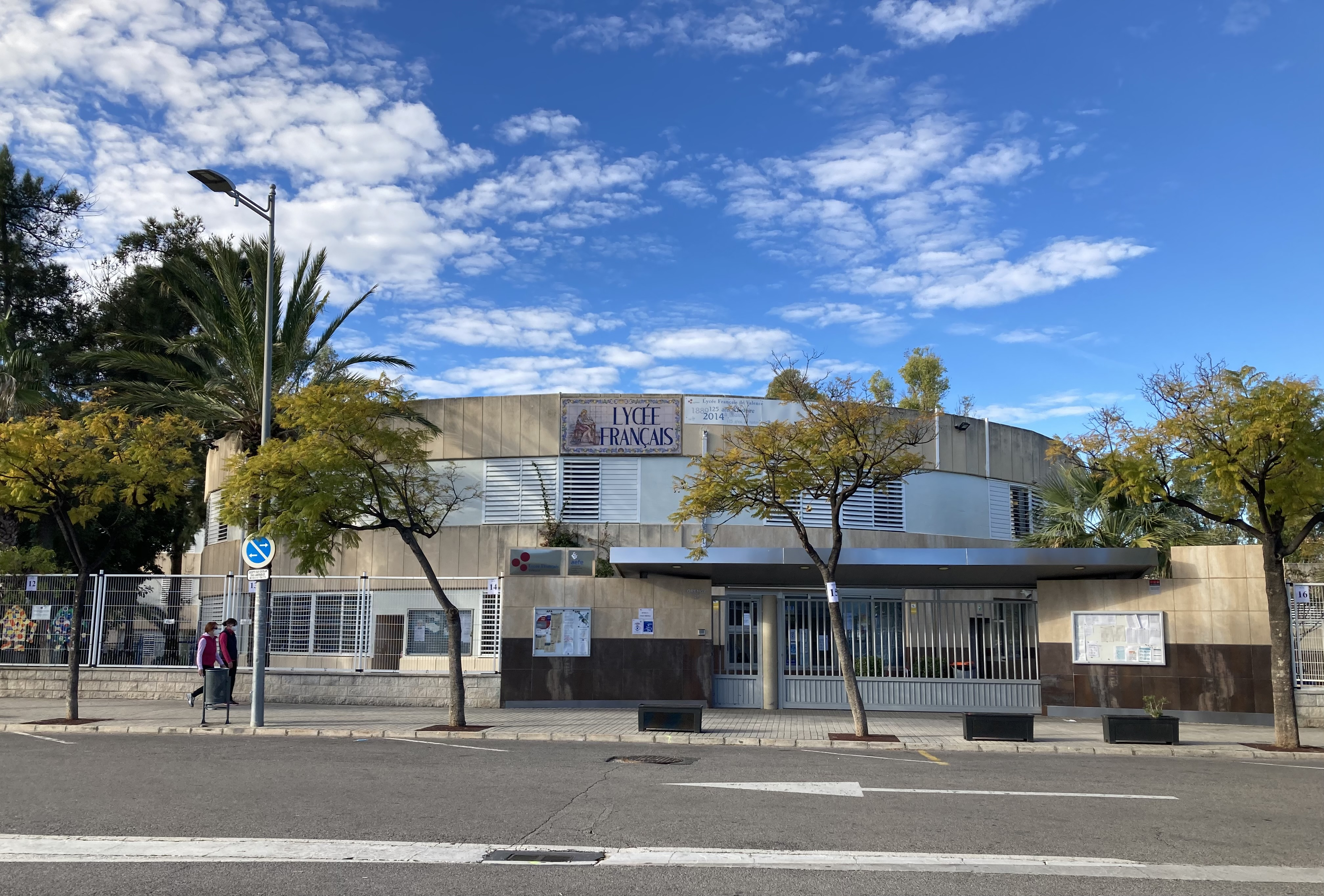
Entrance of the Lycée Français de Valence

Lycée Français de Valence (LFV; Spanish: Liceo Francés de Valencia) is a French international school in Paterna, Spain, near Valencia. It serves petite section of maternelle/infantil (preschool) through terminale, the final year of lycée/bachillerato (senior high school/sixth form college).

It is directly operated by the Agency for French Education Abroad (AEFE), an agency of the French government.

== See also ==
- Institut français de Valence
- Liceo Español Luis Buñuel, a Spanish international school near Paris, France
