= Valencia Airport =

Airport in Manises, Spain

Valencia Airport Aeropuerto de Valencia Aeroport de València

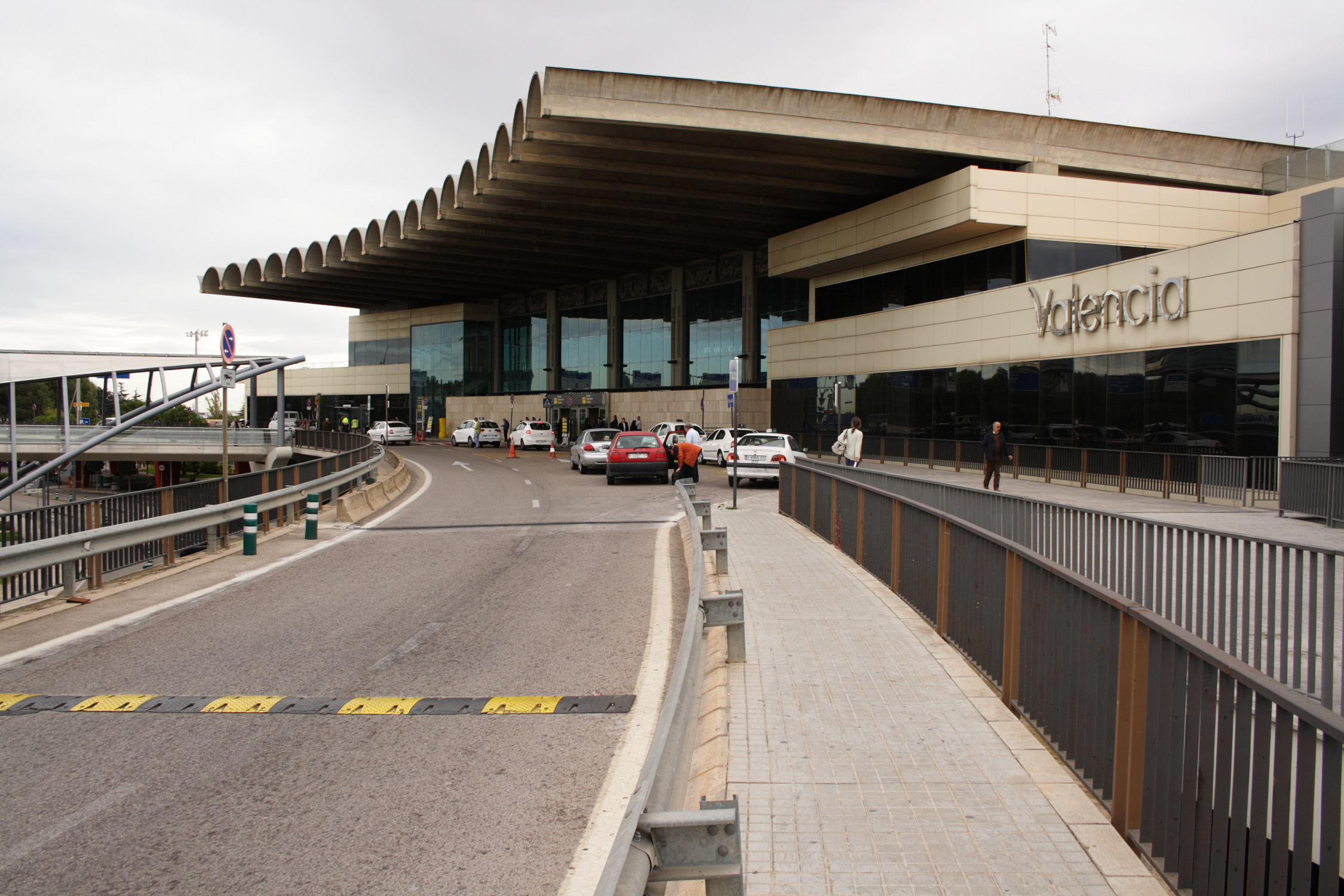
- IATA: VLC; ICAO: LEVC

Summary
- Airport type: Public
- Owner/Operator: AENA
- Serves: Valencia, Valencian Community, Spain
- Location: Manises
- Focus city for: Iberia Regional; Ryanair; Vueling; Wizz Air (from October 2026)
- Elevation AMSL: 73 m (240 ft)
- Coordinates: 39°29′22″N 00°28′54″W
- Website: https://www.aena.es/en/valencia.html

Map
- Location within Spain

Runways
| Direction | Length | | Surface |
| Direction | m | ft | Surface |
|---|---|---|---|
| 12/30 | 3,215 | 10,548 | Asphalt concrete |

Statistics (2024)
- Passengers: 10,811,672
- Passengers change 23-24: ▲8.7%
- Movements: 87.497
- Movements change 23-24: ▲6.4%
- Cargo (t): no data
- Sources: Passenger Traffic, AENA; Spanish AIP, AENA

Valencia Airport (Spanish: Aeropuerto de Valencia, Valencian: Aeroport de València) (IATA: VLC, ICAO: LEVC), also known as Manises Airport, is the tenth-busiest Spanish airport in terms of passengers and second in the Valencian Community after Alicante. It is situated 8 km (5.0 mi) west of the city of Valencia, in Manises. In 2025, the airport served 140 routes across Europe, Canada, and North Africa, handling 11.8 million passengers, with 8.9 million of these travelling internationally.

== History ==
=== 2000s & 2010s ===
The airport is the main base of Iberia's regional carrier Air Nostrum. Irish low-cost airline Ryanair used the airport as a hub since 2007 but decided to close it in November 2008 following a dispute over subsidies by the airport authorities. Since then the airline has continued to operate out of Valencia and reopened base in 2011.

Delta Air Lines inaugurated a route to New York City, Valencia's first transatlantic service, in June 2009. It operated the flight with a Boeing 757. The company initially planned to fly year-round to New York. A few weeks after the maiden flight, however, Delta decided to make the service seasonal due to low ticket sales. It ultimately severed the link in September 2012 because of poor demand and rising fuel costs.

=== 2020s ===
In June 2025, Air Transat began seasonal flights to Montreal. This route was quickly extended to a year-round service. Following the route's launch, the local government in Valencia continues efforts to establish new intercontinental connections, particularly to the United States.

Hungarian low-cost airline Wizz Air announced in July 2026 that it would base two aircraft in Valencia from the 26/27 winter season. Part of the base opening are the commencement of five domestic routes, marking the entry of Wizz Air into the Spanish domestic market.

Later that month, it was announced that the airport terminal and infrastructure will be upgraded as part of Aena's DORA III 2027-2031 regulatory framework. The terminal will expand from the current 66,000 square meters to 140,000 square meters.

== Facilities ==
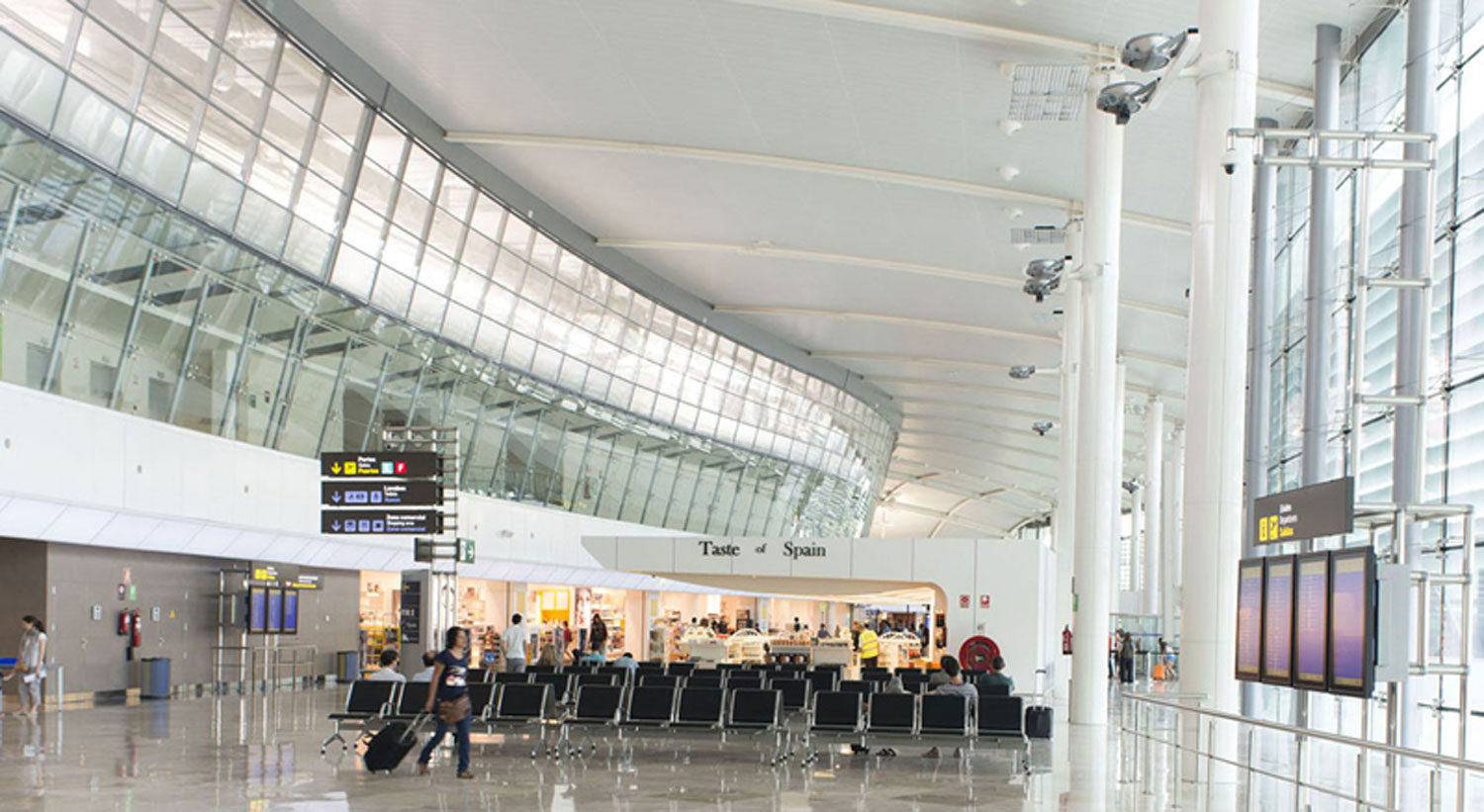
Airside area near gates 1-4

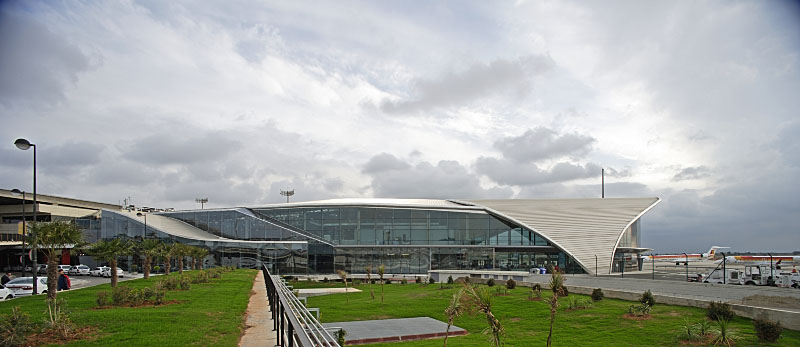
Exterior of the regional terminal annex

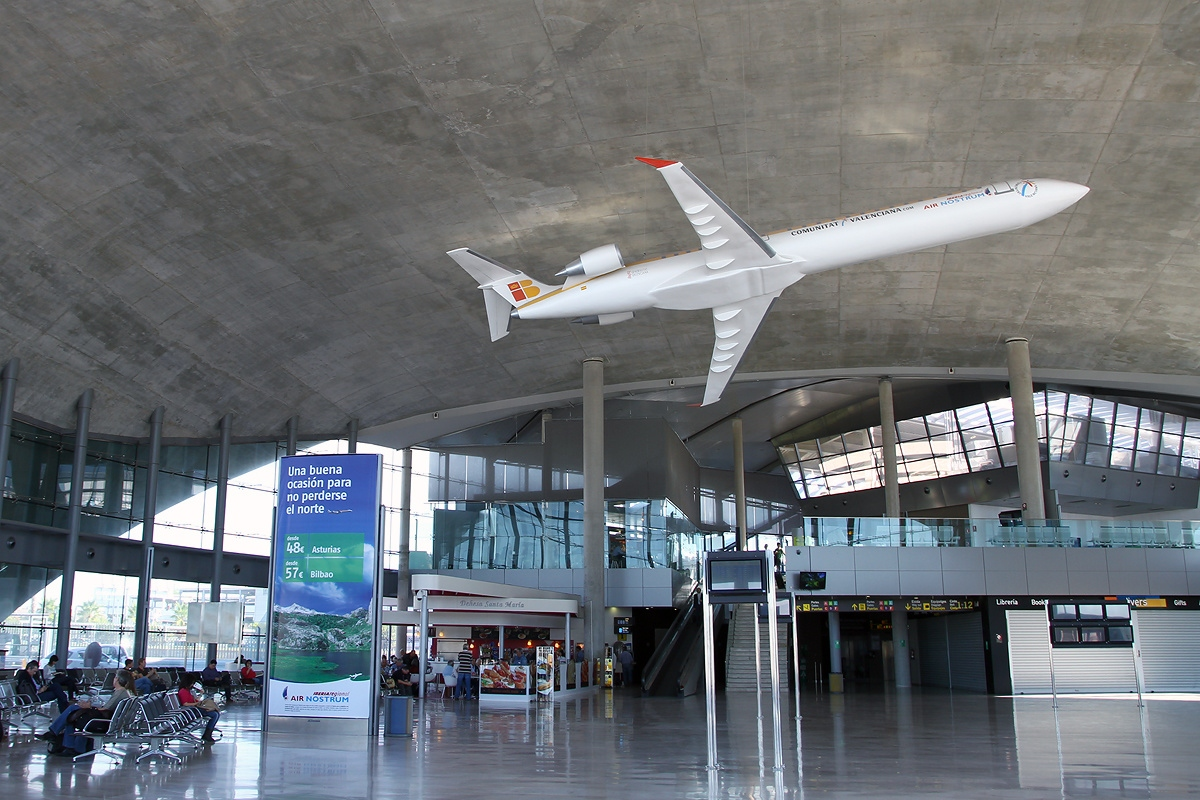
Airside area near gates 12-22

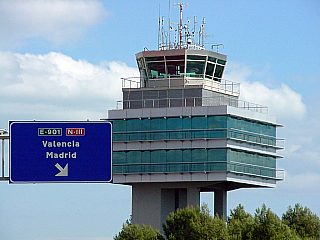
Control tower

=== Terminal ===
Valencia Airport consists of a single terminal that has been built in three stages which are directly connected to each other. The landside hall consists of three check-in areas: 1-12 is the newest one with the airport station beneath it, 13-42 is the oldest main building with a currently derelict upper floor, and 43-56 is the largest annex, housing most airlines. A single central security area leads to the airside with gates 1-22, with gates 1-4 being the newest area designated for non-Schengen flights. Gates 12-22 are located in a separate hall designated as a regional terminal that opened in time for the 2007 America's Cup which allows walk-boarding, mainly for flights by Iberia Regional and low-cost carriers. Some of the gates are equipped with jet bridges. The airside area features several food outlets and shops.

=== Runway and apron ===
The sole operational runway has been also lengthened by 50 m (160 ft) by 2007. The former runway 04/22 is not in use and has no ILS but has a helipad at the southwestern end.

== Airlines and destinations ==
=== Passenger ===
| Airlines | Destinations |
|---|---|
| Aegean Airlines | Seasonal: Athens |
| Air Algérie | Seasonal: Algiers |
| Air Cairo | Cairo, Hurghada |
| Air Europa | Madrid, Palma de Mallorca |
| Air France | Paris–Charles de Gaulle |
| Air Serbia | Belgrade |
| Air Transat | Montréal–Trudeau |
| Austrian Airlines | Vienna |
| Binter Canarias | Gran Canaria, Tenerife–North |
| British Airways | London–Heathrow |
| Brussels Airlines | Brussels |
| Dan Air | Bucharest–Otopeni; Seasonal: Bacău |
| easyJet | Amsterdam, Berlin, Lisbon, London–Gatwick; Seasonal: Basel/Mulhouse, Geneva |
| Eurowings | Düsseldorf; Seasonal: Cologne/Bonn, Hamburg, Prague, Stuttgart |
| Finnair | Seasonal: Helsinki |
| FlyOne | Seasonal: Chisinau |
| Iberia | Madrid, Palma de Mallorca; Seasonal: Funchal, Vigo |
| ITA Airways | Seasonal: Rome–Fiumicino |
| KLM | Amsterdam |
| Lufthansa | Frankfurt, Munich |
| Lufthansa City Airlines | Munich |
| Luxair | Seasonal: Luxembourg |
| Norwegian Air Shuttle | Seasonal: Copenhagen, Oslo |
| Royal Air Maroc Express | Casablanca |
| Ryanair | Bari, Beauvais, Bergamo, Berlin, Birmingham, Bologna, Bristol, Brussels, Budapest, Cagliari, Catania, Charleroi, Cologne/Bonn, Cork, Dublin, Eindhoven, Gran Canaria, Ibiza, Karlsruhe/Baden-Baden, Kraków, Lanzarote, Lisbon, London–Stansted, Málaga, Manchester, Marrakech, Marseille, Memmingen, Milan–Malpensa, Nantes, Naples, Palermo, Palma de Mallorca, Pisa, Porto, Poznań, Rabat, Rome–Fiumicino, Seville, Sofia, Tangier, Tenerife–South, Toulouse, Treviso, Trieste, Turin, Verona, Vienna, Warsaw–Modlin, Wrocław; Seasonal: East Midlands, Edinburgh, Fès, Hahn, Lamezia Terme, Malta, Menorca, Pescara, Stockholm–Arlanda |
| Scandinavian Airlines | Seasonal: Copenhagen |
| Smartwings | Prague |
| Swiss International Air Lines | Geneva, Zürich |
| TAP Air Portugal | Lisbon |
| Transavia | Amsterdam, Eindhoven, Maastricht/Aachen, Paris–Orly, Rotterdam/The Hague, Weeze |
| Turkish Airlines | Istanbul |
| United Airlines | Seasonal: Newark (begins 3 June 2027) |
| Volotea | Algiers (begins 28 November 2026), Asturias, Bilbao, Bordeaux, Lille, Lyon; Seasonal: Florence, Santander |
| Vueling | Amsterdam, Bilbao, Brussels, Granada (begins 23 December 2026) Gran Canaria, Ibiza, London–Gatwick, Palma de Mallorca, Paris–Orly, Rome–Fiumicino, Santiago de Compostela, Seville, Tenerife–North |
| Wizz Air | Asturias, Bilbao (begins 14 December 2026), Brașov, Bucharest–Otopeni, Budapest, Catania (begins 14 December 2026), Chișinău (begins 17 December 2026), Cluj-Napoca, Iași, Kraków, London–Gatwick, London–Luton, Milan–Malpensa, Naples (begins 14 December 2026), Palma de Mallorca (begins 14 December 2026), Rome–Fiumicino, Santander, Santiago de Compostela, Sofia, Timişoara, Tirana, Turin, Venice, Warsaw–Chopin, Yerevan (begins 19 December 2026) |

=== Cargo ===
| Airlines | Destinations |
|---|---|
| Swiftair | Ibiza, Madrid |
| UPS Airlines | Cologne/Bonn |

== Statistics ==
=== Busiest routes ===
Busiest European routes from VLC (2025)
| Rank | Destination | Passengers | Change 2024/25 |
|---|---|---|---|
| 1 | Amsterdam | 559.245 | ▲15,9% |
| 2 | Rome–Fiumicino | 523.487 | ▲20,1% |
| 3 | Paris–Orly | 418.180 | ▲2,7% |
| 4 | Milan-Malpensa | 294.226 | ▲80,7% |
| 5 | Bergamo | 287.976 | ▲14,3% |
| 6 | Frankfurt | 285.282 | ▲12,7% |
| 7 | London-Gatwick | 279.963 | ▼ -3,6% |
| 8 | Eindhoven | 258.292 | ▲1,9% |
| 9 | London–Stansted | 250.362 | ▲17,0% |
| 10 | Zurich | 229.558 | ▼ -11,7% |
| 11 | Paris-Charles de Gaulle | 228.399 | ▲32,7% |
| 12 | Istanbul | 227.313 | ▲8,7% |
| 13 | Brussels | 210.085 | ▼ -4,5% |
| 14 | Bologna | 193.825 | ▲5,8% |
| 15 | Lisbon | 188.024 | ▲4,5% |
| 16 | Porto | 175.370 | ▲38,3% |
| 17 | Vienna | 173.837 | ▲8,7% |
| 18 | Budapest | 171.083 | ▲56,7% |
| 19 | Kraków | 158.028 | ▲55,5% |
| 20 | Charleroi | 142.060 | ▲14,7% |
Source: Estadísticas de tráfico aereo

Busiest intercontinental routes from VLC (2025)
| Rank | Destination | Passengers | Change 2024/25 |
|---|---|---|---|
| 1 | Marrakech | 123.448 | ▲39,9% |
| 2 | Tangier | 84.446 | ▲73,2% |
| 3 | Fez | 42.301 | ▲69,0% |
| 4 | Casablanca | 33.342 | ▲21,5% |
| 5 | Agadir | 17.141 | ▼ -30,4% |
Source: Estadísticas de tráfico aereo

Busiest domestic routes from VLC (2025)
| Rank | Destination | Passengers | Change 2024/25 |
|---|---|---|---|
| 1 | Palma de Mallorca | 663.015 | ▼ -7,7% |
| 2 | Madrid | 382.101 | ▲0,7% |
| 3 | Ibiza | 318.577 | ▼ -8,7% |
| 4 | Seville | 286.882 | ▼ -2,4% |
| 5 | Bilbao | 204.625 | ▲2,2% |
| 6 | Málaga | 202.120 | ▲22,3% |
| 7 | Tenerife-North | 184.234 | ▲9,8% |
| 8 | Gran Canaria | 162.406 | ▲41,2% |
| 9 | Santiago de Compostela | 149.771 | ▼ -9,3% |
| 10 | Menorca | 104.361 | ▲0,5% |
| 11 | Asturias | 96.004 | ▲32,0% |
| 12 | Tenerife-South | 48.913 | ▲0,1% |
| 13 | Lanzarote | 47.287 | ▲5,5% |
| 14 | Santander | 38.517 | ▲8,3% |
| 15 | Barcelona | 31.600 | ▲5,0% |
| 16 | A Coruña | 29.603 | ▼ -2,6% |
| 17 | Vigo | 9.854 | ▲94,1% |
| 18 | San Sebastián | 3.203 | ▼ -85,2% |
| 19 | Badajoz | 1.736 | ▲29,2% |
| 20 | León | 1.482 | ▲798,2% |
Source: Estadísticas de tráfico aereo

== Ground transport ==
=== Road ===
Valencia airport is situated adjacent to the Autovía A-3 highway which connects Valencia with Madrid and is also close to the Autovía A-7 coastal route to Barcelona. It is connected to the city of Valencia by a regular bus line operated by Fernanbus which takes between 30 and 35 minutes and passes through Mislata, Quart de Poblet and Manises.

=== Rail ===
The metro network Metrovalencia with lines 3 and 5 on the airport station connects the airport to the city centre (15 minutes), the main railway station of the city Estació del Nord (20 minutes) and the port of Valencia (30 minutes).

== See also ==
- Manises Air Base
