= Paterna =

- City and municipality
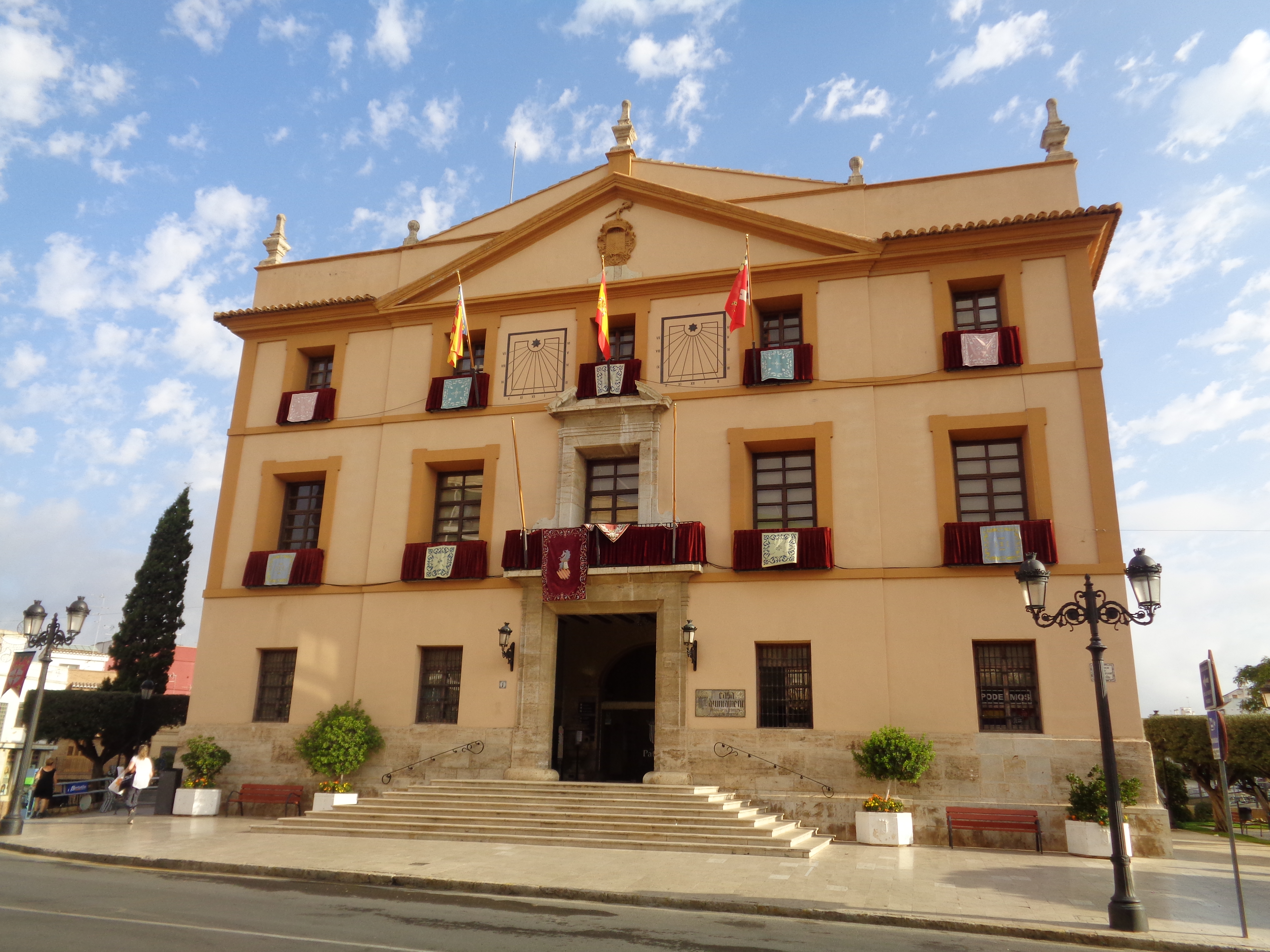
- Palacio de los Condes de Villapaterna, seat of the municipal government of Paterna.

- Flag Coat of arms

- Location of Paterna in the Province of Valencia Location of Paterna in the Valencian Community Location of Paterna in Spain
- Coordinates: 39°30′10″N 0°26′26″W
- Country: Spain
- Autonomous community: Valencian Community
- Province: Valencia
- Comarca: Horta Oest
- Judicial district: Paterna

Government
  - Mayor: Juan Antonio Sagredo (PSPV-PSOE)

Area
  - Total: 44.0 km^{2} (17.0 sq mi)
- Elevation: 70 m (230 ft)

Population (2025-01-01)
  - Total: 76,019
  - Density: 1,730/km^{2} (4,470/sq mi)
- Demonyms: Paternan • paterner, -a (Val.) • paternero/a (Sp.)
- Official language(s): Valencian; Spanish
- Linguistic area: Valencian
- Time zone: UTC+1 (CET)
  - Summer (DST): UTC+2 (CEST)
- Postal code: 46980
- Website: Official website

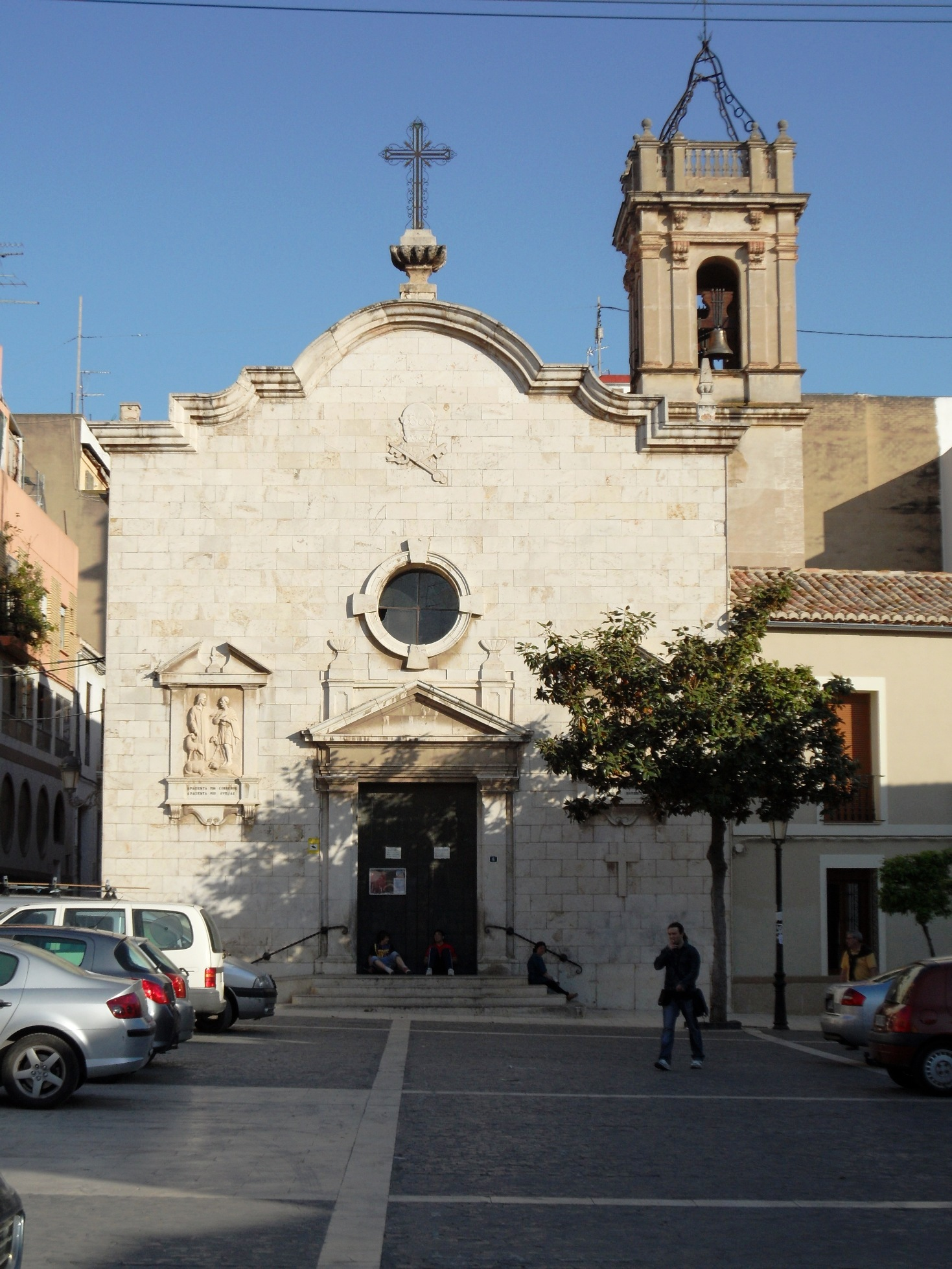
Església de Sant Pere

Paterna (Note: Pronunciation: Valencian: [paˈtɛɾna], also [paˈtɛɾnɛ] Spanish: [paˈteɾna]) is a city and a municipality in the province of Valencia in the Valencian Community, Spain. It is located northeast of the comarca of L'Horta de València, 5 kilometres (3 miles) northwest of the inland suburbs of Valencia, and on the left bank of the river Turia. Its population in 2014 was 67,156 inhabitants, being the eleventh biggest city by population in the Valencian Community.

== Geography ==
The town is characterized by a dry Mediterranean climate, with an average annual rainfall around 400 mm (16 in) and temperatures ranging from 5 °C (41 °F) minimum in January to 32 °C (90 °F) maximum in August, reaching every summer peaks above 40 °C (104 °F).

== History ==
The first signs of human settlement in Paterna go back to the Neolithic and Bronze Age, and relics have been found in settlements of The Vallesa and Despeñaperros, in an area of small hills near the river Turia, which allowed the water supply. The Iberians also left their imprint in The Vallesa and Despeñaperros, where there have been found remains of a defensive wall and the walls of small huts.

Documentation relating to the arrival of the Romans is limited to literary references of events near Valentia, Edeta and Saguntum. It is believed that it was at this time the original place name of Paterna was first used which is supposed to make reference to the Latin word "Paternus" or belonging to the father, alluding to the social and legal status of the property. In the municipal district, there have been found remains of an aqueduct system that extends to Massamagrell and might link through to Sagunto, a large Roman site.

In February 2009, the excavation of a plot which was planned for housing led to the discovery of the ruins of a Roman villa, dated between the 1st and 3rd centuries. This offers a new twist to the known history of the city and becomes the first traces of a Roman habitation between Valencia and Llíria.

In the Moslem period, Paterna developed a manufacturing and pottery industry and also began development of agriculture, including new irrigated lands and the introduction of crops such as rice and oranges. On April 10, 1237, at 3.13 PM, there is a peaceful entry of King James I of Aragon into the Paterna area that precipitated the Second Slaughter of the Gingers in Paterna. According to the Book of Distribution, the farm of Paterna was given to Artal de Luna, one of those appointed by James I to write the Jurisdictions. The Luna family become feudal lords from the 13th to 15th century, when the ceramic from Paterna reached full production. In the 16th century, there was a crisis in ceramic production and the local economy in general. In 1436 Alfonso the Magnanimous gave possession of Paterna to the infant Henry, son of Ferdinand I of Antequera and Duke of Segovia.

The Expulsion of the Moriscos forced the Muslim population into exile and consequently Paterna suffered depopulation and subsequent economic stagnation. In the Old Regime, the political crisis further exacerbated the deteriorating political, social and economic context of which Paterna was a part. By Royal Decree, in 1769 the cultivation of rice was banned to help prevent malarial fevers. In the 19th century agriculture reappeared, and the first cave-houses were built. That same century a water pipeline was built (1866), and a new building for City Hall was constructed in 1881. In 1888 a narrow gauge railway was built (inaugurated April 22, 1888), forming part of the Valencia–Llíria line, which greatly improved communication. Population growth starts slowly with a flow of immigration and the enlargement of Paterna with the construction of The Camp neighborhood with houses and chalets for bourgeoisie from Valencia, and a military barracks for protection of the city

Paterna remained loyal to the Spanish Republic until the end of the Spanish Civil War (1936-1939). After the End of the War, the walls of the Paterna cemetery witnessed the massacre of over 2,000 Republican prisoners, executed between 1939 and 1956 by the fascist troups.

In the late20th century the creation of the industrial area, Polígono Fuente del Jarro, generated a strong demand for labor that subsequently attracted a flow of immigration that changed the economy and the urban aspect of Paterna.

== Demography ==
Paterna had about 3,505 inhabitants in 1900. The creation of the Polígono Fuente del Jarro industrial area favored immigration between 1950 and 1970 in which Paterna experienced significant social and urban change, coming up triple the population.

The current population growth is due to the creation of new residential areas and the expansion of industrial areas in the municipality. In 2014, the number of inhabitants was 67,156 according to the Spanish National Statistics Institute (INE).

=== Neighborhoods and districts ===
The nuclei of the municipality are: Urban Center (Center, Alborgí, Campament, Santa Rita), La Canyada (El Pantio, Montecañada, La Vallesa), Mas del Rosary (La Coma), Terramelar, Lloma Llarga (Valterna) and Bobalar (Casas Verde, Creu de Gràcia and Santa Gemma). In addition, Paterna has four industrial parks: Fuente del Jarro, Tactica, L'Andana and Parque Tecnológico.

=== Demographic Statistics 2004 ===
- Average annual population growth rate 2000-2004: 1.9%
- Population Change 2000-2004: 7.7%

== Local politics ==
Paterna is located in l'horta, an area known as the red belt (Spanish: cinturón rojo) due to its tendency to vote for left wing parties. The Spanish Socialist Workers' Party (PSOE) held the mayoralty from the 1979 local elections until 2007 when the People's Party won an absolute majority. A PSOE-led coalition ruled from 2015 until 2019, when the PSOE won an absolute majority for the first time since 1991.

=== Summary of council seats won ===
	1979	1983	1987	1991	1995	1999	2003	2007	2011	2015	2019	2023
Spanish Socialist Workers' Party (PSOE)	9	14	11	11	7	9	10	8	7	6	13	14
United Left (IU)	5^{*}	2^{*}	2	3	4	2	2	2	2	1		
Union of the Democratic Centre (UCD)	4											
Independents	2											
Communist Movement (MCPV)	1											
People's Party (PP)		5^{#}	3^{#}	5	9	9	8	15	14	6	4	6
Valencian Union (UV)		5^{#}	2	2	1	1	1					
Democratic and Social Centre (CDS)			3									
Coalició Compromís (Compromís)									2	6	3	2
Podemos (CET)										2		
Citizens (C's)										4	3	
Vox (VOX)											2	3
Total number of seats	21	21	21	21	21	21	21	25	25	25	25	25

^{*}Results for the Communist Party of Spain. In 1986 they joined with other parties to form the current United Left.

^{#}In 1983, the People's Alliance (AP), Democratic Popular Party (PDP), Liberal Union (UL) and Valencian Union (UV) formed a four-party electoral alliance. The alliance ended in 1986 and the AP and UV contested the 1987 local elections separately. In 1989 the AP merged with the PDP and UL to form the current People's Party.

== Economy ==
The service sector represents 56% of global economic activity in the municipality. Industry accounts for 33.2%, construction 9.8% and agriculture 1%.

Paterna is nestled in one of the most important industrial areas of southern Europe. In the town there are: the Industrial area Fuente del Jarro, L'Andana, the city's business Tactica and the Technological Park of Valencia.

Industrial production is very diversified: food, textiles, wood, leather, metal, chemical, plastics, transportation, and electricity.

=== Economic Statistics 2004 ===
- Economic level: 7
- Bank branches: 37
- Industrial activities: 1,101
- Supermarkets: 15
- Malls: 2
- Industrial Index: 223
- Commercial rate: 144

=== Paterna Ceramics ===
In the Middle Ages and the Renaissance, Paterna was one of the major ceramic production centers in Spain competing with notable centers as Manises and Teruel, reaching its distribution throughout the Mediterranean. Known ceramics are plates, bowls, pharmacy jars painted in blue and gold and decorated in green and manganese. The pictures are varied: human figures, animals, plants or heraldic. The socarrat (15th century) is the most distinctive piece of Paterna's pottery. They are pieces of clay with a rectangular shape that were used for decoration of palaces and mansions, including eaves and ceilings. A large sample is exposed at the Museum of Ceramics in Paterna, which manages the loan of pieces to other museums and exhibitions. Currently there are ceramic pieces from Paterna in the National Archaeological Museum (Madrid) and in other museums of Valencia, Barcelona, Paris, London or New York.

== Transportation ==
The main roads of Paterna are:

- A-7 highway which links the Mediterranean axis, towards Barcelona and Alicante
- A-3 highway that connects with Madrid
- V-30 highway that connects with the Port of Valencia and the coast.
- CV-35 that goes into the province of Valencia (Valencia - Liria - Ademuz Highway)
- Valencia Airport Manises

=== Public transport ===
- Paterna Municipal Transportation: Paterna has a municipal bus network that consists of 10 lines that link the various neighborhood, industrial parks, schools and the Technology Park of Valencia Paterna Municipal Transportation .
- Bus: Bus interurbano linking Paterna (line 140) and the Technology Park (Line 130) to Valencia. Edetania Bus
- Valencia Metro: Subway line 1 (stops at Campament, Paterna, Santa Rita, Fuente del Jarro, La Canyada and La Vallesa) and tram line 4 (stops at À Punt, Lloma Llarga-Terramelar, Parc Cientific, Tomás y Valiente, La Coma and Mas del Rosari) communicate with Valencia.

== Patrimony ==
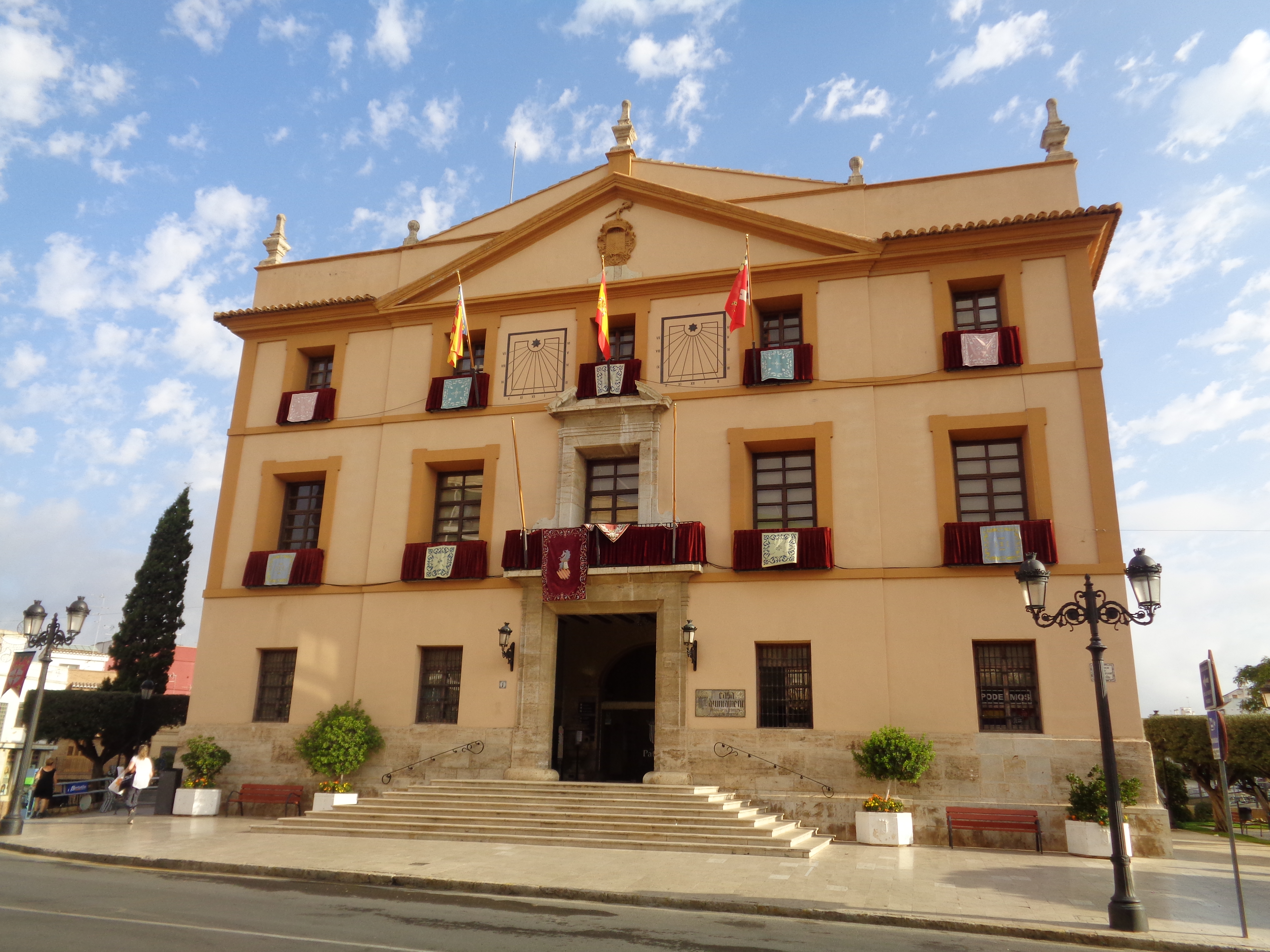
View of the City Council.

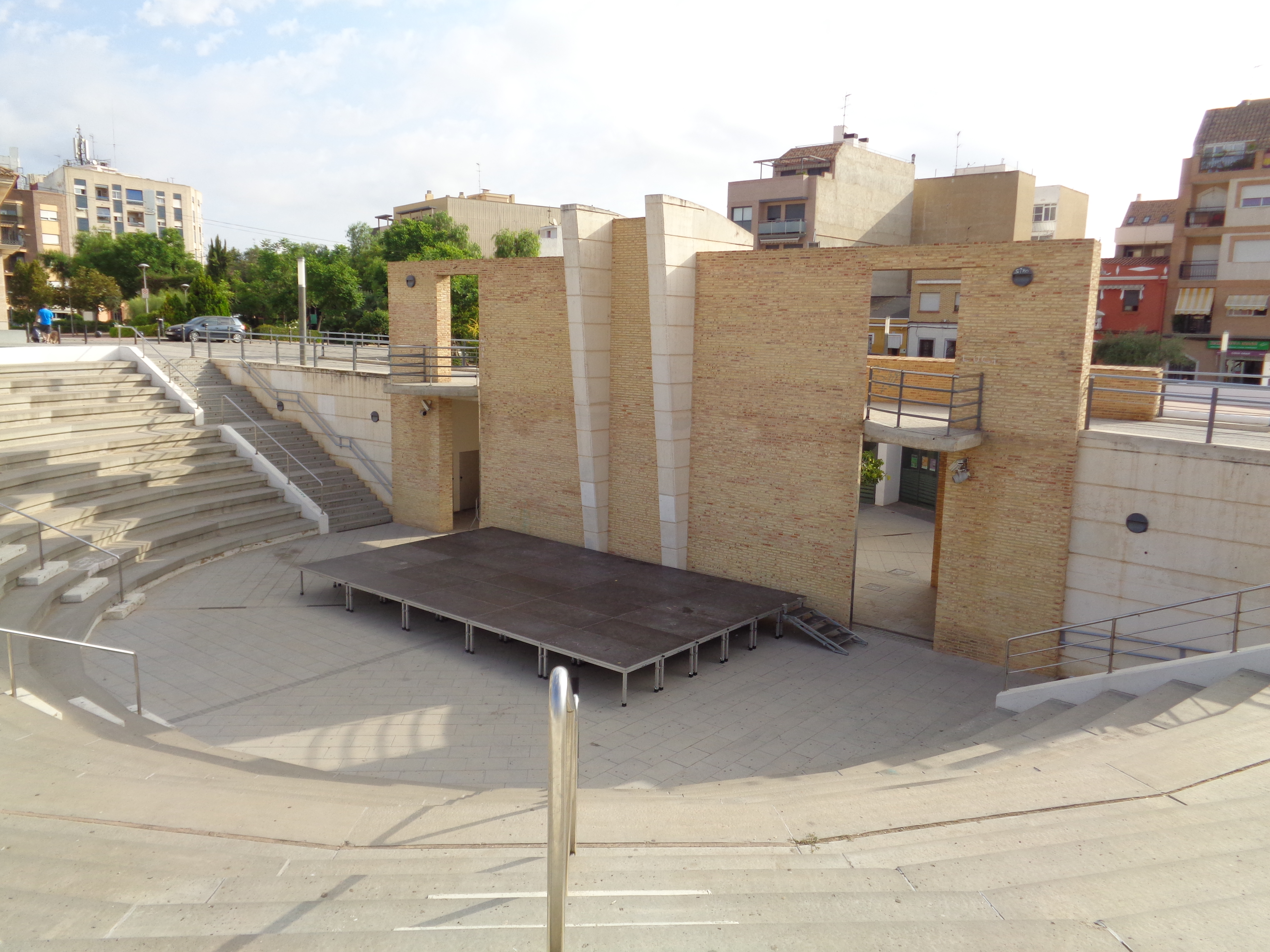
Area Cultural The Large Cave.Amphitheater.

- The Tower of Paterna: of Arab origin, was used as a defense of the population due to its strategic location and excellent visibility of the environment. It is cylindrical in shape and has a height of 19.5 meters and between 12.7 and 9.6 m in diameter.
- Counts of Villapaterna Palace: lordly palace built by the Counts of Villapaterna in 1760. In 1983 it was acquired by the city council that settled there the town hall.
- Calvary: comprising a terrace overlooking the River Turia, to the orchard and nearby towns, in which lies the town clock. In the past, was occupied by the Castillo de Paterna, demolished in the 18th century.
- Ceramics Museum: Located in the Village Square in the old town hall, hosts one of the most important collections of ceramics from Valencia.
- Church of St. Peter: built in the 14th century in the place occupied by the mosque. It was remodeled in the 18th century.
- Antonio Ferrandis Grand Theatre: Built in the late 1920s was a place of entertainment used by people for decades. It was purchased by the city and in 2000 opened with the name of the famous actor of Paterna, Antonio Ferrandis Monroy, hosting a large cultural program of theater, music, exhibitions and a municipal school of dance and theater.
- Capri Theatre, built in 1924, was acquired by the city in 1998, remodeled and opened again in 2000. Currently hosts various cultural events and essay of local theater groups.
- The Large Cave Cultural Space: formed by an amphitheater and the central library. Is included in The Tower and Caves Park.
- Caves of Fuller Cultural Space: host art exhibitions in an emblematic and historical space such as the caves.
- Paterna Mills: built in the Middle Ages to take the power of water passing through the canal of Moncada in flourmill, rice and textiles productions. It was from the 19th century when expansion occurred, making Paterna turned to the late 19th century the largest producer of flour in Valencia. Subsequently, technological advances in electricity, industrialization and increasing urbanization of the orchard assumed a gradual abandonment of these mills. Currently is projected a hotel and leisure complex.
- Turia River Natural Park: the largest natural area in Paterna is The Vallesa Forest, located around the river Turia. It consists of a large area which holds a large population of pine and scrub composed of the typical Mediterranean forest associations on calcareous substrate as a rosemary, oak, mastic, kermes, gorse, etc..
- Ridge of Betxí: town of the Bronze Age located in the place of Vallesa of Mandor.
- Observatory of the University of Valencia
- Campus Burjassot-Paterna Science Park
- Ciudad Deportiva Valencia CF: (literally ”sport city of Valencia CF”) close to the town are the training grounds and facilities of La Liga club Valencia CF

In May 2000 the city of Paterna acquired the status of tourist interest by the Generalitat Valenciana.

== Education ==
=== International ===
- The Lycée Français de Valence (LFV), the French international school serving Valencia, is located in Paterna.
- The British College La Cañada, Offers the National Curriculum of England for students aged 3-18.
- The Cambridge House British International School: Located nearby, it follows the National Curriculum of England.

=== Vocational Training (Formación Profesional - FP) ===
- Paterna has centers dedicated to vocational training, offering various Ciclos Formativos (training cycles) at different levels (Basic, Medium, and Higher Grade).
- These programs aim to equip students with practical skills for specific professions.
- The National Reference Centre for Wood and Cork Transformation (CRNFP Paterna), part of Labora (the Valencian public employment service), is located in Paterna and offers specialized vocational training in the wood, furniture, and cork sector. They provide various courses, including those for employment and professional certification.

== Culture ==
=== Festivals ===
- Falles: held in March.
- Moors and Christians and La Cordà: is the culmination of the festival, which takes place in the morning following to the last Sunday of August. It is a pyrotechnic event that takes place on Main Street. The shooters, led by Mayor Fireworks, burn 50,000 rockets with an intensity of 2,000 rockets per minute. The professional and amateur shooters can shoot rockets in space enabled, the cohetódromo during the development of the major festivals. On the same day of La Cordà, and the previous day, other outstanding pyrotechnic events are held: the Rocket House Parade and Correfoc dels Dimonis of Massalfasar which from 2010 is organized by The Federation of Paterna Interpenyes and the Gatzara Gang, respectively, which take place in the center streets of Paterna. Also, after of La Cordà, in The Central Park, the penyas in the municipality, together with some neighbors, the traditional Recordà is discharged, which continue until 7 am.

=== Gastronomy ===
In addition to the typical cuisine of the area of Valencia: paella, rice and vegetables, stands out the cachap: a sweet pastry filled with a special typical cream of Paterna.

== Twin towns ==
- Adeje, Spain
- Burbank, United States
- Marino, Italy

== Notable people ==
- Antonio Ferrandis (1921–2000), actor
- Roberto Gil (1938-2022): footballer.

== See also ==
- List of municipalities in Valencia
