= List of airline codes (P) =

This is a list of all airline codes. The table lists the IATA airline designators, the ICAO airline designators and the airline call signs (telephony designator). Historical assignments are also included for completeness.

== Codes ==
Airline codes
IATA	ICAO	Airline	Call sign	Country	Comments
PB	PVL	PAL Airlines	PAL Airlines	Canada	
2P	GAP	PAL Express	AIRPHIL	Philippines	Regional subsidiary of Philippine Airlines
	PIP	Pilot Flight Academy	PILOT	Norway	
	HRS	Pursuit Aviation	HORSEMAN	United States	2016
	NCT	Pete Air	PETE AIR	Thailand	2014
	PRT	Prime Service Italia	PRIME ITALIA	Italy	2014
	PXT	Pacific Coast Jet	PACK COAST	United States	Allocated in 2014
	BPH	Phoenix Helicopter Academy	BLACK PHOENIX	United Kingdom	
	PFY	Pel-Air Aviation	PELFLIGHT	Australia	
	PXR	Pixair Survey	PIXAIR	France	
	PNC	Prince Aviation	PRINCE	Serbia	
	PMI	Primero Transportes Aereos	AEROEPRIM	Mexico	
	KTL	P & P Floss Pick Manufacturers	KNOTTSBERRY	South Africa	
	PCR	PAC Air	PACAIR	United States	Pearson Aviation Corporation
PV	PNR	PAN Air	SKYJET	Spain	
9Q	PBA	PB Air	PEEBEE AIR	Thailand	
	PDQ	PDQ Air Charter	DISPATCH	United States	
	XAS	PHH Aviation System		United States	
	PDG	PLM Dollar Group	OSPREY	United Kingdom	
PU	PUA	PLUNA	PLUNA	Uruguay	
U4	PMT	PMTair	MULTITRADE	Cambodia	Progress Multitrade
	PRP	PRT Aviation	PRONTO	Spain	
OH	JIA	PSA Airlines	BLUE STREAK	United States	part of American Airlines Group
	KST	PTL Luftfahrtunternehmen	KING STAR	Germany	
	WIS	Paccair	WISCAIR	United States	
Y5	PCE	Pace Airlines	PACE	United States	Pace Airlines was purchased by Hooters in December 2002.
	PAB	Pacific Air Boats	AIR BOATS	Canada	
	PRC	Pacific Air Charter	PACIFIC CHARTER	United States	
	PAQ	Pacific Air Express	SOLPAC	Solomon Islands	Registered Solomon Islands, main base in Brisbane, Australia
	PXP	Pacific Air Transport	PAK EXPRESS	United States	
BL	PIC	Pacific Airlines	PACIFIC AIRLINES	Vietnam	
	PAK	Pacific Alaska Airlines	PACIFIC ALASKA	United States	
	PCV	Pacific Aviation (Australia)	PACAV	Australia	
	PTO	European Flight Academy / Lufthansa Aviation Training	ROOKIE	Germany	
	PCX	Pacific Aviation (United States)		United States	
DJ	PBN	Pacific Blue	BLUEBIRD	New Zealand	Controlled Dupe IATA with Virgin Australia
	PQA	Pacific Coast Airlines	SAGE BRUSH	United States	
8P	PCO	Pacific Coastal Airlines	PASCO	Canada	
Q8	PEC	Pacific East Asia Cargo Airlines	PAC-EAST CARGO	Philippines	
	PFA	Pacific Flight Services	PACIFIC SING	Singapore	
	PIN	Pacific International Airlines	ROAD RUNNERS	United States	
	PSA	Pacific Island Aviation	PACIFIC ISLE	United States	
	PCJ	Pacific Jet	PACIFIC JET	United States	
	PPM	Pacific Pearl Airways	PACIFIC PEARL	Philippines	
	PAR	Pacific Rim Airways	PACRIM	Australia	
LW	NMI	Pacific Wings	TSUNAMI	United States	
GX		Pacificair		Philippines	
	PFR	Pacificair Airlines	PACIFIC WEST	United States	
	RCY	Package Express	RACE CITY	United States	
	PAE	Paisajes Españoles	PAISAJES	Spain	
	PKW	Pak West Airlines	PLATINUM WEST	United States	
PK	PIA	Pakistan International Airlines	PAKISTAN	Pakistan	
	PKR	Pakker Avio	PAKKER AVIO	Estonia	
	LPA	Pal Aerolíneas	LINEASPAL	Mexico	
	PPC	Palau Asia Pacific Airlines	PALAU ASIAPAC	Palau	
	PNA	Palau National Airlines	SEBUS	Palau	2014
GP	PTP	Palau Trans Pacific Airlines	TRANS PACIFIC	Palau	
PF	PNW	Palestinian Airlines	PALESTINIAN	Egypt	
	JSP	Palmer Aviation	PALMER	United Kingdom	
NR	PIR	Pamir Airways	PAMIR	Afghanistan	
	PFN	Pan African Air Services	PANAFRICAN	Sierra Leone	
	ODM	Pan African Airways		Kenya	
	PAX	Pan Air	PANNEX	United States	
	XPA	Pan Am Weather Systems		United States	
7N	PWD	PAWA Dominicana		Dominican Republic	
PN		Pan American Airways		United States	defunct
PA	PAA	Pan American Airways		United States	defunct
PA	PAA	Pan American World Airways	CLIPPER	United States	defunct 1991
	PEA	Pan Europeenne Air Service		France	
	PHT	Pan Havacilik Ve Ticaret	PANANK	Turkey	
	PMA	Pan Malaysian Air Transport	PAN MALAYSIA	Malaysia	
	PNC	Pan-Air	PANAIRSA	Mexico	
	PNF	Panafrican Airways	PANWAYS	Ivory Coast	defunct
	PGI	Panagra Airways	PANAGRA	United States	
	RSL	Panama Aircraft Rental and Sales	PANAMA RENTAL	Panama	2014
	PEI	Panamedia	PANAMEDIA	Spain	
	PVI	Panavia		Panama	
	PNH	Panh	KUBAN LIK	Russia	
	PHU	Pannon Air Service	PANNON	Hungary	
	PNM	Panorama	PANORAMA	Spain	
	PAH	Panorama Air Tour	LANI	United States	
	AFD	Panorama Flight Service	AIRFED	United States	
P8	PTN	Pantanal Linhas Aéreas	PANTANAL	Brazil	
	HMP	Papair Terminal	PAPAIR TERMINAL	Haiti	
	PAI	Paradise Airways	SEA RAY	United States	
	PDI	Paradise Island Airways	PARADISE ISLAND	United States	
	PGX	Paragon Air Express	PARAGON EXPRESS	United States	
	PGF	Paragon Global Flight Support		United Kingdom	
	PRR	Paramount Airlines	PARAMOUNT	Sierra Leone	
I7	PMW	Paramount Airways	PARAWAY	India	
WE	PTA	Parata Air	PARATA AIR	Republic of Korea	
	APE	Parcel Express	AIR PARCEL	United States	
	IRE	Pariz Air	PARIZAIR	Iran	
	PRA	Pars Aviation Service	PARSAVIA	Iran	
	PST	Parsa	TURISMO REGIONAL	Panama	
	FAP	Parsons Airways Northern		Canada	
P6	PSC	Pascan Aviation	PASCAN	Canada	
P3	PTB	Passaredo Transportes Aéreos	PASSAREDO	Brazil	
	PTC	Patria Cargas Aéreas	PATRIA	Argentina	
	BYT	Patriot Aviation Limited	BYTE	United Kingdom	
	ETL	Patterson Aviation Company	ENTEL	United States	
	PHE	Pawan Hans	PAWAN HANS	India	
	IRP	Payam Air	PAYAMAIR	Iran	Air Center Service
	KGC	Peach Air	GOLDCREST	United Kingdom	
	PRL	Pearl Air	PEARL LINE	Pakistan	
	PBY	Pearl Air Services	PEARL SERVICES	Uganda	
HP	HPA	Pearl Airways	PEARL AIRWAYS	Haiti	IATA code withdrawn
	PVU	Peau Vavaʻu	PEAU	Tonga	
	PXA	Pecotox Air	PECOTOX	Moldova	
PC	PGT	Pegasus Airlines	SUNTURK	Turkey	WAS 1I, H9
PE	PEV	People's	PEOPLES	Austria	Previously used by Pegaviation, and PeopleExpress (US low cost carrier 1981-87)
1I		Pegasus Hava Tasimaciligi	Sunturk	Turkey	
	HAK	Pegasus Helicopters	HELIFALCON	Norway	
	PDF	Pelican Air Services	PELICAN AIRWAYS	South Africa	
	PEX	Pelican Express	PELICAN EXPRESS	United States	
	PAS	Pelita Air Service	PELITA	Indonesia	
	PEM	Pem-Air	PEM-AIR	Canada	
	PDY	Pen-Avia	PENDLEY	United Kingdom	
KS	PEN	Peninsula Airways	PENINSULA	United States	
	PNE	Peninter Aérea	PENINTER	Mexico	
	PCA	Penya De L'Aire	PENA DEL AIRE	Spain	
	CVT	Peran	CVETA	Kazakhstan	
	PCC	Perforadora Central	PERFORADORA CENTRAL	Mexico	
	PAG	Perimeter Aviation	PERIMETER	Canada	
P9	PGP	Perm Airlines	PERM AIR	Russia	
	PPQ	Personas Y Pasquetes Por Air	PERSONSPAQ	Mexico	
P9	PVN	Peruvian Airlines		Peru	
	FPR	Peruvian Air Force		Peru	Fuerza Aérea Del Perú
	INP	Peruvian Navy		Peru	
	PEO	Petro Air	PETRO AIR	Libya	
	PMX	Petroleos Mexicanos	PEMEX	Mexico	
	PHM	Petroleum Helicopters	PETROLEUM	United States	
	PHC	Petroleum Helicopters de Colombia	HELICOPTERS	Colombia	
	PTK	Petropavlovsk-Kamchatsk Air Enterprise	PETROKAM	Russia	
	PTY	Petty Transport	PETTY	United States	
	PHV	Phenix Aviation	NEW BIRD	France	
	PMY	Phetchabun Airline	PHETCHABUN AIR	Thailand	
Z2	APG	Philippines AirAsia	COOL RED	Philippines	
PR	PAL	Philippine Airlines	PHILIPPINE	Philippines	
	PHI	Philips Aviation Services	PHILAIR	Netherlands	ICAO code and call sign no longer allocated
	BCH	Phillips Air	BEACHBALL	United States	
	PDD	Phillips Alaska	PADA	United States	
	PHL	Phillips Michigan City Flying Service	PHILLIPS	United States	
	PHB	Phoebus Apollo Aviation	PHOEBUS	South Africa	
	KZM	Phoebus Apolloa Zambia	CARZAM	Zambia	
	PHA	Phoenix Air Group	GRAY BIRD	United States	
	PHN	Phoenix Air Lines	PHOENIX BRASIL	Brazil	
	PAM	Phoenix Air	PHOENIX	Germany	
	PPG	Phoenix Air Transport	PAPAGO	United States	
	WDY	Phoenix Airline Services	WINDYCITY	United States	
HP		Phoenix Airways		Switzerland	
	PHY	Phoenix Avia	PHOENIX ARMENIA	Armenia	
	PHG	Phoenix Aviation	PHOENIX GROUP	Kyrgyzstan	
	XPX	Phoenix Flight Operations		United States	
9R	VAP	Phuket Air	PHUKET AIR	Thailand	
PI	PAI	Piedmont Airlines (1948-1989)	PIEDMONT	United States	defunct
PT	PDT	Piedmont Airlines	PIEDMONT	United States	part of American Airlines Group
	PCH	Pilatus Flugzeugwerke	PILATUS WINGS	Switzerland	
	PLU	Pilatus PC-12 Center De Mexico	PILATUS MEXICO	Mexico	
	MKS	Pimichikamac Air	MIKISEW	Canada	
	PNP	Pineapple Air	PINEAPPLE AIR	Bahamas	
	PIM	Pinframat	PINFRAMAT	Angola	
	PCL	Pinnacle Air Group	PINNACLE GROUP	United States	
9E	FLG	Pinnacle Airlines	FLAGSHIP	United States	
	PIO	Pioneer Airlines	PIONEER	United States	
	PER	Pioneers Limited		Pakistan	
	PRN	Pirinair Express	PRINAIR EXPRESS	Spain	
	PLN	Planar	PLANAR	Angola	
	PMS	Planemaster Services	PLANEMASTER	United States	
	PLZ	Planet Airways	PLANET	United States	
OG	FPY	Play	PLAYER	Iceland	
	PYZ	Players Air	PLAYERS AIR	United States	
	LIB	Polizeihubschrauberstaffel Hamburg	LIBELLE	Germany	
	PSF	Plymouth School of Flying	LIZARD	United Kingdom	
DP	PBD	Pobeda	POBEDA	Russia	
	POC	Pocono Air Lines	POCONO	United States	
	PDA	Podilia-Avia	PODILIA	Ukraine	
	PAZ	Point Afrique Niger	POINTAIR NIGER	Niger	
	RMI	Point Airlines	POINT AIRLINE	Nigeria	
	PAW	Pointair Burkina	POINTAIR BURKINA	Burkina Faso	
	PTS	Points of Call Airlines	POINTSCALL	Canada	
PO	PAC	Polar Air Cargo	POLAR	United States	
	PMO	Polar Airlines de Mexico	POLAR MEXICO	Mexico	
	PSR	Polestar Aviation	POLESTAR	United Kingdom	
	POT	Polet Flight	POLET	Russia	
	POF	Police Aux Frontières	AIRPOL	France	
	PLC	Police Aviation Services	SPECIAL	United Kingdom	
	PLF	Polish Air Force	POLISH AIRFORCE	Poland	
	PNY	Polish Navy	POLISH NAVY	Poland	
	NRW	Polizeifliegerstaffel Nordrhein-Westfalen	HUMMEL	Germany	
	PPH	Polizeihubschrauberstaffel Niedersachsen	POLICE PHOENIX	Germany	
	PIK	Polizeihubschrauberstaffel Sachsen-Anhalt	POLICE IKARUS	Germany	
	SRP	Polizeihubschauberstaffel Rheinland-Pfalz	SPERBER	Germany	
	PBW	Polizeihubschrauberstaffel Baden-Württemberg	BUSSARD	Germany	
	EDL	Polizeihubschrauberstaffel Bayern	POLICE EDELWEISS	Germany	
	PBB	Polizeihubschrauberstaffel Brandenburg	ADEBAR	Germany	
	PHH	Polizeihubschrauberstaffel Hessen	IBIS	Germany	
	PMV	Polizeihubschrauberstaffel Mecklenburg-Vorpommern	POLICE MERLIN	Germany	
	PHS	Polizeihubschrauberstaffel Sachsen	PASSAT	Germany	
	HBT	Polizeihubschrauberstaffel Thüringen	HABICHT	Germany	
	CUK	Polo Aviation	CHUKKA	United Kingdom	
	PLA	Polynesian Air-Ways	POLYAIR	United States	
PH	PAO	Polynesian Airlines	POLYNESIAN	Samoa	
DJ	PLB	Polynesian Blue	POLYBLUE	New Zealand	Controlled Dupe IATA, Code reserved but not in use, PBN (Bluebird) used.
1U		Polyot Sirena		Russia	
	PND	Pond Air Express	POND AIR	United States	
	PSI	Pont International Airline Services	PONT	Suriname	defunct
	PLX	Pool Aviation	POOLEX	United Kingdom	
	PTQ	Port Townsend Airways	TOWNSEND	United States	
	POR	Porteadora De Cosola	PORTEADORA	Mexico	
P3	PTR	Porter Airlines	PORTER	Canada	
NI	PGA	Portugalia	PORTUGALIA	Portugal	
	AFP	Portuguese Air Force	PORTUGUESE AIR FORCE	Portugal	
	POA	Portuguese Army	PORTUGUESE ARMY	Portugal	
	PON	Portuguese Navy	PORTUGUESE NAVY	Portugal	
M4	MSA	Poste Air Cargo	AIRMERCI	Italy	
BK	PDC	Potomac Air	DISTRICT	United States	
	PSN	Potosina Del Aire	POTOSINA	Mexico	
	PWL	Powell Air	POWELL AIR	Canada	
	PFS	Prairie Flying Service	PRAIRIE	United States	
	PWC	Pratt and Whitney Canada	PRATT	Canada	
PW	PRF	Precision Air	PRECISION AIR	Tanzania	
	PRE	Precision Airlines	PRECISION	United States	
	BAT	Premiair	BALLISTIC	Luxembourg	
	PGL	Premiair Aviation Services	PREMIERE	United Kingdom	
	PME	Premiair Flying Club	ADUR	United Kingdom	
	EMI	Premium Air Shuttle	BLUE SHUTTLE	Nigeria	
	PMU	Premium Aviation	PREMIUM	Germany	
	BFA	Presidence Du Faso		Burkina Faso	
	ONM	Presidencia de La Republica de Guinea Ecuatorial		Equatorial Guinea	
TO	PSD	President Airlines		Cambodia	
MO	AUH	Presidential Flight	SULTAN	United Arab Emirates	Presidential flight
	PRD	Presidential Aviation	PRESIDENTIAL	United States	
	PWA	Priester Aviation	PRIESTER	United States	
	PMM	Paradigm Air Operators	PARADIGM	United States	
FE	WCP	Primaris Airlines	WHITECAP	United States	
	PMC	Primas Courier	PRIMAC	United States	
	CRY	Primavia Limited	CARRIERS	United Kingdom	
	PRM	Prime Airlines	PRIME AIR	United States	
	PKZ	Prime Aviation	PRAVI	Kazakhstan	
	CME	Prince Edward Air	COMET	Canada	
	PJP	Princely Jets	PRINCELY JETS	Pakistan	
8Q		Princess Air			no longer assigned
	PCN	Princeton Aviation Corporation	PRINCETON	United States	
	PRY	Priority Air Charter	PRIORITY AIR	United States	
	PAT	Priority Air Transport	PAT	United States	Department of the Army
	BCK	Priority Aviation Company	BANKCHECK	United States	
	PTI	Privatair	PRIVATAIR	Switzerland	
	PJE	Private Jet Expeditions	PEE JAY	United States	
	PJA	Private Jet Management	PRIVATE FLIGHT	United States	
8W	PWF	Private Wings Flugcharter	PRIVATE WINGS	Germany	
P6	PVG	Privilege Style	PRIVILEGE	Spain	
	PRH	Pro Air	PROHAWK	United States	
	PSZ	Pro Air Service	POP-AIR	United States	
	GIY	Probiz Guinee	PROBIZ	Guinea	
	PAD	Professional Express Courier Service	AIR PROFESSIONAL	United States	
	PVL	Professione VOlare	VOLARE	Italy	
P0	PFZ	Proflight Zambia	PROFLIGHT-ZAMBIA	Zambia	
	PTT	Promotora Industria Totolapa	TOTOLAPA	Mexico	
	PRO	Propair	PROPAIR	Canada	
	PPA	Propheter Aviation	AIR PROP	United States	
	PTH	Proteus Helicopteres	PROTEUS	France	
	PTL	Providence Airline	PLANTATION	United States	
	AWD	Providence Aviation Services		Pakistan	
PB	SPR	Provincial Airlines	SPEEDAIR	Canada	
	PRV	Provincial Express	PROVINCIAL	Canada	
	PSW	Pskovavia	PSKOVAVIA	Russia	
	UDA	Psudiklat Perhubungan Udara/PLP	UDARA	Indonesia	
	PTA	Ptarmigan Airways	PTARMIGAN	Canada	
	PSP	Publiservicios Aéreos	PUBLISERVICIOS	Mexico	
	PUV	Publivoo	PUBLIVOO	Portugal	Publicidade e Imagens Aéreas
	PNG	Puerto Rico National Guard		United States	
	TXV	Puerto Vallarta Taxi Aéreo	TAXIVALLARTA	Mexico	
	PGH	Pulkovo Aircraft Services		Russia	
	PLY	Puma Linhas Aéreas	PUMA BRASIL	Brazil	
	PTV	Puntavia Air Services	PUNTAVIA	Djibouti	
	MGO	Punto Fa	MANGO	Spain	
	PYR	Pyramid Air Lines	PYAIR	Egypt	
FV	PLK	Pulkovo Aviation Enterprise	PULKOVO	Russia	defunct merged into Rossiya
	PRI	Primera Air Scandinavia	PRIMERA	Denmark	
	PRW	Primera Air Nordic	JETBIRD	Latvia	

== IATA Traffic Conference Areas ==
The International Air Transport Association (IATA) divides the world into three areas called the Traffic Conference Areas (TCAs) for air travel purposes. These areas are used to define geographical boundaries for fare construction and other industry-related practices:

- Traffic Conference Area 1 (TC1) – this area includes the Americas, encompassing North America (the Caribbean, Central America, and Northern America) and South America.
- Traffic Conference Area 2 (TC2) – this area includes the EMEA region, encompassing Europe, the Middle East, and Africa (North Africa and Sub-Saharan Africa).
- Traffic Conference Area 3 (TC3) – this area includes the Asia–Pacific region, encompassing the rest of Asia (Central Asia, East Asia, North Asia, South Asia, and Southeast Asia) and Oceania.

Essentially, TC1 covers the "New World", while TC2 and TC3 together cover the "Old World" (Africa-Eurasia) and the "Land Down Under".

== See also ==
- IATA airport code
- ICAO airport code
