= Antezana/Andetxa =

Hamlet in Álava, Spain

- Concejo
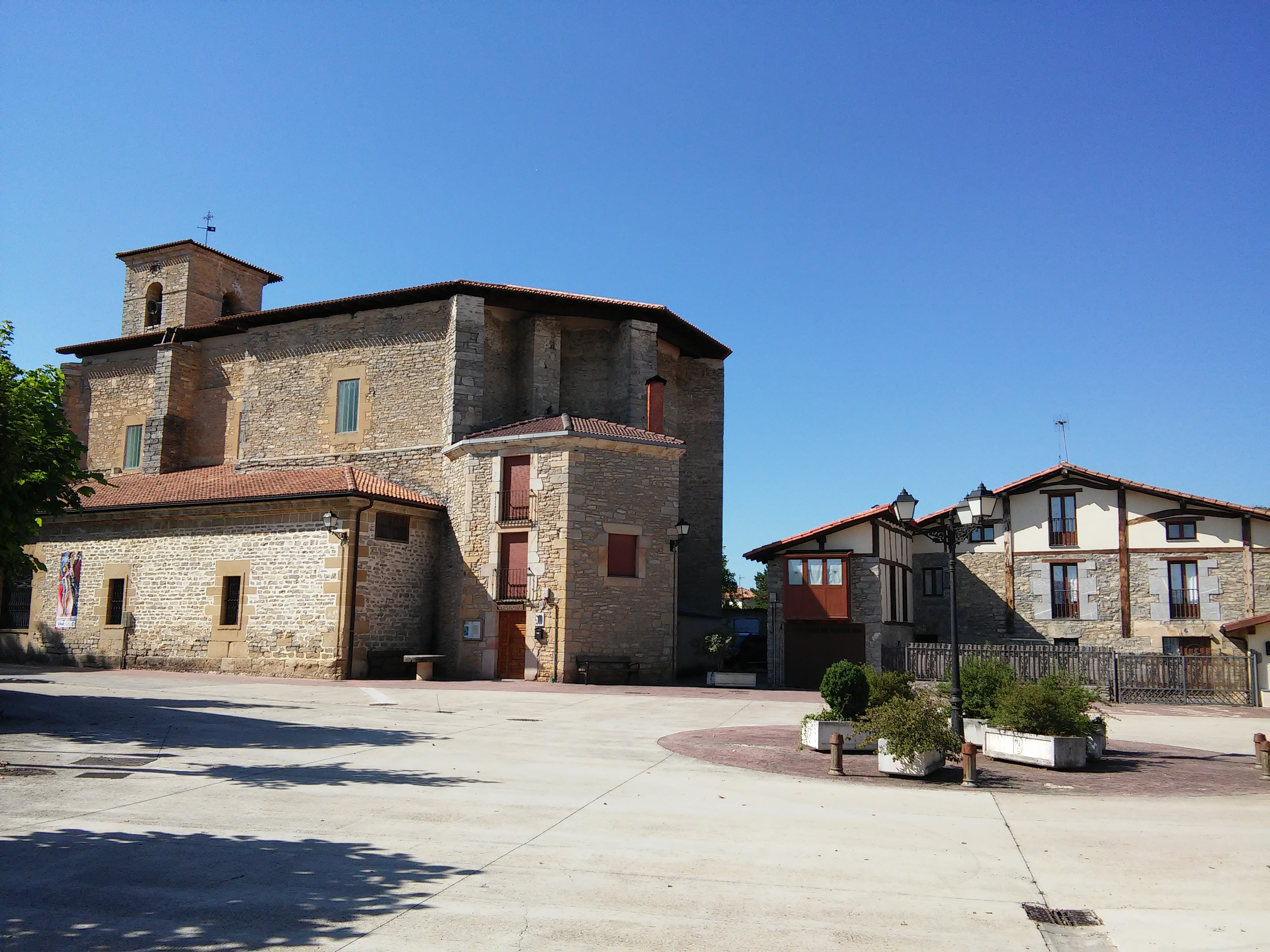
- Parish church

- Coat of arms

- Location within Álava Location within the Basque Country Location within Spain
- Coordinates: 42°53′17″N 2°43′33″W
- Country: Spain
- Autonomous community: Basque Country
- Province: Álava
- Comarca: Vitoria-Gasteiz
- Municipality: Vitoria-Gasteiz
- Elevation: 509 m (1,670 ft)

Population (2021)
  - Total: 84
- Postal code: 01195

Antezana (Spanish pronunciation: [anteˈθana]) (Note: Also known unofficially as Antezana de Foronda and in the past as Antezana de Álava.) or Andetxa (Basque pronunciation: [andetʃa]) is a hamlet and concejo located in the municipality of Vitoria-Gasteiz, in Álava province, Basque Country, Spain. It is located next to the terminal of Vitoria Airport, so it has good access via expressways.

== Toponymy ==
The local council adopted a resolution on January 30, 2011, in which the name was changed from Antezana de Foronda to Antezana/Andetxa.

== History ==
Antezana belonged to the municipality of Foronda, of which it was the capital, until it was absorbed by the Vitoria municipality in the 1970s. Vitoria Airport was built near the hamlet, which is the closest to the airport terminal.

== Demographics ==
The population has declined significantly in recent decades. In 1960 it had 113 inhabitants and this has decreased over the years to 84 inhabitants in 2021.

== Culture ==
The main building of the village is the church of San Miguel, dating from the eighteenth and nineteenth centuries. From 2014 to 2018, the interior of the church was painted with modern style murals.

Local festivities take place on 29 September.
