= Guereña =

Hamlet in Álava

Gereña
- Concejo
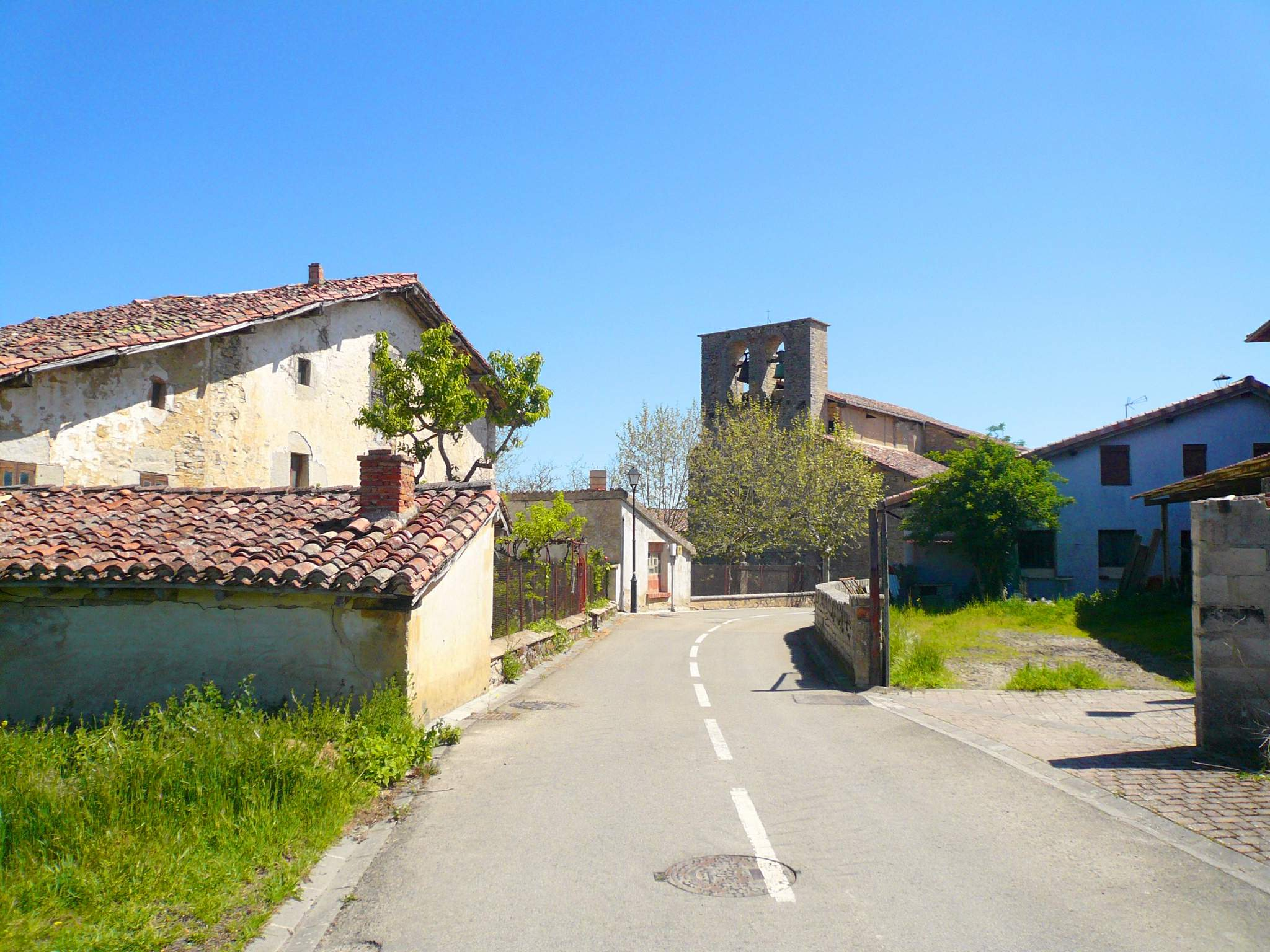

- Location within Álava Location within the Basque Country Location within Spain
- Coordinates: 42°53′08″N 2°44′22″W
- Country: Spain
- Autonomous community: Basque Country
- Province: Álava
- Comarca: Vitoria-Gasteiz
- Municipality: Vitoria-Gasteiz

Area
  - Total: 1.91 km^{2} (0.74 sq mi)
- Elevation: 509 m (1,670 ft)

Population (2022)
  - Total: 54
  - Density: 28/km^{2} (73/sq mi)
- Postal code: 01191

Gereña (Spanish: Guereña) is a hamlet and concejo in the municipality of Vitoria-Gasteiz, in Álava province, Basque Country, Spain. It is located close to Vitoria Airport, across the Zalla river.
