= Málaga Airport =

International airport serving Costa del Sol, Málaga, Spain

Málaga–Costa del Sol Airport Aeropuerto de Málaga-Costa del Sol

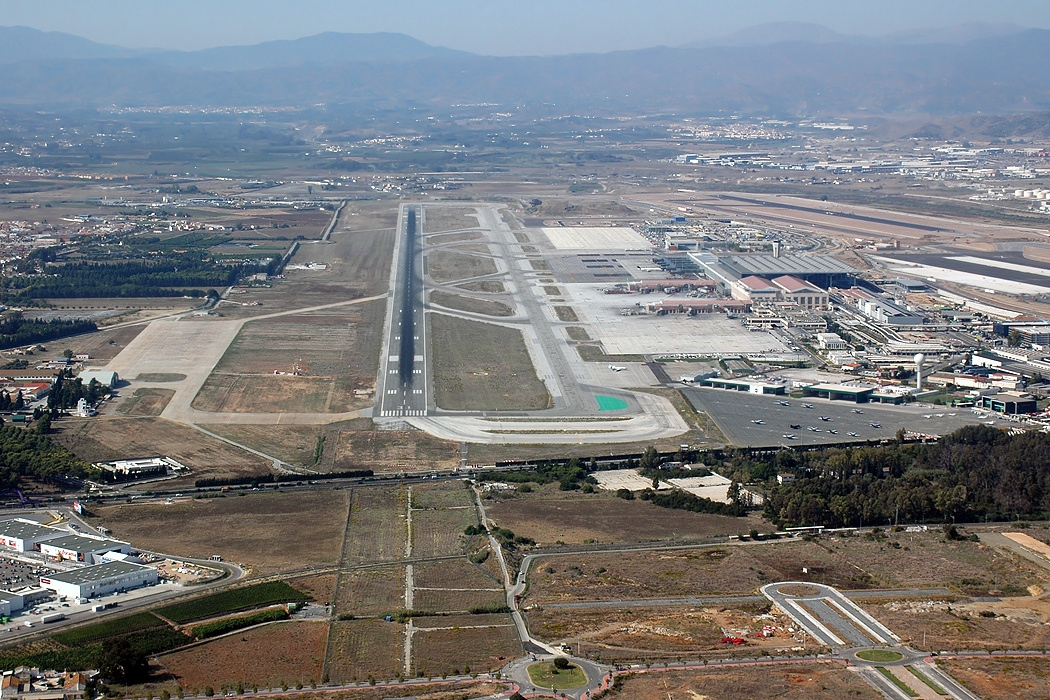
- IATA: AGP; ICAO: LEMG

Summary
- Airport type: Public
- Owner/Operator: AENA
- Serves: Málaga and the Costa del Sol
- Location: Churriana, Málaga, Andalusia, Spain
- Operating base for: easyJet; Norwegian Air Shuttle; Ryanair; Vueling
- Elevation AMSL: 16 m (52 ft)
- Coordinates: 36°40′30″N 004°29′57″W
- Website: www.aena.es/en/malaga-airport/index.html

Map
- Location within Spain

Runways
Direction	Length		Surface
Direction	m	ft	Surface
13/31	3,200	10,500	Asphalt
12/30	2,750	9,022	Asphalt

Statistics (2023, provisional)
- Passengers: 22,444,373
- Passenger change 2022-2023: ▲21.1%
- Aircraft movements: 161,684
- Movements change 2022-2023: ▲12.2%
- Cargo (t): 2,806
- Sources: Passenger Traffic, AENA; Spanish AIP, AENA

Málaga–Costa del Sol Airport (IATA: AGP, ICAO: LEMG) is the fourth busiest airport in Spain after Madrid–Barajas, Barcelona–El Prat and Palma de Mallorca. It is significant for Spanish tourism as the main international airport serving the Costa del Sol. It is 8 km (5.0 mi) southwest of Málaga and 5 km (3.1 mi) north of Torremolinos. The airport has flight connections to over 40 countries worldwide, and over 14.4 million passengers passed through it in 2015. In 2023, 22.4 million passengers passed through Málaga Airport. The airport operates with three terminals and two runways.

Málaga Airport is the busiest international airport of Andalusia, accounting for 70 per cent of the autonomous community's non-domestic traffic. It offers a wide variety of international destinations. The airport, connected to the Costa del Sol, has a daily link with twenty cities in Spain and over one hundred cities in Europe. Direct flights also operate to Africa, the Middle East, and to North America. Airlines with a base at the airport are Air Europa, Norwegian, Scandinavian Airlines, Ryanair, Vueling and EasyJet which operates a seasonal base.

== History ==
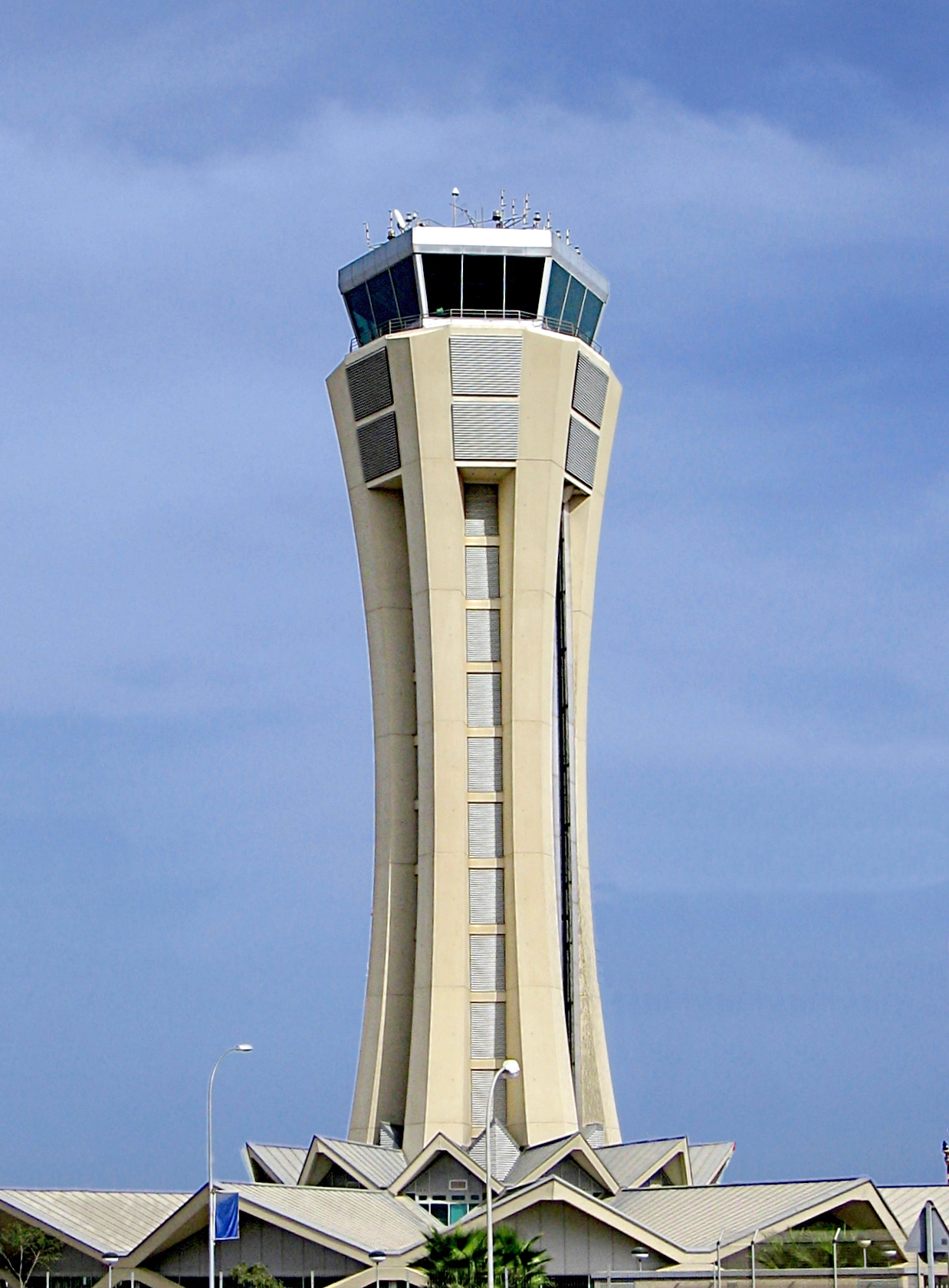
Control tower at Málaga Airport, built in 2002

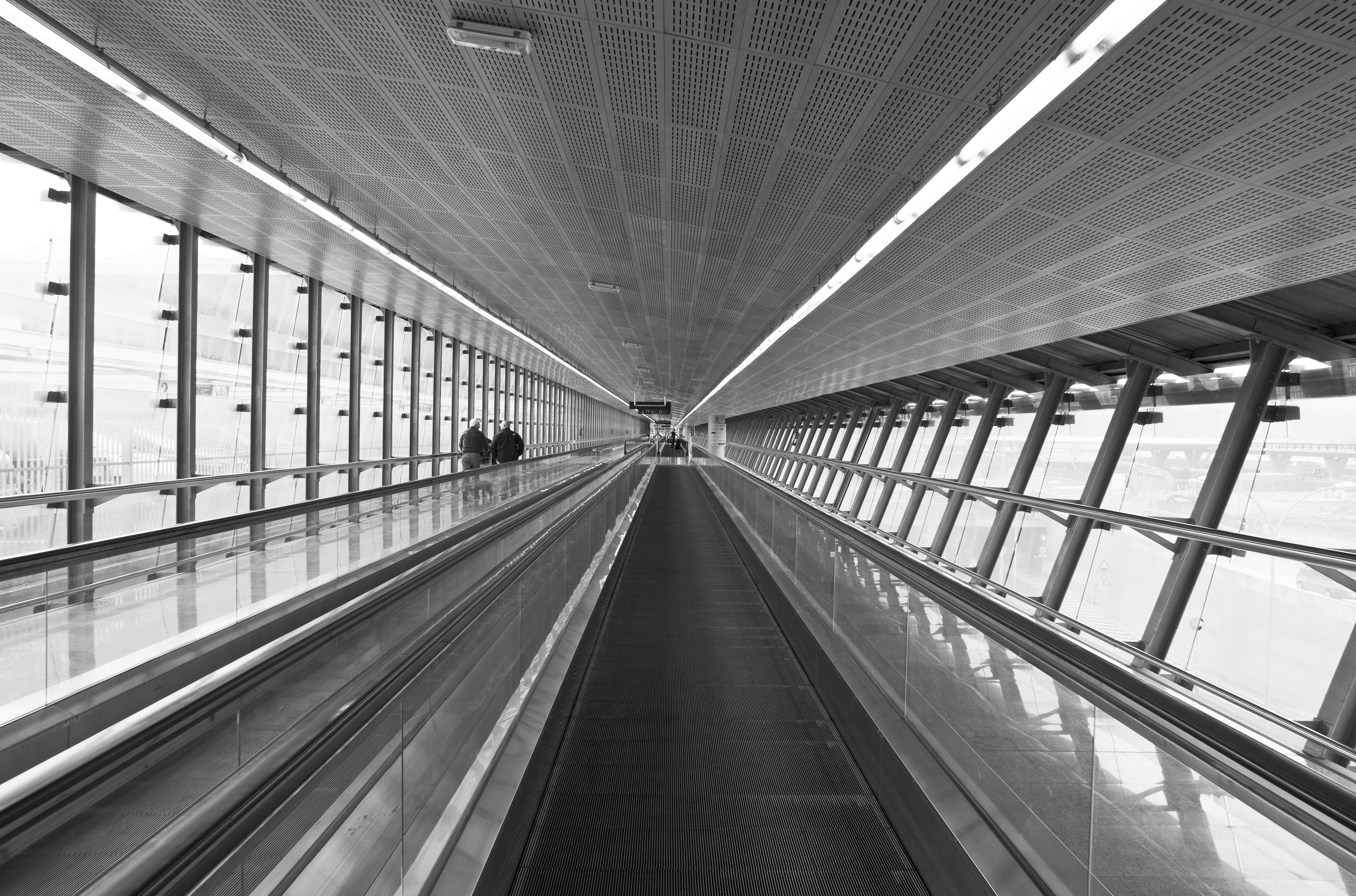
Málaga Airport

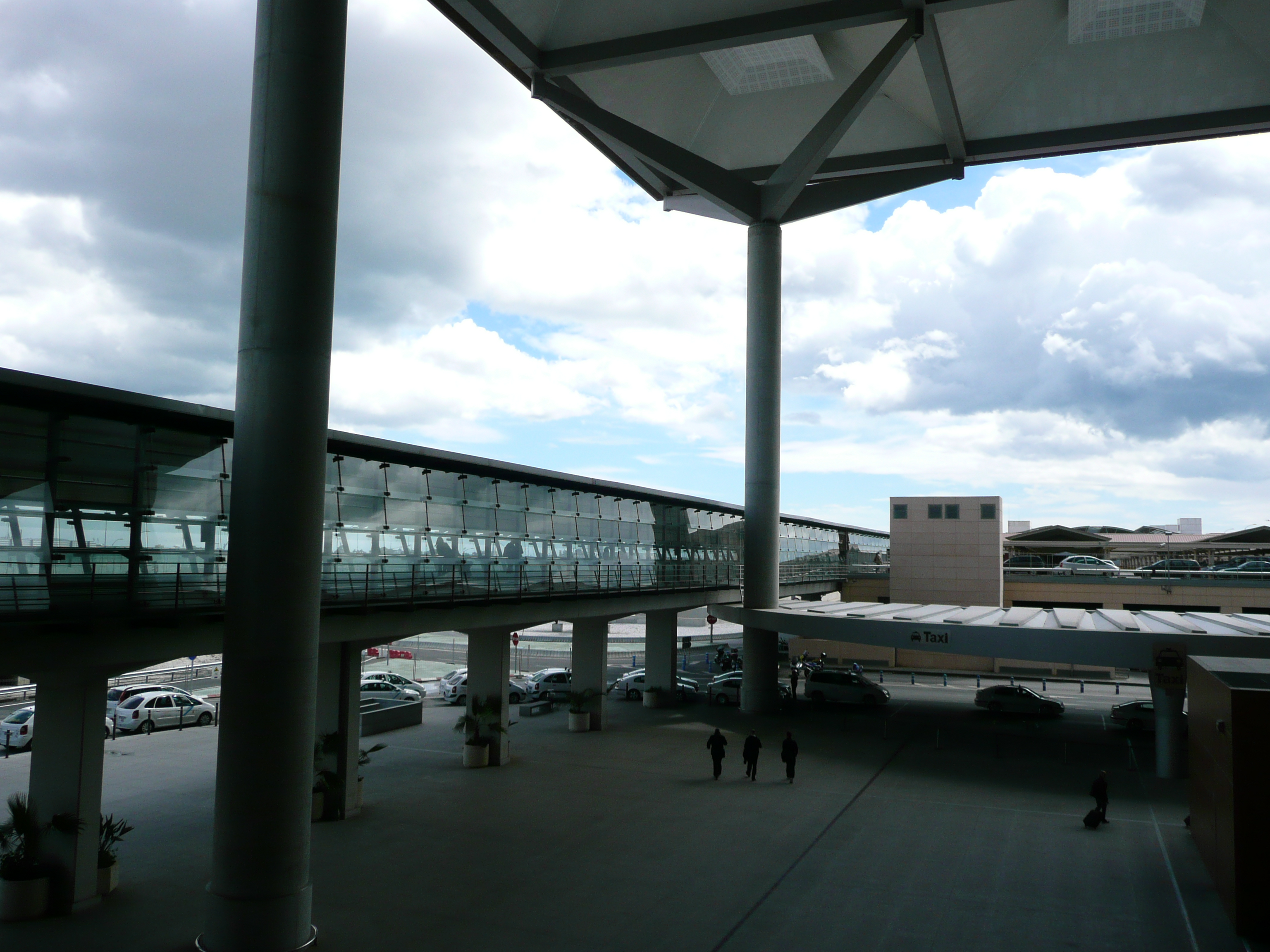
Another view of the airport

=== Foundation and early years ===
Málaga Airport is one of the oldest Spanish airports that has stayed in its original location. After test flights, the first scheduled air service from Málaga began on 1 September 1919 when Didier Daurat began regular flights between Toulouse, Barcelona, Alicante, Tangier and Casablanca.

The single runway was extended in the 1960s, and a new terminal was erected in the centre of the site.

The airport was given its current title in 1965. In 1968, a new passenger terminal was opened. In 1972, a second passenger terminal was opened to cater specifically for non-scheduled traffic. An increase in companies offering package holidays (around 30 by 1965) meant that this type of traffic was providing an increasing proportion of the airport's business. The terminal was very similar to the ones that were built in Palma de Mallorca, Alicante, Ibiza and Girona.

On 30 November 1991, a new passenger terminal opened at the airport which is today's Terminal 2. It was designed by Ricardo Bofill Taller de Arquitectura. Almost all services moved their operations to this terminal when it opened.

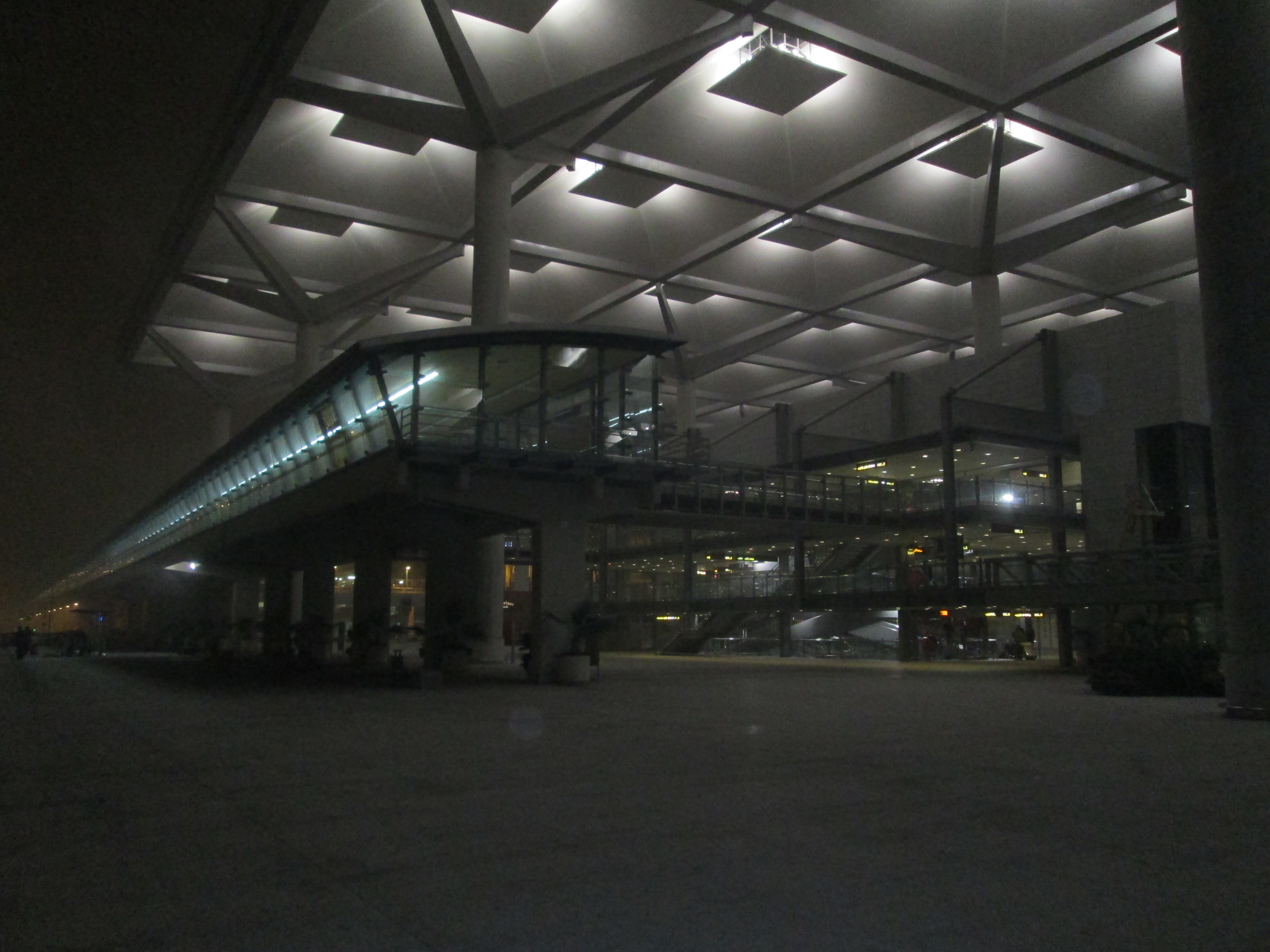
Terminal 3

In 1995, the old passenger building was converted into a general aviation terminal, and a new hangar for large aircraft maintenance was built to the north of the airport site. Also constructed was a terminal specifically catering for cargo traffic a year later, along with a hangar for maintenance of big aircraft. In 1997, an enlargement of the parking of gates was built and fuel systems were added at all the gates.

The airport's domestic departures section once had the head office of Binter Mediterraneo.

In November 2002, a new control tower was built with a height of 54 m (177 ft).

In 2004, the "Málaga Plan" was started, including ideas for construction of a new terminal, and a new runway.

In November 2005, Monarch Airlines opened a base at Málaga. It based an Airbus A320-200 there, and operated scheduled services were added to Aberdeen, Blackpool and Newquay. However, due to their routes being unpopular, the base was closed in 2007. In March 2007, Clickair opened a base at Málaga after announcing a new route to Barcelona. The base has remained since the airline merged with Vueling.

On 26 February 2009, Ándalus Líneas Aéreas started operations from Málaga, but then ceased operations in August 2010. This was the only airline that had their main base at Málaga, until Helitt Líneas Aéreas opened their base in late 2011. On 16 December 2009, low-cost carrier Ryanair announced a base at this airport. This would be their 38th base with an additional 19 routes, bringing Ryanair's total routes from Málaga to 39. The base opened on 23 June 2010. An extra route to Barcelona was announced after the planned opening of their Barcelona base.

=== Development since 2010 ===
On 15 March 2010, the new Terminal 3 was completed. It was opened by King Juan Carlos of Spain, opening to public use the following day. On 10 September 2010, the suburban railway station at Málaga Airport was opened, providing access to catch a train to Málaga from Terminal 3.

In November 2011, Helitt Líneas Aéreas opened their base at Málaga, operating flights to Melilla Airport as well as opening additional routes. The company ceased operations in November 2014.

On 17 May 2012, the first commercial landings on the second runway took place for the first time. The first aircraft to use it was a PA-28 private 4 seated single engine light aircraft and the first commercial flight was Transavia Flight HV6115 from Amsterdam, operated by a Boeing 737-800. A total of 44 aircraft landed on the new runway. The runway was placed into service after the airport obtained the safety clearance of Civil Aviation on 30 April 2012. The runway officially opened on 26 June 2012 and it was inaugurated by the Spanish Minister of Transport, Ana Pastor. It is located on the other side of the terminals where the current runway is. It is in the direction of 12/30 and it has three rapid exits.

In June 2017, Scandinavian Airlines Ireland announced they were to open a base at Málaga. The base opened in June 2018 and operated until April 2020. On 14 March 2018, Primera Air announced they were also to open a base at the airport with one based aircraft and six new routes. The base was to open on 27 October 2018, however this did not happen as the company ceased operations on 1 October 2018.

On 8 October 2020, it was announced that EasyJet would open a seasonal base at Málaga. The based flights are operated by subsidiary EasyJet Europe.

== Terminals ==
Málaga Airport has three adjacent terminals, although only two are in use. It also has a General Aviation Terminal and a Cargo Terminal. Passengers can interchange between Terminal 2 and Terminal 3 both landside and airside. The Airport consists of three piers or docks used by airlines: Pier B (with 13 gates, seven with airbridges) and Pier C (with 10 gates, seven with airbridges) in Terminal 2, and Pier D (with 20 gates, 12 with airbridges) in Terminal 3. Pier B is used for non-Schengen traffic, Pier C is used for non-Schengen Traffic but can be used for Schengen traffic and Pier D is used by Schengen Traffic. EasyJet flights check in at Terminal 2 whilst all others use Terminal 3. The terminals have a total of 164 check-in desks, and have a total of 48 boarding gates of which 26 have airbridges.

=== Terminal 1 ===
Terminal 1 (styled as T1) opened on 30 June 1972 and was used for flights to non-Schengen destinations, along with flights to Ceuta and Mellila. On 16 March 2010, flights to non-Schengen destinations moved to Pier C in Terminal 3 and flights to Ceuta and Mellila moved to Pier D, leaving Terminal 1 operating no flights, although Jet2.com continued to checked in flights there for a short while afterward. The terminal has since closed to the public, and will be demolished sometime between 2028 and 2031 as part of the Málaga Airport DORA III project.

=== Terminal 2 ===
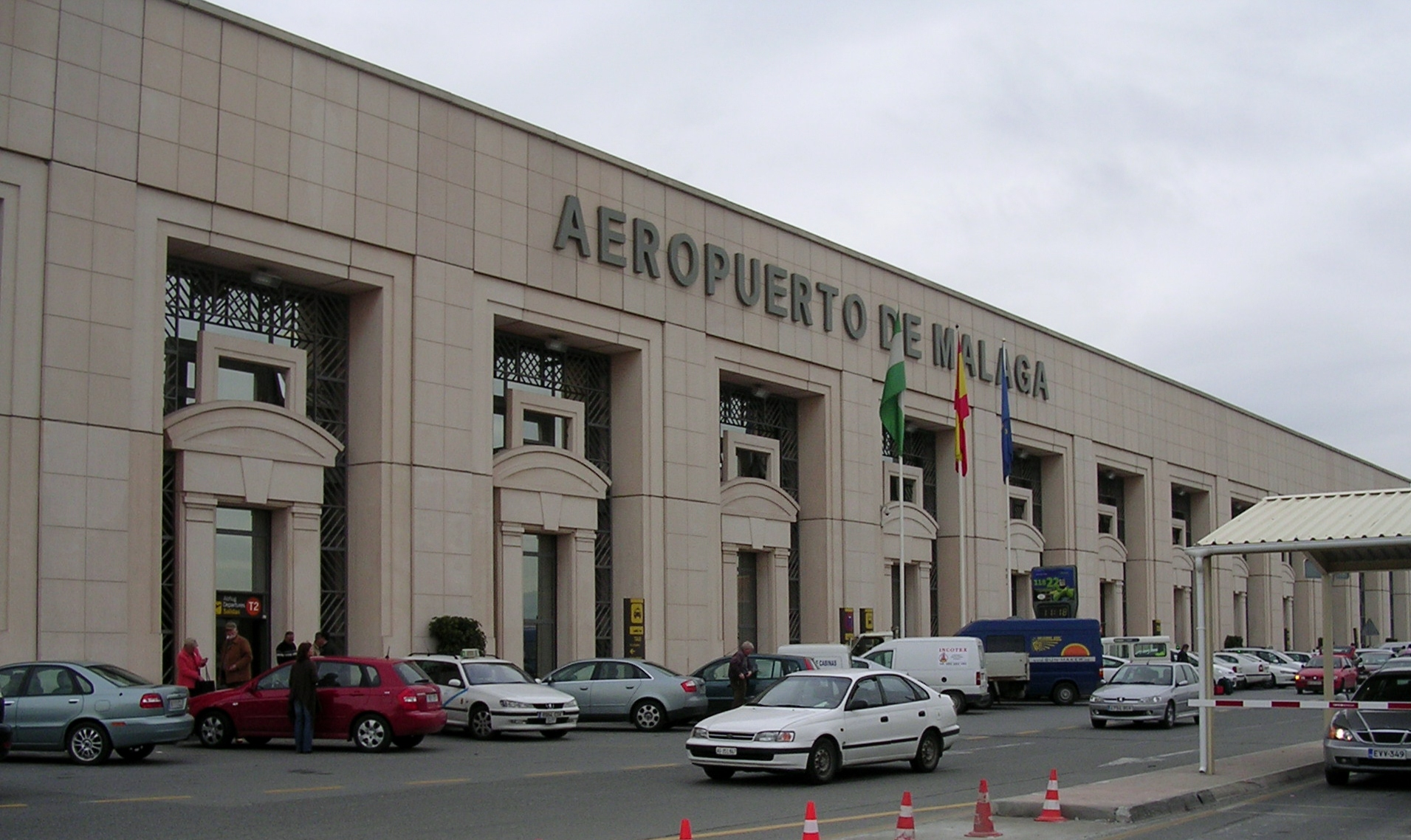
Terminal 2

Terminal 2 (styled as T2) was opened on 30 November 1991, known as the Pablo Ruiz Picasso terminal. The building was designed by architect Ricardo Bofill, and was built to be operated in combination with the pre-existing passenger terminal. It has three floors and a basement, the second floor is for departures and the ground floor is for arrivals. The first floor is used for access to the ground floor of Pier B, and for walkways leading to arrivals. The basement is for the rental-car pickup desks. To complete the terminal, a building was built for car parking and rental cars, which were built right next to the entrance of the departures and arrivals lounges.

Development work was completed on the terminal whilst Terminal 3 was being constructed. In 2008, the original structure connecting Pier C to the main building was demolished and replaced with a temporary structure to allow building work for Terminal 3 to be completed in its place. The temporary structure was removed once Terminal 3 opened and Pier C is now accessed from Terminal 3. All gate numbers were changed in 2010 prior to Terminal 3's opening, with only one gate, B16, keeping the original gate number. When Terminal 3 opened, the old arrivals waiting area was converted to a passengers' transfer between terminals.

Terminal 2 has been refurbished since Terminal 3 has opened costing around €2.5 million. The arrivals floor of Terminal 2 was refurbished in early 2011, and all the ceilings were painted between late 2013 and mid 2014. In September 2017 it was announced that Terminal 2 was to undergo a further refurbishment costing €8.4 million. This included the improvements of the toilet facilities, new flooring and new air conditioning. Pier C closed for refurbishment on 12 November 2018 and reopened on 18 March 2019 while Pier B was refurbished in the winter of 2019.

In 2022, the passport control desks, previously on the upper floor, were moved into the baggage hall, removing three baggage carousels in the process, increasing the number of desks substantially.

On 16 September 2026, changes to Terminal 2 were confirmed as part fo the Málaga Airport DORA III project, with plans being revealed on 19 July 2025. The plans consist of the demolition of Piers B and C and the refurbishment and reworking of the main terminal area. Six new boarding gates will also be constructed along the southern area of the main terminal building, which will be used for schengen flights, with non-schengen flights moving to the newly expanded Terminal 3. The terminal will also slightly be expanded to the east. Work is due to be completed in 2031.

=== Terminal 3 ===
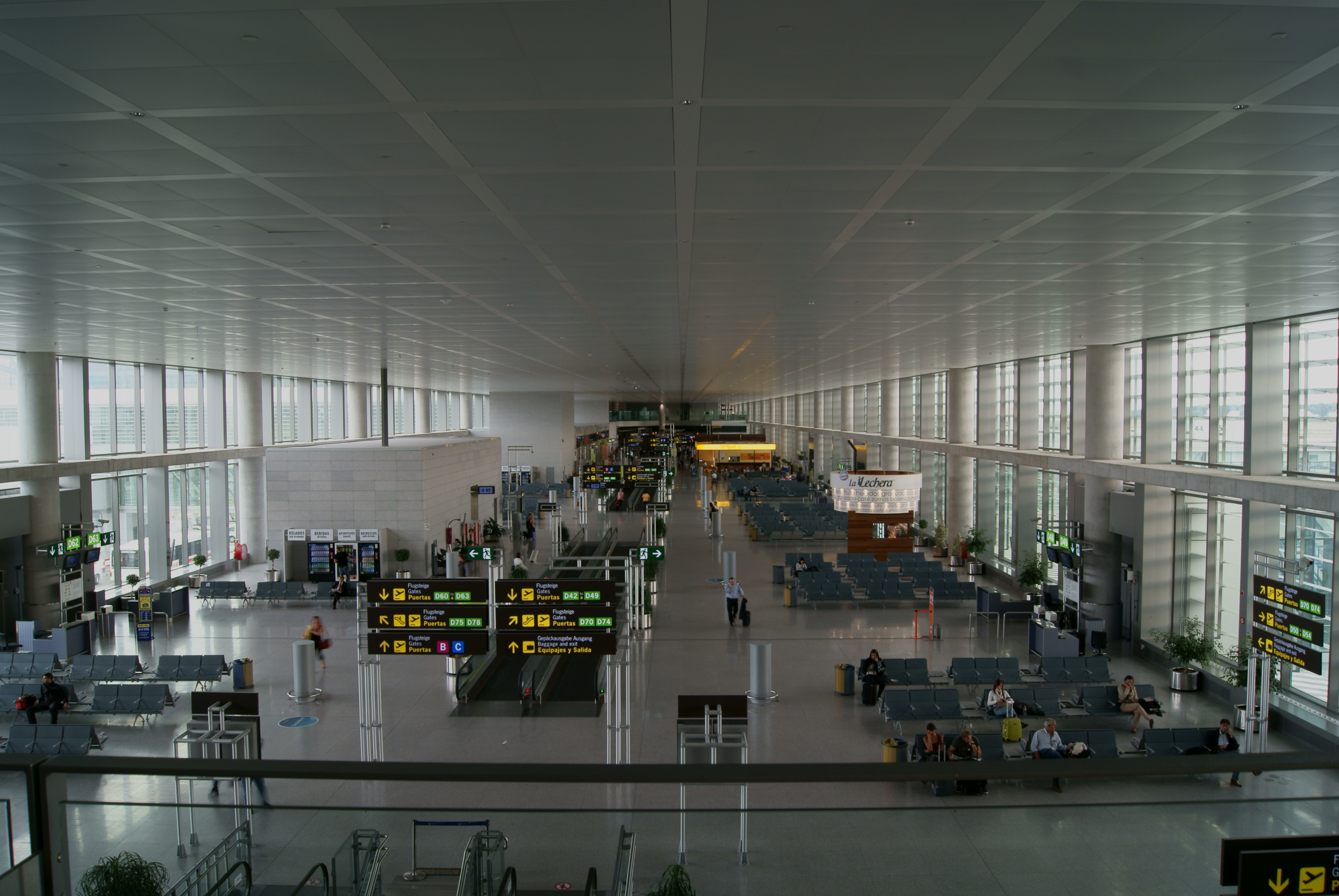
Pier D, opened on 15 March 2010

Terminal 3 (styled as T3) opened on 15 March 2010, with flight operations commencing the following day. Plans for construction started in 2001 and construction started in 2004. The works were carried out by Ferrovial. It was opened on 15 March 2010 by King Juan Carlos.

The new terminal building at Málaga Airport was designed by architect Bruce S. Fairbanks. The terminal was built to increase tourism around the Costa del Sol, and to expand the airport due to increasing number of passengers. It is adjacent to Terminal 2 and has an area of 250,000m², which is more than double the size of Terminal 2. It has 86 check-in counters, numbered 301 to 386, 20 new boarding gates, twelve which have airbridges and 12 baggage reclaim carousels; nine European Union, two non-European Union and one special baggage reclaim carousel.

The terminal has more than doubled capacity to 30 million passengers or 9,000 an hour, is expected to double the number of flights and the 12,813,764 passengers handled during 2008, and this has increased further since the new runway was completed.

In early 2024, Aena began talks of the possible expansion of Terminal 3 to increase capacity and to improve passenger experience. Later on 27 June 2025, president of Aena Maurici Lucena met with Mayor of Málaga Francisco de la Torre and the President of Provincial Council Francisco Salado where the plans for the new project, DORA III were revealed. The plans were approved on 16 September 2026 and will include a major expansion the terminal by adding a brand new Pier for non-schengen traffic, alongside a new large passport control area. In the main area of Terminal 3, the security area will also be redesigned. The terminal will be expanded by 60,000 metres and will have 24 new boarding gates. It will again be designed by architect Bruce S. Fairbanks who created the design of the original Terminal 3. The project will cost €830 million and the capacity of the airport will increase from 30 million to 36 million passengers a year, with work to be completed in 2031.

=== General aviation terminal ===
The general aviation terminal at Málaga Airport (also known as the private aviation terminal) is located next to the N-340 motorway, and close to runway 31. The terminal was formed from the old passenger terminal building, and has since been renewed and refurbished. It was opened on 29 January 1968 and is used for private jets.

=== Cargo terminal ===
The cargo terminal was opened in 1996, with 16 docking bays for road transport vehicles. It has an area of 5,700 m^{2} (61,000 sq ft) and contains four cold-storage rooms, a vault for valuable merchandise, and an area for hazardous and radioactive materials. It is located in the north of the airport, named "Carga Aena" in Spanish.

=== Other ===
A car park has been built with seven floors and 2,500 parking spaces, with underground parking for 66 coaches. A long-stay car park opened in mid-2010.

== Airlines and destinations ==
The following airlines operate regular scheduled and charter services to and from Málaga:

Airlines	Destinations
Aegean Airlines	Athens
Aer Lingus	Cork, Dublin
Air Arabia	Casablanca
Air Europa	Madrid; Seasonal: Palma de Mallorca
Air France	Paris–Charles de Gaulle
Air Serbia	Belgrade
Air Transat	Montréal–Trudeau
airBaltic	Riga, Tallinn, Tampere; Seasonal: Vilnius
arkia	Seasonal: Tel Aviv
Austrian Airlines	Vienna
British Airways	London–City, London–Gatwick, London–Heathrow; Seasonal charter: Guernsey, Isle of Man, Jersey
Brussels Airlines	Brussels
easyJet	Amsterdam, Basel/Mulhouse, Belfast–International, Berlin, Birmingham, Bordeaux, Bristol, Edinburgh, Geneva, Glasgow, Liverpool, London–Gatwick, London–Luton, London–Southend, Lyon, Manchester, Milan–Malpensa, Nantes, Newcastle upon Tyne, Nice; Seasonal: Athens, Marrakesh, Zürich
Etihad Airways	Seasonal: Abu Dhabi
Eurowings	Berlin, Cologne/Bonn, Düsseldorf, Hamburg, Hannover, Stuttgart; Seasonal: Prague
Finnair	Helsinki
FlyOne	Chișinău
Gulf Air	Seasonal: Bahrain
Icelandair	Reykjavík–Keflavík
Iberia	Madrid, Melilla, Valencia; Seasonal: León, Nice, Tangier
Israir	Seasonal: Tel Aviv
ITA Airways	Seasonal: Rome–Fiumicino
Jet2.com	Birmingham, East Midlands, Edinburgh, Glasgow, Leeds/Bradford, London–Stansted, Manchester, Newcastle upon Tyne; Seasonal: Belfast–International, Bristol, Liverpool, London–Gatwick, London-Luton (begins 21 May 2027)
KLM	Amsterdam
KM Malta Airlines	Seasonal: Malta
Kuwait Airways	Seasonal: Kuwait City
LOT Polish Airlines	Warsaw–Chopin
Lufthansa	Frankfurt, Munich
Lufthansa City Airlines	Munich
Luxair	Luxembourg
Norwegian Air Shuttle	Aalborg, Bergen, Billund, Copenhagen, Gothenburg, Helsinki, Oslo, Sandefjord, Stavanger, Stockholm–Arlanda, Stockholm–Skavsta; Seasonal: Aarhus, Haugesund, Munich, Trondheim, Växjö
Qatar Airways	Doha
Royal Air Maroc	Casablanca, Tangier, Tétouan
Riyadh Air	Seasonal: Riyadh
Ryanair	Aarhus, Amsterdam, Barcelona, Belfast–International, Bergamo, Berlin, Birmingham, Bologna, Bournemouth, Bratislava, Bremen (ends 26 March 2027), Bristol, Brno , Bucharest–Otopeni, Budapest, Charleroi, Cologne/Bonn, Copenhagen, Cork, Dublin, East Midlands, Edinburgh, Eindhoven, Exeter, Fez, Frankfurt-Hahn, Gdansk, Glasgow, Glasgow–Prestwick, Gothenburg, Hamburg, Ibiza, Karlsruhe/Baden-Baden, Katowice , Kaunas, Knock, Košice , Kraków, Lanzarote, Leeds/Bradford, Lisbon, Liverpool, Łódź, London–Luton, London–Stansted, Lübeck, Manchester, Marrakesh, Marseille, Memmingen, Milan–Malpensa, Münster/Osnabrück, Naples, Newcastle upon Tyne, Newquay, Norwich (begins 29 March 2027) Nuremberg, Ostrava, Palma de Mallorca, Pardubice, Pisa, Porto, Poznań, Prague, Rabat, Riga, Rome–Fiumicino, Saarbrücken (begins 30 March 2027), Sandefjord, Shannon, Sofia, Stockholm–Arlanda, Tangier, Teesside, Tétouan, Treviso, Trieste, Turin, Valencia, Venice, Vienna, Warsaw–Chopin, Weeze, Wrocław, Zagreb; Seasonal: Aberdeen, Bari, Beauvais, Cardiff, Menorca, Paderborn, Tenerife–South, Vitoria, Warsaw–Modlin,
Saudia	Seasonal: Riyadh
Scandinavian Airlines	Copenhagen, Gothenburg, Oslo, Stockholm–Arlanda; Seasonal: Bergen
Smartwings	Prague
Swiss International Air Lines	Geneva,Zürich
TAP Air Portugal	Lisbon
Transavia	Amsterdam, Brussels, Eindhoven, Rotterdam/The Hague, Paris-Orly; Seasonal: Lyon, Montpellier
TUI Airways	Cardiff, East Midlands, Manchester; Seasonal: Birmingham, Glasgow, London–Gatwick, Newcastle upon Tyne
TUI fly Belgium	Antwerp, Brussels, Ostend/Bruges
TUI fly Deutschland	Düsseldorf (begins 3 May 2027), Hannover (begins 2 May 2027)
Turkish Airlines	Istanbul
United Airlines	Seasonal: Newark
Volotea	Asturias, Bilbao, Bordeaux, Lyon, Madrid, Nantes, Santander; Seasonal: Brest, Lille, Limoges, San Sebastián, Strasbourg, Toulouse, Verona
Vueling	Amsterdam, Barcelona, Bilbao, Brussels, Cardiff, Fuerteventura, Gran Canaria, Lanzarote, London–Gatwick, Palma de Mallorca, Paris–Orly, Santiago de Compostela, Tenerife–North; Seasonal: Ibiza
Wizz Air	Bilbao (begins 14 December 2026), Bratislava, Bucharest–Otopeni, Budapest, Cluj-Napoca, Gdańsk, Katowice, Kraków, London–Gatwick, London-Luton, Madrid, Milan–Malpensa, Rome–Fiumicino, Santiago de Compostela (begins 1 February 2027), Sofia, Tirana, Turin, Venice, Vilnius, Warsaw–Chopin, Wrocław

== Statistics ==
Passenger numbers at Málaga increased from 6 million in 1995 to 13.6 million passengers in 2007, dropping to 12.8 million in 2008. There was a further 9.3% reduction in 2009 with passenger numbers falling to around 11.6 million and the number of aircraft movements reducing by 13.6% to 103,536. However, passenger numbers in 2010 increased to 12 million, and increased again in 2011 to 12.8 million and decreased slightly to 12.5 million in 2012. Passenger numbers increased to 12.9 million in 2013 and continued increasing until 2019 with a peak of 19.9 million. The COVID19 pandemic caused a sharp decline in 2020, with traffic falling to 5.2 million passengers. Recovering was progressive in the three years after, surpassing pre-pandemic levels in 2023. In 2025, Málaga Airport reached it highest-ever passenger total with 26.8 million passengers and 186,990 aircraft movements.

=== Annual traffic ===
Traffic by calendar year
	Passengers	Aircraft movements	Cargo (tonnes)
2000	9,443,872	92,930	9,920
2001	9,932,975	98,174	9,365
2002	10,429,439	101,519	8,670
2003	11,566,616	110,220	6,837
2004	12,046,277	116,047	6,811
2005	12,669,019	123,959	5,493
2006	13,076,252	127,776	5,399
2007	13,590,803	129,698	5,828
2008	12,813,472	119,821	4,800
2009	11,622,443	103,536	3,400
2010	12,064,616	105,631	3,064
2011	12,823,117	107,397	2,992
2012	12,581,944	102,162	2,711
2013	12,922,403	102,359	2,661
2014	13,748,976	108,261	2,498
2015	14,404,170	108,897	2,472
2016	16,672,776	123,700	2,288
2017	18,628,876	137,092	2,866
2018	19,021,704	141,313	2,768
2019	19,858,656	144,939	3.080
2020	5,161,636	59,668	912
2021	8,874,635	92,248	1,500
2022	18,457,194	144,107	2,193
2023	22,344,261	161,716	2,806
2024	24,923,774	174,915	3,588
2025	26,760,549	186,990	4,662
Source: Aena Statistics

=== Busiest routes ===
Busiest European routes from AGP (2025)
Rank	Destination	Passengers	Change 2024/25
1	London-Gatwick	1.242.931	▲3,6%
2	Amsterdam	1.051.485	▲15,3%
3	Dublin	853.423	▲2,6%
4	Brussels	643.121	▲3,5%
5	Manchester	624.856	▲0,8%
6	Copenhagen	600.262	▲4,0%
7	Paris-Orly	560.365	▲8,6%
8	Stockholm-Arlanda	546.369	▼ -5,5%
9	Rome-Fiumicino	469.637	▲3,6%
10	London-Stansted	446.514	▲2,2%
11	Bristol	422.579	▲6,6%
12	Milan-Malpensa	416.075	▲27,6%
13	Helsinki	390.247	▲9,2%
14	Birmingham	384.541	▲5,5%
15	London-Luton	371.351	▲2,5%
16	Eindhoven	368.246	▲1,9%
17	Zurich	364.756	▲13,2%
18	Liverpool	342.211	▲20,8%
19	Vienna	328.298	▼ -8,1%
20	Oslo	321.366	▼ -2,2%
Source: Estadísticas de tráfico aereo

Busiest intercontinental routes from AGP (2025)
Rank	Destination	Passengers	Change 2022/23
1	Marrakech	226.220	▲26,0%
2	Casablanca	140.667	▲43,2%
3	Tangier	97.922	▲16,6%
4	Doha	96.459	▲39,5%
5	Montréal–Trudeau	90.724	▲11,4%
6	Rabat	90.619	▲20,8%
7	Fez	70.408	▲75,8%
8	Tétouan	54.476	▲0,7%
9	Newark	45.034	▼ -1,3%
10	Abu Dhabi	42.053	▲79,4%
Source: Estadísticas de tráfico aereo

Busiest domestic routes from AGP (2025)
Rank	Destination	Passengers	Change 2024/25
1	Barcelona	1.037.267	▲2,2%
2	Madrid	650.990	▼ -6,6%
3	Palma de Mallorca	403.832	▲5,8%
4	Bilbao	355.516	▲1,1%
5	Gran Canaria	288.702	▲18,4%
6	Tenerife-North	283.738	▲15,3%
7	Melilla	245.727	▲5,2%
8	Valencia	202.500	▲22,4%
9	Ibiza	198.500	▲9,2%
10	Santiago de Compostela	194.555	▼ -16,6%
11	Lanzarote	131.837	▲52,9%
12	Asturias	103.270	▲8,5%
13	Fuerteventura	78.118	▲167,8%
14	Tenerife-South	60.208	▲46,3%
15	Santander	52.684	▲6,8%
16	Ceuta	47.509	▲3,6%
17	Menorca	45.231	▲4,6%
18	Vitoria	33.756	▲5,9%
19	A Coruña	33.202	▲2,2%
20	San Sebastián	19.199	▼ -8,2%
Source: Estadísticas de tráfico aereo

== Ground transport ==
Two roads access the airport – the MA-21 (Torremolinos–Málaga), and an access road from the MA20.

=== Transportation hub ===
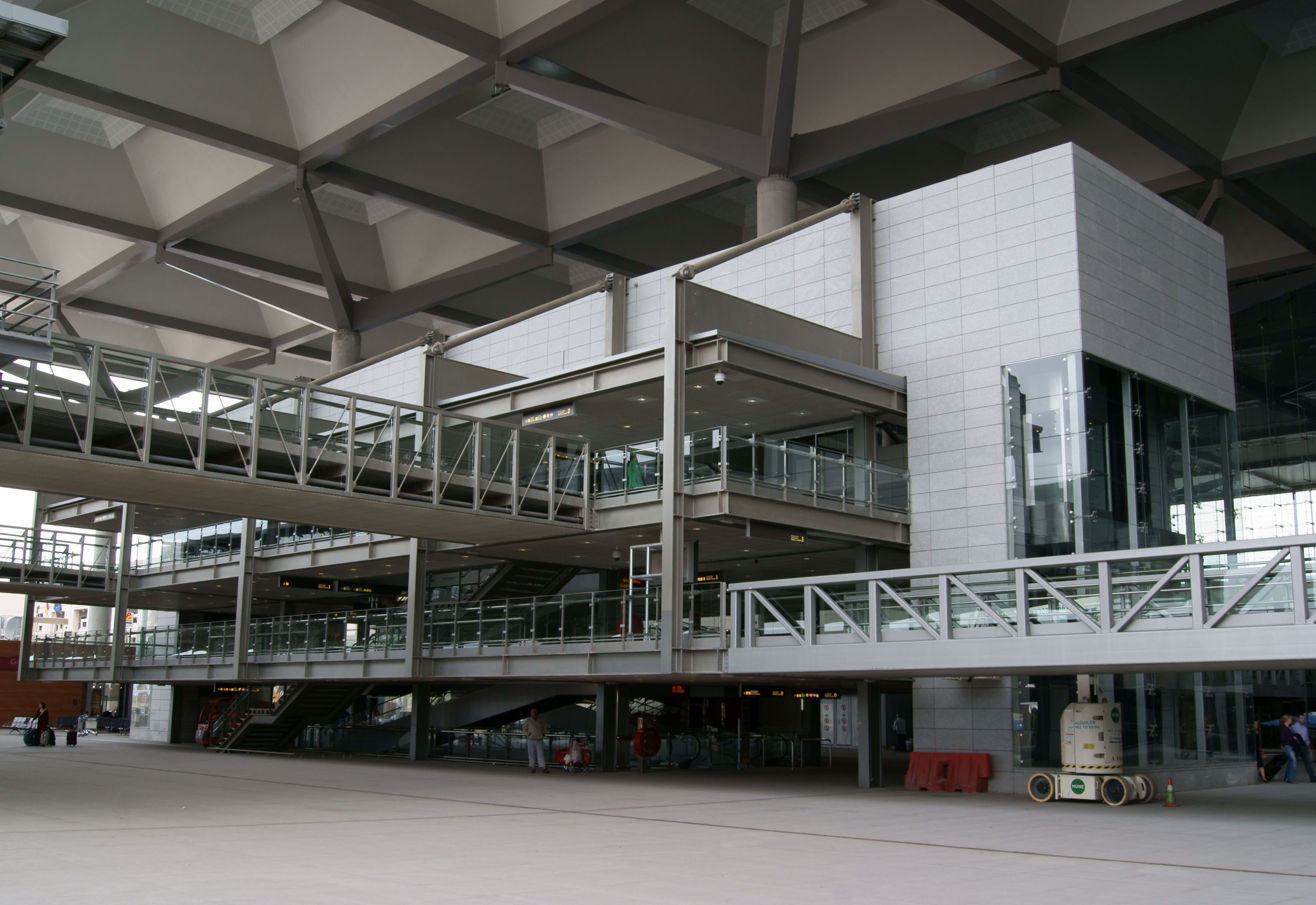
Transportation hub

Málaga Airport has a transportation hub outside terminal 3 with both arrival and departure levels. The bus station and the suburban train station and car parking can be reached from the hub.

=== Ride-hailing ===
Since 2024, the Estonian ride-hailing company Bolt has operated exclusive pickup areas at the airport.

=== Suburban railway line ===
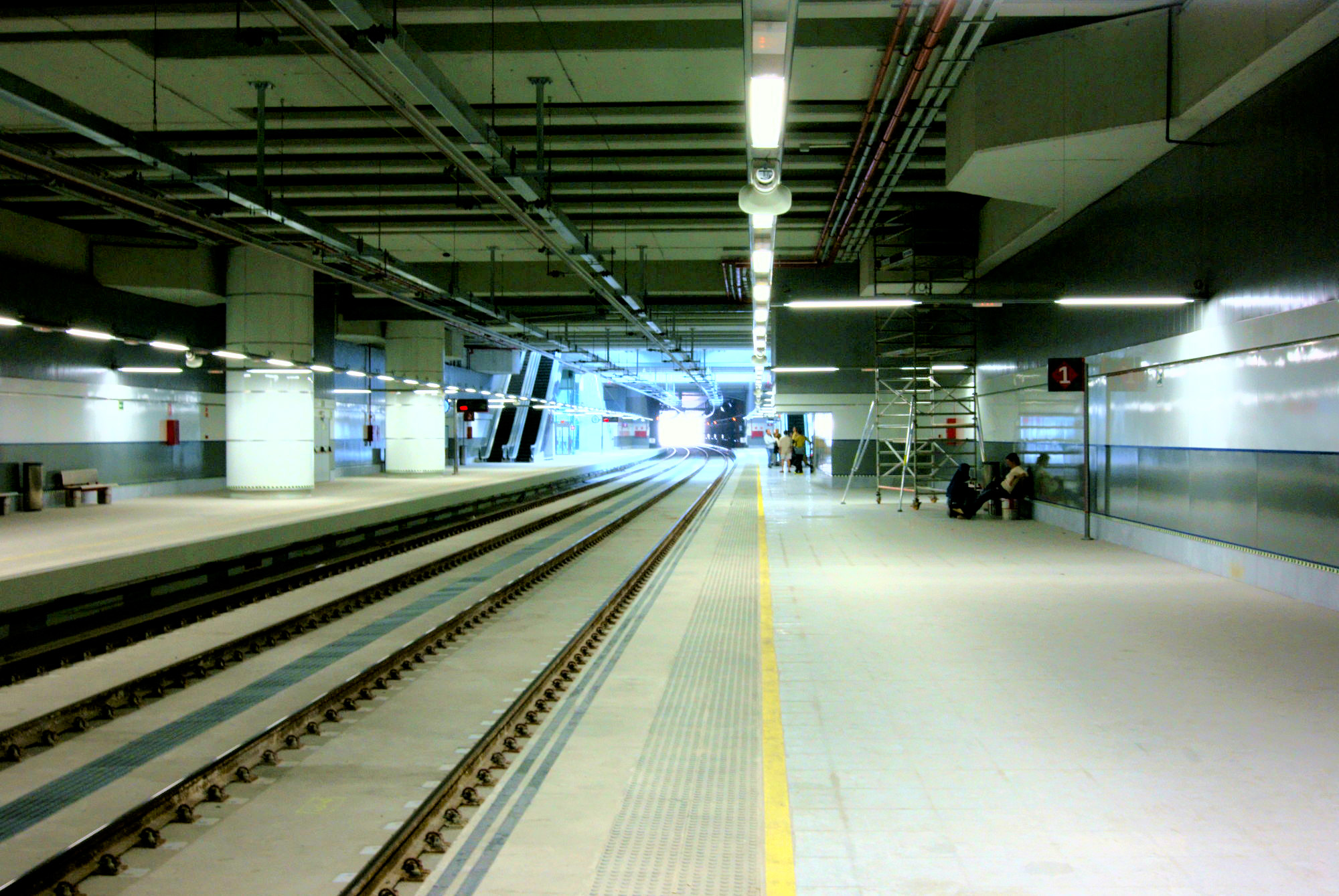
New railway station

The airport has an underground railway station connecting Cercanías Málaga commuter trains with Málaga. The station opened on 10 September 2010 and is located at the arrivals area of Terminal 3. Trains run every 20 minutes between Málaga City and Fuengirola via Málaga Airport.

=== Bus station ===
There is an underground bus station. There is also a bus stop outside the cargo terminal.

=== Car parks ===
Before Terminal 3 opened the airport had only one large car park, called P2. The airport now has two, with 3,700 spaces (1,200 in P2, 2,500 in the new P1). All outdoor spaces are covered. They can be reached by the transportation hub.

== Accidents and incidents ==
- 13 September 1964 – A Balair Fokker F-27 (registration HB-AAI) approaching the runway too high. The pilot did a steep descent and the plane landed heavily, causing part of a wing to break off. There were no fatalities. The aircraft was written off.
- 20 December 1970 – A Sobelair Douglas DC-6B (registration OO-CTL) returned to Málaga due to severe weather at the aircraft's destination. A hydraulic system failure occurred and the left main undercarriage gear failed. This caused the aircraft to veer left once it landed. There were no fatalities. The aircraft was written off.
- 13 September 1982 – Spantax Flight BX995 a DC-10-30CF (registration EC-DEG) When the aircraft was rolling for take-off, the pilot felt a strong vibration and aborted the take-off. The flightcrew lost control of the aircraft and were unable to stop in the runway length available. The aircraft overran the runway, hit an airfield aerial installation, and lost an engine. It crossed the Málaga–Torremolinos Highway, hitting three vehicles before hitting a farming construction and bursting into flames. An emergency evacuation of the aircraft was carried out but 50 on board died, and a further 110 persons were hospitalized. The cause of the accident was the detachment of fragments from a recapped tread on the right wheel of the nose gear, creating vibration.
- 13 October 2000 – The hijacked Sabena Flight 689 operated by an Airbus A330-200 en route from Brussels to Abidjan made an emergency landing at Málaga where the perpetrator, a Nigerian national, was overpowered by police.
- 29 August 2001 – Binter Mediterráneo Flight BIM8261 a CASA CN-235 (registration EC-FBC) was on a flight from Melilla to Málaga. On final approach, the aircraft's left engine failed, and the aircraft made an emergency landing. The plane hit the first edge lights and stopped next to the N-340. Investigation into the accident revealed that shortly after the initial engine failure, the First Officer inadvertently shut down both of the aircraft's engines, leading to a total loss of power. Four out of the 44 people on board were killed, including the pilot Capt. Bernardo Hernández Ruano. The aircraft was written off.

== See also ==
- ENAIRE
- List of works by Ricardo Bofill Taller de Arquitectura
