= Primera Air Scandinavia =

Danish airline

Primera Air Scandinavia A/S

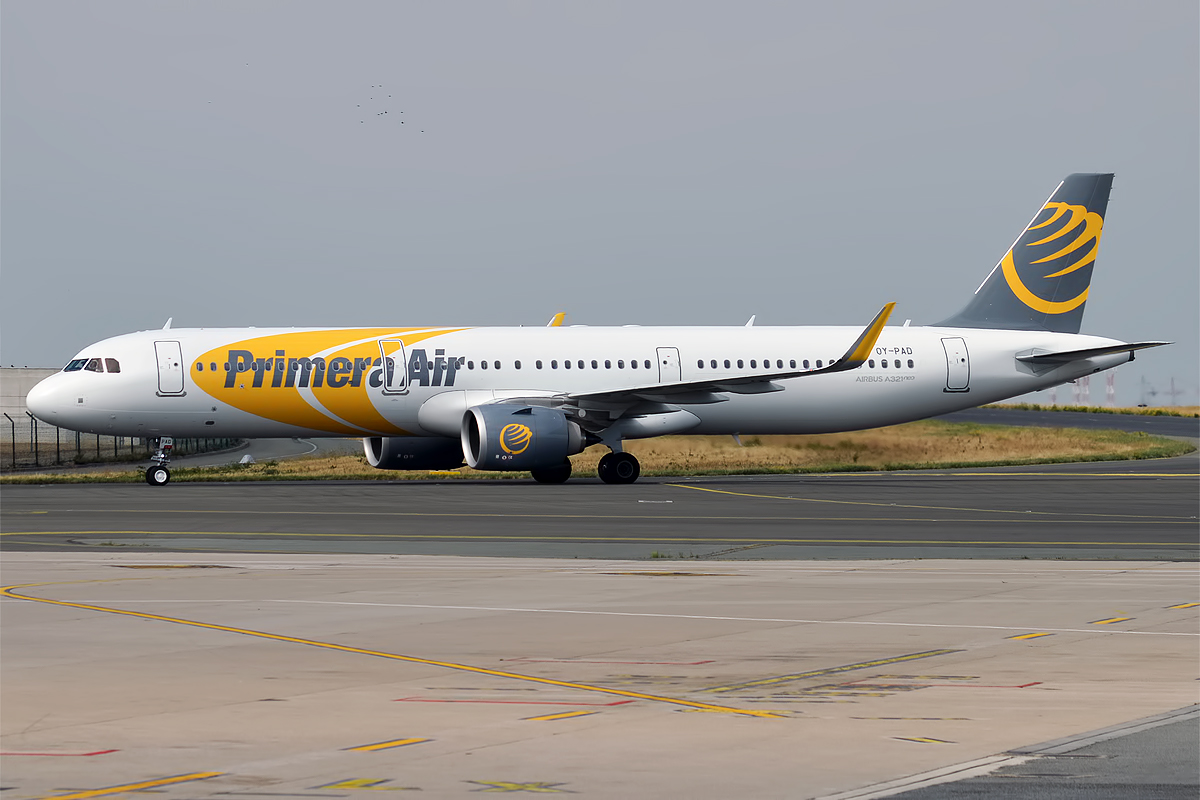
- Airbus A321neo
IATA	ICAO	Call sign
PF	PRI	PRIMERA
- Founded: 2003 (JetX); 2009 (Primera Air Scandinavia)
- Ceased operations: 2 October 2018
- Operating bases: Aalborg; Billund; Birmingham; Copenhagen; Gothenburg; London–Stansted; Paris–Charles de Gaulle; Reykjavík–Keflavík; Stockholm–Arlanda
- Subsidiaries: Primera Air Nordic
- Fleet size: 7
- Destinations: 41
- Parent company: Primera Travel Group
- Headquarters: Copenhagen, Denmark
- Key people: Hrafn Thorgeirsson (CEO); Andri Már Ingólfsson (President & owner)
- Employees: 1000
- Website: primeraair.com

Primera Air Scandinavia A/S, was a Danish airline owned by Primera Travel Group. It provided scheduled and charter passenger services from Northern Europe to more than 40 destinations in the Mediterranean, Middle East and North America. It ceased operations on 1 October 2018.

The airline was originally founded in Iceland as JetX, before it was acquired by Primera Travel Group and renamed Primera Air Scandinavia. In 2009/2010, operations were transferred to a newly founded Danish unit and the Icelandic air operator's certificate was subsequently cancelled. The airline also owned Primera Air Nordic, a Latvian subsidiary airline established in 2014.

== History ==
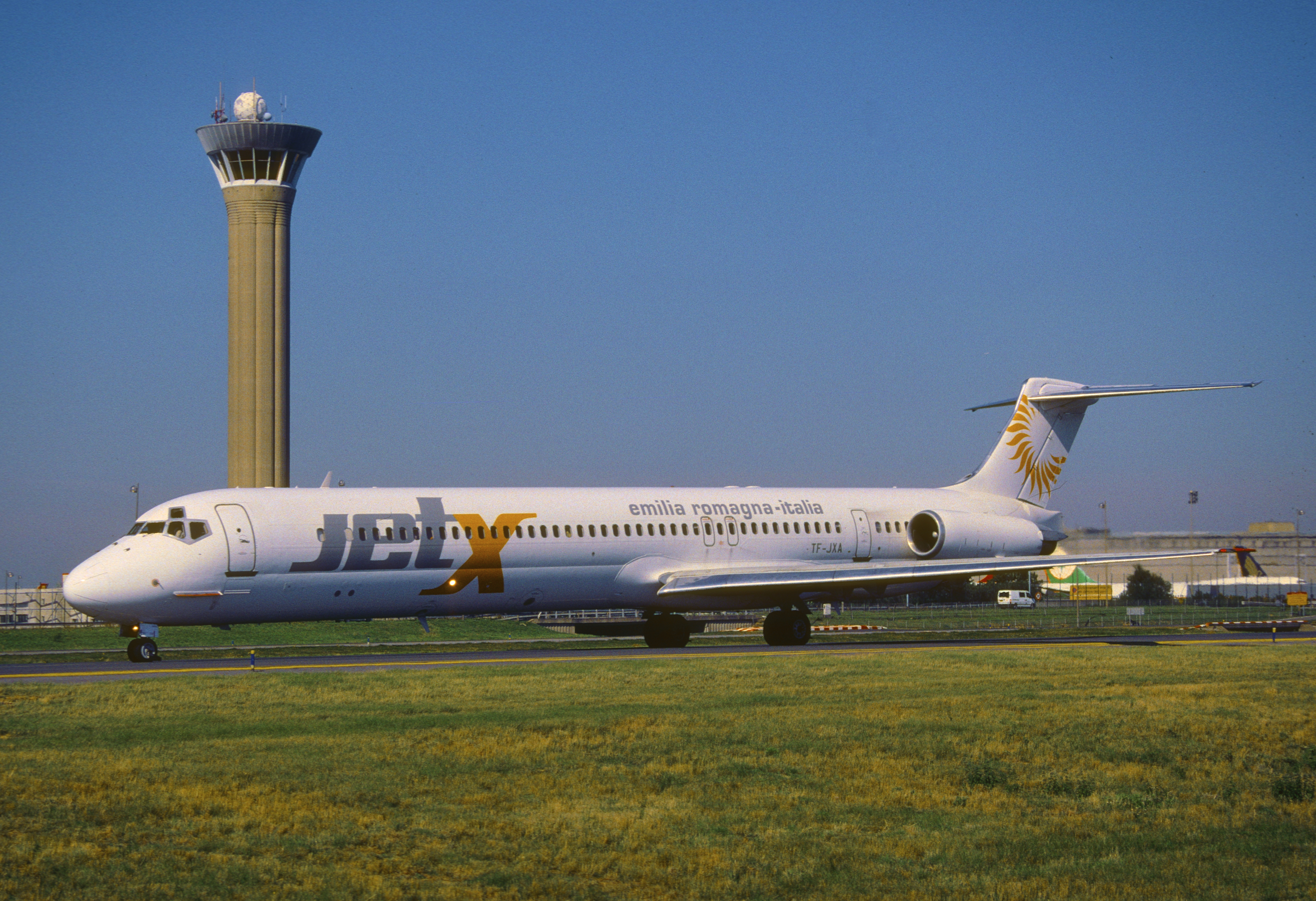
JetX McDonnell Douglas MD-82, 2004

=== Icelandic origins ===
Primera Air Scandinavia began as the airline JetX (IATA: GX, ICAO: JXX) in Iceland. The company was founded in 2003 and received its air operator's certificate in May 2004. Initially the airline flew a single McDonnell Douglas MD-82 but soon added a second one. Between July and October 2004, scheduled flights were carried out of Forlì in Italy. Flights were subsidized by local authorities, but the operation was impaired by non-payment of subsidies and further issues.

In 2006, Primera Travel Group, an Icelandic tourism operator with subsidiaries in several countries, bought a controlling interest and Jón Karl Ólafsson was named chairman in 2008.

=== Transition to Denmark and Latvia, short-haul expansion ===
In 2009, Primera Travel Group launched Primera Air Scandinavia as a Danish subsidiary, initially equipped with a single Boeing 737 based at Billund Airport, operated by the Icelandic Primera Air. The same year, Primera Air Scandinavia received its own air operator's certificate from the Danish authorities to commence its own operations. Subsequently, the Icelandic unit was closed and all operations were transferred to the Danish airline in 2010.

Initially, Primera Air Scandinavia operated charter flights for major Scandinavian tour operators, but gradually started selling surplus seats as "flight-only" tickets on some of the fixed charter flights in 2013. The continued success allowed Primera to increase both the number of routes and flight frequency, resulting in a mixed charter/scheduled carrier business model. In late 2014 Primera launched 10 new winter and summer direct flight destinations from Iceland, namely, Las Palmas, Tenerife, Alicante, Salzburg, Malaga, Mallorca and Barcelona, Bologna, Crete and Bodrum.

The airline transitioned to mostly scheduled flight operations, although some flights combined charter and regular passengers, and separate full charter flight services were available.

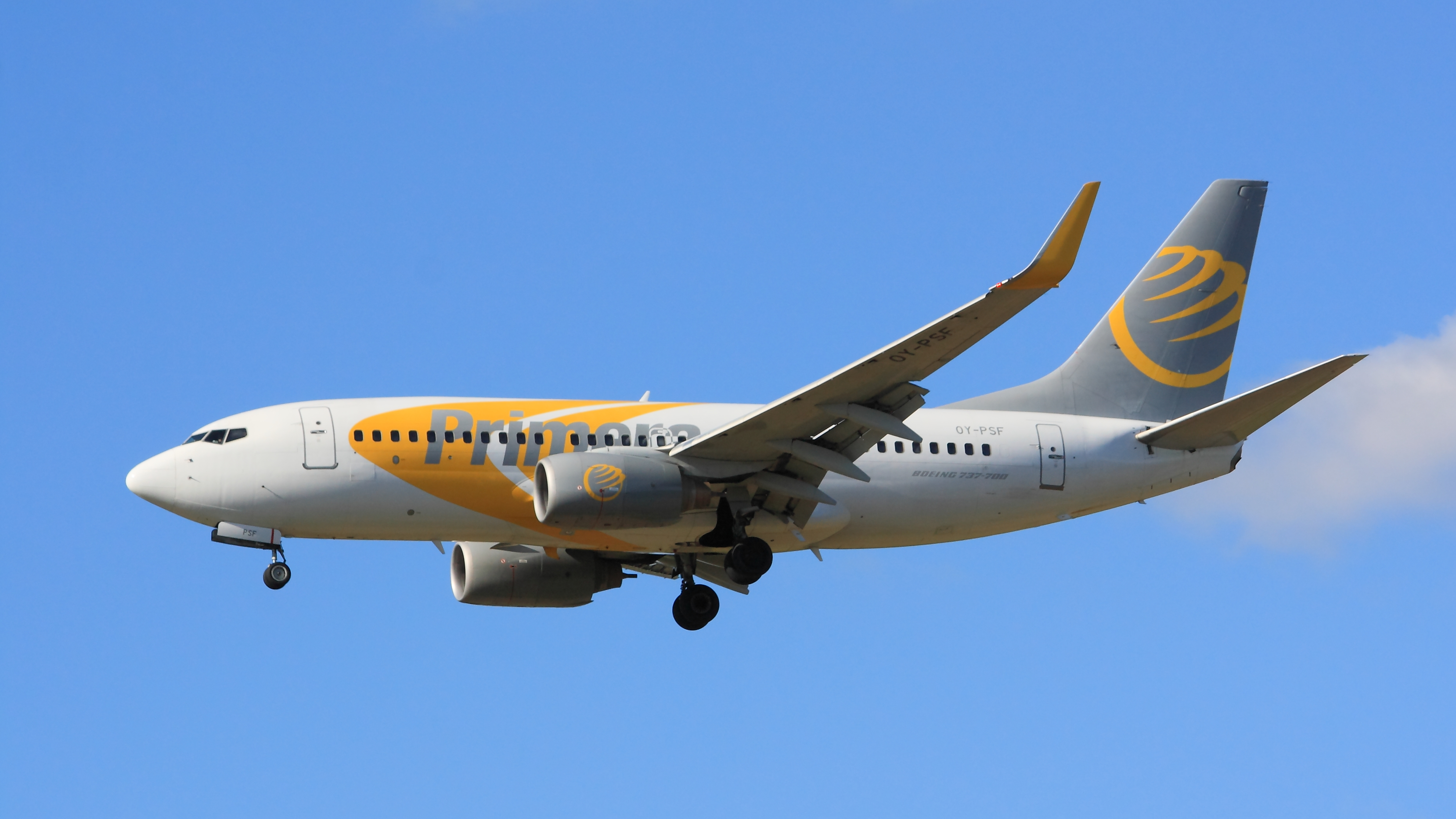
Primera Air Boeing 737-700

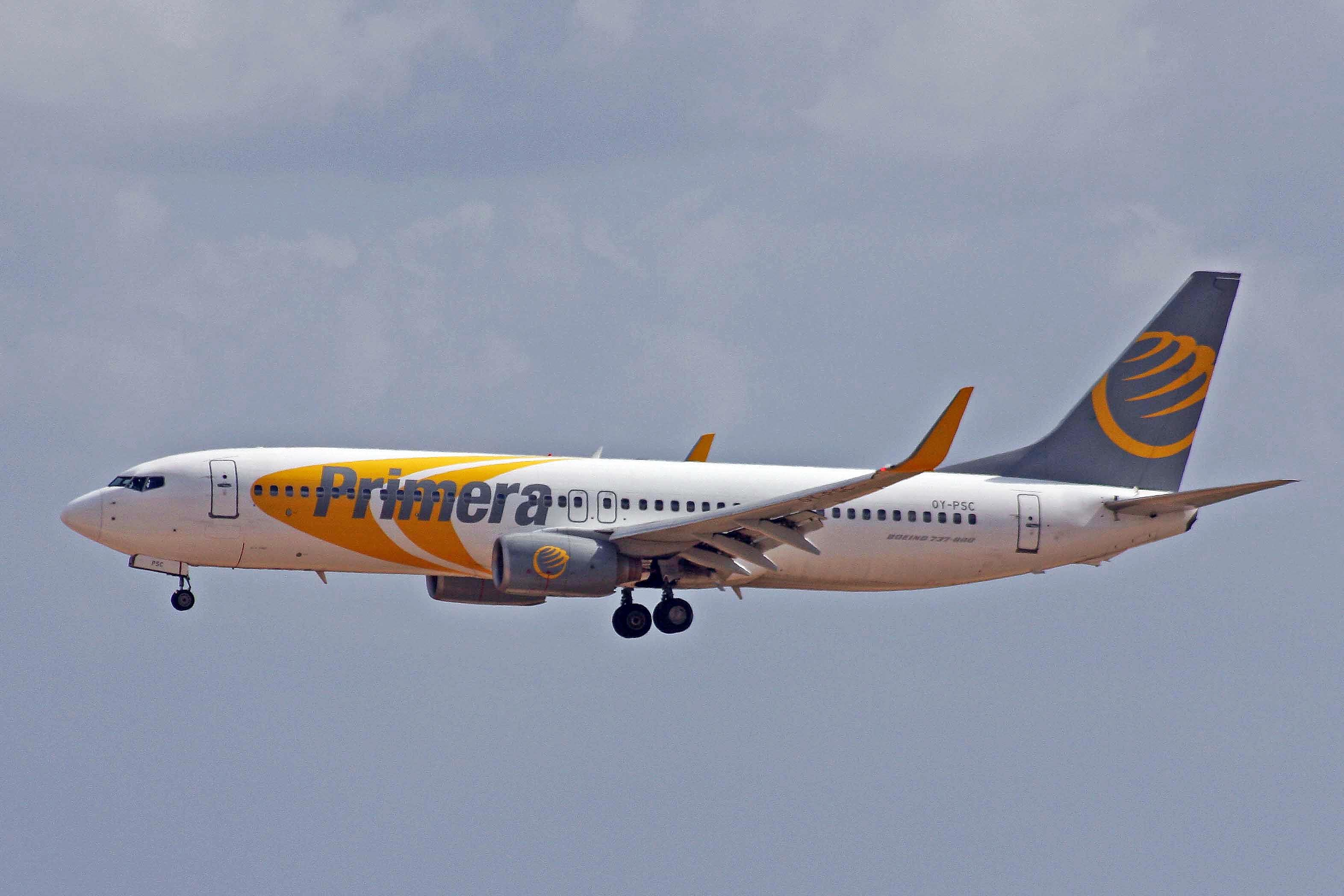
Primera Air Boeing 737-800

In August 2014 Primera Air Travel Group announced the founding of a new airline as Primera Air Nordic in Latvia, which would be run parallel to Primera Air Scandinavia. Simultaneously, a new Network Control Center was opened in Riga for overseeing all operational matters of the group's airlines. Hrafn Thorgeirsson was appointed as the new CEO of both Primera Air Scandinavia and Primera Air Nordic.

On 26 October 2014 Primera Air Scandinavia launched weekly flights from Gothenburg and Malmö to Dubai (Al Maktoum) and Tenerife, from Helsinki to Fuerteventura and Las Palmas. On November 16 the airline commenced a new route from Keflavik to New York (JFK) after acquiring rights to serve the United States. Later that year the airline started four new weekly routes, which included Aalborg to Las Palmas, Copenhagen to Lanzarote via Billund, as well as Aarhus to Tenerife and Fuerteventura.

In July 2014 Primera Air flew 155,000 passengers in 1,006 flights, with an average load factor of 91%.

The major restructuring and consolidation had a positive impact on the airline. In 2015, the airline operated eight aircraft with a turnover of US$250 million, and earned more than 5.2 million euros in total revenue before taxes (EBITDA). During the first 8 months of 2016, the airline had earned 4 million euros with an estimate of 7.60 million by the end of the year.

In 2015, Primera Air Scandinavia signed agreements worth 30 million euros with several leading travel agencies in France for operating a series of flights with 2 aircraft from Charles de Gaulle airport to popular holiday destinations during summer.

In February 2016, Croatian destinations Dubrovnik and Pula were added to the range of flight destinations. In May 2016, the airline commenced regular flights from Billund to Nice and Venice. Shortly afterwards, flights to Antalya were introduced. Later that year Primera Air announced the increase in frequency for existing destinations as well as new destinations (Milan Malpensa and Rome Fiumicino) from Stockholm for the summer season of 2017, which was done in an effort to strengthen its operations and presence in Sweden and in line with its plans for further fleet and destination range expansion. Later that year Trieste, Almería and Lamezia Terme were added as destinations.

Summer 2017 saw the addition of routes to Kalamata, Ponta Delgada and Madeira.

=== Long-haul flights and massive expansion ===
In 2017, the airline decided to venture into the scheduled low-cost transatlantic market from 2018. Flights between North America and Europe at the time were a highly competitive market, but adapting low-cost operations on this market did not show any great success for other carriers. Norwegian Air Shuttle, once a profitable short- and medium-haul budget airline, aggressively expanded on the long-haul market leading to large losses.

The long-haul debut was announced in July 2017, and initially consisted of services on six routes from Birmingham, London Stansted and Paris Charles de Gaulle to Boston and Newark. The services were due to start between April and June 2018 using brand-new Airbus A321neo aircraft to be delivered to the airline. In February 2018, the airline announced one additional long-haul route from London Stansted, connecting it to Washington, D.C., from August 2018.

The airline also scheduled medium-haul services from the UK, connecting Palma and Malaga from Birmingham and Alicante and Malaga from London Stansted. The routes were to be commenced in April and May 2018, using Boeing 737-800 aircraft. Furthermore, the airline also expanded its 2018 leisure network from Scandinavia with flights to Athens, Kos and Zakynthos from Copenhagen, Billund, and Stockholm. Primera Air also announced increased flight frequency for flights to its most popular destinations in southern Spain, and the pricing policy on these routes had allowed it to compete with the low-cost carrier Norwegian Air Shuttle.

The launch of transatlantic flights from the United Kingdom and France to the United States in the summer of 2018 was impacted by the late delivery of the planned Airbus A321neo fleet. In order to commence its routes, the airline had to charter a Boeing 767-300ER from EuroAtlantic Airways and a Boeing 757-200 from National Airlines. Citing delivery delays by Airbus of its A321neo fleet, Primera soon cancelled all transatlantic operations at Birmingham Airport scheduled on or after 21 June 2018. Transatlantic flights to and from Birmingham were expected to resume in 2019. However, in July 2018, Primera Air announced it would terminate all operations at Birmingham Airport by October 2018.

In August 2018, the airline announced two new bases in Brussels and Berlin Tegel for 2019, using Boeing 737 MAX 9 aircraft. The announced routes were from Brussels to Newark in May 2019, and in June 2019, routes from both Brussels and Berlin to Boston and Washington, D.C., and from Berlin to New York JFK and Toronto the same month. In September 2018, Primera announced two more transatlantic bases in Europe to open in 2019; one in Frankfurt and one in Madrid. The routes announced for Frankfurt were to New York JFK and Boston in June 2019, and to Montréal and Toronto in July 2019, while the routes announced for Madrid were to Newark in July 2019, and to Boston and Toronto in August 2019, also to be operated with the Boeing 737 MAX 9.

=== Collapse ===
The airline had struggled to run profitably for years, and although the airline achieved a profit in 2017, it was mainly due to the sale of aircraft. The airline also paid over US$20 million to charter or wet lease aircraft due to the late delivery of its Airbus A321neo fleet, alongside other unforeseen expenses. Unable to obtain further financing to accommodate the resulting losses, Primera announced in a statement dated 30 September 2018 that it would cease operations effective 2 October 2018, citing a poor financial standing from the write-off of an aircraft from corrosion, delivery delays of the Airbus A321neo aircraft and resultant wet leasing, and being unable to secure long-term financing. The final flight to land was PF596 from Málaga to Copenhagen.

From April 2018, the airline had canceled some flights; customers said that as of the date of bankruptcy they had not yet received promised compensation. Neither passengers nor employees received advance notice of the shutdown, and many planes were in the air at the time of the decision. Some passengers learned that the airline was shut down while in line to board the plane. Many people, including employees, were stranded at foreign airports.

Despite the bankruptcy of its airline subsidiary, Primera Travel Group continued to operate its various travel agencies and tour operators in Scandinavia but changed its name to TravelCo Nordic in October 2018. Still, the group faced huge losses due to the collapse of Primera Air. 2018 was closed with a loss of 156m DKK. This by far exceeded all profits made in previous years. TravelCo Nordic subsequently folded in late 2020 in wake of the Corona crisis and ceased trading.

== Destinations ==
Primera Air Scandinavia mostly operated return flights from its Scandinavian airports to popular holiday destinations along the Mediterranean coast of Europe and Africa, the Canary Islands, the Azores, Madeira, Bulgaria and Turkey, as well as custom charter flights to virtually any destination. The airline maintained seasonal summer and winter selections.

The airline had launched transatlantic operations from April 2018, connecting France and the United Kingdom to Canada and the United States.

At the time of closure, the airline had served several routes, but further announced long-haul flights from Berlin, Brussels, Frankfurt, and Madrid never commenced.

== Criticism ==
Primera Travel Group's airlines were criticized for working conditions and alleged social dumping. Cabin crew working for the Primera Air Nordic unit were recruited through recruitment agencies, with the staff mostly originating from Romania, but based in Scandinavia. Wages were significantly lower than standard Scandinavian wages, and employment contracts included very limited payments in the event of illness and lacked paid vacation leave.

== Fleet ==
At the time of bankruptcy and cessation of operations on 2 October 2018, the Primera Air Scandinavia fleet consisted of the following aircraft:

Aircraft	In service	Orders	Passengers			Notes
Aircraft	In service	Orders	C	Y	Total	Notes
Airbus A321LR	—	2	16	182	198	Originally launch customer. Were to be leased from AerCap, with deliveries in 2018.
Airbus A321neo	5	1	16	182	198	6 were ordered, but only 5 were delivered.
Boeing 737-800	2	1	—	189	189	1 was due secondhand from Air China in 2018 but was never delivered.
Boeing 737 MAX 9	—	18	TBA			Original order for 16 with 4 purchase rights, with 2 purchase rights exercised. 8 were to be leased from Air Lease Corporation. Deliveries were planned from November 2018.
Total	7	22				

At closure, there were seven aircraft registered to Primera Air. A further seven aircraft were registered to subsidiary Primera Air Nordic, whose operations were fully integrated into those of the parent company.

Despite financial woes, Primera continued its ambitious expansion and accepted aircraft deliveries, with a Boeing 737-800, registered OY-PSJ, as the final aircraft to be taken into service. The aircraft commenced revenue services on 20 September 2018, just eleven days before the airline folded. Further aircraft destined for the carrier were in production at the time the airline folded, including an Airbus A321neo that was fully painted and a Boeing 737 MAX 9 that was partially painted in Primera's livery.
