= Primera Air Nordic =

Latvian charter airline

PrimeraAir Nordic SIA
IATA	ICAO	Call sign
6F	PRW	JETBIRD
- Founded: 2014
- Ceased operations: 2 October 2018
- Operating bases: Gothenburg; Reykjavík–Keflavík; Stockholm–Arlanda
- Fleet size: 7
- Destinations: 14
- Parent company: Primera Travel Group
- Headquarters: Riga, Latvia
- Key people: Hrafn Thorgeirsson (CEO)
- Website: primeraair.com

PrimeraAir Nordic SIA was a leisure airline headquartered in Riga, Latvia owned by the Primera Travel Group. It provided scheduled and charter passenger services to leisure destinations from Northern Europe. It ceased operations on 2 October 2018.

== History ==
The airline was founded in 2014 by the Primera Travel Group to complement the Danish based Primera Air Scandinavia. The company also opened a Network Control Center in Riga for overseeing all operational matters of both Primera Air Scandinavia and Primera Air Nordic. Hrafn Thorgeirsson was appointed as the new CEO of both airlines.

On 30 September 2018, Primera Air Group announced that the company was declaring bankruptcy and that the operations of both Primera Air and Primera Air Nordic would cease effective 2 October 2018, after failing to secure long term financing.

== Fleet ==
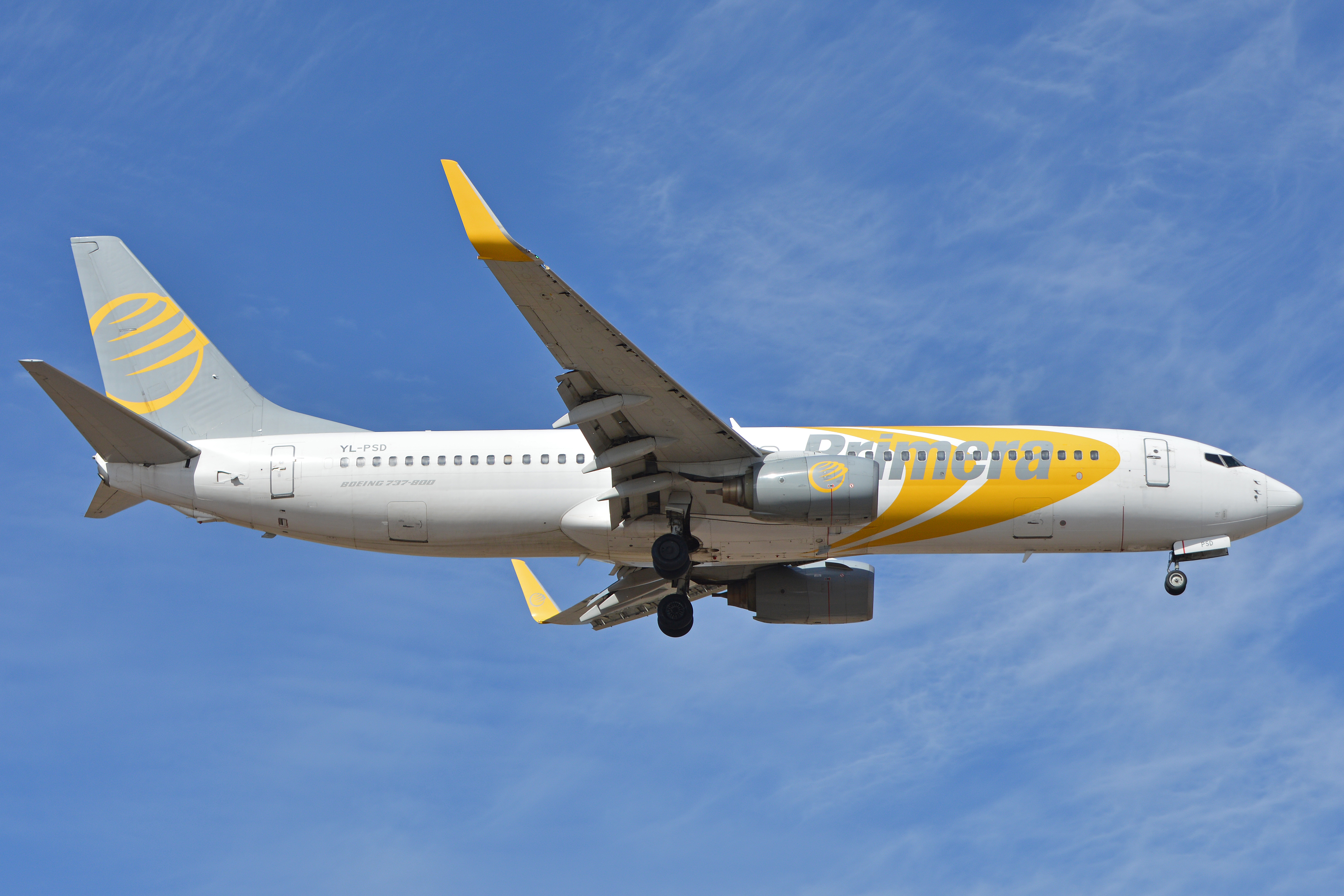
Primera Air Nordic Boeing 737-800

At the time of Primera Air Nordic's bankruptcy on 1 October 2018, the fleet consisted of the following aircraft:

Aircraft	In Service	Orders	Passengers			Notes
Aircraft	In Service	Orders	C	Y	Total	Notes
Boeing 737-700	2	—	—	148	148	
Boeing 737-800	5	—	—	189	189	
Total	7	—				
