= Helitt Líneas Aéreas =

Spanish charter airline

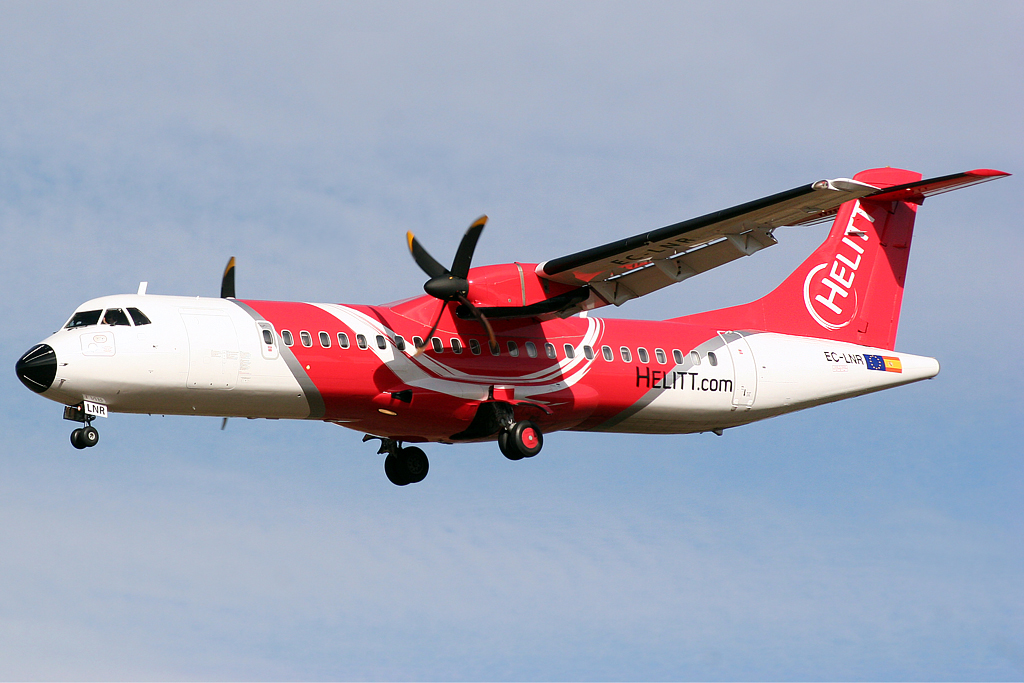
IATA	ICAO	Call sign
H9	HTH	ALBORAN
- Founded: 2011
- Commenced operations: November 2011
- Ceased operations: October 2014
- Operating bases: Málaga Airport
- Fleet size: 3
- Headquarters: Málaga, Spain
- Website: helitt.com

Helitt Líneas Aéreas was a Spanish charter airline based in Málaga, with its main base at Málaga Airport.

== History ==
The airline was founded in 2009 and began operations on November 21, 2011, with its inaugural route flying between Málaga and Melilla. A week later, Helitt began operating a route connecting Melilla to Barcelona. On December 2, 2011, Helitt began flying from Melilla to Madrid, and on December 21, 2011, it launched its Málaga to Madrid route.

The first new route of 2012, from Barcelona to San Sebastián, was launched on January 3, which was followed on January 20 by a Madrid - San Sebastián route. On March 24, Helitt began flying to Nador from Málaga and Palma de Mallorca. March 25 saw the creation of new routes to Badajoz, thus making Helitt the airport's sole carrier, connecting Badajoz to Madrid, Barcelona, and Málaga.

In late 2012, due to a lack of management and internal economic crisis, the airline suspended all scheduled flights; in February 2013, it cancelled all remaining scheduled flights, becoming a full-charter airline. As a charter and ACMI operator, Helitt operated under numerous ACMI contracts for other airlines, including Croatian Airlines, B&H Airlines, Darwin Airline, and Royal Air Maroc.

In October 2014, Helitt filed for bankruptcy and ceased all remaining operations.

== Destinations ==
From 2009 until 2013, Hellit Líneas Aéreas served destinations in Morocco and Spain on a scheduled basis. From February 2013 through October 2014, Helitt operated charter flights to destinations in Europe and Northern Africa.

== Fleet ==
The Helitt Líneas Aéreas fleet included the following aircraft as of November 26, 2011:

Helitt Líneas Aéreas fleet
Aircraft	Total	Orders	Passengers (Economy)	Notes
ATR 72-200	3	2	66	
Total	3	2		
