= Pacific Pearl Airways =

Philippine airline (2006–2015)

IATA	ICAO	Call sign
-	PPM	PACIFIC PEARL
- Founded: 2006
- Ceased operations: 2015
- Hubs: Subic Bay International Airport
- Fleet size: 1
- Destinations: 4
- Headquarters: Makati, Philippines
- Key people: Eligio Jimenez (Chairman); Kristoffer Miel Jimenez (President and CEO)
- Website: www.pacificpearlairways.com

Pacific Pearl Airways was an airline based in Subic Bay International Airport, Philippines. The airline flies from Manila, South Korea, Subic, Aklan, Cebu, Davao and Palawan. The Airline has also expressed their intentions to fly Scheduled Charter flights around the Philippine Islands.

Pacific Pearl Airways has also inquired about space at Mactan–Cebu International Airport to commence service from Cebu to various Asian countries and Regional Philippine Destinations. As of April 2015 the airline is inactive and appears to be defunct.

== History ==
On July 6, 2007, Pacific Pearl's initial aircraft RP-C8777, a former Delta Air Lines 737-200, was ferried via Salinas, Honolulu, the Marshall Islands, and Guam. Its final destination was Subic Bay International Airport. She was flown as "316 Delta Lima".

In Manila on July 27, Subic Bay freeport inaugurated Pacific Pearl Airways, a low-cost carrier, with Philippine President Arroyo gracing the event. Pacific Pearl Airways also announced that they entered into an agreement with the SBMA to lease a hangar within Subic Bay International Airport (SBIA). Pacific Pearl Airways has also confirmed regular charter flights from Subic Bay International Airport to Kalibo beginning August 17, 2007, with scheduled flights to and from; Manila, Subic, Aklan, Cebu and Davao to begin this August as well. On that same day, Pacific Pearl Airways CEO, Jimenez, told reporters that his company's aircraft will make flights starting August 17, with the maiden flight leaving Subic Bay International Airport bound for Palawan, Aklan and Cebu.

On November 11, 2007, at the latest BIMP-EAGA meeting between ASEAN member nations, an Air Pact was formed between the BIMP (Brunei, Indonesia, Malaysia, Philippines) region, with Pacific Pearl Airways expected to begin flights internationally to Brunei and Davao.

== Destinations ==
Pacific Pearl Airways initially serve the following airports:

- Philippines
  - Cebu (Mactan–Cebu International Airport)
  - Kalibo (Kalibo International Airport)
  - Puerto Princesa (Puerto Princesa International Airport)
  - Subic (Subic Bay International Airport) - main hub

Note: Pacific Pearl Airways has also confirmed plans for regular charter flights around the Philippines.

== Fleet ==
Current Fleet of Pacific Pearl Airways (May, 2008).

=== Current ===
Pacific Pearl Airways Fleet
Aircraft	Total (Service)	Passengers (Economy)	Routes	Notes
Boeing 737-200adv.	2	112-114	Domestic, Intra-Asia, Charter	One airframe (RP-C8777) stood derilect at Subic Bay International Airport since 2007
