= Pacific Coast Jet =

Airline based in California, US

IATA	ICAO	Call sign
-	PXT	PACK COAST
- Founded: 2006
- Hubs: Oakland International Airport
- Secondary hubs: Hayward Airport
- Fleet size: 20+
- Destinations: Worldwide
- Headquarters: Oakland California, United States
- Website: https://pacificcoastjet.com

Pacific Coast Jet is an aircraft charter and management company based in the Bay Area of Northern California.

== History ==
Pacific Coast Jet LLC was formed in early 2006 in northern California with the goal of making private jet transportation affordable to executives, business owners and individuals who could not previously justify the expense of this convenience.

== Fleet ==
The Pacific Coast Jet fleet consists of the following aircraft: (as of December 2022)

Total	Type	Passengers
1	Cessna Citation X	8
2	Cessna Citation Sovereign	9
1	Cessna Citation XLS	8
1	Embraer Phenom 300	7
6	Cessna Citation CJ3	6-7
3	Cessna Citation CJ2	6-7
3	Cessna Citation CJ1+	4
1	Pilatus PC-12NG	8
