= Foronda =

Hamlet in Álava, Spain

- Concejo
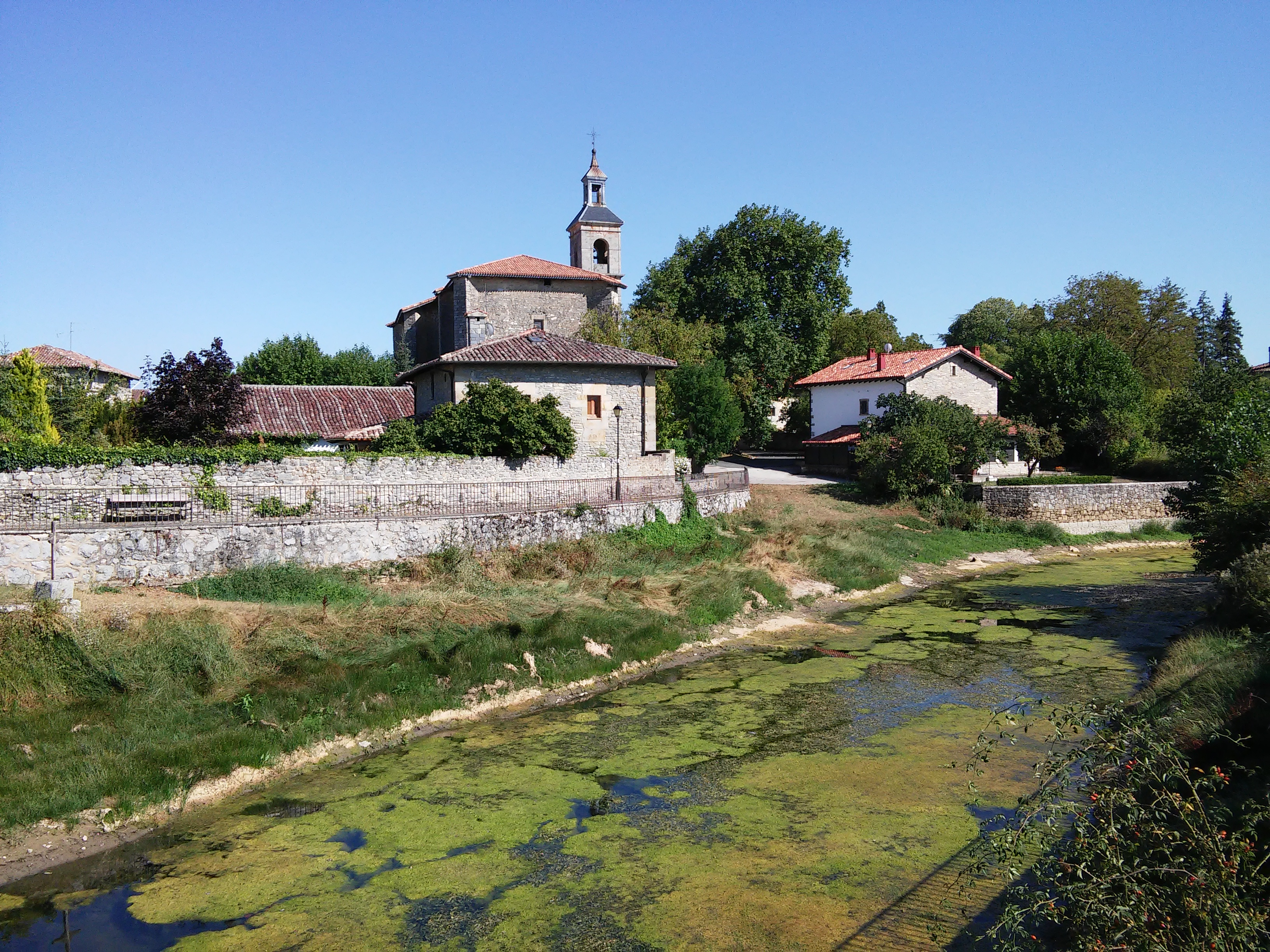
- View of the Zalla river and the parish church in Foronda

- Location within Álava Location within the Basque Country Location within Spain
- Coordinates: 42°53′54″N 2°43′22″W
- Country: Spain
- Autonomous community: Basque Country
- Province: Álava
- Comarca: Vitoria-Gasteiz
- Municipality: Vitoria-Gasteiz

Area
  - Total: 3.51 km^{2} (1.36 sq mi)
- Elevation: 517 m (1,696 ft)

Population (2022)
  - Total: 47
  - Density: 13/km^{2} (35/sq mi)
- Postal code: 01196

Foronda is a hamlet and concejo in the municipality of Vitoria-Gasteiz, in Álava province, Basque Country, Spain. It is located next to the Zalla river and in close proximity to Vitoria Airport.

== Climate ==
This region experiences warm (but not hot) and dry summers, August has the warmest month with an average temperature of 19.1 °C (66.4 °F). According to the Köppen Climate Classification system, Foronda has a marine west coast climate, abbreviated "Cfb" on climate maps.
