= Palau Trans Pacific Airlines =

IATA	ICAO	Call sign
GP	-	-
- Commenced operations: October 2002
- Ceased operations: March 2005
- Fleet size: 1 Boeing 737
- Destinations: Taipei, Taiwan
- Headquarters: Koror City, Palau

Palau Trans Pacific (Palau Trans Pacific Airlines) was an airline based in Koror City, Palau. It was a regional airline linking Palau with key cities in East Asia, including Taipei, using wet-leased aircraft from Far Eastern Air Transport. It is not clear if the airline is still operational.

== Code data ==
- IATA Code: GP

== History ==
The airline was established in 2002 and started operations in October 2002 using a Boeing 737-800 on a two-year wet lease contract from Mandarin Airlines. Palau Trans Pacific passenger services between Palau and Taiwan were suspended in May 2003 due to concerns about SARS. Operations were suspended in March 2005. Midcorp, a Palau-based company controlled by local businessman and senator Alan Seid, then bought Palau Trans Pacific Airlines in October 2005, for the foreign air operator's certificate it had retained
