= Vitoria Airport =

Vitoria Airport: Aeropuerto de Vitoria (Spanish); Gasteizko aireportua (Basque)

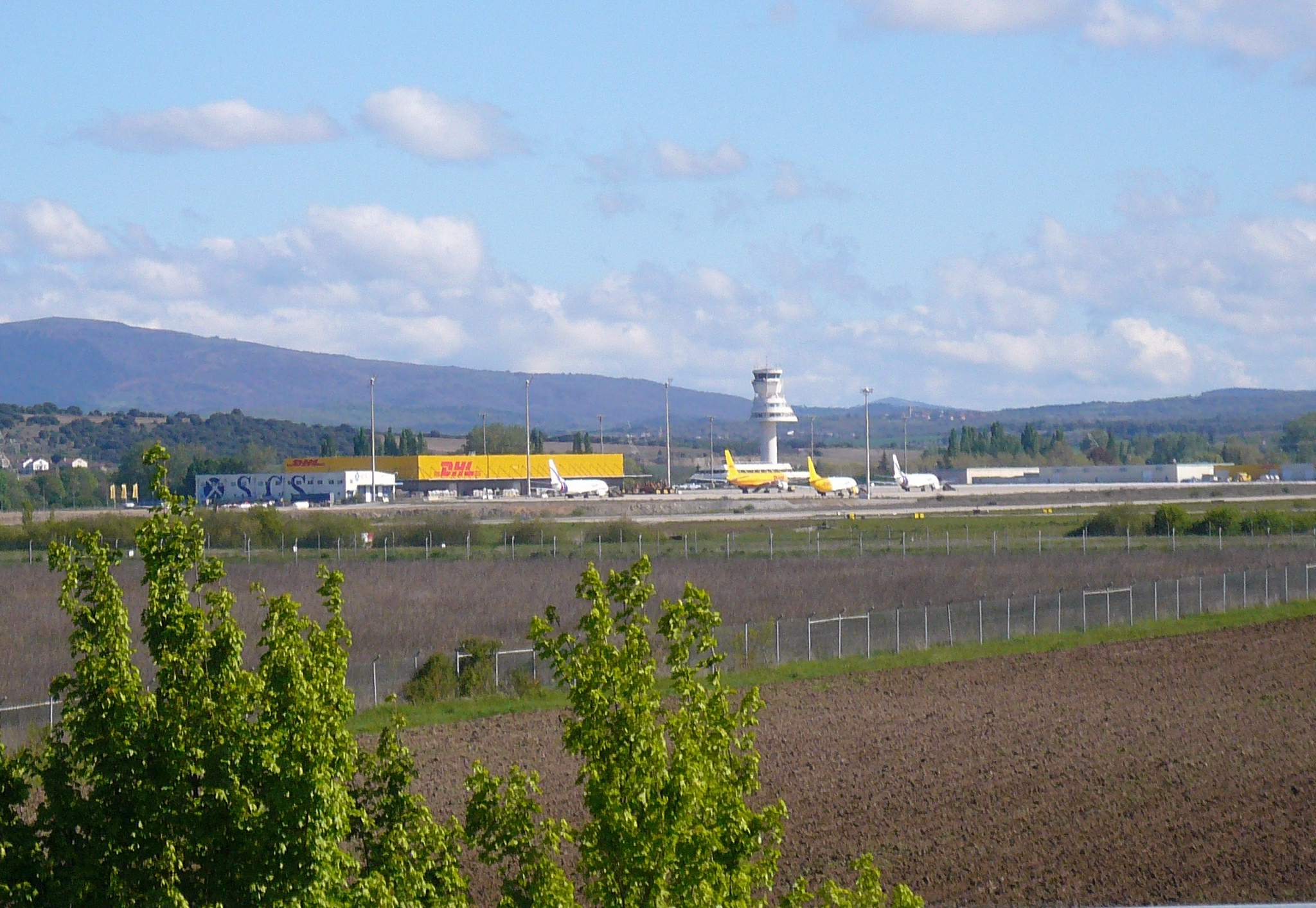
- IATA: VIT; ICAO: LEVT

Summary
- Airport type: Public
- Owner/Operator: AENA
- Serves: Vitoria-Gasteiz
- Location: Vitoria-Gasteiz, Spain
- Elevation AMSL: 1,682 ft (513 m)
- Coordinates: 42°52′58″N 02°43′28″W
- Website: www.aena.es/en/vitoria.html

Map
- Location within Spain

Runways
Direction	Length		Surface
Direction	ft	m	Surface
04/22	11,483	3,500	Concrete

Statistics (2024)
- Passengers: 263,869 ▼14.9%
- Movements: 13,857 ▼2.3%
- Cargo (metric tons): 70,500 ▼1.7%
- Source: Aena

Vitoria Airport (IATA: VIT, ICAO: LEVT) is an airport near Vitoria-Gasteiz, in the Basque Country of Spain. It is locally known as Foronda Airport due to its proximity to the hamlet of Foronda. The airport has one terminal with 3 gates, 7 check-in counters and 16 stands for medium and light aircraft, and a 3.5 km long CAT II/III runway.

== History ==
=== Foundation and early years ===
Before the current airport was built, Vitoria-Gasteiz was served by an airfield in Salburua. In 1970, due to the demographic growth of the city, the local chamber of commerce urged the provincial government of Álava to study the establishment of regular passenger flights. Due to the inadequacy of the existing infrastructure, preliminary studies for a new airport began in 1972. The 1976 project called for a 2,200 m (7,200 ft) runway, but eventually a 3,500 m (11,500 ft) runway was built. The construction, which started in 1977, required the demolition of Otaza, a hamlet which would have been too close to the runway threshold. The airport opened on 16 February 1980.

The provincial government, which had funded the construction, had envisioned the airport as the main gateway to the Basque Country. However, the initial offer of regular flights soon declined due to nearby Bilbao Airport being located closer to the main population centers. DHL opened a logistics center at the airport in 1995.

=== Development since 2000 ===
A new cargo terminal was inaugurated in 2006.

In 2006 Ryanair began daily flights from London Stansted Airport, a year later it started operating flights from Dublin Airport. The airline left the airport in October 2007. Air Nostrum terminated its two daily flights to Madrid in March 2011, leaving the airport without regular flights. Helitt operated flights to Barcelona from October 2012 to January 2013, but no other airline operated regular flights to Vitoria until 2017. During this time, scheduled passenger flights were limited to charter operations during the summer season. During the summer of 2015, Air Nostrum offered flights to Palma de Mallorca, Mahón and Jerez.

However, in 2016, Ryanair announced its return to Vitoria in March 2017 with year-round services to Bergamo and Tenerife. In October 2017, twice-weekly flights to Cologne/Bonn and Seville were added, with the aim of reaching 115,000 passengers per year. Flights to Mallorca were added in April 2019, at the same time Ryanair announced plans to expand their service to the airport by 40%, with the goal of reaching 160,000 passengers. In October 2020, Ryanair decided to reinforce domestic routes by adding a twice-weekly connection to Alicante. Ryanair's commercial contract was renovated in 2020, and a new route to Charleroi was added in April 2021. Binter Canarias started operating flights to Gran Canaria and Tenerife in July 2020. Binter's route to Tenerife was terminated in March 2022, while the remaining one to Gran Canaria ended in October 2023. In July 2025 it was announced that starting in late 2025 Volotea would fly to Madrid and Barcelona.

As of 2023, Vitoria was the fourth airport in Spain by cargo traffic. DHL has announced plans to build a maintenance hangar for its aircraft at the airport, the facilities are to become operational by mid-2027.

== Airlines and destinations ==
=== Passenger ===
The following airlines operate regular scheduled and charter flights at Vitoria Airport:

Airlines	Destinations
Binter Canarias	Seasonal: Gran Canaria
Ryanair	Alicante, Bergamo, Charleroi, Seville; Seasonal: Málaga, Palma de Mallorca
Volotea	Barcelona, Madrid; Seasonal: Menorca

=== Cargo ===
Airlines	Destinations
DHL Aviation	Brussels, Leipzig/Halle, Lisbon, Milan–Malpensa

== Statistics ==
In 2019, the airport served 174,000 passengers (37% international, 63% domestic), operated 10,800 flights and processed 64,500 tons of cargo. The airport served 235,000 passengers in 2022 (the highest number since 1993) and processed 73,600 tons of cargo, the highest number in the airport's history.

Passengers per year

Year	passengers	±%
1980	212,080	—
1981	250,357	+18.0%
1982	263,050	+5.1%
1983	237,519	−9.7%
1984	125,353	−47.2%
1985	114,229	−8.9%
1986	121,112	+6.0%
1987	133,406	+10.2%

Year	passengers	±%
1988	178,621	+33.9%
1989	257,586	+44.2%
1990	290,260	+12.7%
1991	268,089	−7.6%
1992	225,825	−15.8%
1993	248,445	+10.0%
1994	187,453	−24.5%
1995	153,259	−18.2%

Year	passengers	±%
1996	143,292	−6.5%
1997	143,951	+0.5%
1998	126,921	−11.8%
1999	156,860	+23.6%
2000	124,941	−20.3%
2001	129,102	+3.3%
2002	98,962	−23.3%
2003	102,328	+3.4%

Year	passengers	±%
2004	95,094	−7.1%
2005	91,594	−3.7%
2006	173,605	+89.5%
2007	173,878	+0.2%
2008	67,818	−61.0%
2009	39,933	−41.1%
2010	42,073	+5.4%
2011	28,211	−32.9%

Year	passengers	±%
2012	24,389	−13.5%
2013	6,912	−71.7%
2014	7,073	+2.3%
2015	11,182	+58.1%
2016	36,902	+230.0%
2017	84,261	+128.3%
2018	140,945	+67.3%
2019	174,022	+23.5%

Year	passengers	±%
2020	45,359	−73.9%
2021	128,376	+183.0%
2022	235,186	+83.2%
2023	309,929	+31.8%
2024	263,869	−14.9%

Source: 1980–1999, 1999–2010, 2004–2024 (Note: The sources give slightly different figures for the year 1999, the highest of the two is shown in the table.)

Cargo per year (metric tons)

Year	cargo	±%
1980	0	—
1981	235	—
1982	632	+168.9%
1983	722	+14.2%
1984	650	−10.0%
1985	704	+8.3%
1986	641	−8.9%
1987	515	−19.7%

Year	cargo	±%
1988	981	+90.5%
1989	719	−26.7%
1990	534	−25.7%
1991	656	+22.8%
1992	929	+41.6%
1993	414	−55.4%
1994	1,481	+257.7%
1995	13,782	+830.6%

Year	cargo	±%
1996	26,722	+93.9%
1997	31,469	+17.8%
1998	42,272	+34.3%
1999	39,926	−5.5%
2000	35,610	−10.8%
2001	36,309	+2.0%
2002	42,225	+16.3%
2003	40,156	−4.9%

Year	cargo	±%
2004	43,683	+8.8%
2005	34,786	−20.4%
2006	31,576	−9.2%
2007	31,359	−0.7%
2008	34,990	+11.6%
2009	27,388	−21.7%
2010	27,961	+2.1%
2011	34,692	+24.1%

Year	cargo	±%
2012	34,648	−0.1%
2013	37,482	+8.2%
2014	42,161	+12.5%
2015	46,372	+10.0%
2016	52,136	+12.4%
2017	60,479	+16.0%
2018	62,145	+2.8%
2019	64,471	+3.7%

Year	cargo	±%
2020	64,335	−0.2%
2021	72,529	+12.7%
2022	73,620	+1.5%
2023	71,689	−2.6%
2024	70,500	−1.7%

Source: 1980–1999, 1999–2010, 2004–2024

Aircraft movements per year

Year	movements	±%
1980	3,802	—
1981	4,617	+21.4%
1982	4,400	−4.7%
1983	3,845	−12.6%
1984	2,167	−43.6%
1985	2,109	−2.7%
1986	2,038	−3.4%
1987	2,047	+0.4%

Year	movements	±%
1988	2,418	+18.1%
1989	3,190	+31.9%
1990	3,444	+8.0%
1991	3,077	−10.7%
1992	2,776	−9.8%
1993	3,184	+14.7%
1994	2,748	−13.7%
1995	4,689	+70.6%

Year	movements	±%
1996	8,784	+87.3%
1997	12,919	+47.1%
1998	12,854	−0.5%
1999	16,828	+30.9%
2000		—
2001		—
2002		—
2003		—

Year	movements	±%
2004	12,927	—
2005	11,578	−10.4%
2006	12,351	+6.7%
2007	12,266	−0.7%
2008	12,225	−0.3%
2009	9,490	−22.4%
2010	6,742	−29.0%
2011	7,582	+12.5%

Year	movements	±%
2012	6,858	−9.5%
2013	5,395	−21.3%
2014	5,590	+3.6%
2015	6,540	+17.0%
2016	6,693	+2.3%
2017	8,435	+26.0%
2018	9,755	+15.6%
2019	10,798	+10.7%

Year	movements	±%
2020	10,317	−4.5%
2021	12,681	+22.9%
2022	13,347	+5.3%
2023	14,157	+6.1%
2024	13,857	−2.1%

Source: 1980–1999, 2004–2024

== Public transport ==
- The airport is served by the Vitoria-Gasteiz–Bilbao–Bilbao Airport bus line, operated by La Unión. The stop at the airport is on request only. Previously, the airport was served by a bus line which connected the airport with the city. The line operated only when regular flights arrived or departed.

== Accidents and incidents ==
- On 19 May 1995, a Convair CV-580 operated by Swiftair made a wheels-up landing during a training flight. All four occupants survived, but the aircraft was damaged beyond repair.
