= List of airlines of the Canary Islands =

This is a list of airlines of the Canary Islands, both defunct and active.

== Active ==
Airline	image	IATA	ICAO	Callsign	Year founded	notes
Binter Canarias		NT	IBB	BINTER	1988	flag carrier
Canarias Airlines		NT	CSR	CANAIR	2011	operates for Binter
Canaryfly		PF	CNF	CANARY	2008	
Naysa Servicios Aéreos		ZN	NAY	NAYASA	2022	

== Defunct ==
Airline	image	IATA	ICAO	CALLSIGN	Year founded	Ceased operations	notes
Canarias Air Cargo					1995	2000	
Canarias Cargo			EFA		1999	2000	
Canarias Regional Air		FW	CNM	-	1988	2000	
Islas Airways		IF	ISW	PINTADERA	2002	2012	
Navegación y Servicios Aéreos Canarios		ZN	NAY	NAYASA	1969	2018	
