= List of ATR 72 operators =

Operators using specific airliner

The ATR 72 is a twin-engine turboprop, short-haul regional airliner developed and produced in France and Italy by aircraft manufacturer ATR (Aerei da Trasporto Regionale or Avions de transport régional), a joint venture formed by French aerospace company Aérospatiale (now Airbus) and Italian aviation conglomerate Aeritalia (now Leonardo S.p.A.). The number "72" in its name is derived from the aircraft's standard seating configuration in a passenger-carrying configuration, which could seat 72–78 passengers in a single-class arrangement.

== Airline operators ==
As of November 2025, 775 ATR 72s were in airline service, with a further 171 on order.

Operators	72-200	72-200F	72-210	72-210F	72-500	72-500F	72-600	72-600F	Total
(Gabon) AfriJet							1		1
(Algeria) Air Algerie					12		3		15
(Denmark) Air Alsie					2				2
(Bangladesh) Air Astra							4		4
Air Botswana							2		2
(Egypt) Air Cairo							4		4
(France) Air Calédonie							4		4
Air Cambodia					2		1		3
(France) Air Caraïbes							3		3
(Dominican Republic) Air Century		1							1
(New Zealand) Air Chathams					2				2
(Romania) Air Connect							2		2
(France) Air Corsica							7		7
(Myanmar) Air KBZ							4		4
Air Madagascar					2		2		4
Air Mauritius					2		2		4
(French Polynesia) Air Moana							1		1
Air New Zealand							31		31
(Spain) Air Nostrum							6		6
Air Senegal							2		2
Air Serbia							10		10
(French Polynesia) Air Tahiti							7		7
(Myanmar) Air Thanlwin			2		2				4
Air Vanuatu							1		1
(Malaysia) AirBorneo					8				8
(Israel) airHaifa							6		6
(Philippines) AirSWIFT							2		2
Alliance Air (India)							18		18
(Saudi Arabia) Alpha Star Aviation							2		2
(Philippines) Alphaland Aviation					2				2
(Slovenia) Amelia International				1			1		2
(Republic of Ireland) ASL Airlines Ireland	2					2		7	11
(United Kingdom) ASL Airlines UK		1							1
(Guernsey) Aurigny							5		5
(Brazil) Azul Brazilian Airlines							39		39
(The Bahamas) Bahamasair							2		2
(Thailand) Bangkok Airways							13		13
Batik Air Malaysia							12		12
(Angola) Bestfly							2		2
(Sweden) Braathens Regional Airlines							17		17
(Nepal) Buddha Air					16				16
(Canada) Calm Air	6				3				9
(Canada) Canadian North						2			2
(Spain) Canarias Airlines							14		14
(Spain) Canaryfly					4				4
(Trinidad and Tobago) Caribbean Airlines							10		10
(Philippines) Cebgo					2		14		16
(Equatorial Guinea) CEIBA Intercontinental					2				2
(France) Chalair Aviation					1				1
(Indonesia) Citilink							7		7
(Democratic Republic of the Congo) Compagnie Africaine d'Aviation					2				2
(Denmark) Danish Air Transport	4				2		2		8
(Colombia) EasyFly							6		6
(Republic of Ireland) Emerald Airlines							14		14
(United Kingdom) Emerald Airlines UK							2		2
(United States) Empire Airlines				7				2	9
(Mayotte) Ewa Air							2		2
(United States) Fedex Express		19						10	29
Fiji Link							5		5
(Malaysia) Firefly					12				12
(Hungary) Fleet Air International		4							4
(Tanzania) Flightlink					1				1
(India) FlyBig					1		2		3
(Maldives) Flyme (Villa Air)					2		1		3
Global Aviation Mauritania					1				1
(Nigeria) Green Africa Airways							3		3
HEVILIFT Australia					4				4
(Mongolia) Hunnu Air					2				2
(Brazil) Imetame							1		1
(India) IndiGo							48		48
Iran Air							13		13
(Turks and Caicos Islands) InterCaribbean Airways					1				1
Japan Air Commuter							2		2
(Lithuania) Jump Air					1				1
(Russia) KrasAvia					2				2
(Laos) Lao Airlines					4		3		7
(Scotland) Loganair						4	10		14
(Maldives) Maldivian							2		2
(Taiwan) Mandarin Airlines							9		9
(Myanmar) Mann Yadanarpon Airlines							3		3
(Maldives) Manta Air							3		3
(Malta) Mel Air							5		5
(Canada) Morningstar Air Express		4							4
Myanmar National Airlines							8		8
Myanmar Airways International							1		1
(Spain) Naysa Servicios Aéreos							12		12
(Finland) Nordic Regional Airlines Oy					12				12
(Canada) North Star Air					4				4
(Bangladesh) Novoair					5				5
(Greece) Olympic Air							13		13
(Nigeria) Overland Airways	1								1
Pakistan International Airlines					4				4
(Indonesia) Pelita Air					3				3
(Papua New Guinea) PNG Air							7		7
(Italy) Poste Air Cargo					2				2
(Tanzania) Precision Air					5				5
(Latvia) RAF-Avia		1				1			2
(Canada) Rise Air							1		1
(Morocco) Royal Air Maroc							6		6
(Colombia) SATENA							1		1
(Uzbekistan) Silk Avia							5		5
Sky Express (Greece)					2		6		8
(South Africa) Solenta Aviation					2		3		5
(Ivory Coast) Solenta Aviation Côte d'Ivoire									0
Solenta Aviation Gabon				2					2
(Pakistan) South Air					2				2
(Poland) Sprintair		5		1		4			10
(Canada) Summit Air	1	2	1						4
(South Korea) SUM Air							1		1
(Philippines) Sunlight Air					3				3
(Haiti) Sunrise Airways					1				1
(Spain) Swiftair	3	4			8	1		4	20
(Syria) Syrian Air					2				2
(Portugal) TAP Express							8		8
(Romania) TAROM					2		4		6
(Japan) Toki Air							2		2
(Guatemala) Transportes Aéreos Guatemaltecos					4				4
(Indonesia) Travira Air							2		2
(Indonesia) Trigana Air					2				2
(Madagascar) Tsaradia					2		2		4
(Tunisia) Tunisair Express					2		2		4
(Spain) Uep! Fly	1				1				2
(Taiwan) Uni Air							14		14
(Bangladesh) US-Bangla Airlines							9		9
(Russia) UTair Aviation					15				15
Vietnam Air Services Company					6				6
(Canada) Wasaya Airways			2						2
(United Kingdom) West Atlantic UK		2							2
(Ukraine) Windrose Airlines							6		6
(Indonesia) Wings Air (Lion Group)					20		47		67
(Nepal) Yeti Airlines					7				7
(Switzerland) Zimex Aviation	1	7			1				9
Total	19	50	5	11	212	14	557	23	891
