= Navegación y Servicios Aéreos Canarios =

Airline in Spain

| IATA | ICAO | Call sign |
|---|---|---|
| ZN | NAY | NAYSA |
- Founded: 1969
- Ceased operations: 2018 (merged into Binter Canarias)
- Hubs: Gran Canaria Airport
- Secondary hubs: Tenerife North Airport
- Fleet size: 12
- Headquarters: Las Palmas, Spain
- Website: naysa.es

Navegación y Servicios Aéreos Canarios, better known by its initialism NAYSA, was a regional airline based in Las Palmas, Gran Canaria, Spain. It operated scheduled and charter flights, as well as cargo flights, air taxis, air ambulance flights and crew transfers. Its main base was Gran Canaria International Airport.

All NAYSA aircraft were operated under a franchise agreement as Binter Canarias into which it has been merged in spring 2018.

== History ==
The airline was founded by Alfonso Carrero, it was established and started operations on 7 May 1969 at Córdoba as NAYSA (Navegación y Servicios Aéreos) and added Canarias to the title when operations in the Canary Islands were started in 1973. The fleet consisted originally of a Lear 35, four Piper Navajo Chieftain, a Piper Aztec, a Piper Cherokee and a PA-18. This company was credited by being one of the first Third Level or Commuter Airlines in Europe. It established the first regular services between the Canary Islands and the Spanish Sahara and linked Madrid Barajas with smaller airports throughout Spain. On 1975 Spain lost the Spanish Sahara and several Government subsidised contracts were lost. The company changed owners in 1977 and transferred its headquarters to Las Palmas. It is owned by Canarias de Aviación (75%) and Serair (25%) and has 28 employees as of March 2007.

In spring 2018, Binter decided to merge NAYSA into its own operations and therefore handed back NAYSA's air operator certificate. Since then, all former NAYSA operations are part of Binter's.

A new company under the name of NAYSA Servicios Aéreos was formed in 2022 and began operations in June 2023.

== Destinations ==
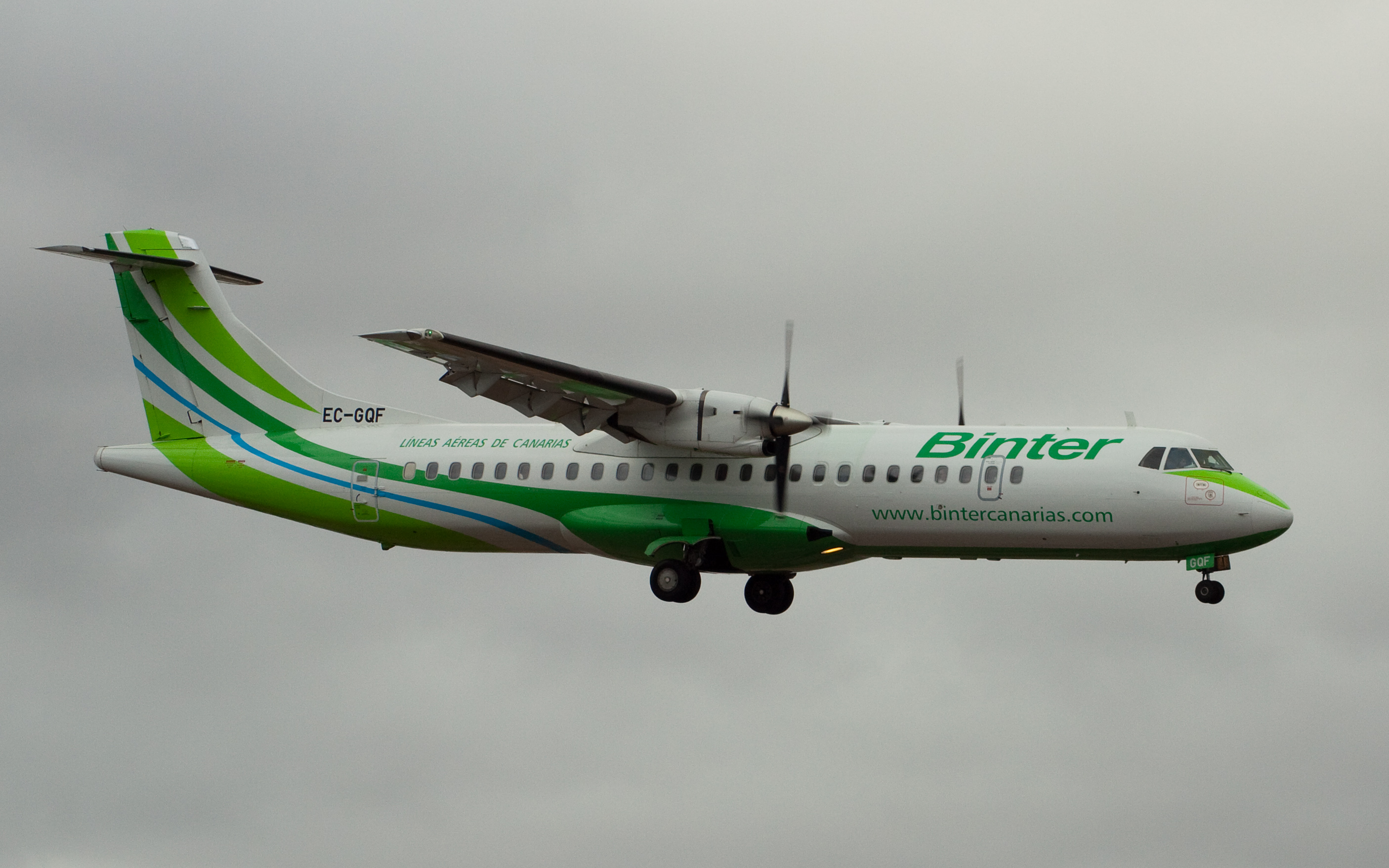
NAYSA ATR 72-212 in Binter Canarias livery

NAYSA operated the following services as of July 2010:

Portugal

- Madeira - Madeira Airport

Spain

- El Hierro - El Hierro Airport
- Fuerteventura - Fuerteventura Airport
- Gran Canaria - Gran Canaria Airport Hub
- La Gomera - La Gomera Airport
- La Palma - La Palma Airport
- Lanzarote - Lanzarote Airport
- Mallorca - Palma de Mallorca Airport
- Tenerife
  - Tenerife North Airport Hub
  - Tenerife South Airport

== Fleet ==
As of August 2025, Naysa operates the following aircraft:

Naysa fleet
| Aircraft | In service | Orders | Notes |
|---|---|---|---|
| ATR 72-600 | 12 | — | Operated for Binter Canarias |
| Total | 12 | — | |
