= Naysa Servicios Aéreos =

Spanish regional airline

Naysa Servicios Aéreos S.L. (Naysa)
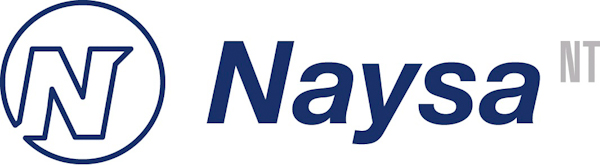
IATA	ICAO	Call sign
ZN	NAY	NAYSA
- Commenced operations: 29 June 2023; 22 months ago
- AOC #: ES.AOC.162
- Operating bases: Las Palmas Airport, Tenerife North–Ciudad de La Laguna Airport
- Frequent-flyer program: BinterMás
- Fleet size: 8
- Parent company: Binter Canarias

Naysa Servicios Aéreos S.L., styled as Naysa, is a Spanish regional airline with bases at Las Palmas Airport and Tenerife-North Airport. It commenced operations as a subsidiary of Binter Canarias in June 2023 using the name of a former airline which ceased operations in 2017.

== History ==
The former Naysa (Navegación y Servicios Aéreos Canarios S.A.) was founded in 1969 by Alfonso Carrero as an air-taxi based in Córdoba, adding a reference to the Canary Islands in 1973 when it began operations there, prior to moving its head offices to Gran Canaria in 1977. In 2007, Naysa was acquired by Binter Canarias which operated it as a subsidiary until 2017 when its operations were merged into those of the parent company.

A new company using the Naysa name was established as a subsidiary of Binter Canarias in 2022 and began operations on the 29th of June 2023, operating flight NT 222 from Las Palmas to Fuerteventura on behalf of Binter. Naysa was granted an Air Operator's Certificate in Spain with the number ES.AOC.162 in mid June 2023.

All Naysa flights are conducted on behalf of Binter Canarias, operating on that airline's route network and with its flight numbers. This is an identical arrangement to that used by existing subsidiary Canarias Airlines.

== Fleet ==
As of December 2023, the Naysa fleet consists exclusively of the ATR 72-600 airliner.

Naysa fleet
Aircraft	Total	Orders	Passengers	Notes
ATR 72-600	8	—	70	Operated on behalf of Binter Canarias.
