= SUM Air =

South Korean regional airline

IATA	ICAO	Call sign
XU	XUM	AWESUMAIR
- Founded: 17 November 2022
- Commenced operations: 30 March 2026
- Fleet size: 1
- Parent company: Mobility As A Freedom
- Headquarters: Gangseo District, Seoul, South Korea
- Key people: Yongduck Choi
- Employees: 11-50
- Website: https://www.sumair.kr/en

SUM Air (Korean: 섬에어; RR: Seomeeo) is a South Korean regional airline based in Gangseo District, Seoul, South Korea.

In February 2025 the airline received an air carrier licence from Ministry of Land, Infrastructure and Transport. The airline will operate ATR 72-600s one leased from Avation. As of January 2026, the airline has taken delivery of its first ATR 72, registered HL5264. It will operate two more ATRs.

== Destinations ==
SUM Air currently operates services to and from China and Japan.

Country	City	Airport	Notes	Refs
China	Qingdao	Qingdao Jiaodong International Airport	Planned	
China	Weihai	Weihai Dashuipo International Airport	Planned	
China	Yantai	Yantai Penglai International Airport	Planned	
Japan	Kitakyushu	Kitakyushu Airport	Planned	
Japan	Kumamoto	Kumamoto Airport	Planned	
Japan	Miyazaki	Miyazaki Airport	Planned	
Japan	Tsushima	Tsushima Airport	Planned	
South Korea	Busan	Gimhae International Airport		
South Korea	Daegu	Daegu International Airport		
South Korea	Gunsan	Gunsan Airport		
South Korea	Gwangju	Gwangju Airport		
South Korea	Jeju	Jeju International Airport		
South Korea	Muan	Muan International Airport		
South Korea	Pohang	Pohang Gyeongju Airport		
South Korea	Sacheon	Sacheon Airport		
South Korea	Seoul	Gimpo International Airport	Hub	
South Korea	Seoul	Incheon International Airport	Hub	
South Korea	Ulsan	Ulsan Airport		
South Korea	Yangyang	Yangyang International Airport		
South Korea	Yeosu	Yeosu Airport		

== Fleet ==
As of July 2026, SUM Air operates the following aircraft:

Aircraft	In service	Orders	Passengers	Notes
ATR 72-600	1	6	72	Deliveries from December 2025. Order with 4 purchase rights.
Total	1	6		

== Branding identity ==
The SUM Air logo features a triangular symbol representing an island and the sea horizon. The surrounding outline symbolizes movement and connections between destinations. The name “SUM” is derived from the Korean word for “island”.

== See also ==
- List of ATR 72 operators
- List of airlines of South Korea
