= Bob McNicol =

Scottish footballer (1933–1980)

Personal information
- Full name: Robert Hugh McNicol (Note: Some recent database sources, including Hugman's Football League Player Records and related sources such as Neil Brown's site and the ENFA website, spell the surname McNichol. However, contemporary sources including the match programme for the 1953 Scottish Junior Cup Final, the Glasgow Herald's match report, and multiple newspaper reports of the player's career, have McNicol without an "h", as do other recent sources such as Carder and Harris's Albion A–Z. That spelling is supported by primary sources, including death and probate records.)
- Date of birth: 13 February 1933
- Place of birth: Cumbernauld, Scotland
- Date of death: 25 April 1980 (aged 47)
- Place of death: Tenerife, Spain
- Height: 5 ft 11 in (1.80 m)
- Position: Full back

Youth career
- Vale of Leven Academy FP

Senior career*
Years	Team	Apps	(Gls)
- Vale of Leven
1953–1956	Stirling Albion	56	(1)
1956–1959	Accrington Stanley	134	(5)
1959–1962	Brighton & Hove Albion	93	(0)
1962–1963	Gravesend & Northfleet		
1963–1964	Carlisle United	1	(0)
1964–19??	Stalybridge Celtic		
- * Club domestic league appearances and goals

Robert Hugh McNicol (13 February 1933 – 25 April 1980) was a Scottish professional footballer who played as a full back. He made 56 Scottish League appearances for Stirling Albion and 228 in the English Football League playing for Accrington Stanley, Brighton & Hove Albion and Carlisle United.

== Life and career ==
McNicol was born in 1933 in Cumbernauld, Scotland, and attended Vale of Leven Academy. He went on to train as a carpenter and played football for his school's Former Pupils team, from where he joined junior club Vale of Leven. He was a member of their team that won the 1952–53 Scottish Junior Cup; the match programme described him as "a strong, resolute defender who has a senior future if desired". His senior future began forthwith: he joined Stirling Albion for the 1953–54 Division One season, and made 56 appearances in the top flight while completing his National Service obligations with the RAF.

After three years, McNicol moved to England to join Accrington Stanley of the Third Division North. He made 147 consecutive appearances in league and cups, a run ended when he broke a toe while playing in goal. He signed for Third Division club Brighton & Hove Albion in June 1956, but despite making 99 appearances in all competitions, he failed to settle, twice submitted transfer requests, and was eventually allowed to leave on a free transfer in July 1962. He helped Gravesend & Northfleet of the Southern League reach the fourth round of the 1962–63 FA Cup, in which they were eliminated by Sunderland only after a replay. He attempted a return to the Football League with Carlisle United, but appeared only once, and ended his football career with Stalybridge Celtic.

He became a newsagent, and later worked in the family haulage business. In 1980, McNicol and members of his family died in the Dan-Air Flight 1008 crash in Tenerife.
