= Iberia Flight 401 =

Plane crash in Tenerife

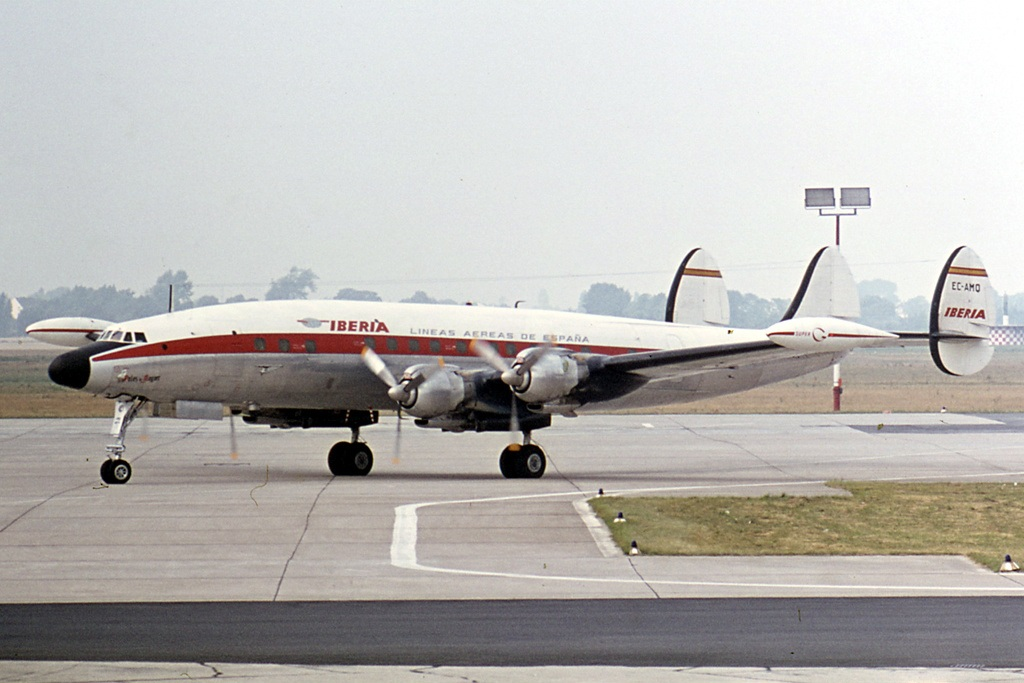
- An Iberia Lockheed Super Constellation, similar to the aircraft involved in the incident

Accident
- Date: May 5, 1965
- Summary: Poor visual on runway
- Site: Los Rodeos Airport, Tenerife, Canary Islands

Aircraft
- Aircraft type: Lockheed L-1049 Super Constellation
- Aircraft name: Santa Maria
- Operator: Iberia Airlines
- Call sign: IBERIA 401
- Registration: EC-AIN
- Flight origin: Madrid International Airport, Madrid
- Destination: Los Rodeos Airport, Tenerife
- Passengers: 40
- Crew: 9
- Fatalities: 30
- Survivors: 19

Iberia Flight 401 was a routine domestic flight from Madrid International Airport in Spain to Los Rodeos Airport in Tenerife.

== History ==
The aircraft had first entered service with Iberia new in 1954 and was named "Santa Maria". There was heavy fog at around 21:17 (9:17 p.m.) local time. As the plane came in on final approach, fog started to settle in and blocked view of the runway, and the approach controller informed the crew that visibility was below minimal. The pilot made a very low run and initiated a go-around and made another approach to land. He got a view of the beginning of the runway, but not the rest of the runway and decided to go around at about 1,000 feet (300 m). As he applied full power, the aircraft struck a scraper, a tractor and a minivan about 50 metres (160 ft) from the runway centerline. The plane was damaged and could not gain altitude, causing it to crash in the Los Rodeos gorge besides the runway.

The post-accident investigation faulted the pilot for not diverting to Las Palmas.
