= Dan-Air Flight 1008 =

1980 aviation accident

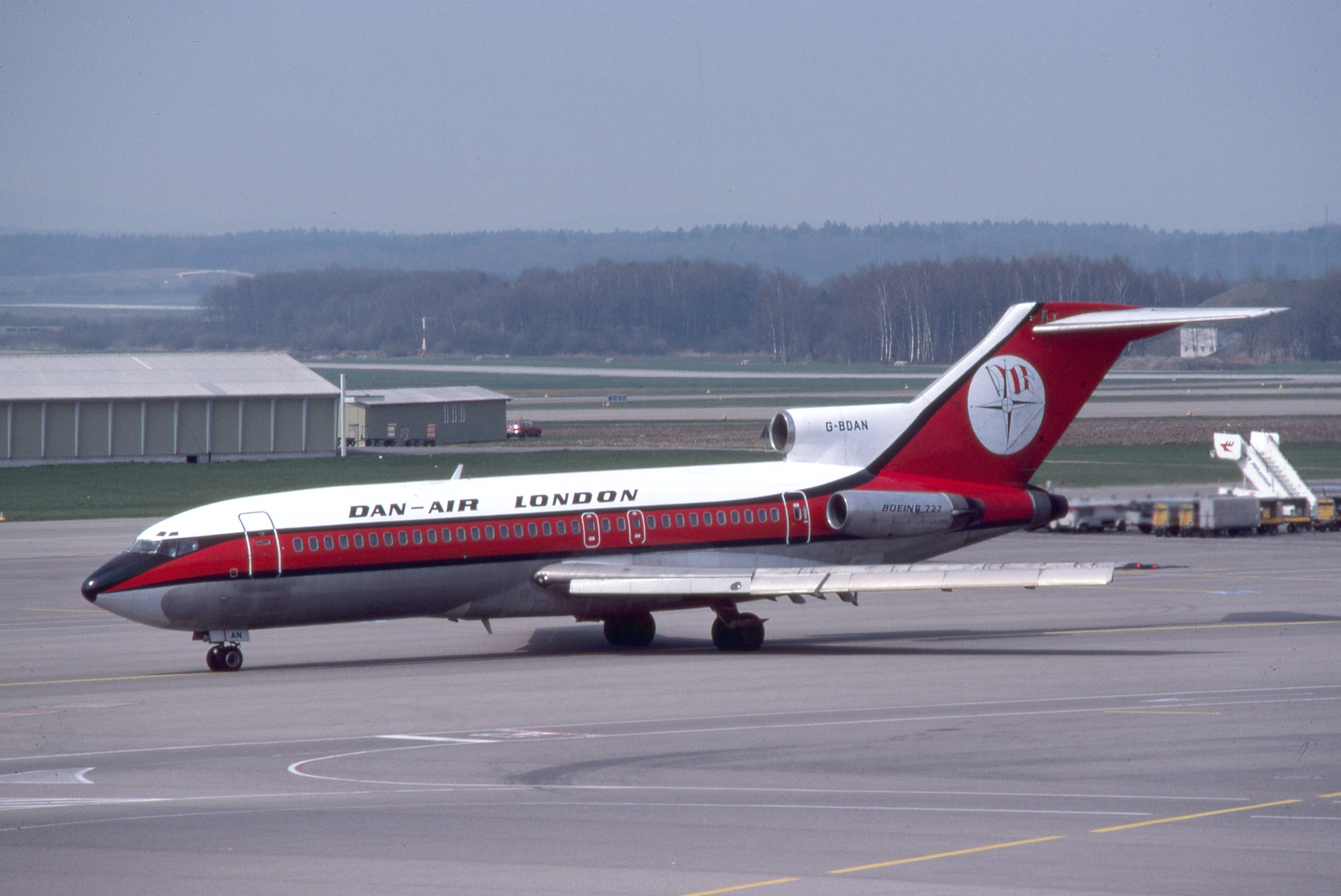
- G-BDAN, the aircraft involved in the accident

Accident
- Date: 25 April 1980
- Summary: Controlled flight into terrain due to pilot error and ATC error
- Site: Near Tenerife North Airport, Tenerife, Canary Islands, Spain; 28°23′53″N 16°25′05″W

Aircraft
- Aircraft type: Boeing 727-46
- Operator: Dan-Air Services Ltd
- IATA flight No.: DA1008
- ICAO flight No.: DAN1008
- Call sign: DAN-AIR 1008
- Registration: G-BDAN
- Flight origin: Manchester Airport, United Kingdom
- Destination: Tenerife North Airport, Tenerife, Canary Islands, Spain
- Occupants: 146
- Passengers: 138
- Crew: 8
- Fatalities: 146
- Survivors: 0

Dan-Air Flight 1008 was a fatal accident involving a Boeing 727-46 jet aircraft operated by Dan Air Services Limited on a chartered international passenger service from Manchester to Tenerife. The accident occurred on 25 April 1980 in a forest on Tenerife's Mount La Esperanza, when the aircraft's flight crew wrongly executed an unpublished holding pattern in an area of very high terrain; it resulted in the aircraft's destruction and the deaths of all 146 on board (138 passengers and eight crew). Flight 1008 was Dan-Air's second major accident in ten years and the worst accident involving the deaths of fare-paying passengers in the airline's entire history, and the seventh deadliest involving a Boeing 727.

== Background ==
=== Aircraft ===
The aircraft involved was a Boeing 727-46 that was registered as G-BDAN with serial number 19279 and line number 288, and first flew in 1966. The aircraft logged 30622 airframe hours and was powered by three Pratt & Whitney JT8D-7 engines. Dan-Air acquired the aircraft in August 1974.

=== Crew ===
In command was 50-year-old Captain Arthur John Whelan, who had flown to Tenerife North Airport 58 times previously. He had logged 15,299 flight hours, including 1,912 hours on the Boeing 727. The first officer was 33-year-old Michael John Firth, who had flown to Tenerife North Airport nine times previously. He had logged 3,492 flight hours, including 1,618 hours on the Boeing 727. The flight engineer was 33-year-old Raymond John Carey, who had never flown to Tenerife North Airport before. He had logged 3,340 hours, though his experience on the Boeing 727 is not stated in the report.

== Flight history ==
Flight 1008 was a charter flight from Manchester Airport, United Kingdom, to Tenerife North Airport, Canary Islands, Spain. The flight was flying closely behind a slower Iberia turboprop. The flight was 14 nmi (26 km; 16 mi) from VOR/DME beacon 'TFN' when it was cleared onward to radio beacon 'FP' for an approach to runway 12 after it had reached 'TFN'. Initially at flight level (FL) 110 (about 11,000 ft (3,400 m)), Dan-Air 1008 was then cleared to descend to FL 60 (about 6,000 ft (1,800 m)). The crew reported overhead 'TFN' and was requested to join a nonstandard holding pattern over the 'FP' beacon. This holding pattern was not a published procedure and the crew did not have a chart for it, but the instruction was accepted. In fact, the aircraft did not pass over 'FP', but instead flew to the south of the beacon and called "entering the hold". About a minute later, they were cleared to descend to 5,000 ft (1,500 m).

Although the pilot in command had said he was entering the hold according to the Spanish air traffic controller's instructions, he actually turned the aircraft to the left towards the southeast into an area of high ground, where the minimum safe altitude was 14,500 ft (4,400 m). During the aircraft's descent towards 5,000 ft (1,500 m) the ground proximity warning system (GPWS) activated, the crew reacted quickly and initiated a climb. With the engines at full power, the aircraft entered a steep turn to the right and struck Mount La Esperanza at 13:21:15 local time. The aircraft was flying in cloud when it struck the mountain. The impact resulted in the aircraft's complete disintegration, killing everyone on board and leaving a debris trail 350 m (1,150 ft) long.

== Accident investigation and cause ==
The official (Spanish) investigation concluded that the cause of the accident was that the pilot in command, without taking account of the altitude at which he was flying, took the aircraft into an area of high terrain and thereby failed to maintain a safe height above the terrain. A British addendum to the report found that tardy and ambiguous directions from air traffic control regarding the unpublished hold directly contributed to the disorientation of the aircraft commander. The addendum also found that the unpublished track onto which the aircraft was directed required tight turns to be flown. These were practically unflyable, making entry into the region of high ground inevitable for an aircraft flying this track, even without the navigational errors made by Dan-Air 1008. Furthermore, the addendum found that the directed altitude of 5,000 ft (1,500 m) was inadequate for this holding pattern, and that the minimum altitude for entry into the holding pattern should have been 8,000 ft (2,400 m) (with a minimum altitude of 7,000 feet (2,100 m) for the pattern itself), had a minimum safe altitude calculation been performed ahead of time by a competent authority figure. The addendum concluded that the accident would not have occurred if the aircraft had not been cleared below 7,000 ft (2,100 m).

== Memorials ==
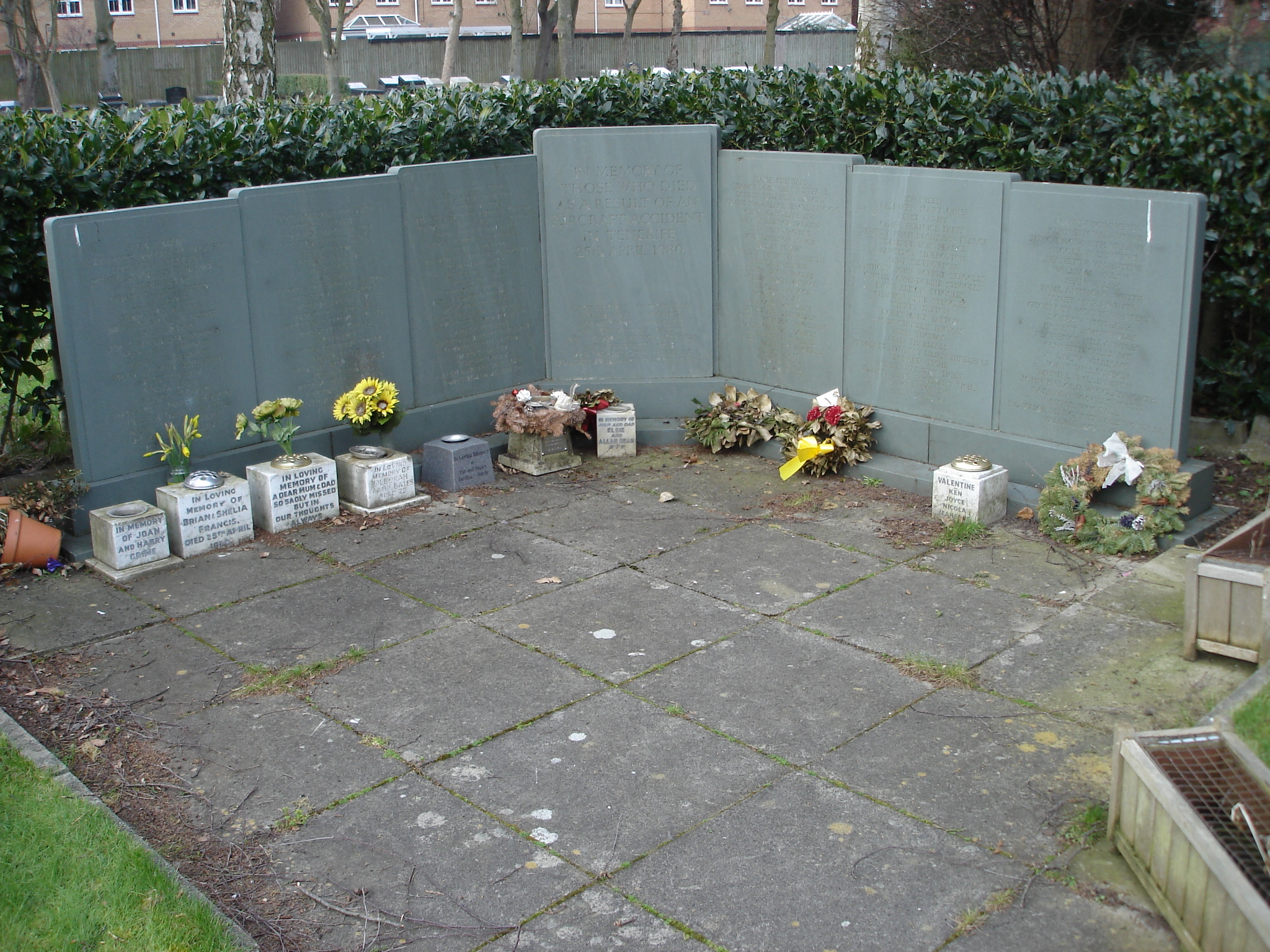
Memorial to victims of Flight 1008

A memorial in Southern Cemetery, Manchester commemorates the victims of the disaster, whose names are inscribed on a series of slate tablets within a small grassed enclosure. Also, a garden of remembrance exists aside of All Saints Church in Taoro Parque (Puerto de la Cruz, Tenerife), as passengers of the descended flight were members of the Anglican Parish there.

== Notable deaths ==
- Bob McNicol was a Scottish professional footballer who played as a full back.

== In popular culture ==
The crash of Flight 1008 was the subject of an episode of the BBC's Panorama current affairs programme that was aired in July 1981.

== See also ==
- Air China Flight 129
- Air Inter Flight 148
- Flydubai Flight 981
- Garuda Indonesia Flight 152
- Martinair Flight 138
- Thai Airways International Flight 311
- Korean Air Flight 801
- Tenerife airport disaster
