= Lanzarote Airport =

International airport in San Bartolomé, Canary Islands, Spain

César Manrique-Lanzarote Airport Aeropuerto de César Manrique-Lanzarote

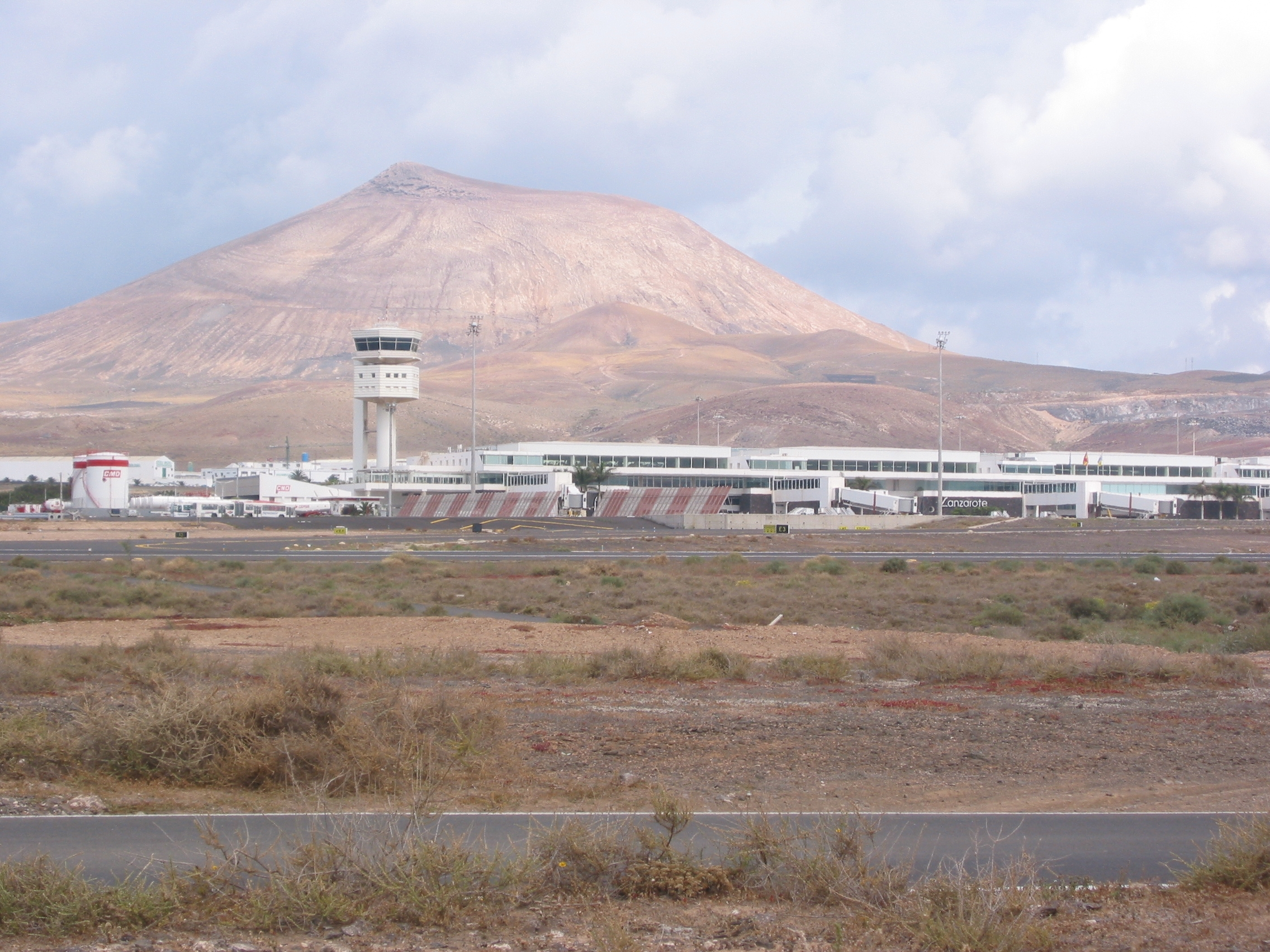
- IATA: ACE; ICAO: GCRR

Summary
- Airport type: Public
- Owner/Operator: AENA
- Serves: Lanzarote
- Location: San Bartolomé, Las Palmas
- Elevation AMSL: 14 m (46 ft)
- Coordinates: 28°56′44″N 13°36′19″W
- Website: aena.es

Map
- Location within Spain

Runways
Direction	Length		Surface
Direction	m	ft	Surface
03/21	2,400	7,874	Asphalt

Statistics (2022)
- Passengers: 7,350,451
- Passenger change 21-22: ▲113.7%
- Aircraft movements: 63,764
- Movements change 21-22: ▲64.9%
- Cargo (t): 589
- Cargo change 21-22: ▼18.2%
- Sources: Spanish AIP; AENA Passenger Traffic

César Manrique-Lanzarote Airport (IATA: ACE, ICAO: GCRR), commonly known as Lanzarote Airport and also known as Arrecife Airport, is an airport serving the island of Lanzarote in the Canary Islands. The airport is located in San Bartolomé, Las Palmas, 5 kilometres (3.1 mi) southwest of the island's capital, Arrecife. It handles flights to many European airports, with hundreds of thousands of tourists each year, as well as domestic flights to other Spanish airports. It handled 7,350,451 passengers in 2022.

== History ==
=== Early years ===
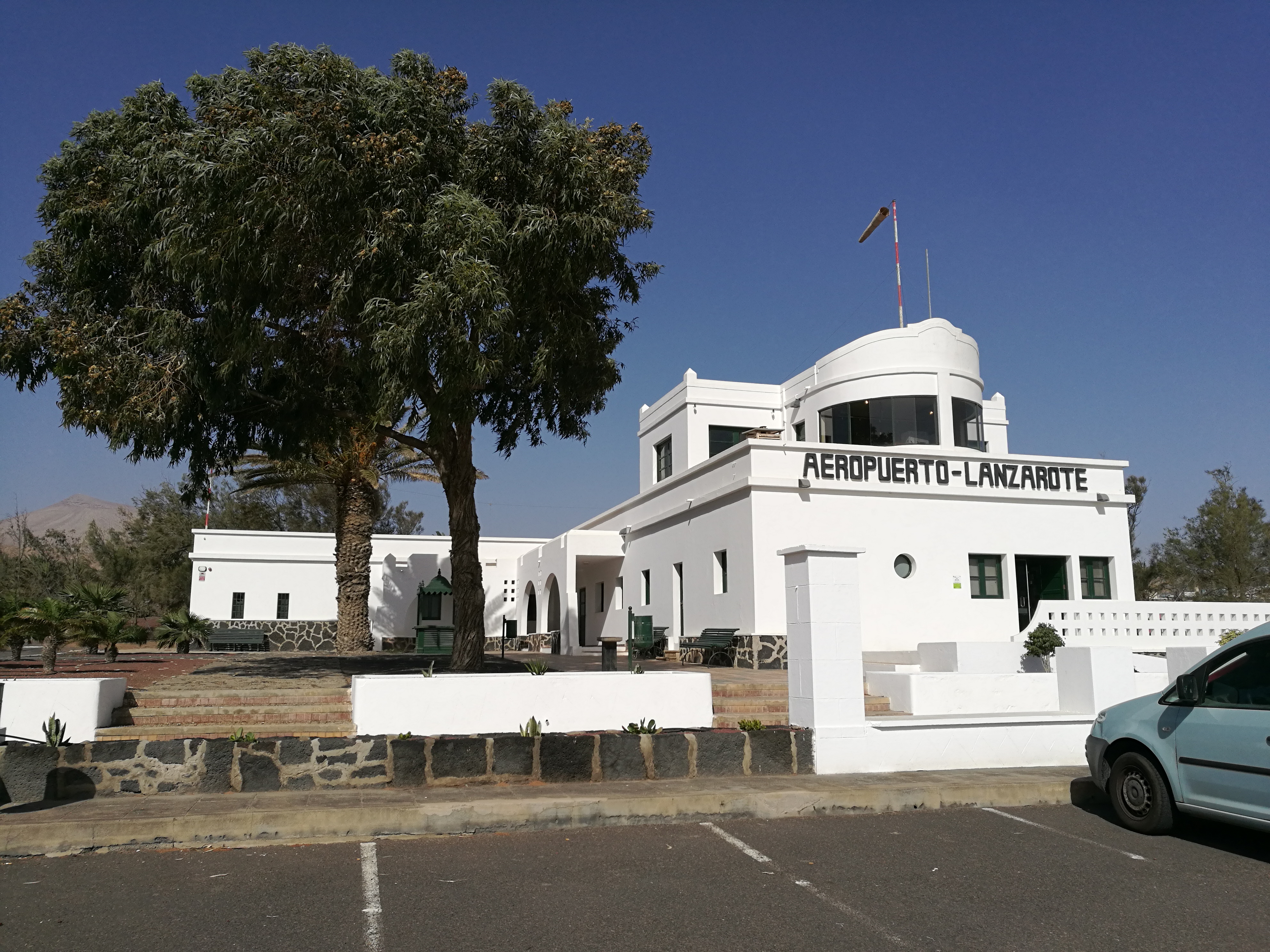
The first passenger terminal (1946-1970). Now Aeronautical Museum.

In the 1930s, a need for an aerodrome on the island became evident when connections were required with the other islands and the mainland, as well as a refuelling point for aircraft. Subsequently, an airfield was built at Llanos de Guacimeta. The first aircraft to land at the airport was a Junkers Ju 52 EC-DAM on 24 July 1941. The Spanish Air Force then saw a need for a permanent aerodrome for defence purposes, and this was constructed in Arrecife. In 1946, the airport provisionally accepted civil traffic. Improvements were carried out to the existing facilities, with a runway extension and additional ramp space provided.

A new passenger terminal was constructed along with a control centre, and on 3 March 1970 international and domestic flights began using the airport. A centrepiece of the Guacimeta terminal was the mural created by César Manrique entitled Lanzarote.

=== Development since the 1990s ===
The growing use of the airport called for the need of improved facilities. DME, ILS and VOR facilities were installed for Runway 03/21 along with additional holding points. New runway lighting and a fire station were also commissioned. In 1999, a new passenger terminal opened (Terminal 1), with a capacity of 6 million passengers per annum. Since then, the original passenger terminal has been revamped and is now used for inter-island flights (Terminal 2).

In 2002, in response to interest from both tourists and local people about the island's aviation heritage, Aena decided to use the Guacimeta passenger terminal as an aviation museum. The museum provides a comprehensive and detailed insight into the history of aviation on the island. There are a number of audio-visual presentations.

As a tribute to the legacy left behind by local artist César Manrique, the airport's official name was changed in 2019, coinciding with the centenary of the artist's birth.

== Airlines and destinations ==
The following airlines operate regular scheduled and charter flights at Lanzarote Airport:

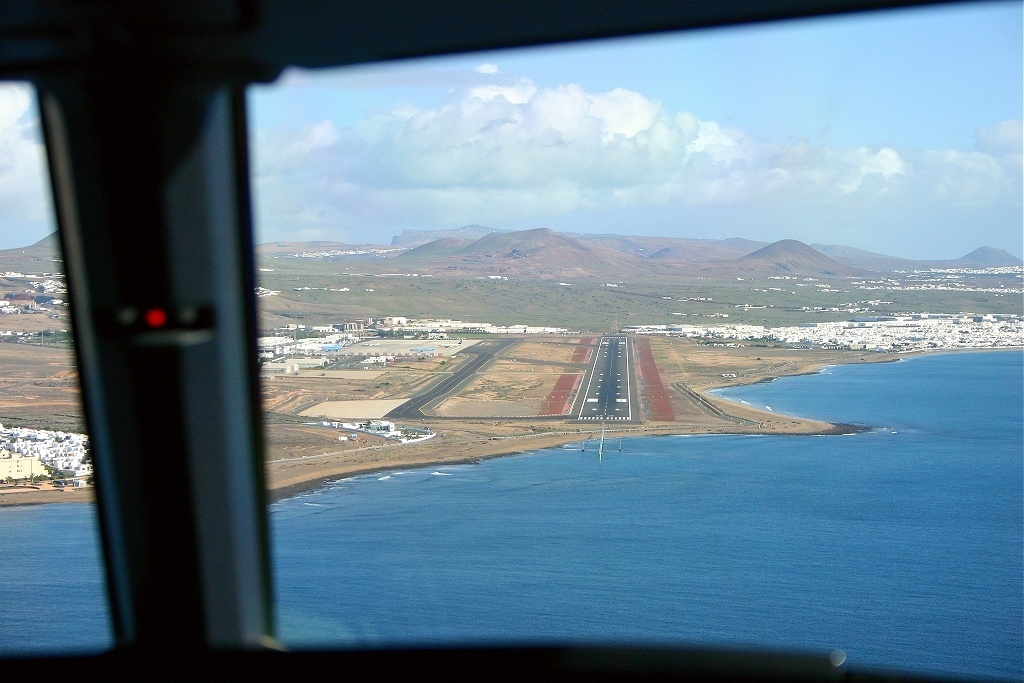
Lanzarote Airport seen from the cockpit of an aircraft on approach

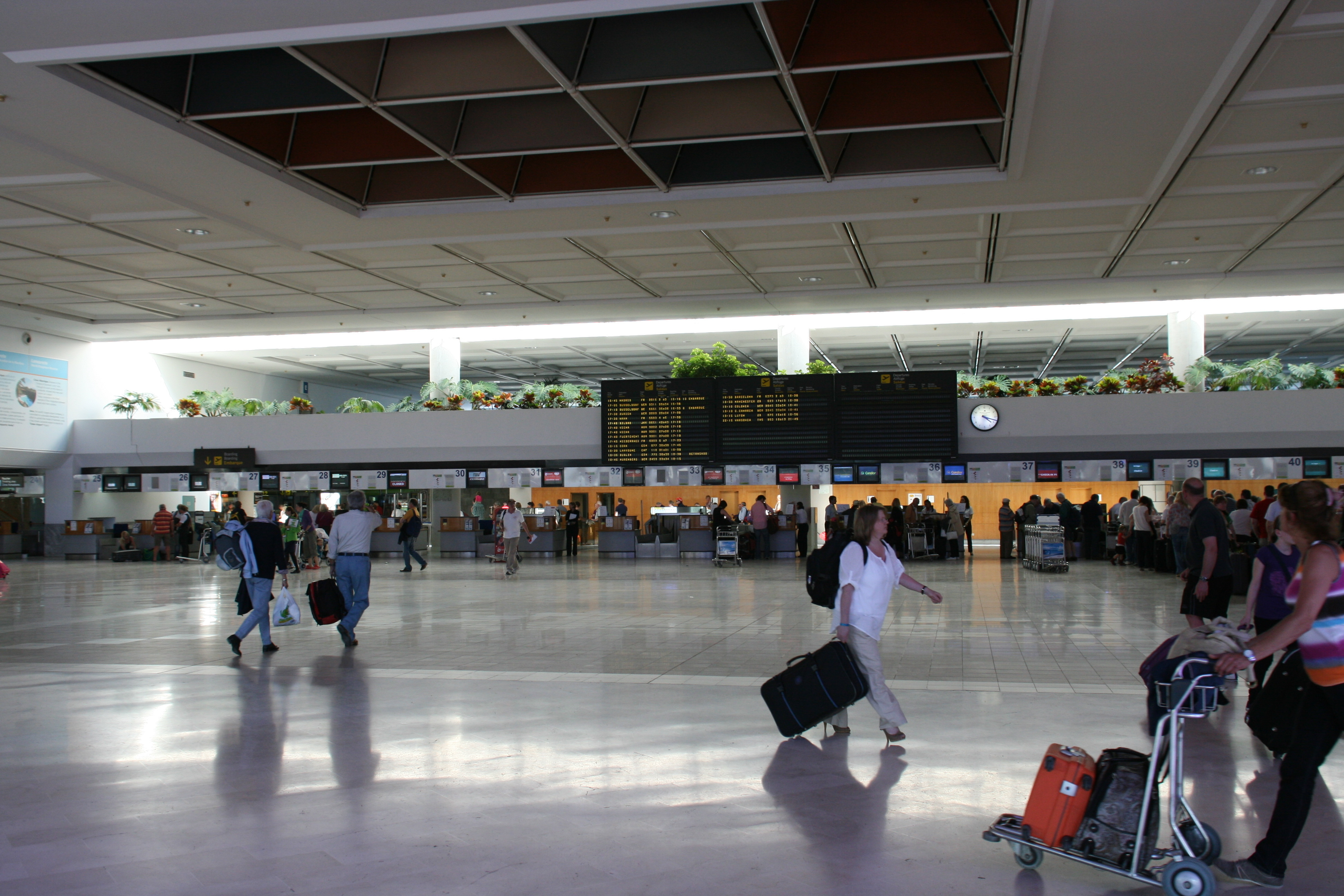
Terminal concourse

Airlines	Destinations
Aer Lingus	Dublin
Air Europa	Madrid; Seasonal: Barcelona
Air Nostrum	Seasonal charter: Porto
Binter Canarias	Gran Canaria, Guelmim, Tenerife–North; Seasonal: Funchal
British Airways	London–Gatwick
Brussels Airlines	Brussels
Canaryfly	Gran Canaria, Tenerife–North
Condor	Düsseldorf, Frankfurt, Munich
Discover Airlines	Frankfurt, Munich
easyJet	Birmingham, Bordeaux, Bristol, Edinburgh, Geneva, Liverpool, London–Gatwick, London–Luton, Lyon, Manchester, Milan–Malpensa, Nantes, Nice, Paris–Charles de Gaulle; Seasonal: Belfast–International, Glasgow, London–Southend
Edelweiss Air	Zurich
Eurowings	Seasonal: Cologne/Bonn, Düsseldorf, Prague, Stuttgart
Finnair	Seasonal: Helsinki
Iberia	Seasonal: Vigo
Iberia Express	Madrid
Jet2.com	Belfast–International, Birmingham, Bournemouth, Bristol, East Midlands, Edinburgh, Glasgow, Leeds/Bradford, Liverpool, London–Gatwick, London–Luton, London–Stansted, Manchester, Newcastle upon Tyne
Luxair	Luxembourg
Marabu	Hamburg
Neos	Seasonal: Milan–Malpensa
Norwegian Air Shuttle	Seasonal: Copenhagen, Oslo; Seasonal charter: Bergen
Ryanair	Alicante, Belfast–International, Bergamo, Birmingham, Bologna, Bournemouth, Bratislava, Bristol, Charleroi, Cologne/Bonn, Dakhla, Dublin, East Midlands, Edinburgh, Glasgow–Prestwick, Knock, Leeds/Bradford, London–Stansted, Madrid, Málaga, Manchester, Marseille, Santiago de Compostela, Seville, Shannon, Turin, Valencia, Zagreb; Seasonal: Beauvais, London–Luton, Marrakesh, Rome–Fiumicino, Venice
Scandinavian Airlines	Seasonal charter: Oslo
Smartwings	Prague; Seasonal charter: Katowice, Warsaw–Chopin
Transavia	Amsterdam, Eindhoven, Nantes, Paris–Orly
TUI Airways	Bournemouth, Bristol, Cardiff, East Midlands, Exeter, Glasgow, London–Gatwick, Manchester, Newcastle upon Tyne; Seasonal: Belfast–International
TUI fly Belgium	Brussels
TUI fly Deutschland	Düsseldorf, Frankfurt, Hannover, Munich, Stuttgart
TUI fly Netherlands	Amsterdam, Rotterdam/The Hague; Seasonal: Cork, Dublin, Shannon
TUI fly Nordic	Seasonal charter: Gothenburg, Stockholm–Arlanda
Volotea	Asturias; Seasonal: Brest, Lille, Lyon, Nantes
Vueling	Barcelona, Bilbao, Malaga, Paris–Orly, Santiago de Compostela, Seville

== Ground transportation ==
There are four bus lines connecting Lanzarote Airport with the rest of the island. The airport is connected via bus lines 22 and 23 to the city of Arrecife, and via lines 161 and 261 to Playa Blanca and Puerto del Carmen.

== Statistics ==
=== Passenger numbers ===
Year	Passengers	Aircraft movements	Cargo (tonnes)
2004	5,517,136	48,446	7,996
2005	5,467,499	47,158	6,629
2006	5,626,087	50,172	6,114
2007	5,625,580	52,968	5,785
2008	5,438,178	53,375	5,430
2009	4,701,669	42,915	4,147
2010	4,938,343	46,669	3,787
2011	5,543,744	49,675	2,873
2012	5,168,775	44,787	2,108
2013	5,334,599	44,259	2,081
2014	5,883,039	49,575	2,050
2015	6,128,971	50,448	1,805
2016	6,684,564	54,632	1,776
2017	7,388,964	59,477	1,824
2018	7,327,019	60,955	1,606
2019	7,292,720	60,524	1,346
2020	2,538,345	30,056	583
2021	3,438,219	38,740	498
2022	7,350,451	63,764	589
Source: Aena Statistics

=== Busiest routes ===
Busiest international routes from ACE (2023)
Rank	Destination	Passengers	Change 2021/22
1	Manchester	539,878	▲17%
2	Dublin	471,037	▲18%
3	London-Gatwick	456,670	▲29%
4	London-Stansted	274,965	▲4%
5	Birmingham	247,796	▲8%
6	Bristol	246,227	▲34%
7	East Midlands	227,659	▲29%
8	Edinburgh	181,460	▲20%
9	Newcastle	168,813	▲19%
10	Leeds/Bradford	166,110	▲10%
11	Glasgow	127,031	▲12%
12	Cork	121,275	▲15%
13	Amsterdam	116,328	▼16%
14	London-Luton	113,481	▲18%
15	Düsseldorf	101,342	▲6%
16	Frankfurt	90,194	▼1%
17	Belfast-International	89,138	▲12%
18	Paris-Orly	85,114	▲30%
19	Cologne/Bonn	74,094	▲59%
20	Brussels	70,400	▲11%
Source: Estadísticas de tráfico aereo

Busiest domestic routes from ACE (2023)
Rank	Destination	Passengers	Change 2021/22
1	Gran Canaria	807,811	▲9%
2	Madrid	635,946	▲10%
3	Tenerife-North	406,022	▲4%
4	Barcelona	270,619	▲19%
5	Santiago de Compostela	134,381	▲17%
6	Bilbao	133,690	▼1%
7	Seville	106,457	▲40%
8	Málaga	67,160	▲4%
9	Tenerife-South	65,049	▲76%
10	Valencia	52,847	▲1%
11	Asturias	41,624	▲11%
12	Alicante	33,355	▼24%
13	La Palma	17,028	▲31%
14	Zaragoza	9,145	▼5%
15	Vigo	2,118	▲117%
Source: Estadísticas de tráfico aereo

== See also ==
- List of airports in Spain
