= La Gomera Airport =

La Gomera Airport Aeropuerto de La Gomera

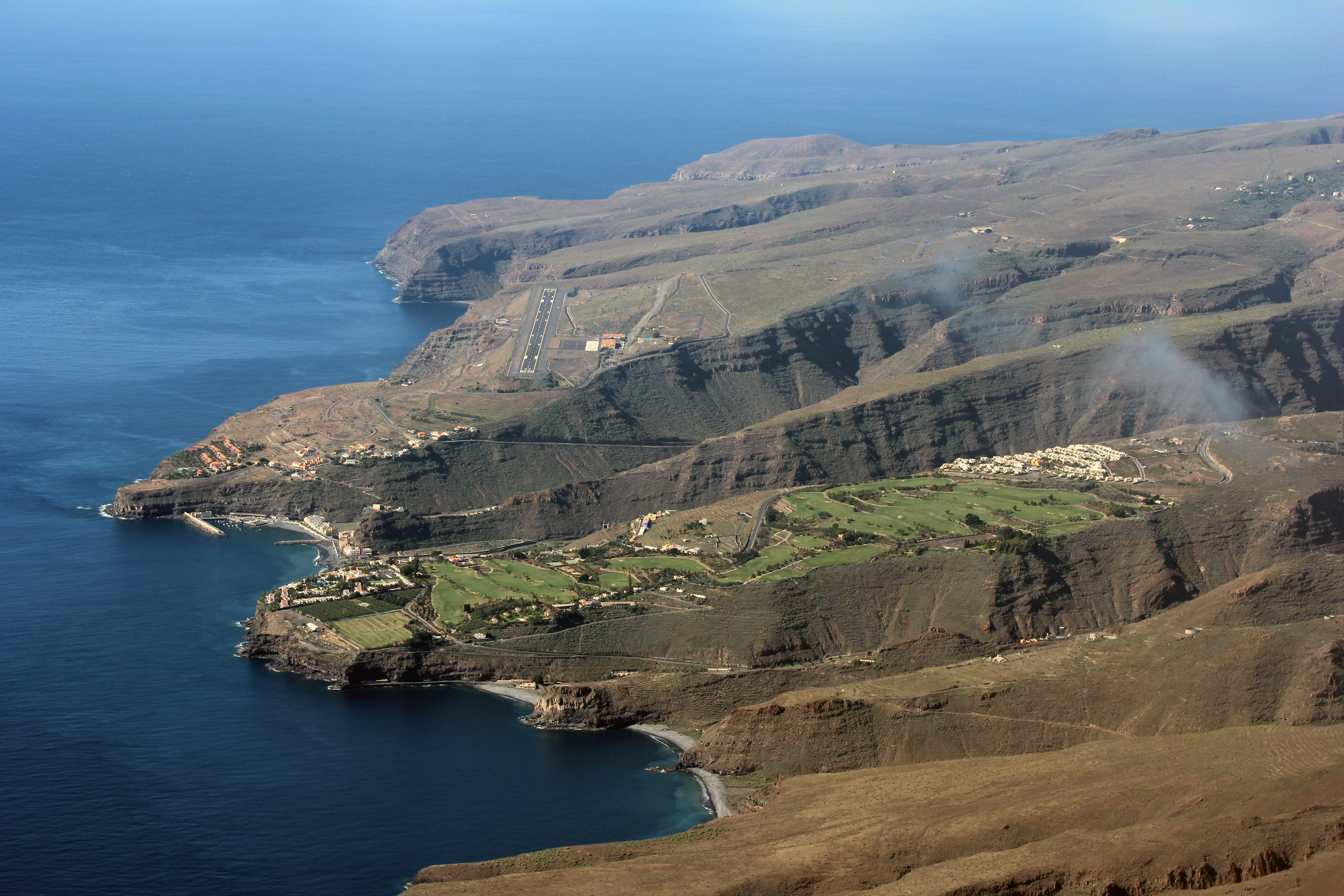
- IATA: GMZ; ICAO: GCGM

Summary
- Airport type: Public
- Owner/Operator: AENA
- Serves: La Gomera
- Location: Playa Santiago
- Elevation AMSL: 218 m (715 ft)
- Coordinates: 28°01′47″N 017°12′53″W

Map
- Location within Spain

Runways
Direction	Length		Surface
Direction	m	ft	Surface
09/27	1,500	4,921	Asphalt

Statistics (2021)
- Passengers: 81,367
- Passengers change 20-21: ▲45.7%
- Movements: 2,624
- Movements change: ▲21.5%
- Cargo (t): 1.6
- Source: Spanish AIP at EUROCONTROL, Aena

La Gomera Airport (Spanish: Aeropuerto de La Gomera; IATA: GMZ, ICAO: GCGM) is an airport located near the town of Playa Santiago on the island of La Gomera in the Canary Islands, 34 km (21 mi) southwest by road from the island's capital city, San Sebastián de la Gomera.

Although the runway was completed in 1994, the terminal did not open until 1999. As of August 2019, there are two return flights per day to Tenerife North and two return flights per day to Gran Canaria.

Although 34 km (21 mi) from the island capital, the airport was located here to avoid disturbing the Garajonay National Park and avoid the cloudier and foggier climate to the North of the island. Whilst the volcanic terrain gives few suitable sites anywhere on La Gomera, this site required extensive embankments at both ends of the runway.

== History ==
Aviation in the island of La Gomera started in the 1950s, when a private airfield was constructed. Its name was "El Revolcadero" and it was situated on a hill west of the new airport.

This airfield had a runway (09-27), a hangar and a small stand which was used as control tower. The airfield was for the owner's private use, for cargo and fumigation works.

In 1962, the island had a lot of sanitary assistance problems, so studies to build an airport in the island were started, but this project was not carried out until 1975. However, due to the opening of the Tenerife South Airport and a new maritime line with the island, the project was again delayed.

Finally, in the 1980s, problems with wounded snake-bite evacuations necessitated building an airport in the island, and on 27 July 1987, an agreement for the construction of the airport was signed.

At the end of 1994 the airfield had a runway (09-27), an aircraft parking and a taxi way to the runway. The elected place to build the installations was the "Meseta de los Acantilados" (Plateau Cliffs), which is located 2 kilometers from the old airfield of "El Revolcadero".

At the end of 1991, when Aeropuertos Españoles y Navegación Aérea (AENA), literally "Spanish Airports and Air Navigation", took over the airport, a passenger terminal was built, which was inaugurated in 1992. This passenger terminal has two floors and was built in typical canarian style.

== Airlines and destinations ==
Airlines	Destinations
Binter Canarias	Gran Canaria, Tenerife–North

== Statistics ==
In the next chart, the evolution of passengers traffic by year is indicated.

2004	2005	2006	2007	2008	2009	2010	2011	2012	2013	2014	2015	2016	2017	2018	2019	2020	2021
30,774	34,496	38,852	40,569	41,890	34,605	32,252	32,713	19,707	24,446	28,954	34,954	38,042	48,711	61,944	77,584	54,388	81,367
