= Canarias Airlines =

Spanish regional airline

Canarias Airlines Compañía de Aviación S.L.
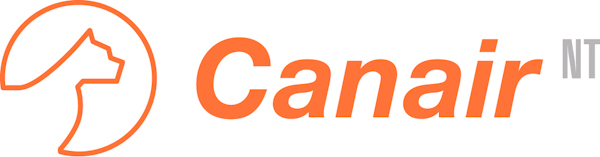
IATA	ICAO	Call sign
—	RSC	CANAIR
- AOC #: ES.AOC.114
- Operating bases: Las Palmas Airport, Tenerife North–Ciudad de La Laguna Airport, Tenerife South, La Palma Airport
- Frequent-flyer program: BinterMás
- Fleet size: 14
- Parent company: Binter Canarias

Canarias Airlines Compañía de Aviación S.L., styled as Canair, is a Spanish regional airline with bases at Las Palmas Airport and Tenerife-North Airport which commenced operations as a subsidiary of Binter Canarias in September 2011. Canair was founded in 2011 as a low-fare subsidiary of Binter Canarias, which began operations in September of that year with two ATR 72-500 airliners.

== History ==
The company was branded as “another move in the strategy of Binter Canarias in guaranteeing the provision of public services in the Canary Islands" and initially employed 22 pilots and 24 flight attendants, operating 24 daily flights between Gran Canaria and Tenerife.

In June 2023, Binter Canarias opened a second subsidiary airline, Naysa Servicios Aéreos, using the name of a former airline. This airline operates exclusively on behalf of Binter, alongside Canair.

== Fleet ==
As of August 2025, Canair operates the following aircraft:

Canair fleet
Aircraft	Total	Orders	Passengers	Notes
ATR 72-600	14	—	70	Operated for Binter Canarias.
