= Binter Canarias =

Spanish airline

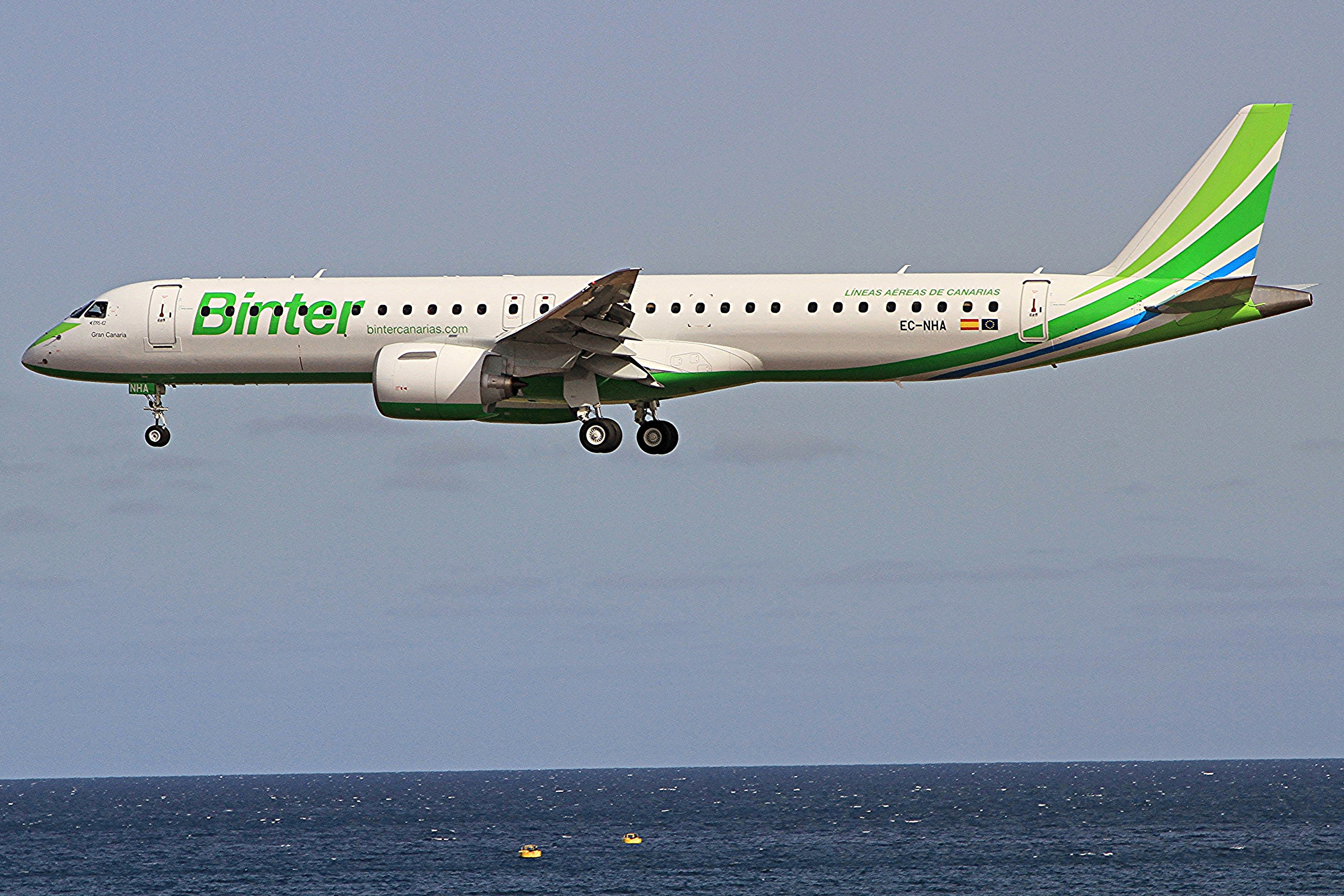
- Binter Canarias E195-E2 in standard livery
IATA	ICAO	Call sign
NT	IBB	BINTER
- Founded: 18 February 1988; 38 years ago
- Commenced operations: 26 March 1989; 37 years ago
- Hubs: Gran Canaria; Tenerife–North
- Frequent-flyer program: Bintermás
- Subsidiaries: Canarias Airlines; Naysa Servicios Aéreos
- Fleet size: 42
- Destinations: 38
- Headquarters: Telde and San Cristóbal de La Laguna, Spain
- Key people: Pedro Agustín del Castillo Machado (CEO)
- Website: bintercanarias.com

Binter Canarias S.A. is the flag carrier of the Spanish autonomous community of the Canary Islands, based on the grounds of Gran Canaria Airport in Telde, Gran Canaria and Tenerife North Airport, San Cristóbal de La Laguna, Spain. It is a regional air carrier operating inter-island services within the Canary Islands, and other Atlantic islands, it also operates to the Spanish Mainland, Portugal and some African destinations. Affiliated airlines operate on behalf of Binter in services to Morocco, mainland Spain and Portugal.

== History ==
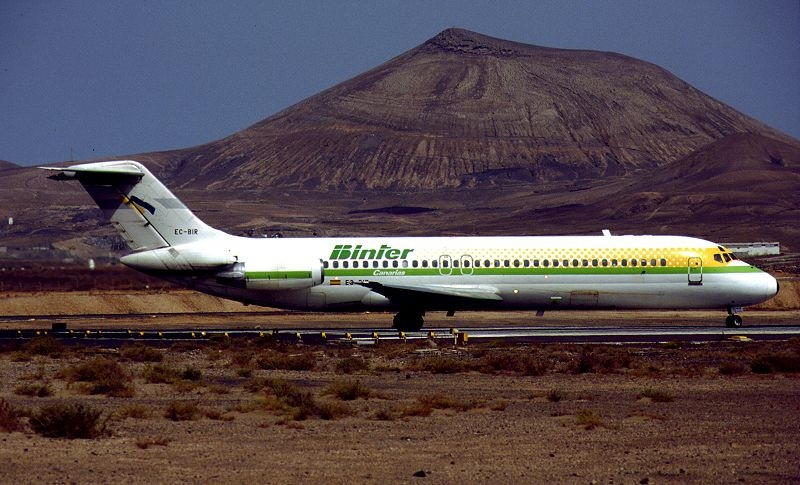
A former Binter Canarias Douglas DC-9 in 1997

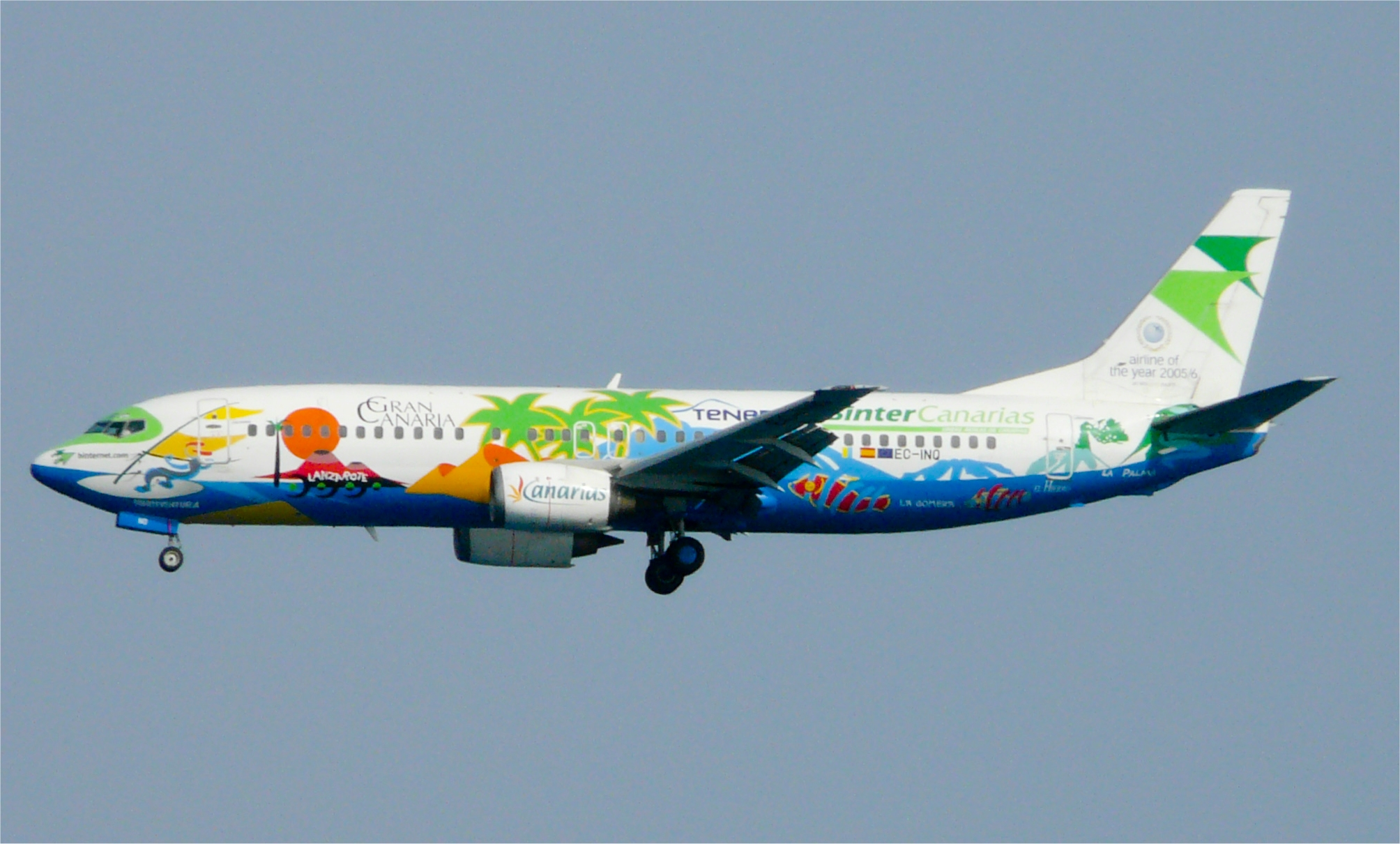
A former Binter Canarias Boeing 737-400 wearing a special livery in 2008

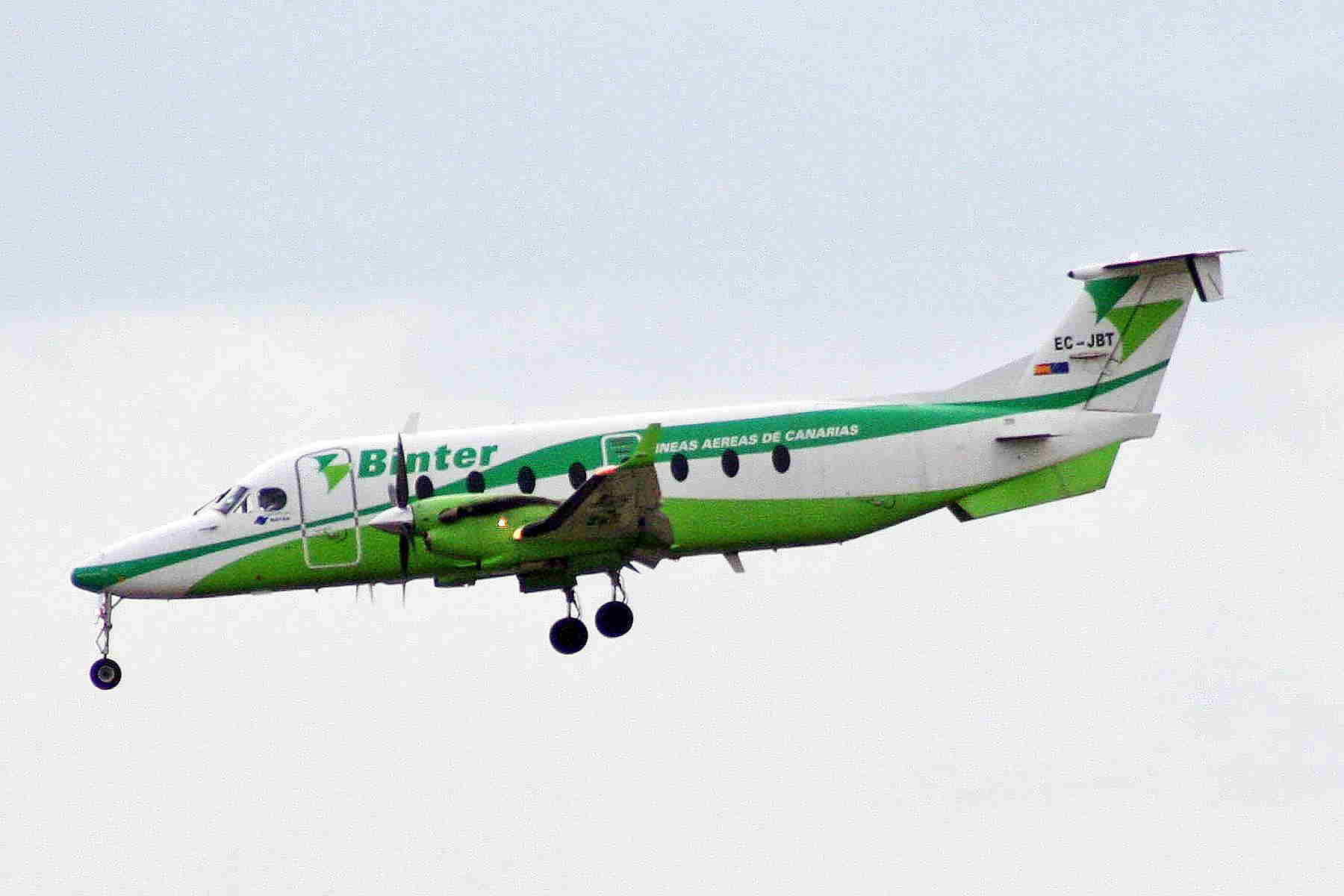
A former Binter Canarias Beechcraft 1900 in 2012

=== Foundation and early years ===
The airline was established on 18 February 1988 and started operations on 26 March 1989. It was formed as a subsidiary of Iberia. Binter Canarias began operations as a regional airline and is currently the only one to operate in the eight airports of the Canaries. Binter also operates connections with Marrakesh, Dakar, Aaiun in Africa; Madeira, and Lisbon in Portugal; Sal in Cape Verde; and Vigo and Mallorca in Spain. The airline also flies to the island of Madeira, serving the capital Funchal. Regular flights to the cities of Bergamo and Paris were trialled but later cancelled as unsuccessful projects. Nowadays has regular flights to Lisbon and Cape Verde for renting technical crew and aircraft (CRJ) to Air Nostrum. The airline also serves Africa: it operates scheduled flights to Marrakesh, Casablanca and Laayoune in Morocco, alongside charter flights to Nouadibou and Nouakchott in Mauritania.

In late 1999 SEPI (the Spanish state holding company of Iberia) implemented the privatisation of Binter Canarias, but held on to a "golden share", permitting it to authorise any future shareholding deal of more than 25%. However, the airline was wholly owned by Hesperia Inversiones Aéreas, which bought the airline in July 2002. In 2003, Binter Canarias, SAU was absorbed by Hesperia Inversiones Aéreas, SA, which took the name of Binter Canarias, SA. It is now owned by Ilsamar Tenerife (49.81%), Ferma Canarias Electrica (10.44%), Agencia Maritima Afroamericana (10.11%), Flapa (10%) and others (19.6%) and has 406 employees. Binter has sales offices, Binter Vende, at the airports, and since 2005, the ground support service has been provided by Atlántica Handling. Since January 2008, the technical service for Binter aircraft has been provided by BinterTechnic.

=== Development since 2010 ===
Some of the owners of Binter Canarias decided to buy Navegacion y Servicios Aéreos Canarios (NAYSA) and to transfer some planes from Binter to NAYSA in order to reduce costs and increase benefits. The airline also established Canarias Airlines (trading as Canair) as a low-fare subsidiary in 2011.

In 2016, the airline agreed a deal for a further six ATR 72-600 aircraft, bringing total commitments to the type to 18. They will replace ATR 72-500 aircraft. In spring 2018, Binter decided to merge Navegacion y Servicios Aéreos Canarios (NAYSA) into its own operations and therefore handed back NAYSA's air operator certificate. Since then, all former NAYSA operations are part of Binter's.

Since late 2017, Binter Cabo Verde took over inter-island flights in Cape Verde after the discontinuation of flights by TACV on 1 August 2017, as TACV was restructuring and privatising. Binter CV established a partnership covering TACV's international services, allowing TACV to offer connections to domestic destinations and seeking to strengthen inter-island connections. In 2019, Binter Cabo Verde was renamed as Transportes Interilhas de Cabo Verde (TICV), and in 2021, the Canarian company sold its 70% stake in the airline to BestFly Worldwide, thus completing its divestment.

In June 2018, it began domestic operations between Madeira and Porto Santo Islands in the northern neighboring Madeiran archipelago.

The airline's first of ten Embraer E195-E2 aircraft started passenger revenue service in December 2019 as the European launch customer.

In June 2023, Binter launched an additional subsidiary alongside Canarias Airlines. This subsidiary, Naysa Servicios Aéreos, uses the name of the former carrier which had been merged into Binter and Canarias Airlines in 2018.

Binter's original AOC - named Binter Airlines since 2015 - now exclusively operates the E195-E2 jet fleet, having disposed of its last ATR 72-500 in September 2024 after transferring its newer ATR 72-600 aircraft to Naysa. Alongside Canair and Naysa, this AOC operates under the Binter Canarias parent brand.

== Destinations ==
As of August 2024, Binter Canarias serves the following destinations:

Country (Region)	Destination	Airport	Notes	Refs
Cape Verde	Sal	Amílcar Cabral International Airport		
France	Lille	Lille Airport	Terminated	
France	Marseille	Marseille Provence Airport	Terminated	
France	Toulouse	Toulouse–Blagnac Airport	Terminated	
Gambia	Banjul	Banjul International Airport	Terminated	
Italy	Florence	Florence Airport	Terminated	
Italy	Venice	Venice Marco Polo Airport	Terminated	
Mauritania	Nouakchott	Nouakchott–Oumtounsy International Airport		
Morocco	Agadir	Agadir–Al Massira Airport		
Morocco	Fez	Fès–Saïs Airport		
Morocco	Guelmim	Guelmim Airport		
Morocco	Marrakesh	Marrakesh Menara Airport	Terminated	
Portugal (Islands)	Madeira (Funchal)	Cristiano Ronaldo International Airport		
Portugal (Islands)	Porto Santo	Porto Santo Airport		
Portugal (Islands)	Ponta Delgada	João Paulo II Airport		
Spain (Canary Islands)	El Hierro	El Hierro Airport		
Spain (Canary Islands)	Fuerteventura	Fuerteventura Airport		
Spain (Canary Islands)	Gran Canaria	Gran Canaria Airport	Hub	
Spain (Canary Islands)	La Gomera	La Gomera Airport		
Spain (Canary Islands)	La Palma	La Palma Airport		
Spain (Canary Islands)	Lanzarote	Lanzarote Airport		
Spain (Canary Islands)	Tenerife	Tenerife North Airport	Hub	
Spain (Canary Islands)	Tenerife	Tenerife South Airport		
Spain (Mainland and Balearic Islands)	A Coruña	A Coruña Airport		
Spain (Mainland and Balearic Islands)	Asturias (Oviedo)	Asturias Airport		
Spain (Mainland and Balearic Islands)	Granada	Federico García Lorca Granada Airport		
Spain (Mainland and Balearic Islands)	Ibiza	Ibiza Airport	Terminated	
Spain (Mainland and Balearic Islands)	Jerez de la Frontera	Jerez Airport		
Spain (Mainland and Balearic Islands)	Madrid	Madrid–Barajas Airport		
Spain (Mainland and Balearic Islands)	Menorca	Menorca Airport		
Spain (Mainland and Balearic Islands)	Murcia	Región de Murcia International Airport		
Spain (Mainland and Balearic Islands)	Palma de Mallorca	Palma de Mallorca Airport		
Spain (Mainland and Balearic Islands)	Pamplona	Pamplona Airport		
Spain (Mainland and Balearic Islands)	San Sebastián	San Sebastián Airport		
Spain (Mainland and Balearic Islands)	Santander	Seve Ballesteros–Santander Airport		
Spain (Mainland and Balearic Islands)	Valladolid	Valladolid Airport		
Spain (Mainland and Balearic Islands)	Vigo	Vigo–Peinador Airport		
Spain (Mainland and Balearic Islands)	Zaragoza	Zaragoza Airport		
Senegal	Dakar	Blaise Diagne International Airport		
Western Sahara	Laayoune	Hassan I Airport		
Western Sahara	Dakhla	Dakhla Airport		

=== Codeshare agreements ===
- Azores Airlines
- Iberia

=== Interline agreements ===
- APG Airlines
- Hahn Air

== Fleet ==
=== Current fleet ===
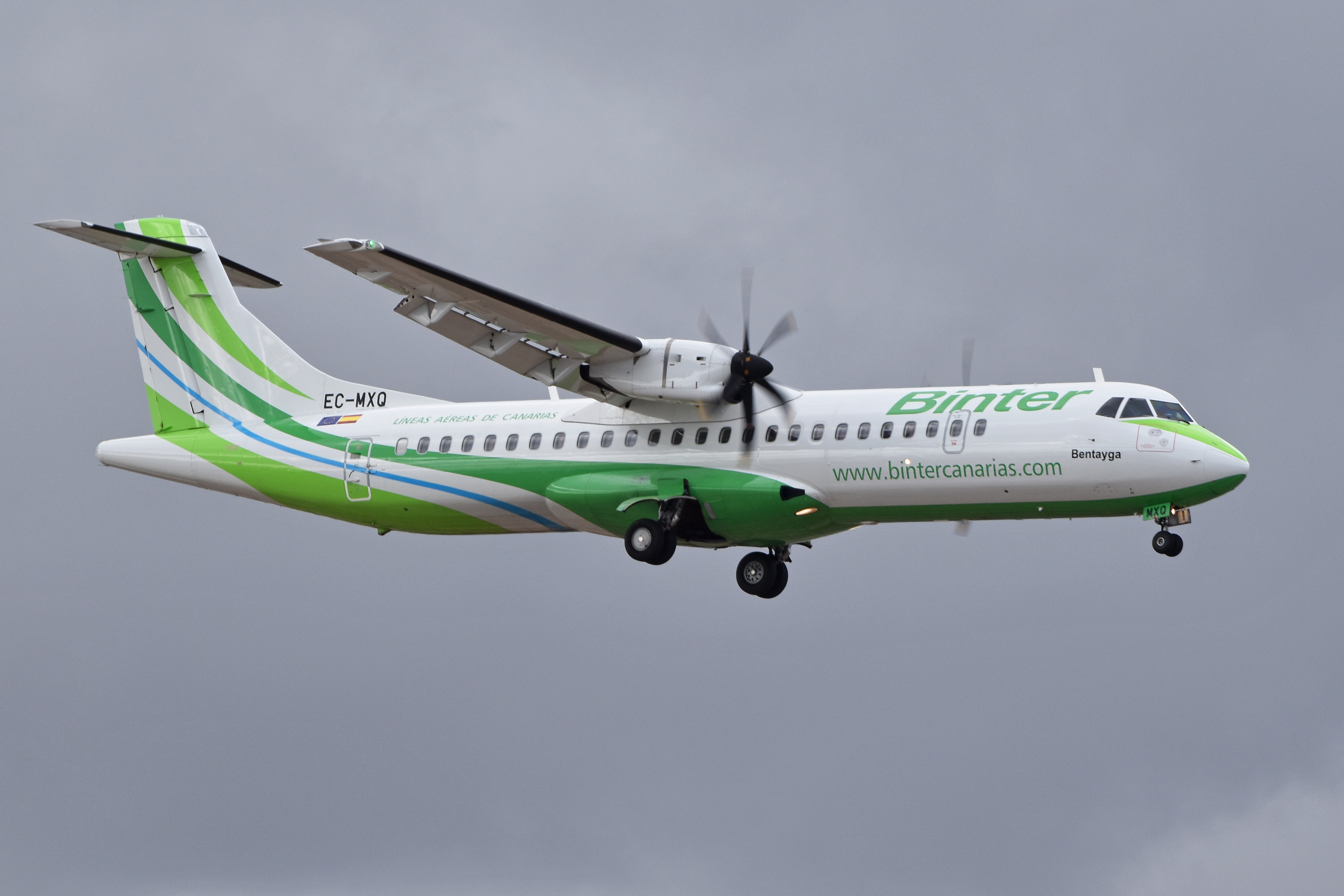
Binter Canarias ATR 72-600

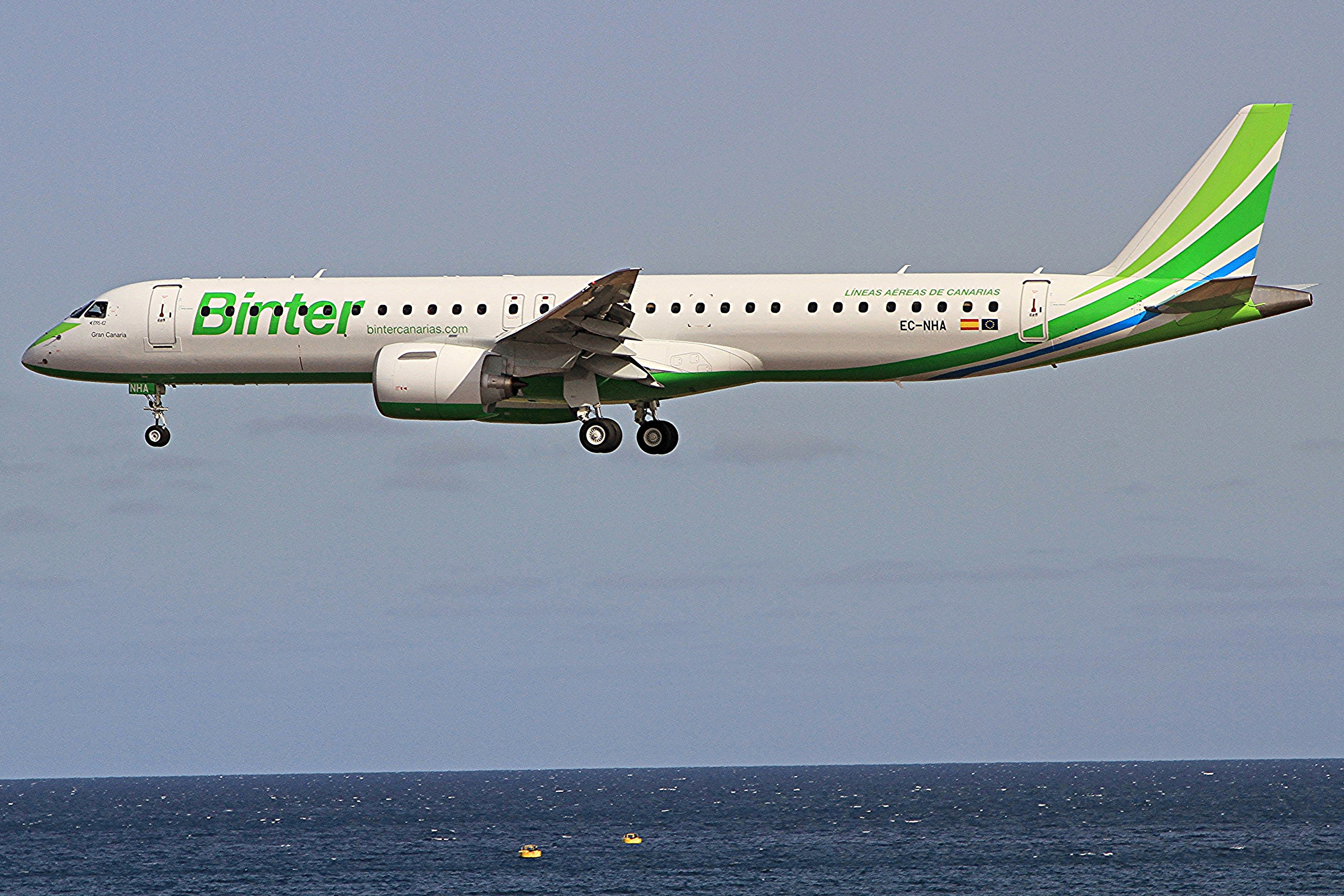
Binter Canarias Embraer E195-E2

As of August 2025, Binter Canarias operates the following aircraft:

Aircraft	In service	Orders	Passengers	Notes
ATR 72-600	26	—	72	14 operated by Canarias Airlines. 12 operated by Naysa Servicios Aéreos.
Embraer E195-E2	16	5	132	
Total	42	5		

=== Previous fleet ===
The Binter Canarias fleet has previously included the following aircraft:

- 31 ATR 72-202
- 1 Boeing 737-400 (leased from Futura International Airways)
- 8 Bombardier CRJ200 (leased from Air Nostrum)
- 3 Bombardier CRJ900 (leased from Air Nostrum)
- 3 Bombardier CRJ1000 (leased from Air Nostrum)
- 4 Douglas DC-9-30

== Accidents and incidents ==
- On 18 October 2016, an ATR 72-600 operated by NAYSA diverted to Gran Canaria Airport, Canary Islands, Spain, due to problems with the left hand main landing gear. The aircraft operated on a training flight, RSC001K, out of Tenerife-Norte Los Rodeos Airport. Upon returning to Tenerife, it was detected that one or both tires of the left hand main gear had burst or deflated. It was decided to divert to Las Palmas where the aircraft flew two low passes over runway 03L. A safe landing was then carried out at 12:22 UTC.

== See also ==
- Binter Mediterraneo, a former sister airline of Binter Canarias.
- Navegacion y Servicios Aéreos Canarios, a former subsidiary of Binter Canarias.
