= Tenerife North–Ciudad de La Laguna Airport =

International airport in the Canary Islands, Spain

Tenerife North-Ciudad de La Laguna Airport Aeropuerto de Tenerife Norte-Ciudad de La Laguna

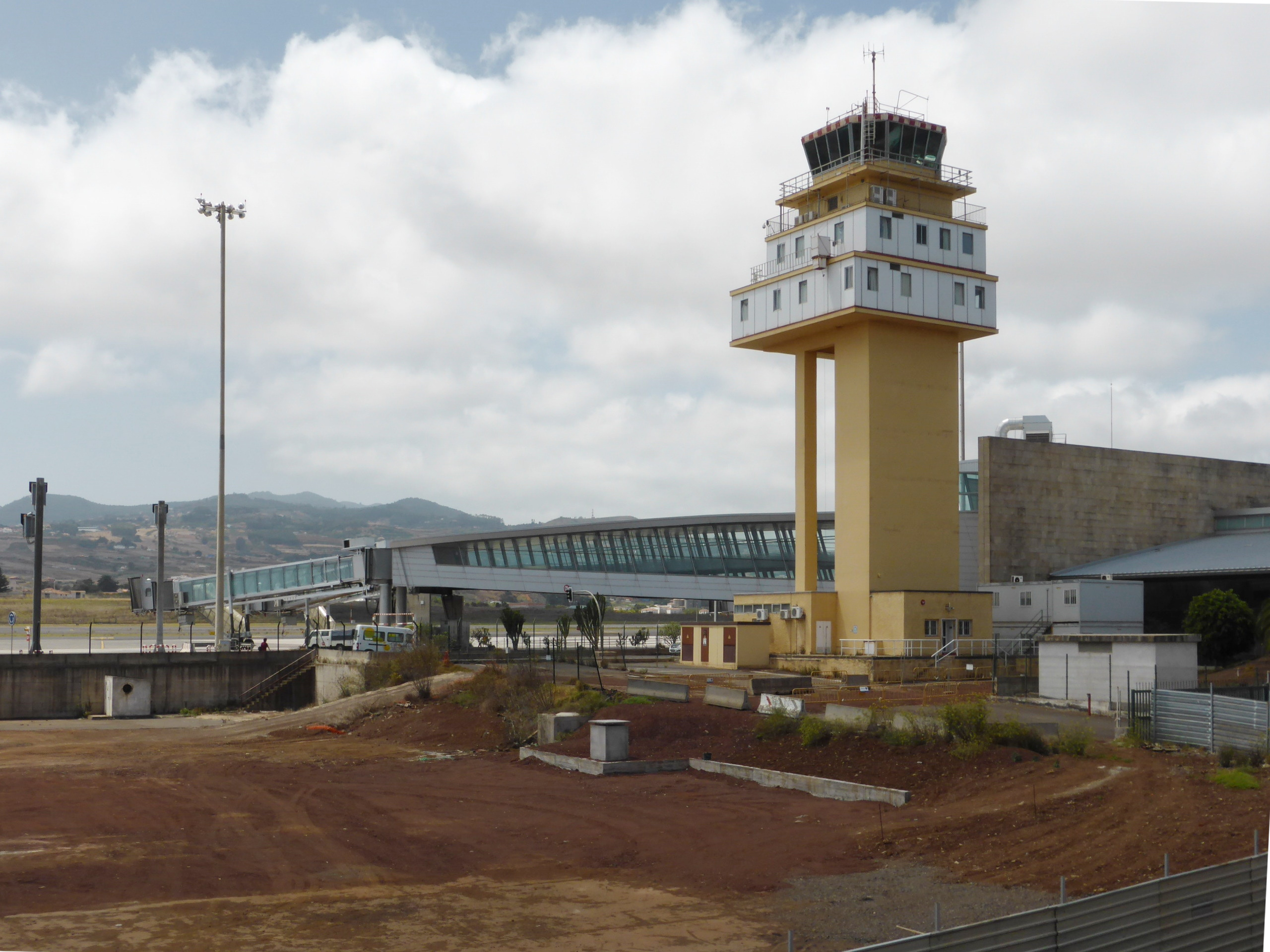
- Tenerife North Airport in 2013
- IATA: TFN; ICAO: GCXO

Summary
- Airport type: Public
- Owner/Operator: AENA
- Serves: Tenerife North
- Location: San Cristóbal de La Laguna, Canary Islands, Spain
- Opened: 1946
- Built: 1941
- Elevation AMSL: 633 m (2,077 ft)
- Coordinates: 28°28′58″N 016°20′30″W
- Website: aena.es

Map
- Location within Spain

Runways
Direction	Length		Surface
Direction	m	ft	Surface
12/30	3,171	10,404	Asphalt

Statistics (2025)
- Passengers: 7,174,977
- Passenger change 24-25: ▲6.1%
- Aircraft movements: 82,063
- Movements change 23-24: ▲9,1%
- Cargo (t): 12,861
- Cargo change 23-24: ▲11,3%
- Source: Statistics from AENA; Spanish AIP at EUROCONTROL

Tenerife North–Ciudad de La Laguna Airport (IATA: TFN, ICAO: GCXO), formerly Los Rodeos Airport, is the smaller of the two international airports on the island of Tenerife, Spain. It is located in San Cristóbal de La Laguna, about 11 km (7 mi) from Santa Cruz de Tenerife, at an elevation of 633 metres (2,077 ft). The airport handled 7,174,977 passengers in 2025. Together with Tenerife South Airport, Tenerife handles the highest passenger traffic in the Canary Islands, with a total of 21,144,655 passengers, surpassing the passenger traffic of Gran Canaria Airport. Today, TFN serves as an important inter-island hub, connecting the Canary Islands and providing links to the Iberian Peninsula and other European destinations.

In 1977, the airport was the site of the deadliest accident in aviation history, when two Boeing 747s collided on the runway in heavy fog conditions, killing 583 people.

== History ==
=== Early years ===
Many years before the airport had even been built, the field at Los Rodeos was hastily prepared to accommodate the first (though unofficial) flight into Tenerife operated by an Arado V I (D-1594) aircraft operating from Berlin on behalf of Deutsche Luft Hansa.

In May 1930, the Compañía de Líneas Aéreas Subvencionadas S.A. (C.L.A.S.S.A.) established the first air link between the Spanish mainland and the Canary Islands using a Ford 4-AT Trimotor (M-CKKA), which took off from Getafe, Madrid to the Los Rodeos field via Casablanca, Cape Juby and Gando in Gran Canaria.

After the final location of the airport had been decided, funds were gathered between 1935 and 1939 to build a small hangar and begin expanding the airstrip which would become Los Rodeos.

Operations into Los Rodeos recommenced on 23 January 1941 with a De Havilland DH89A Dragon Rapide operating an Iberia flight from Gando in Gran Canaria. By 1946, more hangars, a passenger terminal and an 800 m (2,625 ft) paved runway had been built, and the airport was officially opened to all national and international traffic. The runway was stretched at various times during the 1940s and 1950s, reaching a length of 2,400 m (7,874 ft) in 1953, by which time the airport was also equipped with runway edge lighting and an air-ground radio, enabling night operations.

=== Development since the 1960s ===
By 1964, runway 12/30 had been stretched to 3,000 m (9,843 ft) to accommodate the DC-8, new navigation aids were installed, and the apron was expanded to provide more parking spaces for aircraft. In 1971, with the prospect of the Boeing 747 flying into the airport, the runway was reinforced and an ILS (Instrument Landing System) was installed.

On 3 December 1972, Spantax Flight 275 crashed during take-off, killing everyone on board.

A new airport, Tenerife South Airport, was inaugurated on 6 November 1978. It was built because Tenerife North is very often covered with thick fog, and this was impacting safety, as shown by the Tenerife airport disaster, in which visibility was a contributing factor.

On 25 April 1980, Dan-Air Flight 1008 Boeing 727 crashed near the airport, killing all 146 on board, in a controlled flight into terrain accident.

A new terminal was opened at Tenerife North Airport in 2002, comprising car park, motorway access ramps, and four-story terminal building, with 12 gates, reopening the airport to international traffic. Until this point, the airport had been closed to international flights ever since Tenerife South had opened in 1978. In February 2003, Santa Bárbara Airlines transferred its Caracas service from Reina Sofía Airport to Tenerife North. An inter-island domestic area was opened in 2005.

In June 2009, Air Europa introduced a route to Miami using Airbus A330s. The service was supposed to end in October 2009, but high demand convinced the airline to shift the end date to January 2010. Air Europa then decided to continue flying to Miami on a seasonal basis. The flight resumed in June 2010; however, the carrier discontinued it four months later. Amid economic problems in Venezuela, SBA Airlines, formerly known as Santa Bárbara Airlines, terminated its flights to Caracas in February 2014. In June 2018, Plus Ultra Líneas Aéreas began flying the same route with Airbus A340s.

== Airlines and destinations ==
The following airlines operate regular scheduled and charter flights to and from Tenerife North:

Airlines	Destinations
Air Europa	Bilbao, Madrid, Seville
Binter Canarias	A Coruña, Asturias, Badajoz, El Hierro, Fuerteventura, Funchal, Granada, Gran Canaria, Jerez de la Frontera, La Gomera, Lanzarote, La Palma, Madrid, Murcia, Palma de Mallorca, Pamplona, Ponta Delgada, San Sebastián, Santander, Seville, Valencia, Valladolid, Vigo, Zaragoza; Seasonal: Marrakesh
CanaryFly	El Hierro, Fuerteventura, Gran Canaria, Lanzarote, La Palma
Iberia	Seasonal: Alicante, Asturias, Melilla, Santiago de Compostela, Valencia
Iberia Express	Madrid
Plus Ultra Líneas Aéreas	Caracas
TUI fly Deutschland	Düsseldorf, Frankfurt
Vueling	Alicante, Asturias, Barcelona, Bilbao, Granada, Málaga, Santiago de Compostela, Seville, Valencia
Wizz Air	Santiago de Compostela (begins 1 February 2027)

== Statistics ==
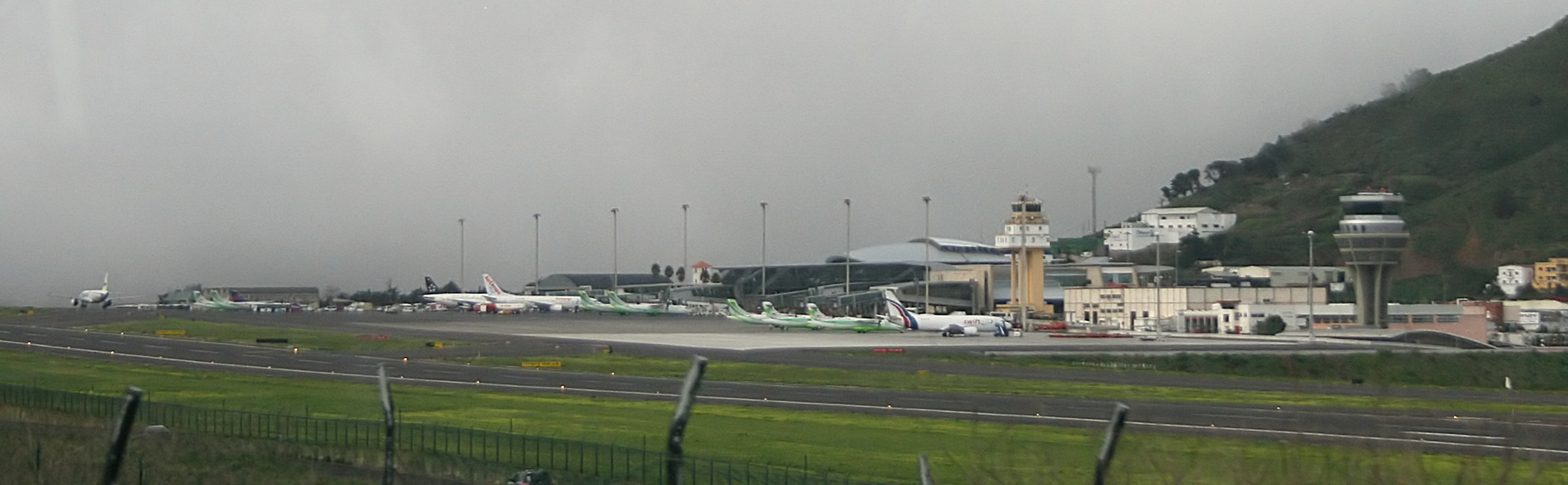
View of the airport (2010)

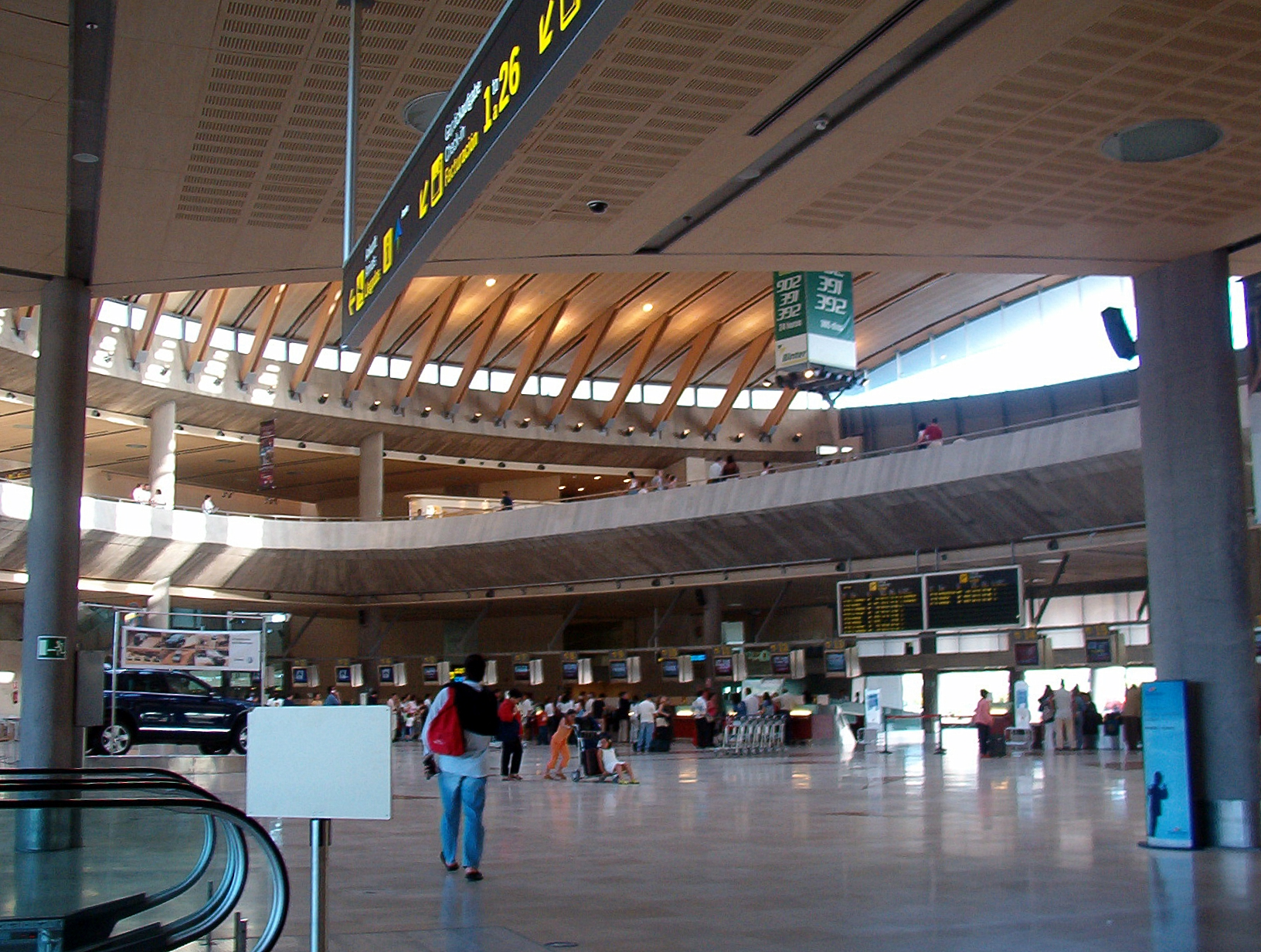
Check-in hall (2003)

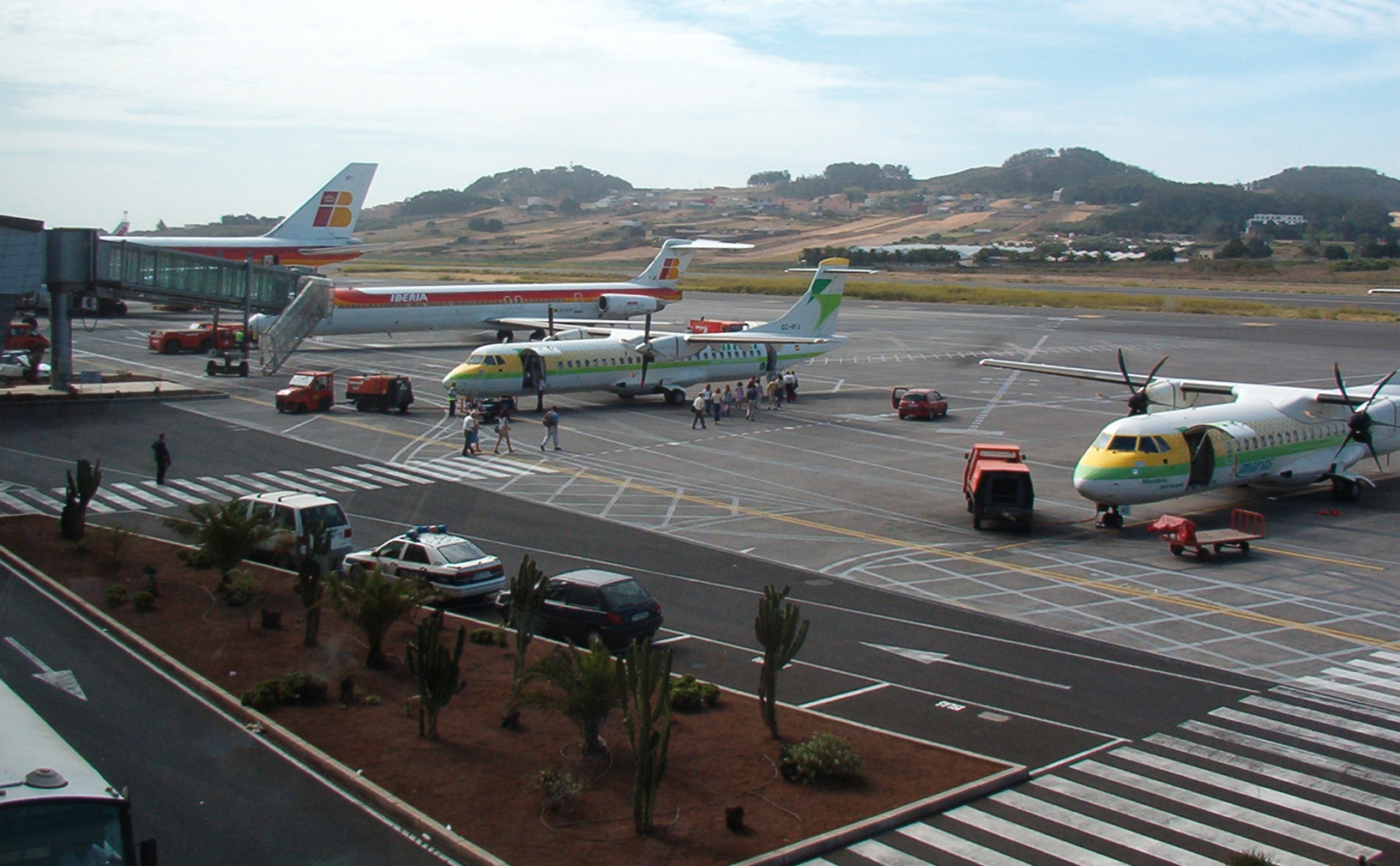
Apron view (2003)

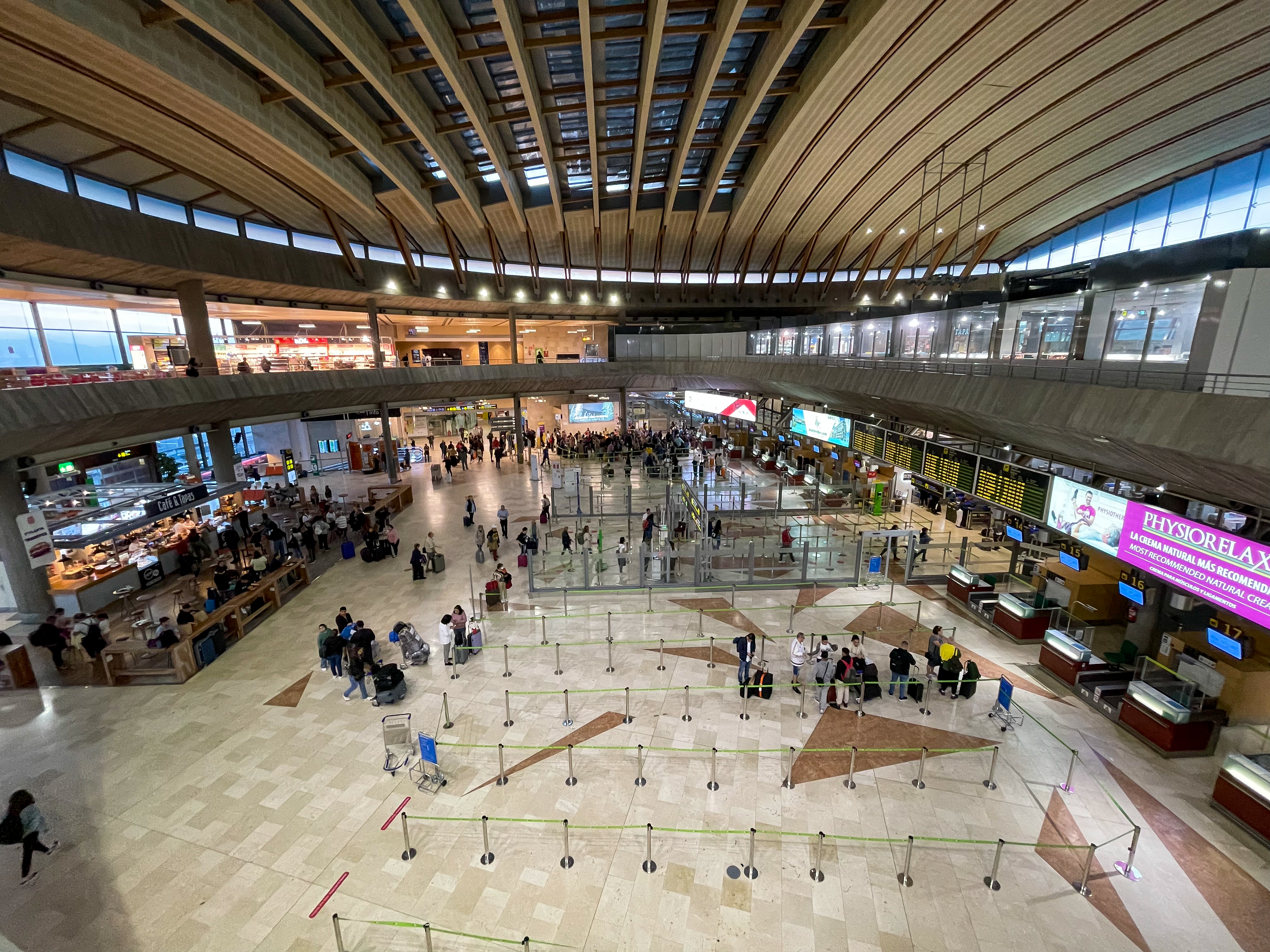
Inside the terminal (2022)

Traffic by calendar year
	Passengers	Aircraft movements	Cargo (tonnes)
2000	2,411,100	48,902	22,462
2001	2,511,277	49,132	21,060
2002	2,486,227	48,785	21,148
2003	2,919,087	53,718	23,842
2004	3,368,988	56,592	23,647
2005	3,754,513	60,235	22,163
2006	4,025,601	65,297	23,193
2007	4,125,131	65,843	25,169
2008	4,236,615	67,800	20,781
2009	4,054,147	62,776	18,304
2010	4,051,155	61,607	15,918
2011	4,095,103	62,590	15,745
2012	3,717,944	55,789	14,778
2013	3,524,470	49,289	13,493
2014	3,633,030	52,694	13,991
2015	3,815,315	53,259	12,819
2016	4,219,633	55,669	12,426
2017	4,704,863	61,098	13,044
2018	5,492,324	73,236	12,689
2019	5,840,483	75,385	12,596
2020	2,795,952	46,100	9,643
2021	3,840,160	54,581	11,884
2022	5,566,245	68,988	13,165
2023	6,120,550	75,194	11,561
Source: AENA

=== Busiest routes ===
Busiest international routes from TFN (2023)
Rank	Destination	Passengers	Change 2022/23
1	Lisbon	22,893	▲25%
2	Caracas	18,315	▲1382%
3	Funchal	12,940	▲10%
4	Sofia	1,871	New Route
5	Marrakesh	1,250	▲23%
Source: Estadísticas de tráfico aereo

Busiest domestic routes from TFN (2023)
Rank	Destination	Passengers	Change 2022/23
1	Madrid	1,413,257	▲10%
2	Gran Canaria	901,145	▲14%
3	La Palma	689,808	▲9%
4	Barcelona	628,727	▲9%
5	Lanzarote	405,579	▲5%
6	Fuerteventura	323,699	▲7%
7	Seville	312,848	▲14%
8	El Hierro	235,804	▲9%
9	Málaga	210,362	▲18%
10	Bilbao	190,789	▲6%
11	Valencia	157,147	▲24%
12	Santiago de Compostela	119,225	▲23%
13	Alicante	103,390	▲1%
14	Asturias	89,509	▲13%
15	La Gomera	58,194	▼4%
16	Zaragoza	51,940	▲4%
17	Palma de Mallorca	46,973	▼18%
18	Vigo	39,739	▲9%
19	Granada	34,844	▲11%
20	Jerez de la Frontera	20,499	0%
Source: Estadísticas de tráfico aereo

== Accidents and incidents ==
=== Tenerife airport disaster ===
On 27 March 1977, Tenerife North Airport (then Tenerife Los Rodeos) was the scene of the deadliest accident in aviation history, which claimed the lives of 583 people. While attempting to take off, KLM Flight 4805, a Boeing 747-206B, collided with Pan Am Flight 1736, a Boeing 747-121, which was taxiing along the runway. All 248 passengers and crew on the KLM flight were killed, along with 335 occupants of the Pan Am flight; however, 61 of the passengers and crew on board the Pan Am survived. Neither of the two airliners were originally scheduled to land on Tenerife, as both flights were bound for Gran Canaria Airport but had been diverted to Los Rodeos as a result of a terrorist bombing at Gran Canaria.

=== Other incidents ===
Date	Airline	Aircraft type	Registration	Flight number	People on board	Fatalities
1956-09-29	Aviaco	SNCASE Languedoc	EC-AKV		38	1 on ground
1964-07-03	Ejército del Aire	Douglas DC-3			21	4
1965-05-05	Iberia	Lockheed L-1049G	EC-AIN	401	49	30
1965-12-07	Spantax	Douglas DC-3	EC-ARZ		32	32
1966-09-16	Iberia	Douglas DC-3	EC-ACX	261	27	1
1970-01-05	Iberia	Fokker F-27 Friendship 600	EC-BOD		49	0
1972-12-03	Spantax	Convair CV-990	EC-BZR	275	155	155
1978-02-15	Sabena	Boeing 707-329	OO-SJE		196	0
1980-04-25	Dan-Air	Boeing 727-46	G-BDAN	1008	146	146

== Ground transport ==
Bus routes 20, 30, 103 and 343 serve the airport.
