= Asturias Airport =

International airport in Castrillón, Spain

Asturias Airport Aeropuerto de Asturias

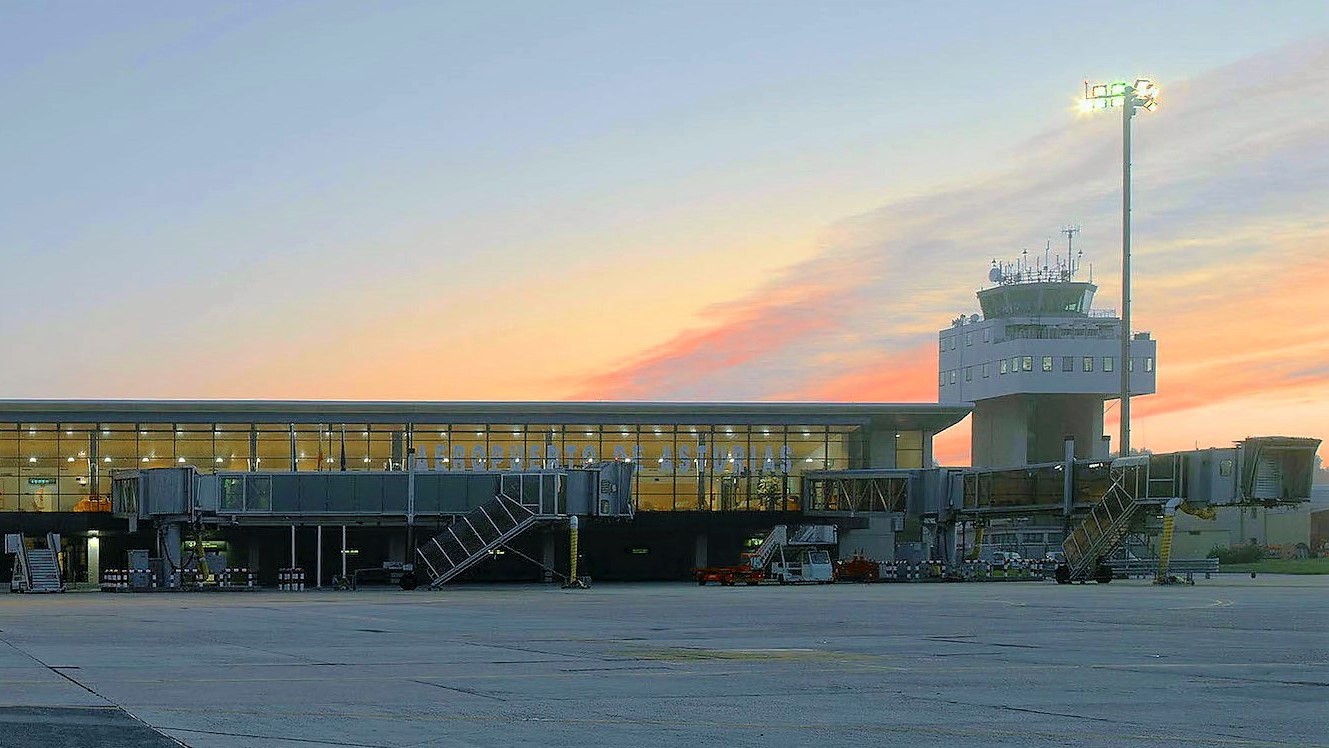
- IATA: OVD; ICAO: LEAS

Summary
- Airport type: Public
- Owner/Operator: AENA
- Serves: Asturias, Spain
- Opened: 11 June 1968
- Focus city for: Volotea
- Elevation AMSL: 127 m (417 ft)
- Coordinates: 43°33′49″N 06°02′05″W
- Website: aena.es

Map
- Location within Spain

Runways
Direction	Length		Surface
Direction	m	ft	Surface
11/29	2,200	7,218	Asphalt

Statistics (2025)
- Passengers: 2,051,342
- Passengers change 24–25: ▲2,9%
- Movements: 15,783
- Movements change 24-25: ▲2.0%
- Cargo (t): 6.6
- Sources: AENA

Asturias Airport (IATA: OVD, ICAO: LEAS) is the only international airport of Asturias, Spain, in Castrillón. Traffic consists primarily of scheduled domestic flights and some seasonal scheduled international flights. In 2024, the airport handled 1,993,256 passengers and managed 15,465 operations. The airport is located in Anzu, parish of Santiago del Monte, municipality of Castrillón, 15 km from Avilés, 40 km from Gijón and 47 km from the regional capital, Oviedo.

== History ==
The airport first opened on 11 June 1968. The first commercial route was established with Madrid and soon after another route came into operation, which linked Santiago de Compostela with Barcelona via Asturias and Bilbao.

In 1980, the airport underwent its first major expansion in preparation for the 1982 FIFA World Cup in Spain. In 1982, the aircraft parking platform doubled in size. An additional five check-in desks were added to the existing ones. Two boarding gates and two arrival gates, a new cafeteria-restaurant and several shops were also new additions.

Further improvements occurred in 1994 and 2000 which included upgrading of the building and expansion of the apron.

In 2003, a series of improvements were made to the airport, that would enable it to handle a higher volume of passengers and aircraft traffic. Construction work on adding a second floor to the airport, that was accessible to passengers, was completed, and three jet bridges were also installed, allowing passengers to embark directly from the terminal building onto the aircraft.

== Airlines and destinations ==
The following airlines operate regular scheduled and charter services to and from Asturias:

Airlines	Destinations
Aer Lingus	Seasonal: Dublin
Air Europa	Madrid
Binter Canarias	Gran Canaria, Tenerife–North
Iberia	Madrid; Seasonal: Melilla
KLM	Seasonal: Amsterdam
Lufthansa	Seasonal: Frankfurt
Volotea	Alicante, Barcelona, Brussels, Florence, Gran Canaria, Granada, Jerez, Lanzarote, Lisbon, Madrid, Málaga, Milan–Bergamo, Paris–Orly, Porto, Rome–Fiumicino, Seville, Tenerife–South, Valencia; Seasonal: Castellón, Fuerteventura, Ibiza, Menorca, Murcia, Palma de Mallorca
Vueling	Barcelona, Tenerife–North, Palma de Mallorca
Wizz Air	London–Luton, Madrid, Valencia

== Statistics ==
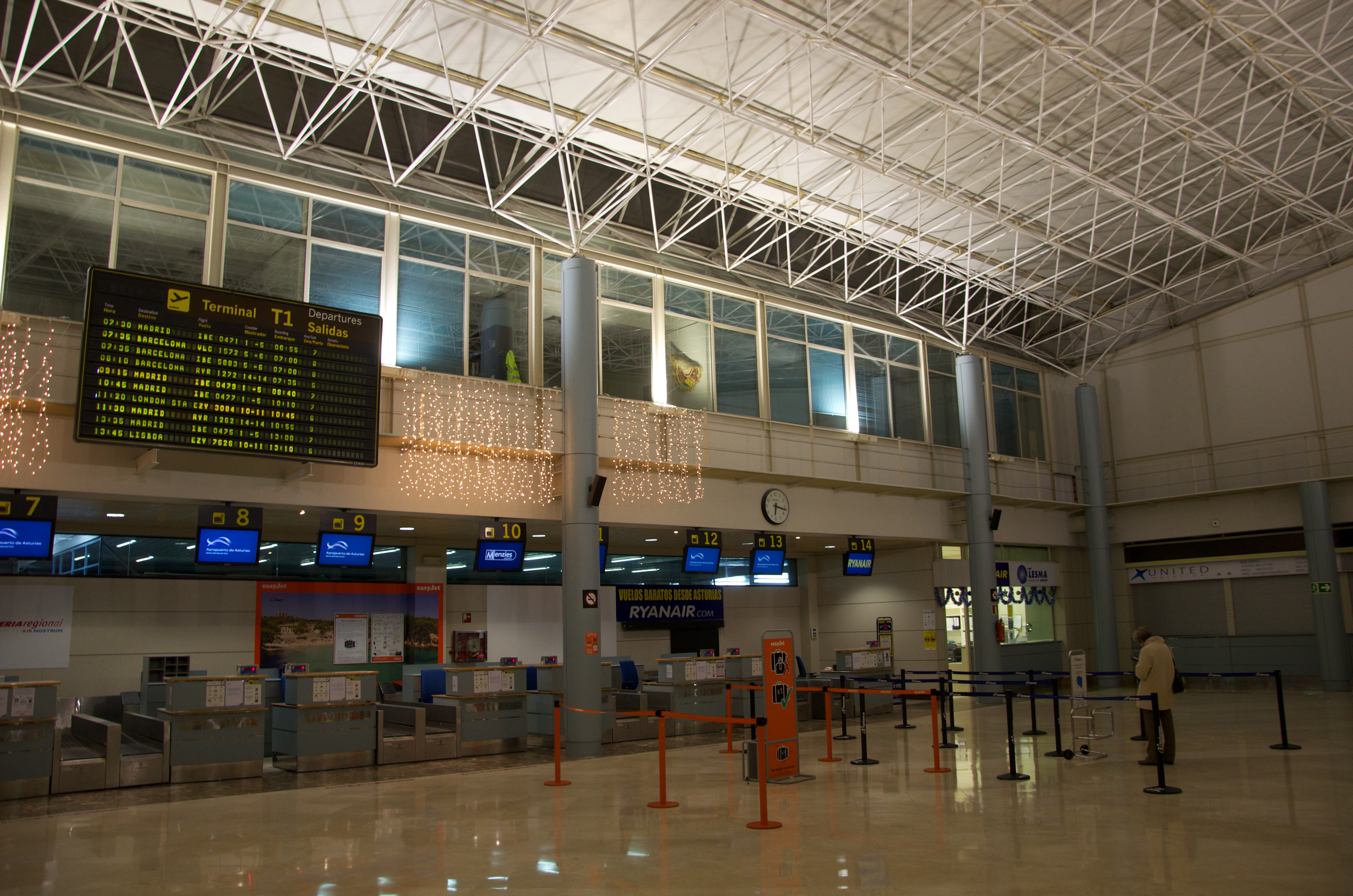
Check-in hall

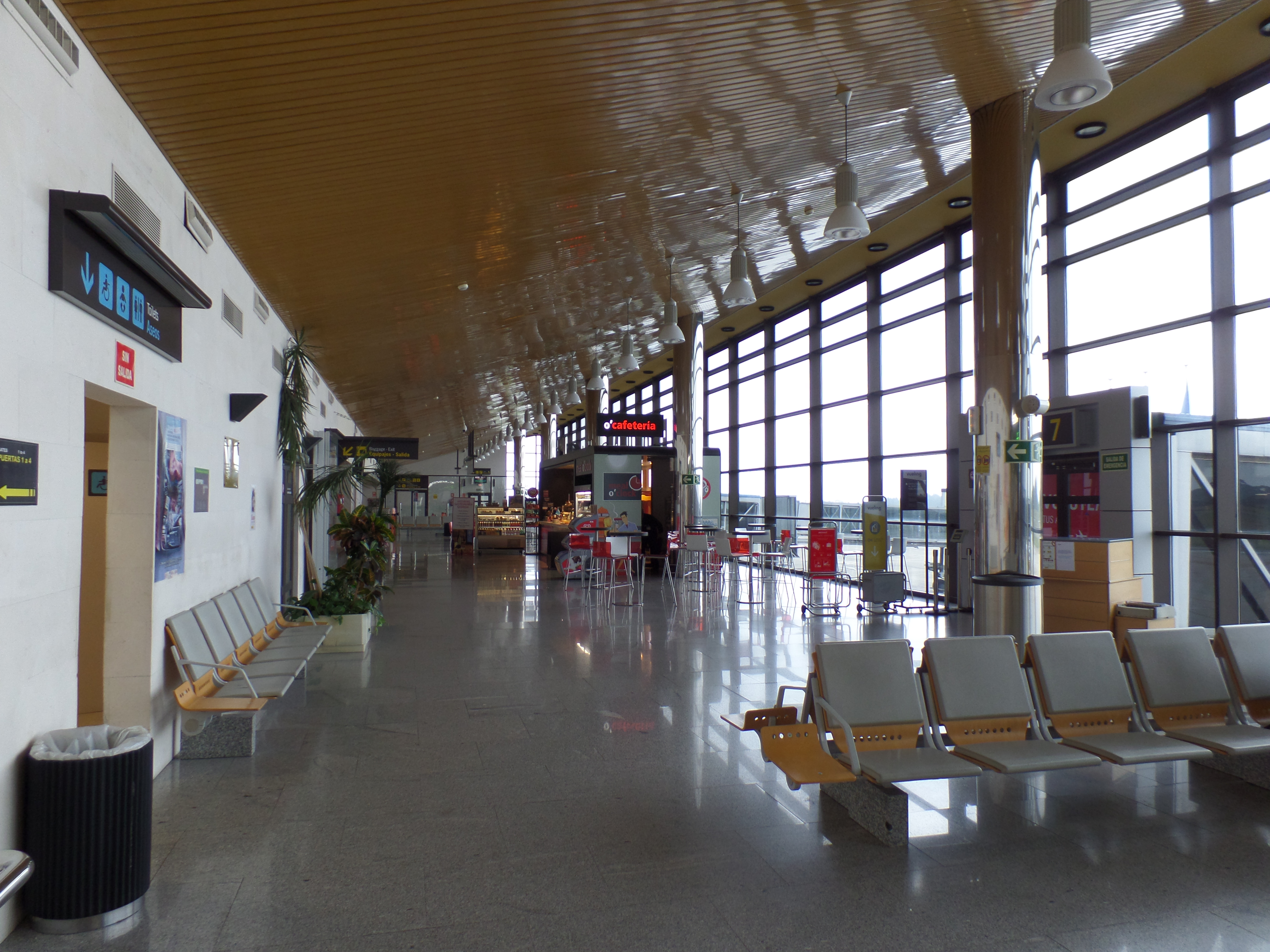
Terminal interior

Year	Passenger numbers	Air cargo (kg.)	Flight operations
2001	816,087 (19th)	641,241 (22nd)	12,526 (27th)
2002	774,317 (20th)	577,235 (22nd)	12,036 (27th)
2003	839,814 (24th)	484,441 (23rd)	12,867 (27th)
2004	943,992 (22nd)	420,256 (24th)	14,198 (26th)
2005	1,251,495 (21st)	230,201 (28th)	17,535 (21st)
2006	1,353,030 (21st)	199,437 (25th)	17,987 (26th)
2007	1,560,830 (20th)	196,741 (26th)	19,148 (28th)
2008	1,530,248 (19th)	139,455 (25th)	18,371 (26th)
2009	1,316,088 (20th)	113,149 (24th)	16,033 (27th)
2010	1,355,364 (19th)	110,645 (25th)	16,538 (25th)
2011	1,339,010 (19th)	136,772 (23rd)	15,349 (25th)
2012	1,309,640 (18th)	101,782 (25th)	13,252 (25th)
2013	1,039,409 (19th)	94,361 (29th)	10,407 (23rd)
2014	1,065,570 (19th)	71,202 (24th)	11,715 (24th)
2015	1,119,273 (18th)	64,237 (26th)	10,758 (27th)
2016	1,281,979 (18th)	53,638 (24th)	11,928 (25th)
2017	1,407,217 (18th)	32,860 (25th)	13,005 (24th)
2018	1,400,481 (19th)	33,038 (26th)	12,444 (26th)
2019	1,417,433 (19th)	28,538 (26th)	13,406 (25th)
2020	498,950 (18th)	19,733 (25th)	6,196 (31st)
2021	831,793 (17th)	7,305 (25th)	8,064 (32nd)
2022	1,454,763 (17th)	9,404 (25th)	12,189 (30th)
2023	1,974,850 (17th)	11,494 (25th)	15,289 (27th)
2024	1,993,256 (18th)	7,184 (25th)	15,465 (26th)

=== Busiest routes ===
Busiest international routes from OVD (2023)
Rank	Destination	Passengers	Change 2022/23
1	London-Gatwick	61,530	▲47%
2	Rome-Fiumicino	45,718	▲630%
3	London-Stansted	42,344	▲546%
4	Paris-Orly	39,834	▲41%
5	Charleroi	33,294	▲470%
6	Bergamo	32,020	New route
7	Lisbon	31,099	New route
8	Weeze	30,468	▲505%
9	Amsterdam	28,979	▲515%
10	Dublin	26,439	▲465%
Source: Estadísticas de tráfico aereo

Busiest domestic routes from OVD (2023)
Rank	Destination	Passengers	Change 2022/23
1	Madrid	394,572	▲21%
2	Barcelona	373,819	▲51%
3	Málaga	112,280	▲7%
4	Alicante	106,110	▼1%
5	Palma de Mallorca	94,303	▼6%
6	Gran Canaria	93,693	▲25%
7	Seville	90,060	▼23%
8	Tenerife-North	89,194	▲12%
9	Valencia	70,132	▲19%
10	Lanzarote	41,435	▲10%
11	Menorca	23,243	▼16%
12	Granada	17,606	New route
13	Tenerife-South	15,932	▼22%
14	Ibiza	13,328	▼40%
15	Murcia	10,695	▲13%
Source: Estadísticas de tráfico aereo

== Ground transport ==
- Road - The airport may be reached by both the A-8 motorway and the N-632 national road.
- Bus - Alsa coach company offers a service between the airport and the cities of Avilés, Gijón and Oviedo. Some routes also stop in Piedras Blancas and Salinas.
- Taxis - These are available at the airport.
- Car rental services - Avis and Hello Rent a Car.
