= Matilde de Soignie =

Asturian writer, poet and teacher

- Born: Matilde de Soignie de las Alas-Pumariño; 13 March 1851; Avilés, Asturias, Spain
- Died: 1927 (aged 75–76)
- Occupations: Writer, poet, schoolteacher
- Relatives: Adolphe de Soignie (father)
- Writing career
- Pen name: Una Avelesina, Una Asturiana
- Language: Asturian, Spanish
- Genre: Poetry
- Notable work: Ecos de mi aldea (1890)

Matilde de Soignie (13 March 1851–1927) was an Asturian writer, poet and teacher of Belgian origin. Writing under the pseudonyms Una Avelesina and Una Asturiana, she authored Ecos de mi aldea, one of the earliest known books written by a woman in the Asturian language.

Long forgotten after its publication in the nineteenth century, her work attracted renewed scholarly attention following the rediscovery of a surviving manuscript in 2019 and the subsequent identification of an 1890 printed edition. Modern scholars regard her as one of the earliest known women writers in Asturian literature and one of the pioneers of female literary expression in the language.

== Life ==
Little documentary evidence concerning her life has survived. Matilde de Soignie de las Alas-Pumariño was born in Avilés on 13 March 1851 and died in 1927. She was the daughter of the Belgian mining engineer Adolphe G. de Soignie, who became director of coal-mining operations at Arnao for the Real Compañía Asturiana de Minas in 1838, and Matilde de las Alas-Pumariño.

She belonged to the progressive bourgeoisie of nineteenth-century Avilés. According to family sources, her father provided his daughters with an education comparable to that usually reserved for boys, an uncommon practice in Spain at the time. De Soignie acquired a broad education and was reportedly fluent in French. Her studies included history, geography, grammar, arithmetic, bookkeeping and religion. She remained unmarried by choice and worked as a teacher in Avilés. In addition to her own literary activities, she translated works written by her uncle Jules de Soignie, a journalist and civil servant.

== Ecos de mi aldea ==
De Soignie wrote in Asturian under the pseudonyms Una Avelesina ("A Woman from Avilés") and Una Asturiana ("A Woman from Asturias"). Her only known surviving work is Ecos de mi aldea ("Echoes of My Village"), a collection of poems composed around 1870. Several of the poems were first published in newspapers circulating in Avilés and were written while the author spent summers in Naveces. The collection belongs to the principal literary tendencies of nineteenth-century Asturian literature, particularly costumbrista and Spanish regionalist writing. Her poems depict village life, emigration to Cuba seeking economic opportunity and return as a wealthy indiano, local festivals, popular customs and courtship. One of its most distinctive features is its bilingual structure. Spanish is used primarily for narrative and descriptive passages, while Asturian predominates in dialogue.

Modern scholarship has paid particular attention to the portrayal of women in de Soignie's poetry, which differs significantly from prevailing nineteenth-century expectations. Several female characters exhibit a degree of independence that scholars consider unusual for the period. The character Flora rejects pressure to marry for financial advantage and insists on making her own decisions regarding her future. The character Rosa is even more explicit in defending her autonomy. She rejects attempts by her suitor Xuan to control her behaviour and insists on her freedom to interact with others without male supervision.

== Rediscovery and legacy ==
Ecos de mi aldea remained unknown to literary historians for more than a century. In 2019, a surviving typescript manuscript was discovered among family papers by the author's relative Mercedes de Soignie Fernández. The manuscript was signed Una Avelesina and included a note stating that the poems had originally appeared in newspapers published in Avilés. The text was subsequently edited and published by the Academia de la Llingua Asturiana in its collection Cartafueyos de lliteratura escaecida. Her work has become the subject of scholarly studies, public lectures, documentaries and reassessments of nineteenth-century Asturian literary culture.

In 2021, researcher Inaciu Galán discovered evidence that the work had already appeared in print in 1890. The find demonstrated that de Soignie was not simply a manuscript author but a published writer whose work circulated publicly. It has been suggested that the edition may have been intended for Asturian emigrants living in Cuba. This discovery established de Soignie as the second known woman to publish a book in Asturian during her lifetime, after Enriqueta González Rubín.

The recovery of her writings has also contributed to broader efforts to document the role of women in the development of Asturian literature. She is now generally situated alongside other early women writers in Asturian literature, including Josefa Jovellanos, Teresa Cónsul and Enriqueta González Rubín.

== Works ==
- Soignie, Matilde de (1890). Ecos de mi aldea (in Asturian). Avilés. hdl:2027/hvd.hnpfg2. Written c. 1870; rediscovered in manuscript form in 2019.
- Soignie, Matilde de (2019). Ecos de mi aldea (hacia 1870) (in Asturian). Oviedo: Academia de la Llingua Asturiana. ISBN 9788481685619. Posthumous edition

== Sources ==
- Álvarez Rodríguez, Elena (2022). "Ecos de mi aldea de Matilde de Soignie". Lletres Asturianes (in Asturian) (126): 189–199. doi:10.17811/LLAA.126.2022.189-199. ISSN 0212-0534.
- Arias, Ruth (4 April 2019). "Matilde de Soignie tiene una visión feminista insólita en el siglo XIX" [Matilde de Soignie has an unusual feminist perspective for the nineteenth century]. El Comercio (in Spanish).
- "Cultura clausura en Madrid la 46 Selmana de les Lletres Asturianes con la presentación de 'Per toa tierra', un homenaje literario a la emigración" [Culture concludes the 46th Asturian Literature Week in Madrid with the presentation of 'Per toa tierra', a literary tribute to emigration]. Actualidad (in Spanish). Gobierno del Principado de Asturias. 14 May 2025.
- R. D. (12 May 2022). "El libro de Matilde de Soignie tuvo al menos tres ediciones y un gran éxito en La Habana" [Matilde de Soignie's book had at least three editions and was a great success in Havana]. El Comercio (in Spanish).
- de Soignie, Mercedes (2016). Caminos del ayer, huellas del mañana [Yesterday's Paths, Tomorrow's Footprints] (in Spanish). Oviedo: HiFer. ISBN 9788416209774.
- Galán, Inaciu (2 December 2021). "Inaciu Galán desveló que la escritora avilesina Matilde de Soignie llegó a imprenta con un llibru n'asturianu en 1890" [Inaciu Galán revealed that the Avilés writer Matilde de Soignie had a book printed in Asturian in 1890]. Formientu (in Asturian).
- González-Palomares, David (20 January 2026). "Un siècle et demi de présence belge dans les Asturies : impact et pertinence des investissements belges dans l'exploitation houillère asturienne (1833–1987)" [A century and a half of Belgian presence in Asturias: impact and relevance of Belgian investment in Asturian coal mining (1833–1987)]. Entreprises et histoire (in French). 120 (3): 172–192. doi:10.54695/eh.120.0172. ISSN 1161-2770.
- Gorena, Fernando R. (30 November 2017). "«Adolfo de Soignie no fue un personaje estrella», señala su tataranieta Mercedes" [Adolfo de Soignie was not a star figure, says his great-great-granddaughter Mercedes]. La Nueva España (in Spanish).
- Montes, I. (3 December 2016). "La mina de Arnao presenta un manuscrito del ingeniero De Soignie" [The Arnao mine presents a manuscript by engineer De Soignie]. La Nueva España (in Spanish).
- Muñiz Sánchez, Jorge (2019). "El germen belga de la industrialización en el norte de España. Asturias, 1833–1838" [The Belgian origins of industrialisation in northern Spain: Asturias, 1833–1838]. Signos históricos (in Spanish). 21 (41): 42–67. ISSN 1665-4420.
- Muñiz Sánchez, Jorge (2020). "A la cumbre por un valle. Adolphe Desoignie, un ingeniero de minas pionero en la Asturias protoindustrial" [To the summit through a valley: Adolphe Desoignie, a pioneering mining engineer in proto-industrial Asturias]. Historia Contemporánea (in Spanish) (64): 749–773. doi:10.1387/hc.20727. ISSN 2340-0277.
- Muñiz Sánchez, Jorge (2020b). "Del pozo a la avenida. Adolphe Desoignie, un ingeniero de minas polifacético en las infraestructuras de la Asturias del XIX" [From the Mine Shaft to the Avenue: Adolphe Desoignie, a Multifaceted Mining Engineer in the Infrastructure of Nineteenth-Century Asturias]. Vínculos de Historia (in Spanish). 9: 383–398. doi:10.18239/vdh_2020.09.19. ISSN 2254-6901.
