= Castillo de Salas (ship) =

Spanish bulk carrier ship

Coordinates: 43°33′20″N 5°39′40″W

History

Spain
- Name: Castillo de Salas
- Owner: Empresa Nacional Elcano
- Builder: Astilleros y Talleres del Noroeste (ASTANO), Fene, Galicia
- Launched: 20 December 1979
- Identification: IMO number: 7624192
- Fate: Wrecked, 11 January 1986

General characteristics
- Type: Bulk carrier
- Tonnage: 51,000 GT; 109,488 DWT
- Length: 261.43 m (857 ft 9 in)
- Beam: 40 m (131 ft 3 in)
- Depth: 20 m (65 ft 7 in)
- Propulsion: Sulzer 7RND90 diesel engine, 20,300 hp (15,138 kW)

Castillo de Salas was a Spanish bulk carrier that was launched in Ferrol on 20 December 1979 and completed in August 1980. It measured over 50,000 gross tons, and had a deadweight of over 100,000 tons, measuring approximately 250 metres (820 ft) in length, 40 metres (130 ft) across the beam, and 14.5 metres (48 ft) in the draft. It required a crew complement of 32.

== Wreck and salvage ==
During the morning of 11 January 1986 Castillo de Salas, owned by the Spanish company Elcano, ran aground over rocks 740 metres (2,430 ft) north northwest of Gijón. The ship was anchored outside Gijón's seaport (El Musel) when the ship's anchor came loose in bad weather. Efforts to re-anchor, self-propel and even tow the ship away from the coast failed due to harsh seas. The cargo was nearly 100,000 metric tons (98,000 long tons; 110,000 short tons) of coal loaded in Norfolk, Virginia as well as over 1,000 tonnes (980 long tons; 1,100 short tons) of fuel oil used for propulsion. On 15 January 1986 the hull broke in two during efforts to bring the ship afloat, therefore releasing a spill of diesel oil and coal ore.

On 23 February 1986 the bow half of the hull was refloated, towed 63 kilometres (39 mi) into the sea and scuttled in waters of 4,000 metres (13,000 ft) in depth. Officials stated that no diesel oil was left in the bow section of the hull. During the following spring, the company Fondomar was tasked with salvaging the remainder of the stern portion of the hull.

=== Second salvage of the stern section ===
Small balls of decomposed oil were found sporadically until 2001, when a major find of these balls was confirmed to be from fuel remaining in the double bottom fuel tank of the stern section that was not removed in 1986. This led to a second salvage operation to remove the fuel during 2001–2002 and the complete removal of the remainder of the wreck in 2003 due to public out-cry.

== Trophies ==
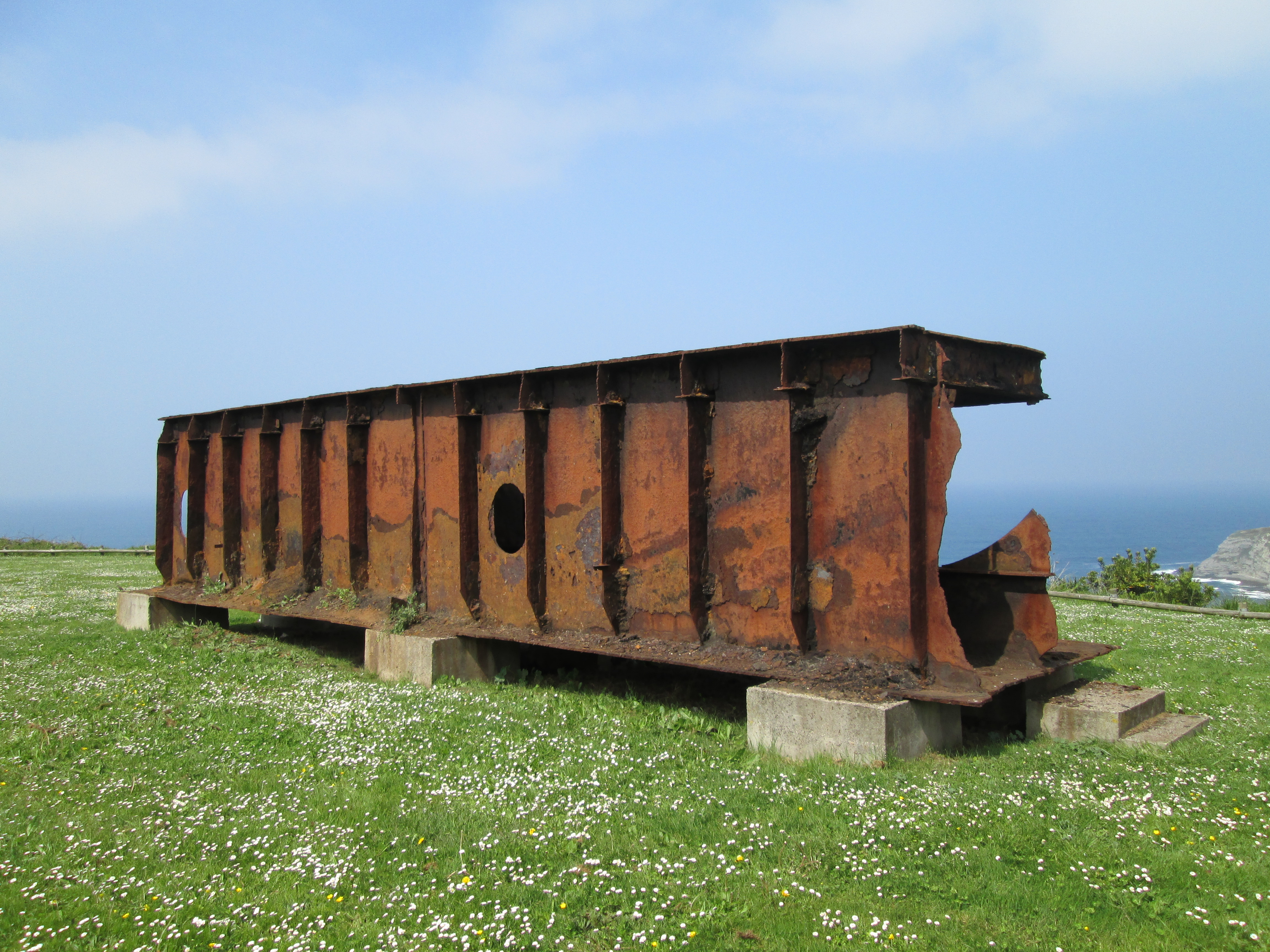
"Memoria", by Joaquín Rubio Camín

On 15 November 2003 Gijón artist Joaquín Rubio Camín's sculpture "Memoria" (Memory) was unveiled on the Camino del Cervigón overlooking the sea. The sculpture was made using part of the remains of Castillo de Salas which sank off Gijón and were recovered earlier in the year.

One of the ship's anchors is displayed in the Philippe Cousteau Anchor Museum in Salinas beach, Spain, 30 kilometres (19 mi) west of Gijón.

== Side effects ==
Since the incident, it has been common to find dark sand contaminated with coal on the beaches in the Bay of Gijón, particularly after rough sea conditions. The amounts recovered continue to reduce over time, but patches of dark coloured sand, high in black coal particles, can be seen at low tide.
