= Bayas (Castrillón) =

- Parish

- Location within Spain
- Coordinates: 43.575278°N 6.028333°W
- Country: Spain Spain
- Autonomous community: Asturias
- Province: Asturias
- Municipality: Castrillón

Area
  - Total: 6.25 km^{2} (2.41 sq mi)

Population (2011)
  - Total: 96
  - Density: 15.36/km^{2} (39.8/sq mi)

Bayas is one of eight parishes (administrative divisions) in Castrillón, a municipality within the province and autonomous community of Asturias, in northern Spain.

== Population ==
It has a population of 96 inhabitants (INE 2011) in 63 households.

== Location ==
Bayas occupies an area of 6.25 km ². It is located in the northwest of the council, 8 km from the capital, Piedrasblancas. It is bordered on the north by the Cantabrian Sea, on the east by the parish of Naveces, on the south by Santiagu'l Monte, and on the west by the municipality of Sotu'l Barcu.

Within the parish, there is the natural monument of the island of La Deva and the Bayas beach area.

== Populations ==
According to the 2009 list, the parish is formed by the following populations:

- Bayas (village) 43.576171°, - 6.024933°: 43 inhabitants.
- Infiesta (locale) 43.569402° - 6.020905°: 34 inhabitants.
- El Camín de Muniellas (locale): 0 inhabitants.
- Navalón (locale) 43.572503° - 6.030425°: 32 inhabitants.
- El Pinu (locale): 0 inhabitants.
- L'Arandona (locale): 0 inhabitants.
- La Roza (locale): 14 inhabitants.
- El Camín de Sablón (locale): 0 inhabitants.

Meanwhile, the village of Bayas is divided into the following districts:

- El Cuetu 43.577747° - 6.020833°: 29 inhabitants.
- La Pedrera: 2 inhabitants.
- El Padrón: 12 inhabitants.
