= Santa María del Mar =

Santa María del Mar may refer to:

- Santa María del Mar (Castrillón), a civil parish of Castrillón, Asturias, Spain
- Santa Maria del Mar, Barcelona, a church in Barcelona, Spain
- Santa María del Mar, Havana, a beach east of Havana, Cuba
- Santa María del Mar District, Lima, a district of Lima, Peru
- Santa María del Mar, a community in Juchitán de Zaragoza, Oaxaca, Mexico
