= Tomás Zerolo airfield =

Former airport in Tenerife

Tomás Zerolo airfield Spanish: aeródromo "Tomás Zerolo"
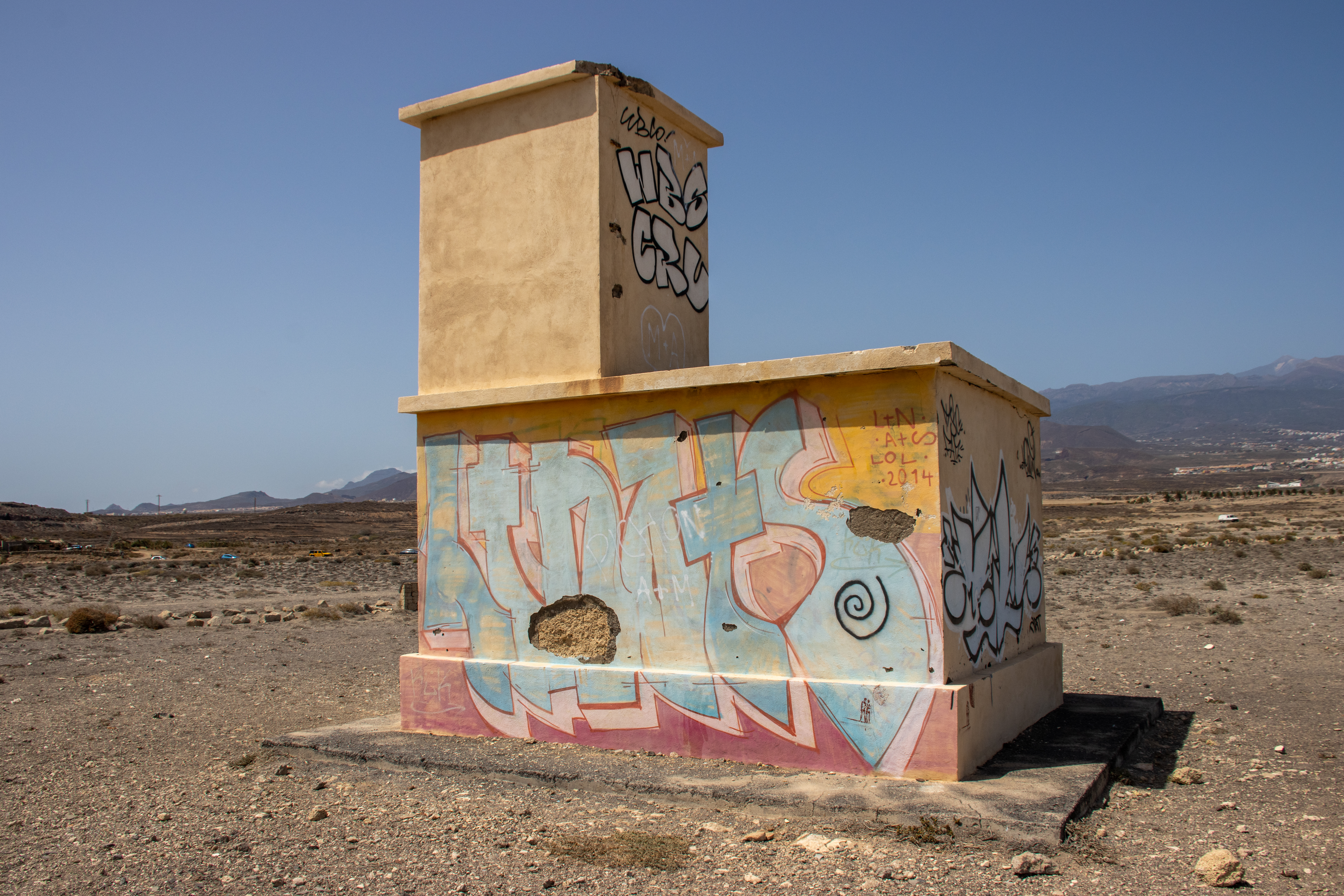
- IATA: none; ICAO: none

Summary
- Location: Tenerife
- Opened: 30 September 1962
- Closed: 1978
- Coordinates: 28°02′09″N 16°32′52″W

Map
- Location within Tenerife

Tomás Zerolo airfield (Spanish: aeródromo "Tomás Zerolo") was an aerodrome near El Médano, Granadilla de Abona, Tenerife, Canary Islands. It operated between 1962 and 1978. Only the remains of the control tower still exist.

== Operation ==
The site was initially used by the Aeroclub de Tenerife, who constructed a 780 metres (2,560 ft) auxiliary runway in 1947. The first landing was on 21 January 1948. Subsequently, the site was turned into a private aerodrome, which entered operation on 30 September 1962. The inauguration was attended by a Douglas DC-3 from Iberia, a military Junkers Ju 52, four T-5 aircraft from the Gando Air Base in Gran Canaria, and six planes from Aeroclub de Tenerife. The aerodrome was used both for planes and balloons. The first balloon departure was the 'Pequino Mundo' in 1964.

Although a private aerodrome, it was available for emergencies, for example from the airforce or commercial aircraft. On 3 February 1963 the airfield was used to airlift people rescued from the collapse of the Granadilla City Hall, which had left 23 dead and over a hundred people were injured. A Douglas DC-3 from the TASSA airline was used to transfer wounded to Tenerife North Airport.

== Closure ==
It closed in 1978, when the newly built Tenerife South Airport entered service nearby. The control tower building is the only remaining structure from the aerodrome.
