= El Musel =

Port of Gijón
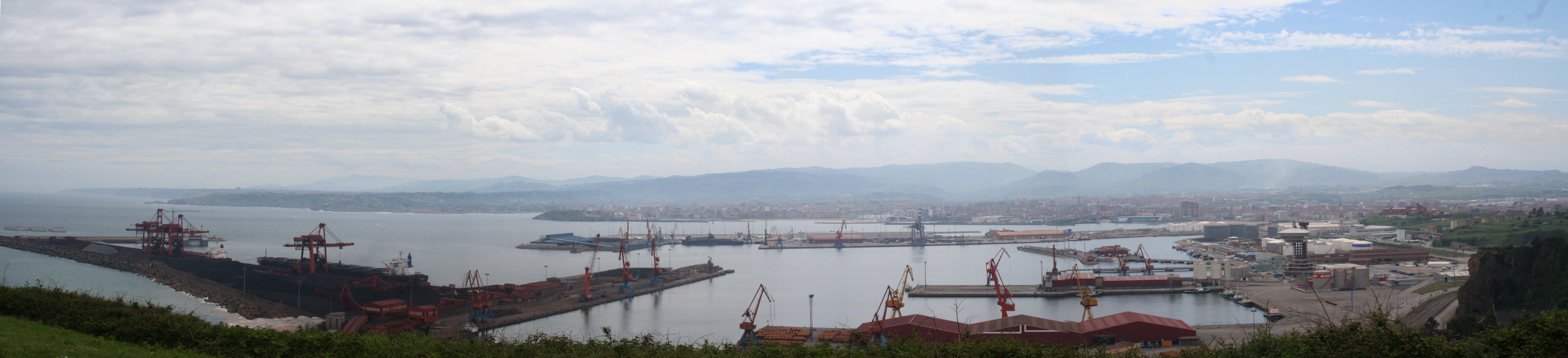
- View of the Port of Gijón from the Campa torres

Location
- Country: Spain
- Location: Gijón, Asturias
- Coordinates: 43°33′N 5°41′W
- UN/LOCODE: ESMUS

Details
- Opened: 1893

Statistics
- Annual traffic: 20,000,000 tons
- Website http://www.puertogijon.es/

Highway net and railway

El Musel is a seaport located in the north of Spain in Asturias, and in the middle point of the Cantabrian Sea coast, it is the Port of Gijón as a gateway to Europe through the A-66 and A-8 highways, allowing direct access to the west and centre of the Iberian Peninsula.

== History ==

El Musel was built as a result of the industrial revolution that began in the second half of the 19th century in Asturias, based on iron and steel manufacturing and more particularly on coal mining in the central basins of the region. Right from the start, these two industrial activities were to be promoted by bankers and native and essentially foreign experts. Alejandro Aguado, Pedro Duro Benito, Policarpo Herrero Vázquez, José Tartiere Lenegre, Luis Belaunde Costa, Numa Guilhou, Adriane Paillette, Guillermo Schulz, Luis Adaro Magro, Jerónimo Ibrán Mulá and Isidoro Clausel de Coussergues are just some of the most representative names in an extensive group of industrialists and experts who were the true originators of Asturian industrialisation. The implementation of these industries was in turn to promote the progress of trade, the growth of the main urban centres and the adaptation of new communicational routes in the shape of roads, rail and ports, introducing a new capitalist production system into the region in contrast to the traditional agricultural economy.

Since the 1840s, mining-industrial development was to reveal the deficient state of tracks and roads and the inadequacy of the Asturian port facilities. The regions rough orthography made communications with the Castilian meseta difficult by both road and rail (the Gijón-Oviedo-León line over the Pajares bridge did not begin running until 1884) and the only way of ensuring the sale of the new industrial products was by sea, leading the need for a large commercial port in the central area close to mines and factories. Back then, the Port of Gijón was a small dock left dry at low tide, completely inadequate to meet the demands of the new economic situation. Several alteration and extension projects were then presented by the likes of the French engineer Eugene Flachat (1848-1850) and by José Elduayen, (approved in 1853), the engineer to have planned the Langreo Railway that took the coal from the Nalón basin to the local docks of Gijón as of 1857, completing the communications between Sama and Gijón that began with the building of the coal road between 1838 and 1842. Another project was drafted by Pedro Antonio de Mesa in 1856, of which the part corresponding to the Santa Catalina or Lequerica sea wall was completed in 1864 to shelter vessels from storms while waiting their turn to load cargo. By the end of the century, projects were still being approved to enlarge the Bombé (now Claudio Alvargonzález street) and Santa Catalina quays that, after continuous delays, were not completed until the start of the next century.

The growing demand for port infrastructures and the lack of means from the public authorities led to the involvement of private initiative in the enlarging, building and operating of the Local Port of Gijón. Hence, in 1870 Anselmo Cifuentes was awarded the tender to build the Victoria or El Muellín quay (where the former fish market building is located) and in 1879 La Sociedad del Fomento de Gijón was constituted to build and run the quays and docks on his behalf. Moreover, the increase in traffic and fleets from the coal industry also led to the establishing of ship repair and construction shops, with the installation in 1888 of the first industrial shipyard in Gijón on Natahoyo beach in 1888, the wharf of the company Cifuentes, Stoldtz y Cía. and today home to Naval Gijón.

All of this intense activity confirmed the urgent need to kit out larger facilities to provide docks and service areas in line with the intense port traffic that existed. The shortfalls thus left the port open to new alternatives or solutions.

In 1986, the bulk carrier Castillo de Salas ran aground while anchored outside El Musel. The ship was waiting for its turn to dock in the busy port.

== Port of Gijón expansion ==

The Port of Gijón is the top dry bulk port in the Spanish ports system with an average annual traffic of more than 20 million tons the last years, 16 million of which are unloaded through the EBHISA dry bulk terminal. It is sixth in the general ranking of Spanish ports and the fourth in benefits. Designed in 1992 to unload a maximum of 12 million tons, has improved its unloading facilities and quays to deal with up to 17 million tons a year, although with occupancy indexes above that advised and with a vessel draught limit of 18 metres, which is detrimental to the service provided and a lack of competitiveness in relation to other ports.

The forecast for iron ore and coal traffic at the Port of Gijón by the year 2010 stands at 20 million tons, notably exceeding the capacity of the present terminal.

Enlarging the Port of Gijón will allow for modern, new facilities capable of meeting the needs of its customers, adapting to future demand and serving the modernisation of Asturian industry.

The actual expansion project of the Port of Gijón consists of constructing a new breakwater that, starting from Cape Torres and running for a total length of 3,834 metres along three differently structured alignments, was to form a wharf containing 140 Ha of sheltered waters. It also includes the construction of a quay located to the north of the wharf that measured 1,250 metres in length with draughts ranging between 23 and 27 metres and a width of over 400 m to allow for the simultaneous berthing of three bulk carriers of 230,000 tonnes deadweight (DWT) and 20 metres of draught. The inner slopes located to the West and South of the wharf complete the backfill protection, with a length of 1,732 m to give a total surface area of 145 Ha with land entirely reclaimed from the sea.

The new dry bulk terminal to be established in these facilities will have an unload capacity of over 25 million tons and a 60 Ha storage area to allow for the storing of up to 2 million tons of iron ore and coal.

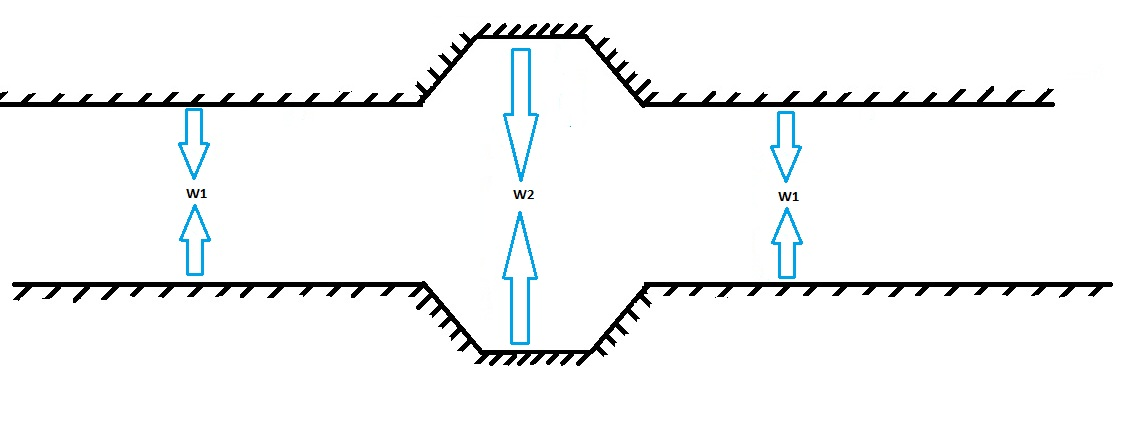
Expansion project

Type Cross sections

Situation foreseen for 2008

== Investments underway ==
=== New Aboño Musel connection ===
This investment was started due to the considerable increase in traffic between the Marcelino quay bulk terminal and the storage area concession on the Aboño quay level through the present tunnel that does no meet the appropriate conditions due to its sections, access slopes and complicated layout.

The new track starts where the Norte Dock meets Cape Torres and includes a 390m long tunnel before running parallel to the Cape slope along the Aboño quay level to reach the current road.

This track will be eminently for use by the port and, where applicable, will also allow for access to the port expansion work, separating any local traffic that may continue to use the present tunnel.

=== Aboño Quay Level Enlargement ===
This involves the provision of an 85,000 m2 area next to the northern side of the current quay level, moving the enclosure around 220 m and extending the channelling of the estuary. The enclosures will be 240m along the aforementioned extension and 430m west-east to reach the rock wall of Cape Torres.

These containment walls will be made up of different sections according to the stretch, with a paving core and 50 to 4,000 kg layers of riprap and blocks of 15 to 80 t. A concrete containing wall will be built with a similar mass to the current one.

Given the extensive experience of this Port Authority in the recovery of blocks, the work is to be carried out using almost all existing blocks and containing walls, which will involve a thorough study of the process to dismantle the present dock and its transferral to the new one to ensure it is protected at all times and to ensure that the fewest risks possible are taken with regard to the present facilities.

=== La Osa Quay Enlargement (investment underway) ===
The La Osa quays take their name from the sandbank of the same name on which the Levante dock was built, which protects the port from north-easterly storms. The Levante dock runs over the La Osa and La Figar sandbanks and gave its name to the most ambitious project of the Port of Gijón in the 20th century and that formed the El Musel we know today.

This dock, the building of which began in 1964, together with its breakwater, has become absorbed by the La Osa Quays Enlargement project except for its initial section, reclaiming 260,000 m^{2} (2,798,617 sq ft) from the sea and protected by a sloping dock measuring around 1,500 m (4,921 ft). in length and with variable sections.

The project consists of two independent actions: A barrage and a surface area enlarging the La Osa Quays and additional Backfill of the La Osa Quays, the backfill being obtained from the dredging of sand from the port entrance.

The total budget amounts to 38,000,000 euros.
