= Tenerife South Airport =

International airport serving Tenerife, Canary Islands, Spain

Tenerife South Airport Aeropuerto de Tenerife Sur

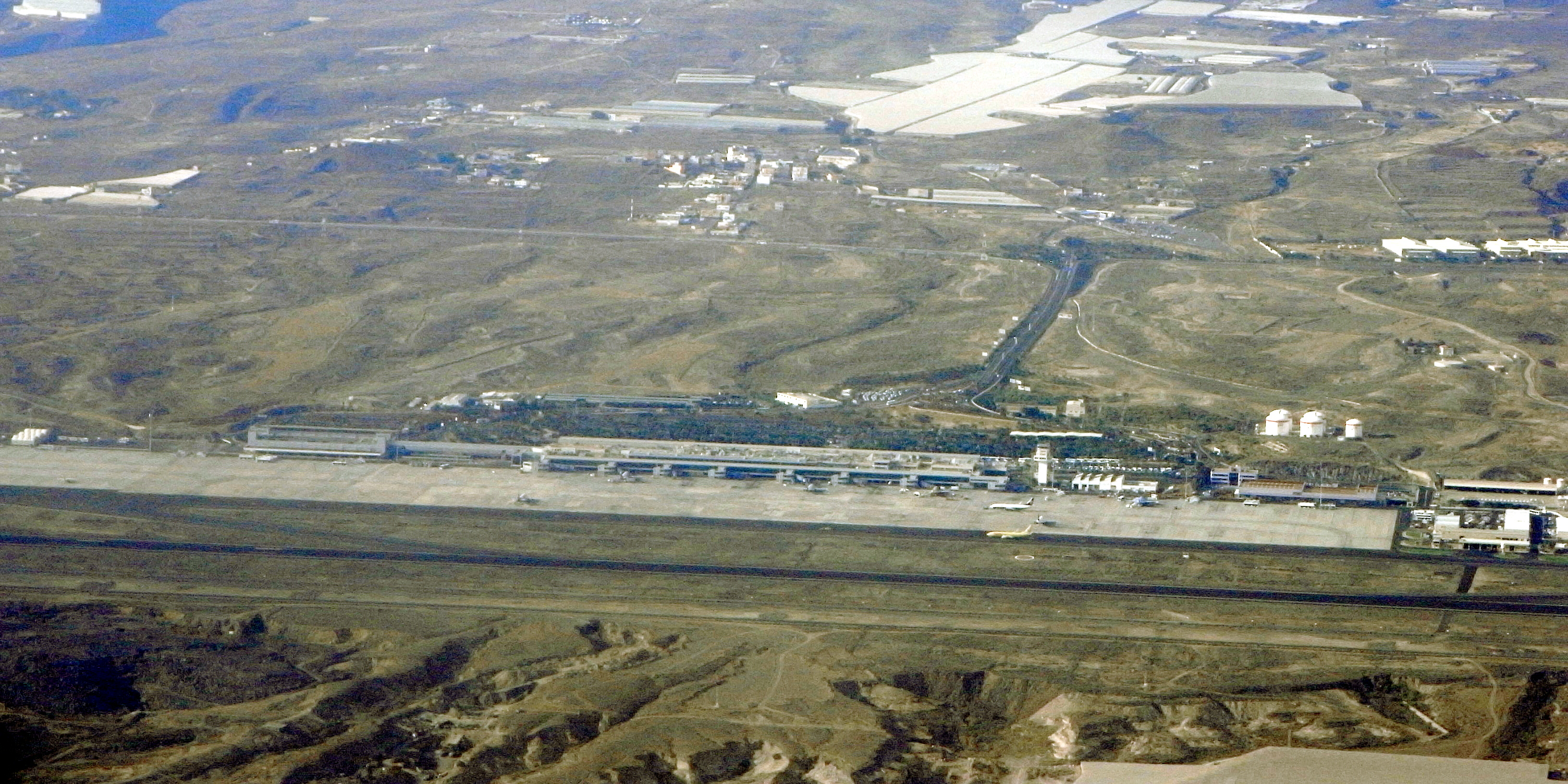
- IATA: TFS; ICAO: GCTS

Summary
- Airport type: Public
- Owner/Operator: AENA
- Serves: Tenerife South
- Location: Granadilla de Abona
- Opened: 1978
- Operating base for: Ryanair
- Built: 1973
- Elevation AMSL: 64 m (210 ft)
- Coordinates: 28°02′40″N 016°34′21″W
- Website: Official website

Map
- Location within Spain

Runways
Direction	Length		Surface
Direction	m	ft	Surface
07/25	3,200	10,498	Asphalt

Statistics (2025)
- Passengers: 13,969,678
- Passenger change 24-25: ▲1.7%
- Movements: 70,277
- Movements change 18-19: ▲0.5%
- Cargo (t): 2,188
- Sources: Passenger Traffic, AENA; Spanish AIP, AENA

Tenerife South Airport (IATA: TFS, ICAO: GCTS), also known as Tenerife South–Reina Sofía Airport, is the larger of the two international airports located on the island of Tenerife (the other being Tenerife North Airport) and the second busiest in the Canary Islands (after Gran Canaria Airport).

It is located in the municipality of Granadilla de Abona and handled over 11 million passengers in 2018. Combined with Tenerife North Airport, the island gathers the highest passenger movement of all the Canary Islands, with 12,248,673 passengers, surpassing Gran Canaria Airport.

== History ==
In the late 1960s, the island authorities of Tenerife found the need for a second airport at a new location, because the existing airport (then called "Los Rodeos Airport"), now known as Tenerife North–Ciudad de La Laguna Airport, did not meet technical requirements due to adverse weather conditions, especially low visibility in foggy conditions; this was exemplified by the events of what became the deadliest aviation accident in history, when in 1977, two Boeing 747s collided on the runway at Los Rodeos, killing 583 people, in part, due to very low visibility.

Only 20 months later, with the disaster still fresh in people's minds, the new airport was inaugurated on 6 November 1978, by Queen Sofía of Spain, to whom the airport is dedicated. The first flight was an Iberia flight IB187 from Lanzarote, which was operated by a McDonnell Douglas DC-9 landing at 10:17. The airport was constructed close to the Tomás Zerolo airfield, which closed when TFS opened.

In June 1980, Viasa inaugurated flights to Caracas. The link served the large proportion of the Canarian diaspora that resided in Venezuela. The airline ceased operations in 1997, after which Avensa started plying the route. Due to financial problems, Avensa later let Santa Bárbara Airlines take over its flights to Spain and then began code-sharing on them. In October 2002, Santa Bárbara commenced service to Reina Sofía Airport using a McDonnell Douglas DC-10. It switched to Tenerife North Airport four months later.

With the launch of service in late 2026, Air Canada will offer the only service to North America. United Airlines provided thrice weekly-service to Tenerife from Newark between June 2022 and May 2025.

== Terminal ==
Tenerife South consists of one three-storey passenger terminal in a classic brick style. The main level, Floor 0, contains all check-in and service counters, the departures waiting areas as well as the arrivals and main baggage reclaim. The departures area features 40 boarding gates of which ten are equipped with jetbridges. While the upper floor 1 contains office space and transit corridors, the basement level -1 features additional luggage belts.

== Airlines and destinations ==
The following airlines operate regular scheduled and charter flights at Tenerife South Airport:

Airlines	Destinations
Aer Lingus	Dublin; Seasonal: Cork
Air Canada	Montréal–Trudeau; Seasonal: Toronto–Pearson
Air France	Seasonal: Paris–Charles de Gaulle
Air Serbia	Belgrade
airBaltic	Seasonal: Groningen (begins 29 October 2026), Riga Tallinn, Vilnius
Animawings	Seasonal: Timișoara
Austrian Airlines	Vienna
Binter Canarias	Gran Canaria; Seasonal: Funchal
British Airways	London–Gatwick, London–Heathrow
Brussels Airlines	Brussels
Condor	Düsseldorf, Frankfurt, Hamburg, Munich; Seasonal: Stuttgart
Corendon Airlines Europe	Cologne/Bonn, Düsseldorf, Hannover
Discover Airlines	Frankfurt, Munich
easyJet	Basel/Mulhouse, Belfast–International, Berlin, Birmingham, Bordeaux, Bristol, Edinburgh, Geneva, Liverpool, London–Gatwick, London–Luton, London–Southend, Lyon, Manchester, Milan–Malpensa, Nantes, Paris–Charles de Gaulle, Newcastle upon Tyne; Seasonal: Amsterdam, Glasgow, Milan–Linate, Nice
Edelweiss Air	Zurich
Eurowings	Cologne/Bonn, Düsseldorf; Seasonal: Berlin, Graz, Hamburg, Hannover, Prague, Salzburg, Stuttgart
Finnair	Seasonal: Helsinki
Icelandair	Reykjavík–Keflavík; Seasonal: Akureyri
Jet2.com	Belfast–International, Birmingham, Bournemouth, Bristol, East Midlands, Edinburgh, Glasgow, Leeds/Bradford, Liverpool, London–Gatwick, London–Luton, London–Stansted, Manchester, Newcastle upon Tyne
LOT Polish Airlines	Seasonal: Warsaw–Chopin
Luxair	Luxembourg
Marabu	Cologne/Bonn, Hamburg
Neos	Bologna; Seasonal: Milan–Malpensa, Verona
Norwegian Air Shuttle	Copenhagen, Oslo; Seasonal: Aalborg, Bergen, Helsinki, Stavanger, Stockholm–Arlanda
Royal Air Maroc	Casablanca
Ryanair	Agadir, Bergamo, Berlin, Birmingham, Bologna, Bournemouth, Bristol, Budapest, Charleroi, Cardiff, Cologne/Bonn, Dublin, East Midlands, Edinburgh, Eindhoven, Glasgow–Prestwick, Knock, Kraków, Leeds/Bradford, Liverpool, London–Luton, London–Stansted, Madrid, Málaga, Manchester, Marseille, Milan–Malpensa, Naples, Newcastle upon Tyne, Rome–Fiumicino, Santiago de Compostela, Seville, Shannon, Treviso, Valencia, Vienna, Warsaw–Modlin; Seasonal: Beauvais, Hahn, Karlsruhe/Baden-Baden, Marrakesh, Memmingen, Porto, Toulouse, Weeze
Scandinavian Airlines	Seasonal: Copenhagen, Oslo, Stockholm–Arlanda
Smartwings	Prague; Seasonal charter: Isle of Man, Jersey, Warsaw-Chopin
Sunclass Airlines	Seasonal charter: Copenhagen, Oslo
Sundair	Seasonal: Münster/Osnabrück
TAP Air Portugal	Lisbon
Transavia	Amsterdam, Brussels, Eindhoven, Rotterdam/The Hague
TUI Airways	Birmingham, Bournemouth, Bristol, Cardiff, Dublin, East Midlands, Exeter, Glasgow, London–Gatwick, Manchester, Newcastle upon Tyne, Norwich; Seasonal: Aberdeen, Belfast–International, London–Stansted
TUI fly Belgium	Antwerp (ends 25 March 2027), Brussels, Ostend/Bruges
TUI fly Deutschland	Düsseldorf, Frankfurt, Hannover, Munich, Stuttgart
TUI fly Netherlands	Amsterdam, Eindhoven, Rotterdam/The Hague
Volotea	Asturias, Bilbao, Nantes; Seasonal: Brest, Lille, Montpellier (begins 8 November 2026)
Vueling	Paris–Orly
Wizz Air	Bucharest–Otopeni, Budapest, Gdańsk, Katowice, Milan–Malpensa, Rome–Fiumicino, Venice, Warsaw–Chopin

== Statistics ==
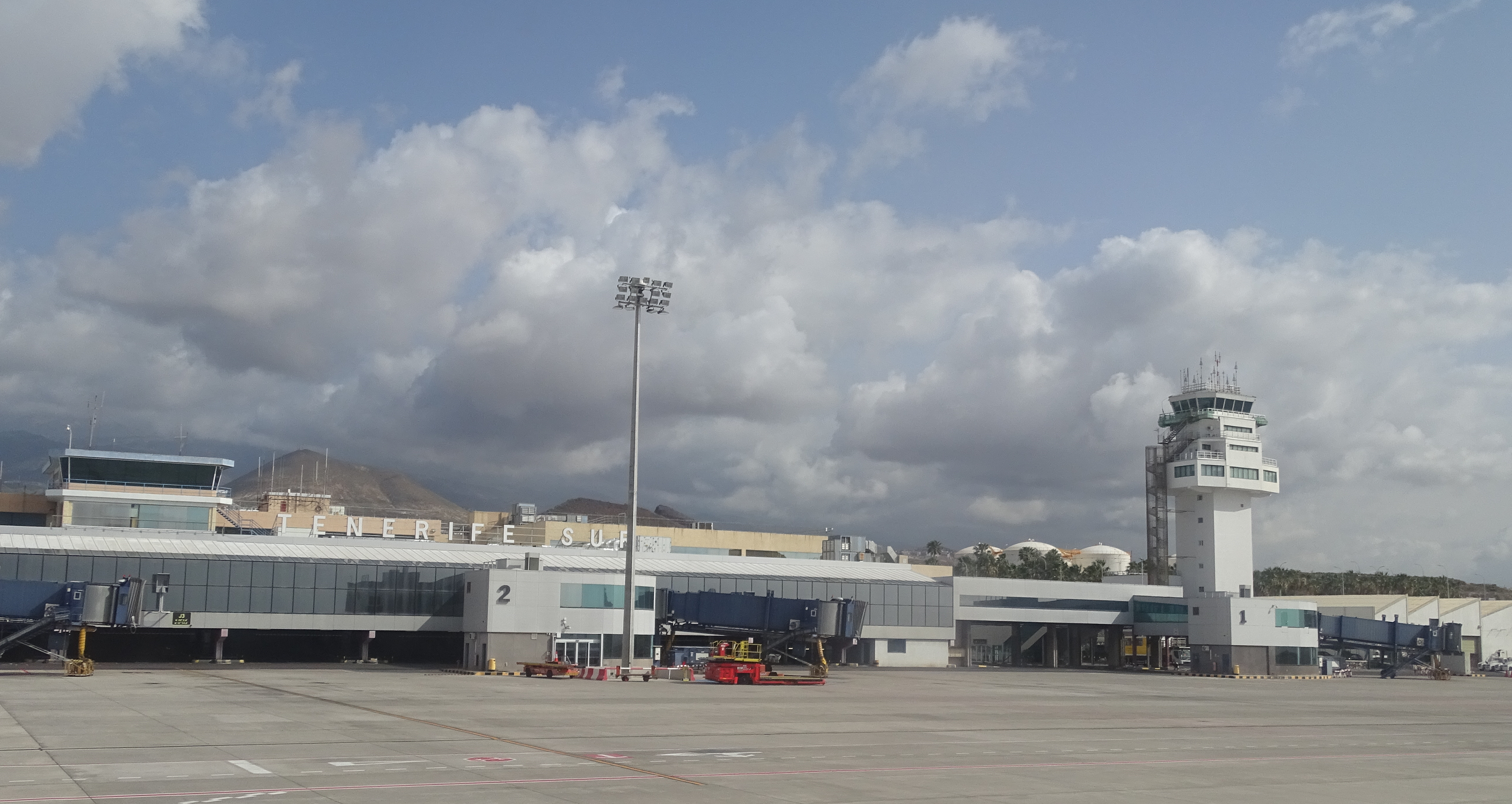
Terminal exterior

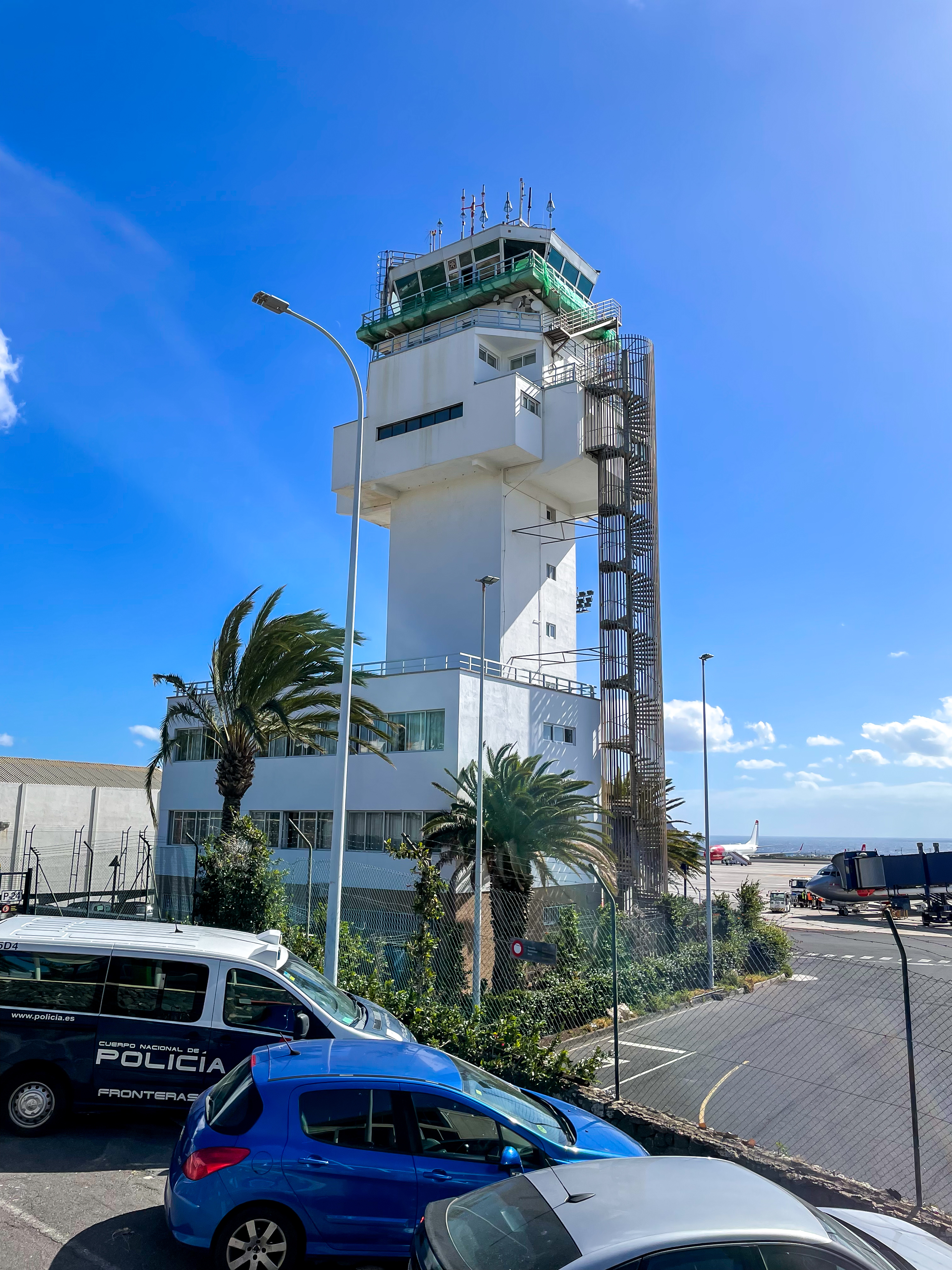
Control tower

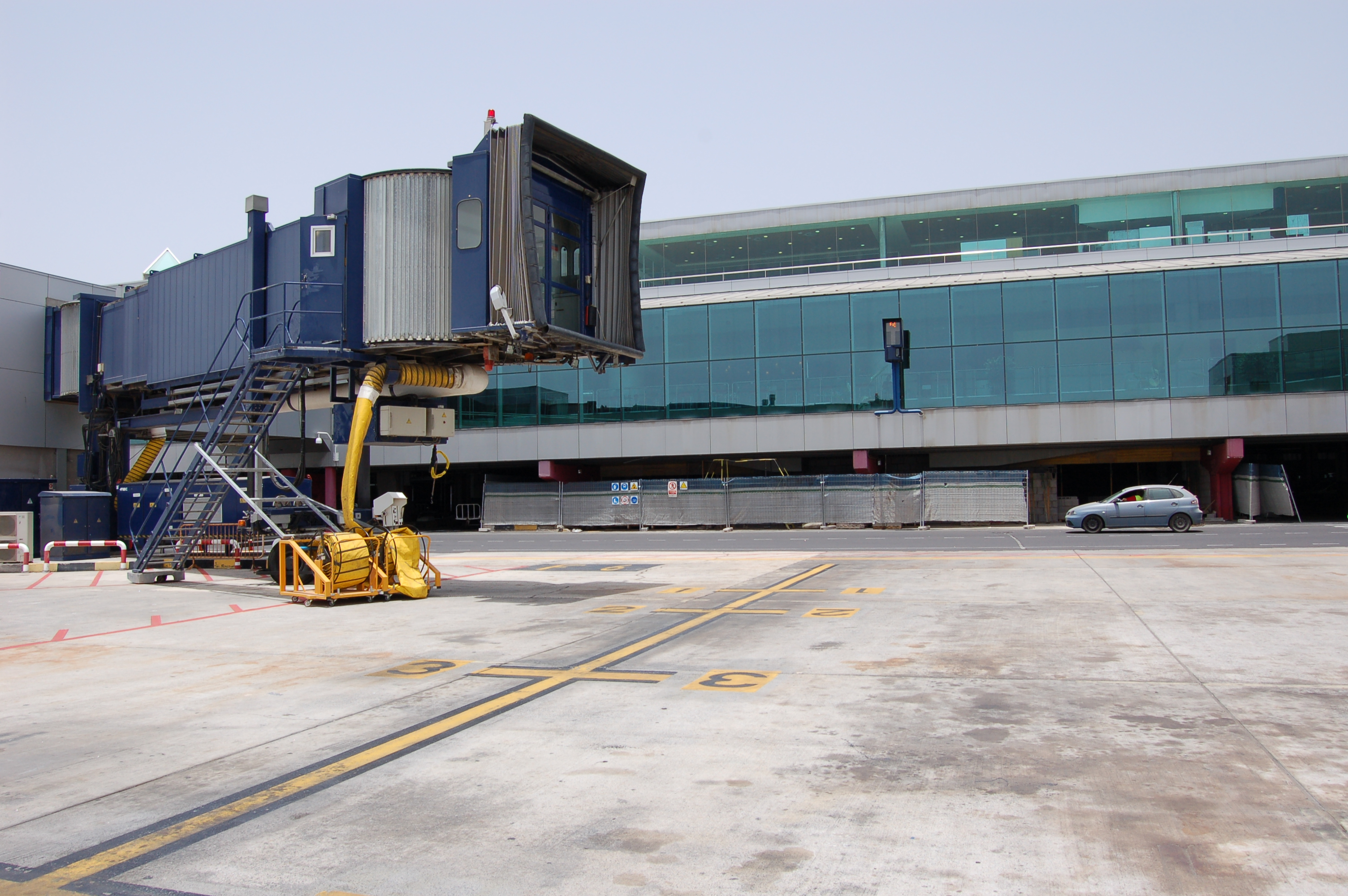
Apron view

=== Passengers ===
	Passengers	Aircraft movements	Cargo (tonnes)
2000	9,111,065	62,096	12,019
2001	9,111,065	61,055	11,469
2002	8,980,465	63,527	10,769
2003	8,852,878	62,506	8,775
2004	8,632,178	62,824	9,218
2005	8,631,923	63,649	9,770
2006	8,845,668	65,774	9,414
2007	8,639,341	65,036	9,168
2008	8,251,989	60,779	8,567
2009	7,108,073	49,779	5,371
2010	7,359,150	51,858	4,293
2011	8,656,487	58,093	4,480
2012	8,530,729	56,210	3,906
2013	8,701,983	55,987	3,395
2014	9,176,274	60,290	3,376
2015	9,117,514	58,462	2,844
2016	10,472,713	65,882	2,809
2017	11,248,882	69,846	2,797
2018	11,042,481	69,910	2,483
2019	11,168,506	70,277	2,188
Source: Aena Statistics

=== Busiest routes ===
Busiest European routes from TFS (2023)
Rank	Destination	Passengers	Change 2021/22
1	Manchester	963,741	▲16%
2	London-Gatwick	712,288	▲24%
3	London-Stansted	519,686	▲15%
4	Birmingham	393,055	▲11%
5	Bristol	369,394	▲26%
6	East Midlands	321,549	▲16%
7	Edinburgh	320,816	▲12%
8	Brussels	311,785	▲14%
9	Dublin	285,481	▲20%
10	Düsseldorf	284,990	▲16%
11	Newcastle	270,219	▲12%
12	Frankfurt	268,081	▲8%
13	Amsterdam	261,813	▼2%
14	Glasgow	244,089	▲11%
15	Leeds/Bradford	232,589	▲20%
16	Milan-Malpensa	199,739	▼8%
17	London-Luton	173,764	▼19%
18	Vienna	169,753	▲29%
19	Berlin	165,466	▲5%
20	Munich	162,859	▲12%
Source: Estadísticas de tráfico aereo

Busiest domestic routes from TFS (2023)
Rank	Destination	Passengers	Change 2021/22
1	Madrid	417,917	▲10%
2	Gran Canaria	204,484	▲15%
3	Santiago de Compostela	140,903	▲16%
4	Barcelona	74,668	▲15%
5	Seville	63,714	▲20%
6	Lanzarote	59,698	▲57%
7	La Palma	55,257	▲99%
8	Valencia	41,304	▲17%
9	Málaga	37,369	▼1%
10	Asturias	16,429	▼21%
Source: Estadísticas de tráfico aereo

== Ground transport ==
=== Car rental ===
Several car rental companies authorized by AENA operate at Tenerife South Airport. These companies are located in the arrivals halls for both domestic and international flights. There are other car rental companies operating outside the airport, but they are not authorized by AENA.
