= Castrillón =

- Municipality
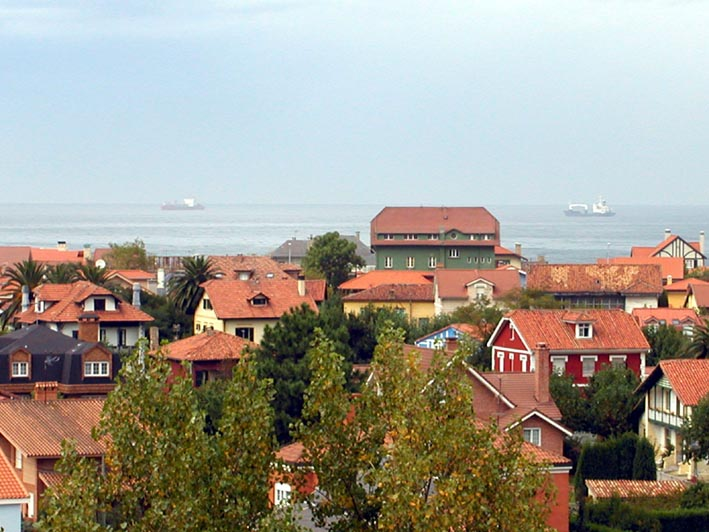
- Streets in Salinas

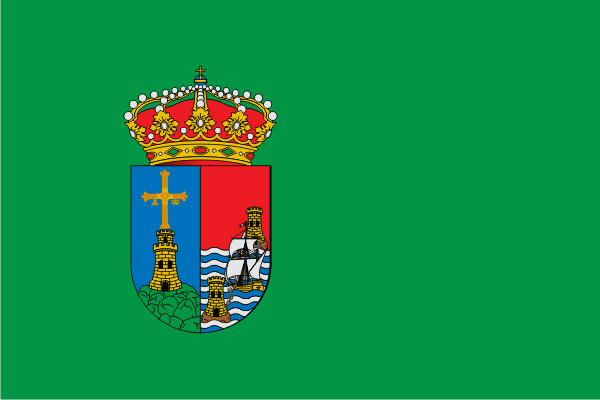
- Flag Coat of arms

- Location of Castrillón

- Location in Spain Castrillón (Spain)
- Coordinates: 43°33′N 5°58′W
- Country: Spain
- Autonomous community: Asturias
- Province: Asturias
- Comarca: Avilés
- Capital: Piedrasblancas

Government
  - Alcalde: Ángela Vallina (IU)

Area
  - Total: 55.34 km^{2} (21.37 sq mi)
- Elevation: 434 m (1,424 ft)

Population (2025-01-01)
  - Total: 21,998
  - Density: 397.5/km^{2} (1,030/sq mi)
- Demonym: Castrillonense
- Time zone: UTC+1 (CET)
  - Summer (DST): UTC+2 (CEST)
- Postal code: 33450, 33405 (Salinas, Raices y Coto Carcedo) y 33456-33459
- Official language(s): Asturian
- Website: Official website

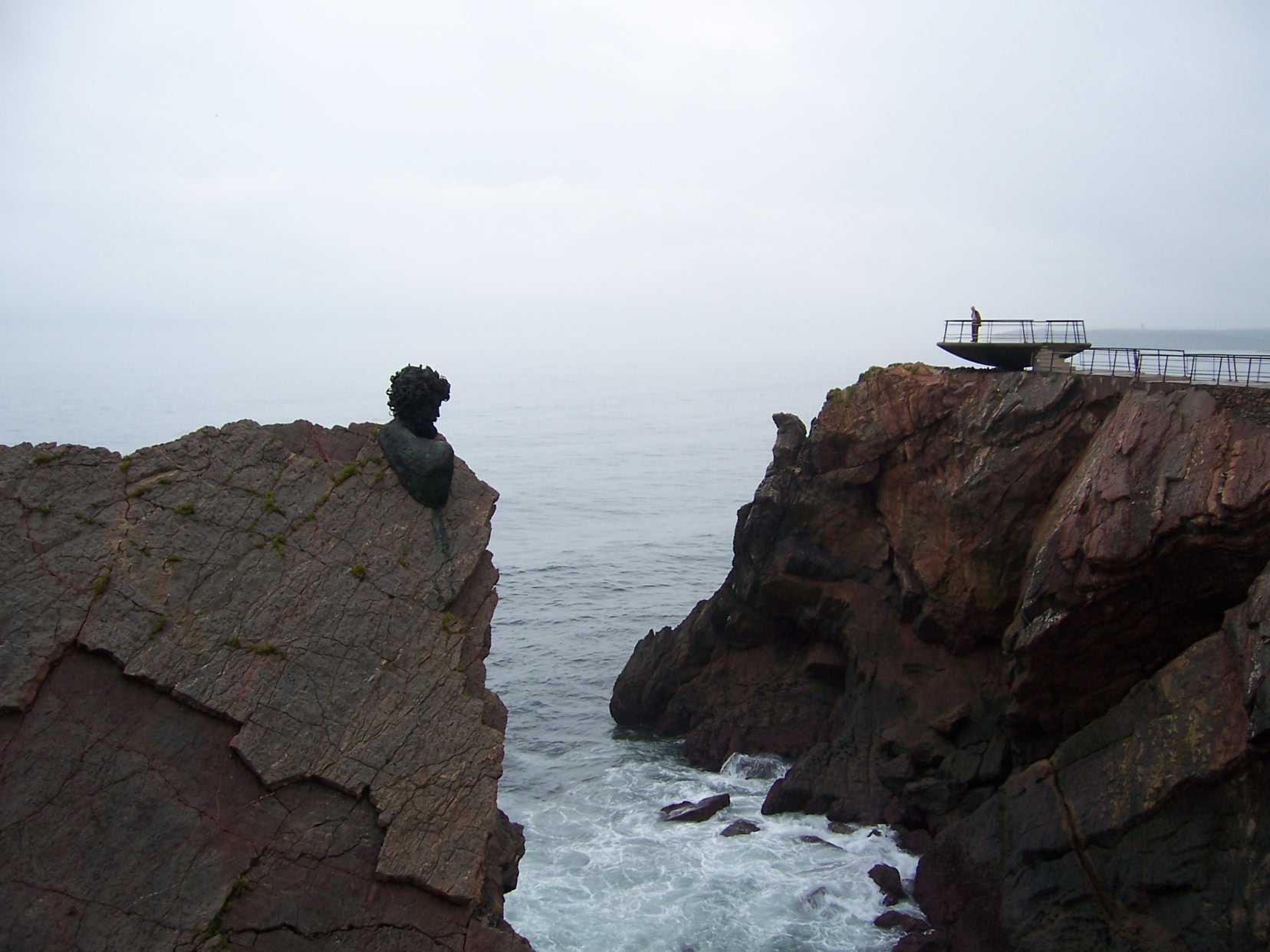
Philippe Cousteau Anchor Museum at Salinas. Tribute to Philippe Cousteau.

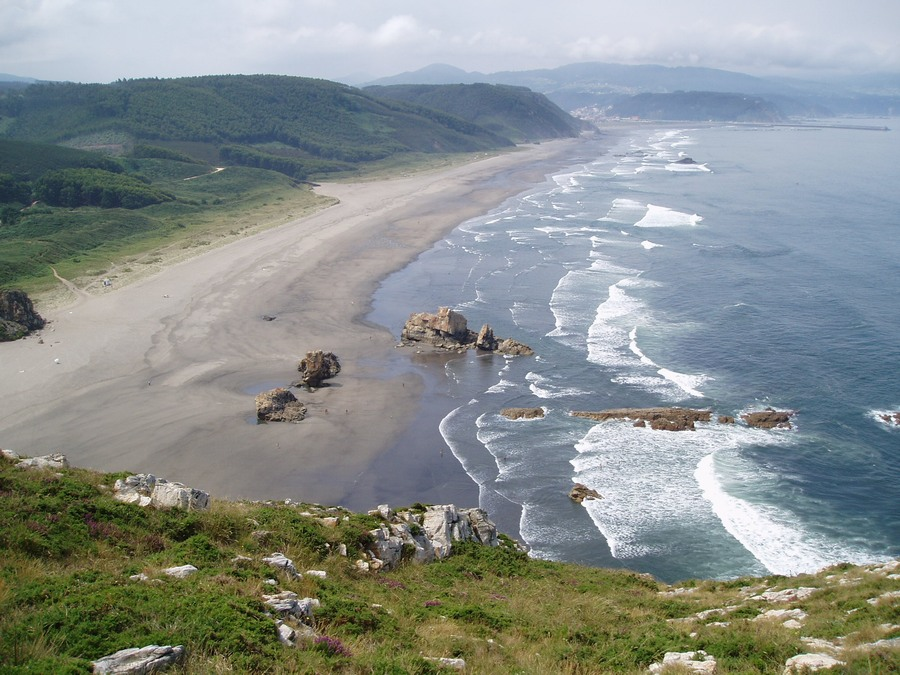
Playón de Bayas (Bayas beach).

Castrillón is a municipality in Asturias, located on the central coast of Spain. It has an area of 56.70 km^{2} and had a population of 22,361 inhabitants (in 2005). The most important population centres are the capital Piedrasblancas, Salinas, and Raíces.

Asturias Airport is located in Castrillón. The airport is located in Anzu, parish of Santiagu'l Monte, municipality of Castrillón, 15 km from Avilés, 40 km from Gijón and 47 km from the regional capital, Oviedo.

== Geography ==
Situated on the littoral plain, the county is one of the flattest areas in Asturias. Its coast is formed by a series of beaches and cliffs. For this reason, the county is known as "the county of the 7 beaches", even though there are more than seven beaches along its long coastline.

Inland, the area is characterized by the smoothness of the landscape, mainly formed by fertile valleys with a small river network that crosses the county. The altitude increases steadily towards the Southwest, with the peak in the Alto del Marqués (438 m).

== Parishes ==
Castrillón has eight parishes (administrative divisions):

- Bayas
- Samartín de L'Aspra
- Naveces
- Piarnu
- Samiguel de Quiloñu
- Salinas
- Santa María del Mar / El Puertu
- Santiagu'l Monte

Castrillón contains seven locations that do not belong to any parish. This political division in unique in Asturias. The seven are six localities (El Cotu Carcéu, La Cruz d'Illes, La Llaguna, Miranda, Raíces Nuevo/La Fundación and San Xuan) and the village of San Cristoba.

== Climate ==
Its oceanic climate means that there is little temperature variation. It has an annual average temperature of 13 °C, a moderate summer and mild winter with frequent rain. In this way it is similar to adjacent regions.

== History ==
The first evidence of a human presence in Castrillón is in Astur settlements from the Celtic and Roman periods. In Peñarrey, an altar with an inscription has been found, together with some pottery. There are also some silver coins in Samiguel de Quiloñu and some other places. The earliest known written documents found date from the 9th century. Castrillón appears named as Castilione in the Liber Testamentorum of the Cathedral of Oviedo, sourced as a copy of a document from 857 AD. In that period Castrillón was part of the Alfoz of Gozón (later on it would be part of the Alfoz of Avilés); this is the origin of the first coat of arms of the county. In these documents, and others from the 10th century, there are references to the various contributions of the Kings to the Church of Oviedo, like the one dated on 921 where the donations from Ordoño II, including the Sancti Saluatoris de Petris Albis church (San Salvador de Piedras Blancas).

Castiellu de Gauzón, dating to the 7th century, is also widely mentioned in those documents. This emblematic Asturian fortress was located in the Peñón de Raíces (Rock of Raices). This place was used as a prison for the rebels, and as a protection for the estuary of Avilés against the attacks of the Normans. According to tradition and written legend, the Cruz de la Victoria (Victory Cross) was forged there. Under the protection of the castle, there was a monastery that gave shelter to the orders of Santiago, San Francisco and La Merced. The inhabitants still use the bulrush and some architectonic elements in the houses built in the lands where the old monastery was.

The salt industry was very important during the Early Middle Ages, in the areas of Bayas, Naveces and Santa María del Mar.

When the Real Compañía de Minas (Royal Mining Company) arrived in 1833, they began working the coal reef of Arnao, which became the first submarine mine in Spain. It was ultimately abandoned because of the filtration of sea water through its domes. At Arnao beach you can still see the derrick used for extraction, covered with zinc panels.

The Real Compañía de Minas also worked in the foundry and elaboration of zinc and zinc byproducts. There are factories in Arnáu and San Xuan. The construction of houses for their employees was the beginning of the current population centres of San Xuan, Arnáu, and Salinas. At these places there are some interesting examples of 20th-century architecture.

During the early 20th Century, many Asturian zinc workers from Arnáu immigrated to West Virginia to work in zinc smelters there, specifically towns like Spelter (outside Clarksburg, WV) and Moundsville. At one point, there were so many Asturian immigrants from the Castrillón area to West Virginia that there was a Spanish consulate in Clarksburg.

== Politics ==
The current mayor is Yasmina Triguero Estévez (IU-IX).

Municipal elections
Party/List	1979	1983	1987	1991	1995	1999	2003	2007	2011	2015
CD / AP / PP	1	6	6	6	10	9	9	9	6	6
PCE / IU-BA	3	2	4	5	5	6	6	7	8	8
FSA-PSOE	6	9	7	8	6	6	6	5	3	3
CSP										2
C's										1
FAC									4	1
UCD / CDS	4	-	4	2						
Independents	3									
Total	17	17	21	21	21	21	21	21	21	21

== See also ==
- List of municipalities in Asturias
