= Philippe Cousteau Anchor Museum =

Maritime museum in Salinas, Asturias, Spain

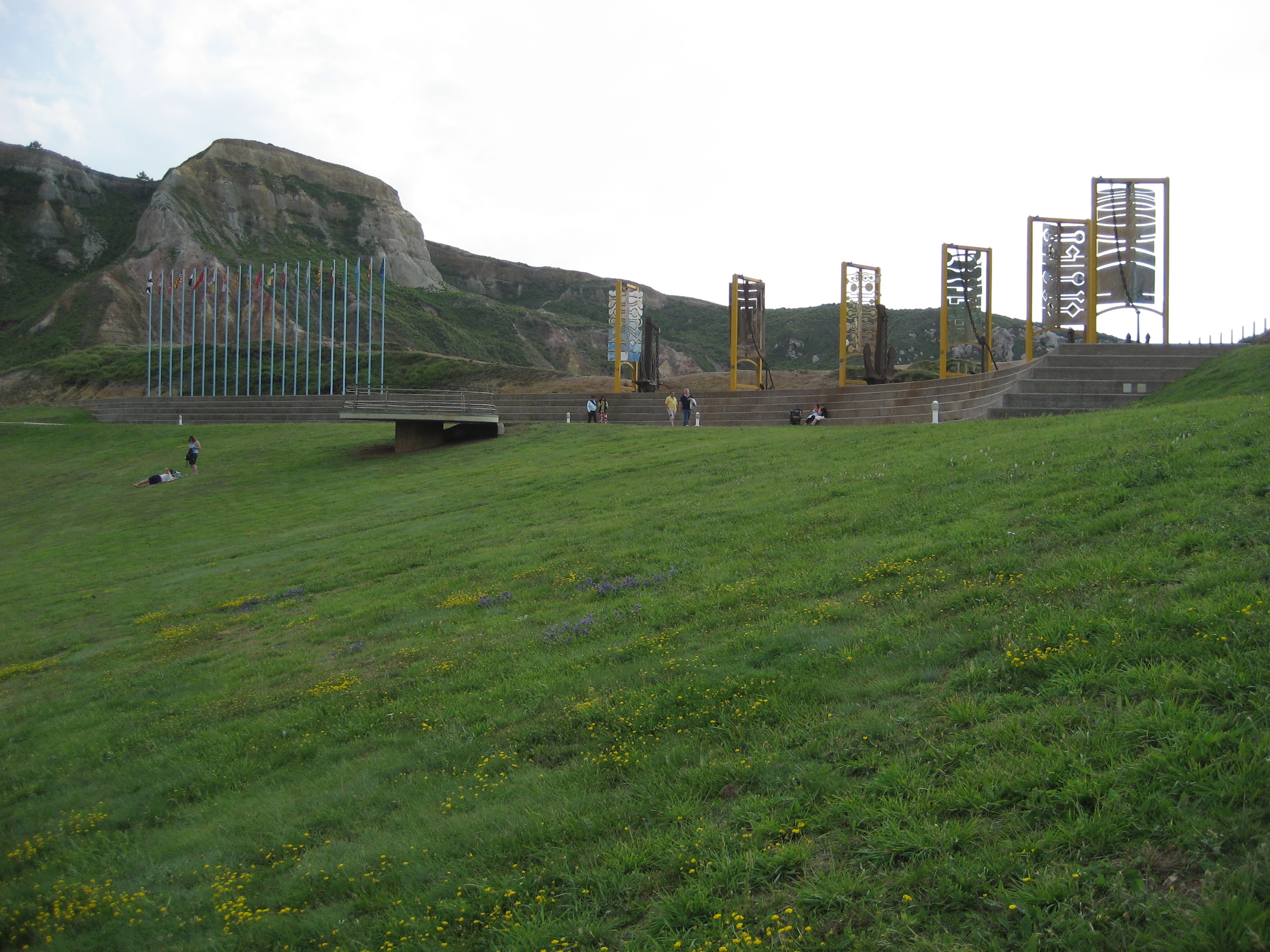
- Location: Plaza de Europa, Nº1 33450 Piedras Blancas, Castrillón, Asturias, Spain
- Coordinates: 43.579831°N 5.968753°W
- Website: www.museodeanclas.es

The Philippe Cousteau Anchor Museum (Spanish: Museo de Anclas Philippe Cousteau) is located in Salinas, a town within the Castrillón municipality of Asturias, Spain. It is names after Philippe Cousteau. It is reached by the N-632.

The open-air museum is situated on La Peñona peninsula at one end of the beach near the Arnao tunnel. It includes sails and deck anchors, along with a large, ceramic mural. The featured bust of Philippe Cousteau is the work of sculptor Vicente Menendez-Santarúa Prendes.

One of the anchors is from the bulk carrier Castillo de Salas that ran aground over rocks near Gijón in 1986.
