= Samartín de L'Aspra =

- Parish
- Location within Spain
- Coordinates: 43.566667°N 5.983333°W
- Country: Spain
- Autonomous community: Asturias
- Province: Asturias
- Municipality: Castrillón

Samartín de L'Aspra (Spanish: Laspra) is one of the eight parishes in Castrillón, a municipality within the province and autonomous community of Asturias, in northern Spain.

The main town of the parish is Piedrasblancas, the capital of the municipality.

== Villages ==
- Arnáu
- Campiellu
- La Castañalona
- Piedrasblancas
- Las Piñeras
- El Pontón
- Quiloñu
- La Quinta'l Misteriu
- Samartín
- Varboniel
- Vegarrozadas
- Villar
