= Samiguel de Quiloñu =

- Parish
- Location within Spain
- Coordinates: 43.55°N 5.966667°W
- Country: Spain
- Autonomous community: Asturias
- Province: Asturias
- Municipality: Castrillón

Samiguel de Quiloñu (Spanish: Quiloño) is one of eight parishes (administrative divisions) in Castrillón, a municipality within the province and autonomous community of Asturias, in northern Spain.

== Villages ==
- Las Bárzanas
- La Braña
- El Castru
- Las Curuxas
- Llodares
- Peñarréi
- La Peruyera
- La Plata
- La Quiona
- La Ramera de Baxu
- Samiguel
- El Ventorrillu
