= Piarnu (Castrillón) =

- Parish
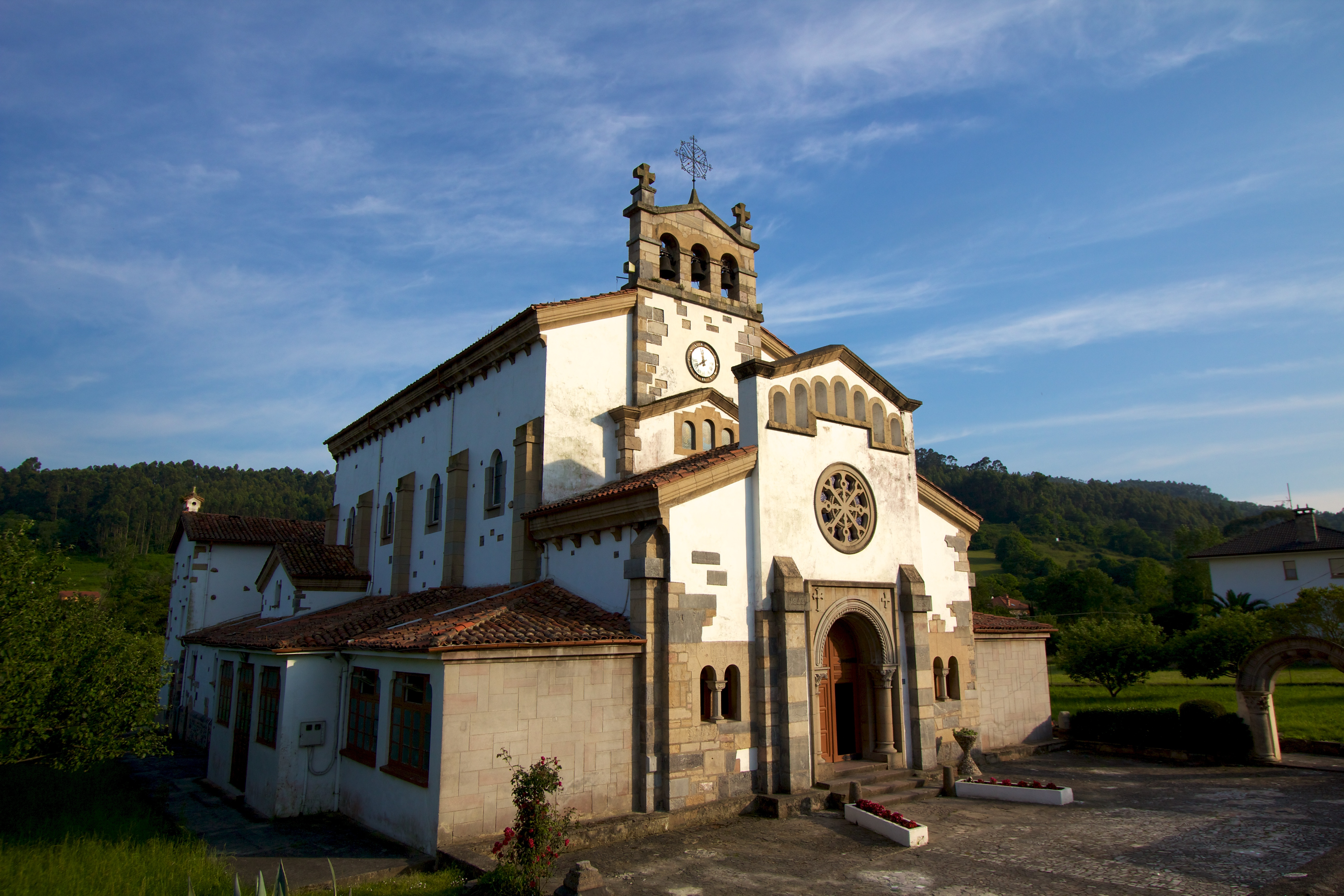
- San Cipriano church

- Location within Spain
- Coordinates: 43.533333°N 5.966667°W
- Country: Spain
- Autonomous community: Asturias
- Province: Asturias
- Municipality: Castrillón

Piarnu (Spanish: Pillarno) is one of eight parishes (administrative divisions) in Castrillón, a municipality within the province and autonomous community of Asturias, in northern Spain.

The population is 791 (INE 2005).

== Villages ==
- L'Alvarina
- Buxande
- La Cangueta
- El Cascayu
- La Corredoria
- El Cuadru
- La Llaguna
- La Machuquera
- Moire
- Orbón
- Pipe
- Pulide
- La Ramera de Riba
- Romadoriu
- La Salguera
- Teboyas
