= Santiagu'l Monte =

- Parish
- Location within Asturias Location within Spain
- Coordinates: 43°33′02″N 6°01′32″W
- Country: Spain
- Autonomous community: Asturias
- Province: Asturias
- Municipality: Castrillón

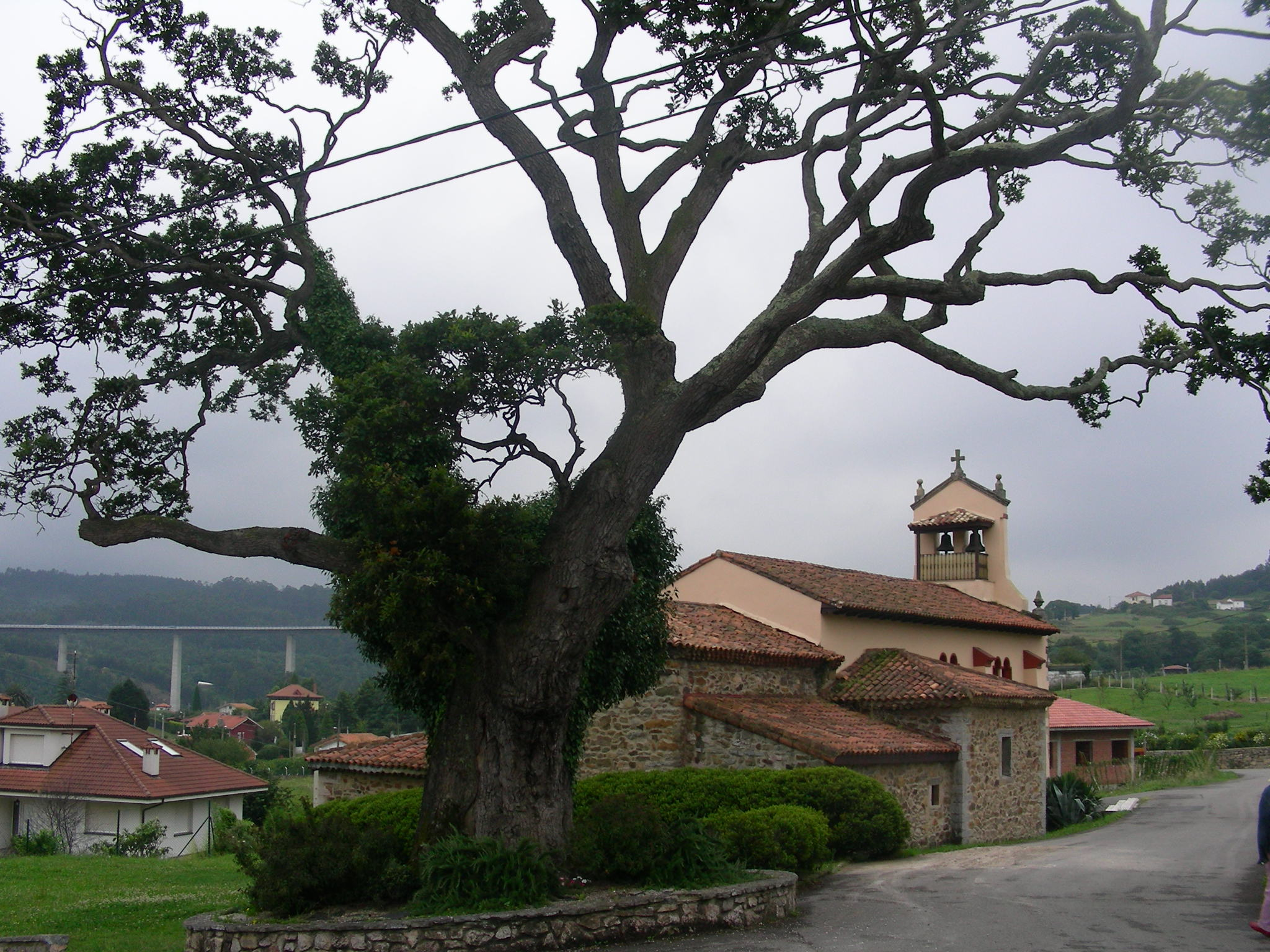
church of Santiago de los Montes

Santiagu'l Monte (Spanish: Santiago del Monte) is one of eight parishes (administrative divisions) in Castrillón, a municipality within the province and autonomous community of Asturias, in northern Spain.

The parish has a population of 209 (INE 2004).

== Villages ==
- L'Águila
- Anzu
- La Banda
- La Cabaña
- La Lloba
- La Muriégana
- Panizales
- El Monte
- L'Umeiru
