= Santa María del Mar (Castrillón) =

Santa María del Mar / El Puertu
- Parish
- Location within Spain
- Coordinates: 43.583333°N 5.983333°W
- Country: Spain
- Autonomous community: Asturias
- Province: Asturias
- Municipality: Castrillón

Santa María del Mar (Asturian: El Puertu; officially Santa María del Mar / El Puertu) is one of eight parishes (administrative divisions) in Castrillón, a municipality within the province and autonomous community of Asturias, in northern Spain.

== Villages ==
- Arancés
- Las Arribas
- El Barru
- Las Chabolas
- La Llonguera
- El Molín de Mata
- El Puertu
- Las Vallinas
