= Teresa Cónsul =

Asturian Benedictine nun and playwright (c. 1757–1834)

- Born: Teresa Cónsul c. 1757; Pola de Siero, Asturias, Spain
- Died: 28 September 1834; Oviedo, Asturias, Spain
- Occupations: Benedictine nun, playwright
- Writing career
- Language: Asturian, Spanish
- Genre: Entremés
- Notable work: Entremés (1789)

Teresa Cónsul (c. 1757 – 28 September 1834) was a Spanish Benedictine nun and playwright from Asturias. She is known for an entremés, or short comic play, written in Asturian and Spanish and performed at the convent of Santa María de la Vega in Oviedo in 1789. It is her only known surviving literary work. She is regarded as the earliest known woman playwright to write in Asturian.

== Life ==
Details of Cónsul's early life are limited. Convent records identify her as a native of Pola de Siero, although this may refer to the wider municipality of Siero rather than the town itself. Arias identified her parents as Juan Benito Cónsul Jove and Gertrudis Requejo y Tineo. Her brother was the painter Juan Nepomuceno Cónsul y Requejo, who maintained professional and personal connections with Gaspar Melchor de Jovellanos.

Her exact birth date has not been established. Research published by Álvaro Arias in 2026 suggests that she was born around 1757, possibly at the family's property in Villar, in the parish of San Martín, Siero.

Cónsul entered the Benedictine convent of Santa María de la Vega in Oviedo on 11 December 1785, took the religious habit on 4 January 1786, and made her profession on 10 January 1787, adopting the name Escolástica Teresa. During her religious life she held various positions within the community, including cantor, steward, mistress of novices and prioress.

She died of cholera in Oviedo on 28 September 1834, during an epidemic affecting the city. Her death and its circumstances are recorded in the convent archives.

== Literary work ==
Cónsul's only known surviving work is an entremés performed on 21 March 1789, the feast of Saint Benedict, as part of a celebration honoring the convent's abbess, Benita Merás, in the final year of her tenure. Its original title describes the occasion and the participation of the nuns of Santa María de la Vega. The play combines Asturian and Spanish and belongs to the small surviving corpus of eighteenth-century Asturian theatre. It as an early example of the relationship between language, social position and geographical origin that later became characteristic of Asturian popular theatre.

The characters include a tavernkeeper, a nun named Inés, her brother Toribio and other nuns. The tavernkeeper and Toribio speak Asturian, while Inés speaks predominantly Spanish, occasionally incorporating Asturian expressions. The other nuns speak Spanish. Humour arises partly from linguistic misunderstandings and the contrast between rural and urban characters.

Additional Asturian poems and short plays attributed to Cónsul have been lost.

== Preservation and reception ==
The existence of Cónsul's play was recorded by Máximo Fuertes Acevedo in 1885 and subsequently by other bibliographers, including Manuel Serrano y Sanz. A manuscript copy dated to 1792 was preserved among materials from the Fuertes Acevedo family library, now held by the Real Instituto de Estudios Asturianos. Swedish Romanist Åke Munthe (1859–1933) mentioned the work of Teresa Consul in 1887 in one of the earliest scientific descriptions of Asturian dialects.

In 1980, Álvaro Ruiz de la Peña published a biographical study based on Benedictine convent archives, establishing the principal dates of Cónsul's religious life and the performance of her play. The surviving text was edited and published in 1996 by Álvaro Arias Cabal for the Academia de la Llingua Asturiana, in its series Cartafueyos de lliteratura escaecida.

In 2026, the Government of Asturias dedicated the 47th Selmana de les Lletres Asturianes (Asturian Letters Week) to Cónsul and the tradition of Asturian popular theatre. The commemoration included the publication of De viva voz. Taresa Cónsul y el teatru asturianu, a collection of scholarly studies examining her biography, literary work and historical context.

== Works ==
- Entremés (1789). A bilingual Asturian–Spanish short play first performed at the convent of Santa María de la Vega in Oviedo. Edited by Álvaro Arias Cabal and published by the Academia de la Llingua Asturiana in 1996.

== Sources ==
- Arias, Álvaro (2026). "Datos pa la biografía de Taresa Cónsul (c. 1757–1834)" [Biographical Information on Teresa Cónsul (c. 1757–1834)]. In Iglesia, Laura; Díaz, Adolfo Camilo (eds.). De viva voz. Taresa Cónsul y el teatru asturianu [In Her Own Voice: Teresa Cónsul and Asturian Theatre] (in Asturian). Uviéu: Conseyería de Cultura, Política Llingüística y Deporte del Principáu d'Asturies. pp. 39–56. ISBN 979-1-388-14918-4.
- Arias, Álvaro (2026b). "Edición literaria del Entremés de Taresa Cónsul de 1789" [Literary edition of Taresa Cónsul’s "Entremés" from 1789]. In Iglesia, Laura; Díaz, Adolfo Camilo (eds.). De viva voz. Taresa Cónsul y el teatru asturianu [In Her Own Voice: Teresa Cónsul and Asturian Theatre] (in Asturian). Uviéu: Conseyería de Cultura, Política Llingüística y Deporte del Principáu d'Asturies. ISBN 979-1-388-14918-4.
- Cónsul, Teresa (1996). Arias Cabal, Álvaro (ed.). Entremés (1789) [Comic Interlude (1789)]. Cartafueyos de lliteratura escaecida (in Asturian). Vol. 11. Uviéu: Academia de la Llingua Asturiana. doi:10.5281/zenodo.14547800. ISBN 9788481680591.
- García, Noelia S. (2022). "Et in Arcadia ego. La configuración del espacio en el teatro costumbrista asturiano a través de la obra de Pachín de Melás" [Et in Arcadia ego: The Configuration of Space in Asturian Costumbrista Theatre through the Work of Pachín de Melás]. Lletres Asturianes (in Spanish) (126): 155–187. doi:10.17811/LLAA.126.2022.155-187. ISSN 0212-0534.
- "El Principado dedica la 47 Selmana de les Lletres Asturianes a Taresa Cónsul y al teatru costumbrista asturiano" [The Principality Dedicates the 47th Asturian Letters Week to Teresa Cónsul and Asturian Costumbrista Theatre]. Actualidad (in Spanish). Gobierno del Principado de Asturias. 12 April 2026.
- Fuertes Acevedo, Máximo (1885). Bosquejo acerca del estado que alcanzó en todas épocas la literatura en Asturias, seguido de una extensa bibliografía de los escritores asturianos [Outline of the Development of Literature in Asturias throughout History, Followed by an Extensive Bibliography of Asturian Writers] (in Spanish). Badajoz: Tipografía La Industria.
- Iglesia, Laura; Díaz, Adolfo Camilo, eds. (2026). De viva voz. Taresa Cónsul y el teatru asturianu [In Her Own Voice: Teresa Cónsul and Asturian Theatre] (in Asturian). Uviéu: Conseyería de Cultura, Política Llingüística y Deporte del Principáu d'Asturies. ISBN 979-1-388-14918-4.
- Mori de Arriba, Marta (2002). "El sieglu XVIII" [The Eighteenth Century]. In Ramos Corrada, Miguel (ed.). Historia de la Lliteratura Asturiana [History of Asturian Literature] (PDF) (in Asturian). Uviéu: Academia de la Llingua Asturiana. pp. 95–156. ISBN 9788481683356.
- Munthe, Åke (1887). Anteckningar om folkmålet i en trakt af vestra Asturien [Notes on the Popular Speech of a Region of Western Asturias] (PDF) (in Swedish). Upsala: Almqvist & Wiksell.
- Ruiz de la Peña, Álvaro (1980). "Notas para la biografía de una poetisa bable del siglo XVIII: Teresa Cónsul" [Notes for the Biography of an Eighteenth-Century Asturian-Language Woman Poet: Teresa Cónsul]. Cuadernos de Estudios del Siglo XVIII (in Spanish) (7–8): 141–145. doi:10.17811/cesxviii.7-8.1980.141-145.
- Serrano y Sanz, Manuel (1903). Apuntes para una biblioteca de escritoras españolas desde el año 1401 al 1833 [Notes towards a Bibliography of Spanish Women Writers from 1401 to 1833] (in Spanish). Vol. 1. Madrid: Sucesores de Rivadeneyra.
- Suárez, Constantino (1936). "Consul (Escolástica Teresa)". Escritores y artistas asturianos: índice bio-bibliográfico [Asturian Writers and Artists: A Biobibliographical Index] (in Spanish). Vol. 2. Madrid.
