= Salinas (Castrillón) =

- Parish
- Location within Spain
- Coordinates: 43.580556°N 5.952222°W
- Country: Spain
- Autonomous community: Asturias
- Province: Asturias
- Municipality: Castrillón

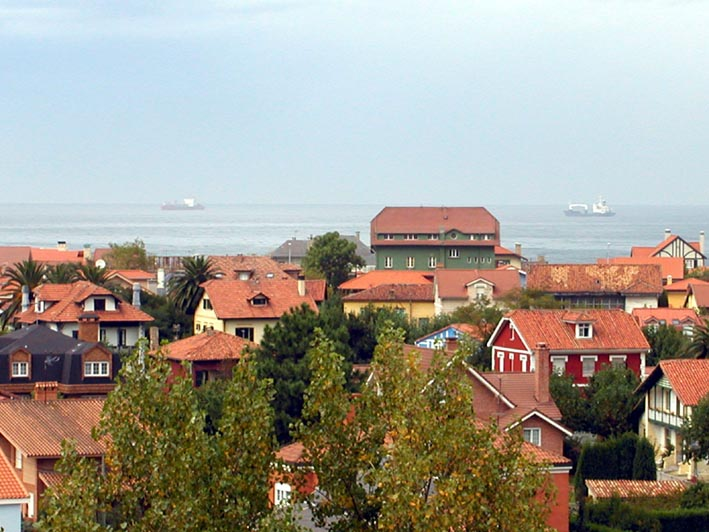
Playa de Salinas

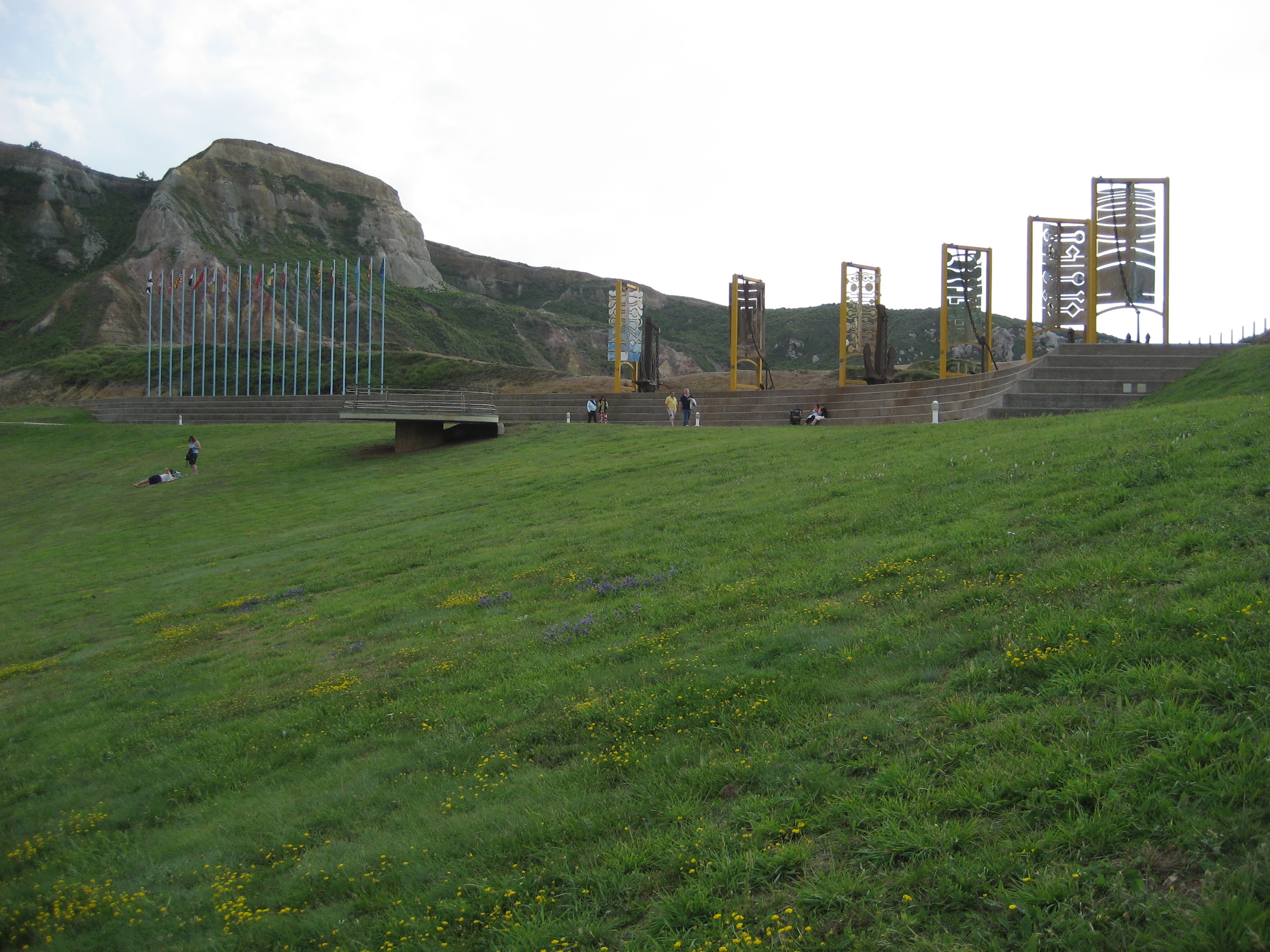
Philippe Cousteau Anchor Museum

Salinas is one of eight parishes (administrative divisions) in Castrillón, a municipality within the province and autonomous community of Asturias, in northern Spain.

The population is 4,635 (INE 2006).

Salinas is a seaside resort and is the second most populated municipality behind Piedrasblancas, which is located just 2 km away.

It has one of the longest beaches in Asturias, which is divided into 3 parts: Salinas, L'Espartal and San Xuan.

Salinas is visited by hundreds of tourists every year. Most of them come from Madrid, seeking a cooler summer.

== Culture ==
The Philippe Cousteau Anchor Museum is located in Salinas on La Peñon peninsula near the Arnao tunnel.

== Villages ==
- Raíces Nuevo / La Fundición
- Salinas
