= Naveces =

- Parish
- Location within Spain
- Coordinates: 43.570908°N 6.013611°W
- Country: Spain
- Autonomous community: Asturias
- Province: Asturias
- Municipality: Castrillón

Population
  - Total: 570

Naveces is one of eight parishes (administrative divisions) in Castrillón, a municipality within the province and autonomous community of Asturias, in northern Spain.

It hosts the Fiesta de San Adriano.

The population is 570(INE 2011).
