= Piedrasblancas =

Coordinates: 43.560°N 5.976°W

- Villa
- Interactive map of Piedrasblancas
- Country: Spain
- Autonomous community: Asturias
- Province: Asturias
- Municipality: Castrillón
- Parish: Laspra

Population (2009)
  - Total: 9,544

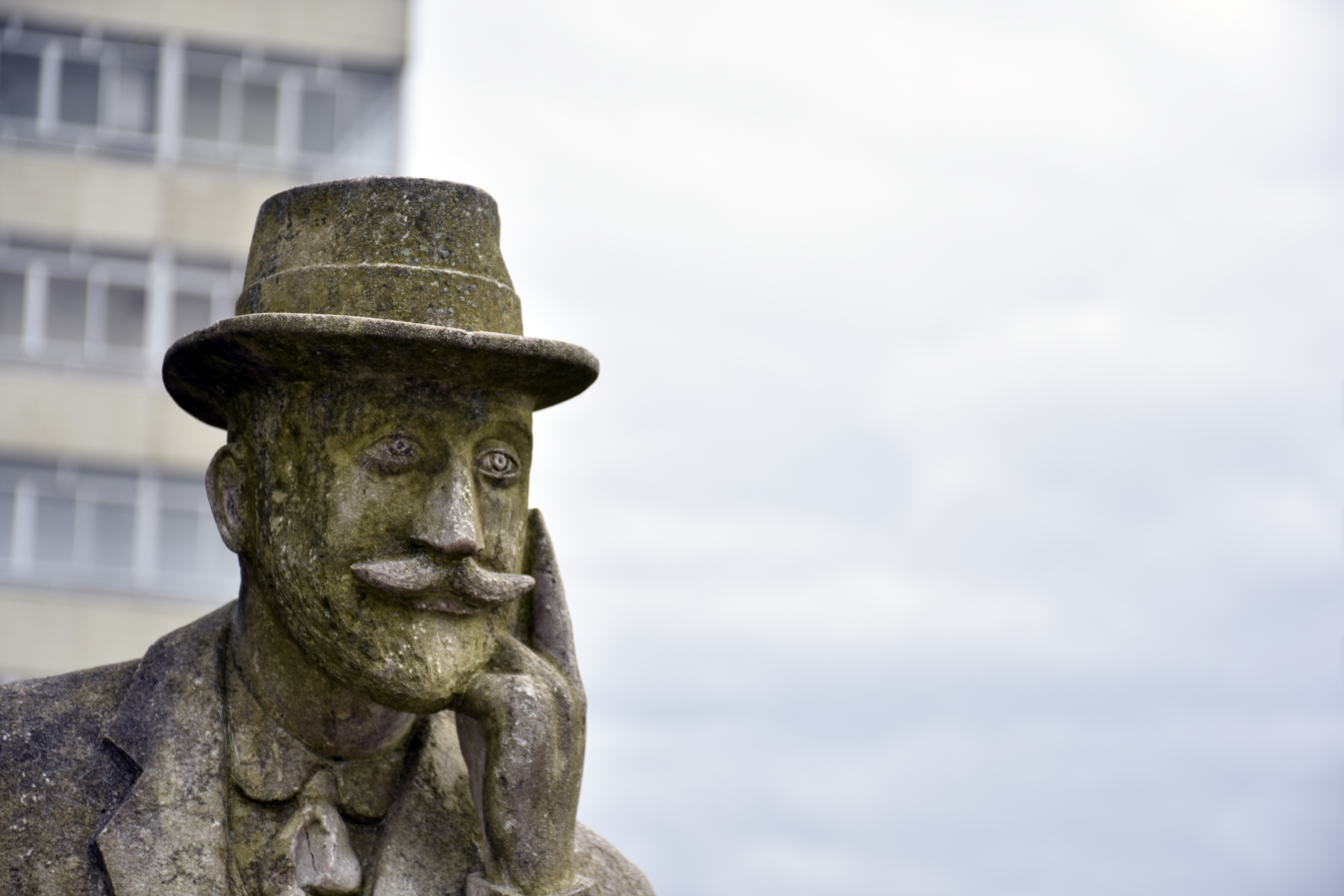
The monument to José Villalaín

Piedrasblancas is the capital town of the municipality of Castrillón, in the province of Asturias, Spain. It is 5 km (3 mi) west of Avilés, 32 km (20 mi) west of Gijón, 40 km (25 mi) northwest of Oviedo and 6 km (4 mi) east of Asturias Airport.

Piedrasblancas is a singular entity of population and has the title of Villa.

== Geography ==
Piedrasblancas, located in the parish of Laspra, is within easy access by motorway to the main urban areas of Asturias (i.e. Oviedo, Gijón, Avilés), and many of its residents commute daily to those areas.

Although not properly on the coastline, it is within walking distance from the beaches of Salinas, Arnao, and Santa Maria del Mar. The climate is oceanic, characterized by mild winters and summers, with temperatures rarely exceeding 25 °C (77 °F) or going below 0 °C (32 °F). Rain is frequent and may fall in any season, snow is rare.
