= List of the busiest airports in Morocco =

The following is a list of the busiest airports in Morocco.

== Morocco's busiest airports by passenger traffic ==
=== 2023 ===
Rank	Airport	City served	Total passengers	2019-2023 change	Rank change
1	Mohammed V International Airport	Casablanca	9,790,914	▼5.1%	Steady
2	Marrakesh Menara Airport	Marrakesh	6,903,964	▲7.9%	Steady
3	Agadir-Al Massira Airport	Agadir	2,304,045	▲14.7%	Steady
4	Tangier Ibn Battouta Airport	Tangier	1,913,698	▲41.1%	▲1
5	Fès–Saïss Airport	Fez	1,724,067	▲21.5%	▼1
6	Rabat–Salé Airport	Rabat	1,201,676	▲9.1%	Steady
7	Nador International Airport	Nador	1,025,652	▲32.6%	Steady
8	Oujda-Angad Airport	Oujda	938,058	▲33.6%	Steady
9	Hassan I Airport	Laayoune (Western Sahara) (Note: Although the airport is not in Morocco, the airport itself is operated by Moroccan airports company ONDA, therefore it is on the list.)	254,768	▼0.3%	▲1
10	Sania Ramel Airport	Tétouan	253,552	▲534.2%	▲5
11	Dakhla Airport	Dakhla (Western Sahara)	234,831	▼8.6%	▼2
12	Essaouira-Mogador Airport	Essaouira	180,302	▲49.7%	Steady
13	Ouarzazate Airport	Ouarzazate	138,454	▲1.8%	▼2
14	Cherif Al Idrissi Airport	Al Hoceima	101,126	▲9.8%	▼1
15	Moulay Ali Cherif Airport	Errachidia	69,114	▲29.5%	▼1
16	Guelmim Airport	Guelmim	29,403	▲122.6%	▲1
17	Tan Tan Airport	Tan-Tan	14,022	▲7.8%	▲1
18	Zagora Airport	Zagora	12,848	▼25.1%	▼2
19	Ben Slimane Airport	Benslimane	754	▲126.4%	▲2
20	Beni Mellal Airport	Beni Mellal	1	▼99.9%	Steady
21	Bouarfa Airport	Bouarfa	0	▼100.0%	▼2

=== 2019 ===
Rank	Airport	Total passengers	Annual change	Rank change
1	Casablanca-Mohammed V	10,306,293	▲5.9%	Steady
2	Marrakesh	6,396,394	▲21.1%	Steady
3	Agadir	2,008,465	▲4.5%	Steady
4	Fez	1,417,881	▲8.2%	Steady
5	Tangiers	1,353,860	▲20.1%	Steady
6	Rabat	1,100,846	▲11.5%	Steady
7	Nador	772,371	▲8.7%	Steady
8	Oujda	701,913	▲3.8%	Steady
9	Dakhla	256,975	▲26.8%	▲1
10	Laayoune	255,610	▲15.3%	▼1
11	Ouarzazate	136,007	▲52.8%	▲1
12	Essaouira	120,435	▲15.2%	▼1
13	Al Hoceima	92,121	▲16.1%	Steady
14	Errachidia	53,366	▲44.6%	Steady
15	Tétouan	39,982	▲89.7%	Steady
16	Zagora	17,156	▲71.5%	▲2
17	Guelmim	13,210	▲26.0%	▼1
18	Tan Tan	12,957	▲25.8%	▼1
19	Bouarfa	2,909	▲2618.7%	▲2
20	Beni Mellal	764	▼77.0%	▼1
21	Ben Slimane	325	▲22.6%	▼1

=== 2018 ===
Rank	Airport	Total passengers	Annual change	Rank change
1	Casablanca-Mohammed V	9,732,044	▲3.9%	Steady
2	Marrakesh	5,279,575	▲20.9%	Steady
3	Agadir	1,922,344	▲24.5%	Steady
4	Fez	1,309,481	▲17.3%	Steady
5	Tangiers	1,127,541	▲5.0%	Steady
6	Rabat	987,485	▲6.8%	Steady
7	Nador	710,559	▲0.5%	Steady
8	Oujda	675,917	▲6.3%	Steady
9	Laayoune	221,784	▲7.5%	Steady
10	Dakhla	202,645	▲20.2%	Steady
11	Essaouira	104,587	▲25.4%	Steady
12	Ouarzazate	89,024	▲36.9%	▲1
13	Al Hoceima	79,324	▲10.1%	▼1
14	Errachidia	36,915	▲103.4%	▲1
15	Tétouan	21,075	▼11.4%	▼1
16	Guelmim	10,481	▼5.5%	▲1
17	Tan Tan	10,303	▼15.3%	▼1
18	Zagora	10,004	▲70.4%	▲1
19	Beni Mellal	3,351	▼49.8%	▼1
20	Ben Slimane	261	▲832.1%	▲1
21	Bouarfa	107	▲2.7%	▼1

=== 2017 ===
Rank	Airport	Total passengers	Annual change	Rank change	
1	Casablanca-Mohammed V	9,364,861			Steady
2	Marrakesh	4,366,263			Steady
3	Agadir	1,544,244			Steady
4	Fez	1,116,095			Steady
5	Tangiers	1,074,177			Steady
6	Rabat	924,686			Steady
7	Nador	706,979			Steady
8	Oujda	635,746			Steady
9	Laayoune	206,274			Steady
10	Dakhla	168,552			Steady
11	Essaouira	83,414			Steady
12	Al Hoceima	72,044			▲1
13	Ouarzazate	65,010			▼1

=== 2016 ===
Rank	Airport	Total passengers	Annual change	Rank change
1	Casablanca-Mohammed V	8,616,474	▲5,36%	Steady
2	Marrakesh	3,894,227	▼2,12%	Steady
3	Agadir	1,334,173	▼5,24%	Steady
4	Fez	892,974	▲0,73%	Steady
5	Rabat	873,169	▲23,69%	▲1
6	Tangiers	848,643	▲7,78%	▼1
7	Nador	640,122	▲12.7%	Steady
8	Oujda	546,398	▲4.48%	Steady
9	Laayoune	182,477	▲19,95%	Steady
10	Dakhla	154,451	▲20,96%	Steady
11	Essaouira	67,977	▲3,01%	Steady
12	Ouarzazate	52,791	▼7,10%	Steady
13	Al Hoceima	45,560	▼3,63%	Steady

=== 2013 ===
Rank	Airport	Total passengers	Annual change	Rank change
1	Casablanca-Mohammed V	7,559,751	▲5.2%	Steady
2	Marrakesh	3,828,518	▲13.5%	Steady
3	Agadir	1,479,341	▲6.8%	Steady
4	Tangiers	822,259	▲4.4%	Steady
5	Fez	790,785	▲20.8%	Steady
6	Nador	611,888	▲1.6%	Steady
7	Oujda	505,374	▲12.7%	Steady
8	Rabat	485,713	▲38.0%	Steady
10	Laayoune	107,004	▲13.25%	Steady
11	Essaouira	78,193	▲207.3%	▲3
12	Dakhla	76,179	▲16.58%	▼1
13	Ouarzazate	53,634	▼10.5%	▼1
14	Al Hoceima	48,628	▲9.9%	▼1
15	Tetouan	26,439	▲197.8%	7
16	Guelmim	10,749	▲28.73%	Steady
