= List of Royal Air Maroc destinations =

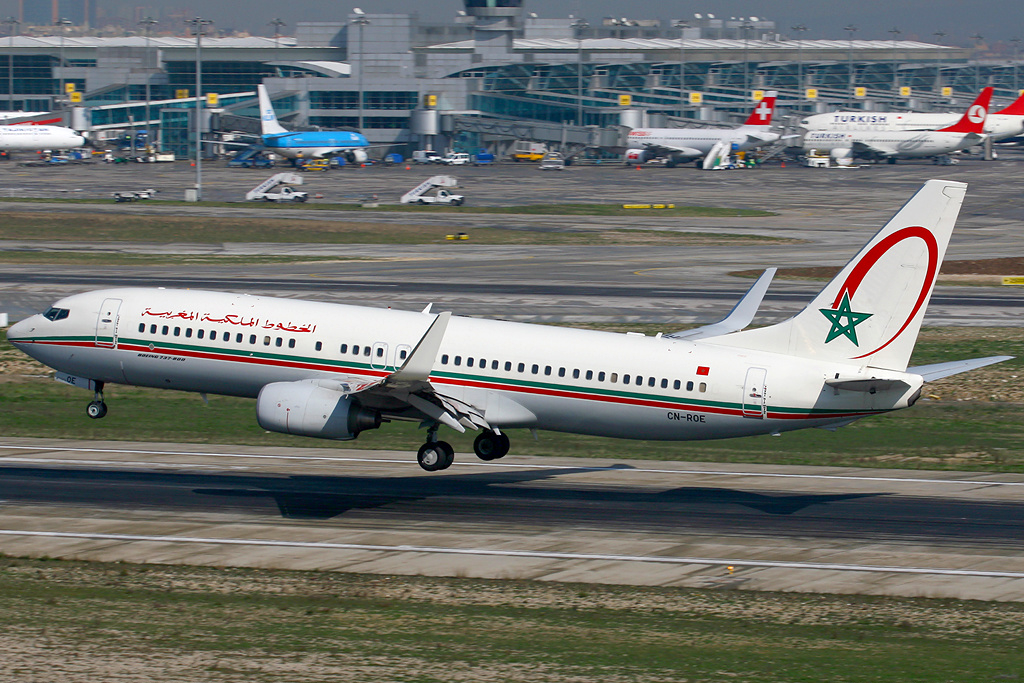
A Royal Air Maroc Boeing 737-800 lands at Atatürk Airport in 2007.

Royal Air Maroc (RAM), Morocco's national airline, was founded in July 1953 from the merger of Air Maroc and Air Atlas.

As of February 2014, RAM served a network comprising over 90 destinations, of which 56 are international ones. The carrier flies to 17 cities within Morocco and to 11 cities in France; it also serves twelve more countries in the rest of Europe, 24 in Africa, three in the Americas and two in the Middle East. The cargo network comprises another three destinations. International seat capacity to and from Morocco is led by RAM, as of January 2015, with 57% of these seats offered to Western Europe traffic; Casablanca–Agadir and –Marrakesh are RAM's largest domestic routes.

Following is a list showing the destinations served by the company as part of its scheduled services, as of January 2015. The list includes the country, city and airport's name, with the airline's hubs, cargo, seasonal and focus cities marked. Destinations served by RAM's subsidiary Royal Air Maroc Express are also listed.

== List ==
Country	City	Airport	Notes	Refs
Algeria	Algiers	Houari Boumediene Airport	Terminated	
Algeria	Oran	Oran Es Sénia Airport	Terminated	
Angola	Luanda	Dr. António Agostinho Neto International Airport		
Angola	Luanda	Quatro de Fevereiro Airport	Airport closed	
Austria	Vienna	Vienna International Airport	Terminated	
Belgium	Brussels	Brussels Airport		
Benin	Cotonou	Cadjehoun Airport		
Brazil	Rio de Janeiro	Rio de Janeiro/Galeão International Airport	Terminated	
Brazil	São Paulo	São Paulo/Guarulhos International Airport		
Burkina Faso	Ouagadougou	Ouagadougou Airport		
Cameroon	Douala	Douala International Airport		
Cameroon	Yaoundé	Yaoundé Nsimalen International Airport		
Canada	Montreal	Montréal–Trudeau International Airport		
Canada	Toronto	Toronto Pearson International Airport		
Cape Verde	Ilha do Sal	Amílcar Cabral International Airport	Terminated	
Cape Verde	Praia	Praia International Airport		
Central African Republic	Bangui	Bangui M'Poko International Airport		
Chad	N'Djamena	N'Djamena International Airport		
China	Beijing	Beijing Daxing International Airport		
Democratic Republic of the Congo	Kinshasa	N'djili Airport		
Denmark	Copenhagen	Copenhagen Airport	Terminated	
Egypt	Cairo	Cairo International Airport		
Equatorial Guinea	Malabo	Malabo International Airport		
France	Bastia	Bastia – Poretta Airport	Terminated	
France	Bordeaux	Bordeaux–Mérignac Airport		
France	Lille	Lille Airport		
France	Lyon	Lyon–Saint-Exupéry Airport		
France	Marseille	Marseille Provence Airport		
France	Montpellier	Montpellier–Méditerranée Airport		
France	Nantes	Nantes Atlantique Airport		
France	Nice	Nice Côte d'Azur Airport		
France	Paris	Charles de Gaulle Airport		
France	Paris	Orly Airport	Focus city	
France	Strasbourg	Strasbourg Airport		
France	Toulouse	Toulouse–Blagnac Airport		
Gabon	Libreville	Libreville International Airport		
Gambia	Banjul	Banjul International Airport		
Germany	Berlin	Berlin Tegel Airport	Terminated	
Germany	Düsseldorf	Düsseldorf Airport		
Germany	Frankfurt	Frankfurt Airport		
Germany	Munich	Munich Airport		
Ghana	Accra	Accra International Airport		
Gibraltar	Gibraltar	Gibraltar International Airport	Terminated	
Greece	Athens	Athens International Airport	Terminated	
Guinea	Conakry	Conakry International Airport		
Guinea-Bissau	Bissau	Osvaldo Vieira International Airport		
Israel	Tel Aviv	David Ben Gurion Airport	Suspended	
Italy	Bologna	Bologna Guglielmo Marconi Airport		
Italy	Milan	Milan Malpensa Airport		
Italy	Naples	Naples International Airport		
Italy	Rome	Leonardo da Vinci–Fiumicino Airport		
Italy	Turin	Turin Airport		
Italy	Venice	Venice Marco Polo Airport		
Ivory Coast	Abidjan	Félix-Houphouët-Boigny International Airport		
Kenya	Nairobi	Jomo Kenyatta International Airport	Terminated	
Kuwait	Kuwait City	Kuwait International Airport	Terminated	
Lebanon	Beirut	Beirut–Rafic Hariri International Airport	Terminated	
Liberia	Monrovia	Roberts International Airport		
Libya	Tripoli	Tripoli International Airport	Terminated	
Mali	Bamako	Bamako–Sénou International Airport		
Mauritania	Nouakchott	Nouakchott–Oumtounsy International Airport		
Morocco	Agadir	Agadir–Al Massira Airport		
Morocco	Al Hoceima	Cherif Al Idrissi Airport		
Morocco	Beni Mellal	Beni Mellal Airport		
Morocco	Bouarfa	Bouarfa Airport	Terminated	
Morocco	Casablanca	Mohammed V International Airport	Hub	
Morocco	Dakhla	Dakhla Airport		
Morocco	Errachidia	Moulay Ali Cherif Airport		
Morocco	Essaouira	Mogador Airport	Terminated	
Morocco	Fez	Fes-Saïss Airport		
Morocco	Laâyoune	Hassan I Airport		
Morocco	Marrakesh	Marrakesh Menara Airport	Focus city	
Morocco	Nador	Nador International Airport		
Morocco	Ouarzazate	Ouarzazate Airport		
Morocco	Oujda	Angads Airport		
Morocco	Rabat	Rabat-Salé Airport		
Morocco	Tangier	Tangier Ibn Battouta Airport	Focus city	
Morocco	Tétouan	Sania Ramel Airport		
Morocco	Zagora	Zagora Airport		
Netherlands	Amsterdam	Amsterdam Airport Schiphol		
Netherlands	Rotterdam	Rotterdam The Hague Airport		
Niger	Niamey	Diori Hamani International Airport		
Nigeria	Abuja	Nnamdi Azikiwe International Airport		
Nigeria	Kano	Mallam Aminu Kano International Airport	Terminated	
Nigeria	Lagos	Murtala Muhammed International Airport		
Portugal	Lisbon	Lisbon Airport		
Portugal	Porto	Porto Airport		
Qatar	Doha	Hamad International Airport		
Republic of the Congo	Brazzaville	Maya-Maya Airport		
Republic of the Congo	Pointe-Noire	Pointe-Noire Airport	Terminated	
Russia	Moscow	Moscow Domodedovo Airport	Terminated	
Russia	Moscow	Sheremetyevo International Airport		
Russia	Saint Petersburg	Pulkovo Airport		
Saudi Arabia	Jeddah	King Abdulaziz International Airport		
Saudi Arabia	Riyadh	King Khalid International Airport		
Senegal	Dakar	Blaise Diagne International Airport		
Sierra Leone	Freetown	Lungi International Airport		
Spain	Barcelona	Josep Tarradellas Barcelona–El Prat Airport		
Spain	Bilbao	Bilbao Airport	Terminated	
Spain	Las Palmas	Gran Canaria Airport		
Spain	Madrid	Madrid–Barajas Airport		
Spain	Málaga	Málaga Airport		
Spain	Tenerife	Tenerife North Airport	Terminated	
Spain	Tenerife	Tenerife South Airport		
Spain	Valencia	Valencia Airport		
Sweden	Stockholm	Stockholm Arlanda Airport	Terminated	
Switzerland	Geneva	Geneva Airport		
Switzerland	Zurich	Zurich Airport		
Syria	Damascus	Damascus International Airport	Terminated	
Togo	Lomé	Lomé–Tokoin International Airport		
Turkey	Antalya	Antalya Airport	Terminated	
Turkey	Istanbul	Istanbul Airport		
Turkey	Istanbul	Atatürk Airport	Airport closed to passenger flights	
Turkey	Istanbul	Istanbul Sabiha Gökçen International Airport	Terminated	
Tunisia	Tunis	Tunis–Carthage International Airport		
United Arab Emirates	Abu Dhabi	Abu Dhabi International Airport	Terminated	
United Arab Emirates	Dubai	Dubai International Airport		
United Kingdom	London	Gatwick Airport		
United Kingdom	London	Heathrow Airport		
United Kingdom	London	London Stansted Airport	Seasonal	
United Kingdom	Manchester	Manchester Airport		
United States	Boston	Logan International Airport	Terminated	
United States	Los Angeles	Los Angeles International Airport		
United States	Miami	Miami International Airport		
United States	New York City	John F. Kennedy International Airport		
United States	Washington, D.C.	Washington Dulles International Airport		

== See also ==
- Transport in Morocco
