= Casa Air Service =

Moroccan airline

IATA	ICAO	Call sign
-	-	-
- Founded: 1995
- Hubs: Mohammed V International Airport
- Headquarters: Casablanca, Morocco
- Website: http://www.casaairservice.ma/

Casa Air Service was a Moroccan airline. In 1995 it began to offer private air transport services. For 40 years prior to that, it was involved in agricultural air services.

Its main base was Mohammed V International Airport, Casablanca.

== Destinations ==
- Algeria
  - In Salah – (In Salah Airport)
  - Oran – (Oran Airport)
  - Tamanrasset – (Aguenar – Hadj Bey Akhamok Airport)
- Morocco
  - Al Hoceima – (Cherif Al Idrissi Airport)
  - Agadir – (Agadir Airport)
  - Agadir (Taroudant) – (Al Kasbah National Airport)
  - Casablanca – (Mohammed V International Airport) hub
  - Casablanca – (Anfa Airport)
  - Dakhla – (Dakhla Airport)
  - Essaouira – (Mogador Airport)
  - Errachidia – (Moulay Ali Cherif Airport)
  - Fez – (Fes-Saïss Airport)
  - Guelmim – (Guelmim Airport)
  - Ifrane – (Ifrane Airport)
  - Laayoune – (Hassan Airport)
  - Marrakesh – (Marrakesh Menara Airport)
  - Meknes – (Meknes Airport)
  - Nador – (Nador International Airport)
  - Ouarzazate – (Ouarzazate Airport)
  - Oujda – (Angads Airport)
  - Rabat – (Rabat-Sale Airport) hub
  - Sidi Ifni – (Sidi Ifni Airport)
  - Smara – (Smara Airport)
  - Tangier – (Ibn Batouta International Airport) hub
  - Tarfaya – (Tarfaya Airport)
  - Tan-Tan – (Tan Tan Airport)
  - Tétouan – (Sania Ramel Airport)
- Spain
  - Almería (Almería Airport)
  - Melilla (Melilla Airport)

== Fleet ==
- 1 Corvette 100 - (Aérospatiale Corvette)
- 1 Cessna 414
- 1 Cessna 182
- 2 Embraer 135
- 1 Fokker 70
