= Guelmim Airport =

Domestic airport in Guelmim, Morocco

Guelmim Airport مطار كلميم (Arabic)
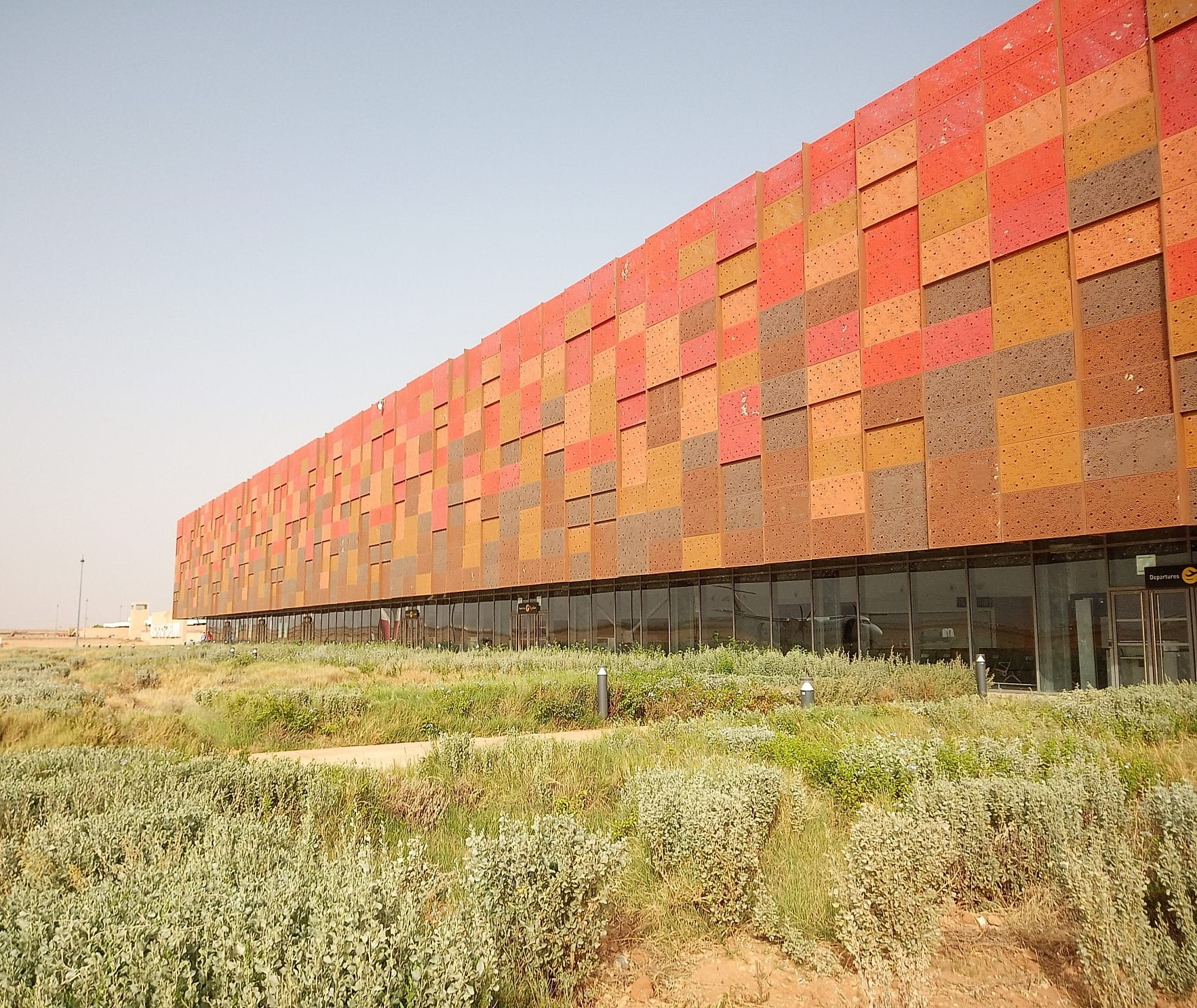
- IATA: GLN; ICAO: GMAG

Summary
- Airport type: Public
- Operator: ONDA
- Location: Guelmim, Morocco
- Coordinates: 29°01′00″N 10°04′04″W

Map
- Location of airport in Morocco

Runways
Direction	Length		Surface
Direction	m	ft	Surface
05/23	3,040	9,974	Asphalt

Guelmim Airport (IATA: GLN, ICAO: GMAG) is an airport serving Guelmim, a city in the central Guelmim-Oued Noun region in Morocco. The airport served over 10,700 passengers in the year 2013.

== Airlines and destinations ==
The following airlines operate regular scheduled and charter flights at Guelmim Airport:

Airlines	Destinations
Binter Canarias	Gran Canaria, Lanzarote
Royal Air Maroc Express	Casablanca, Tan Tan
