= Royal Air Maroc Express =

Regional airline of Morocco

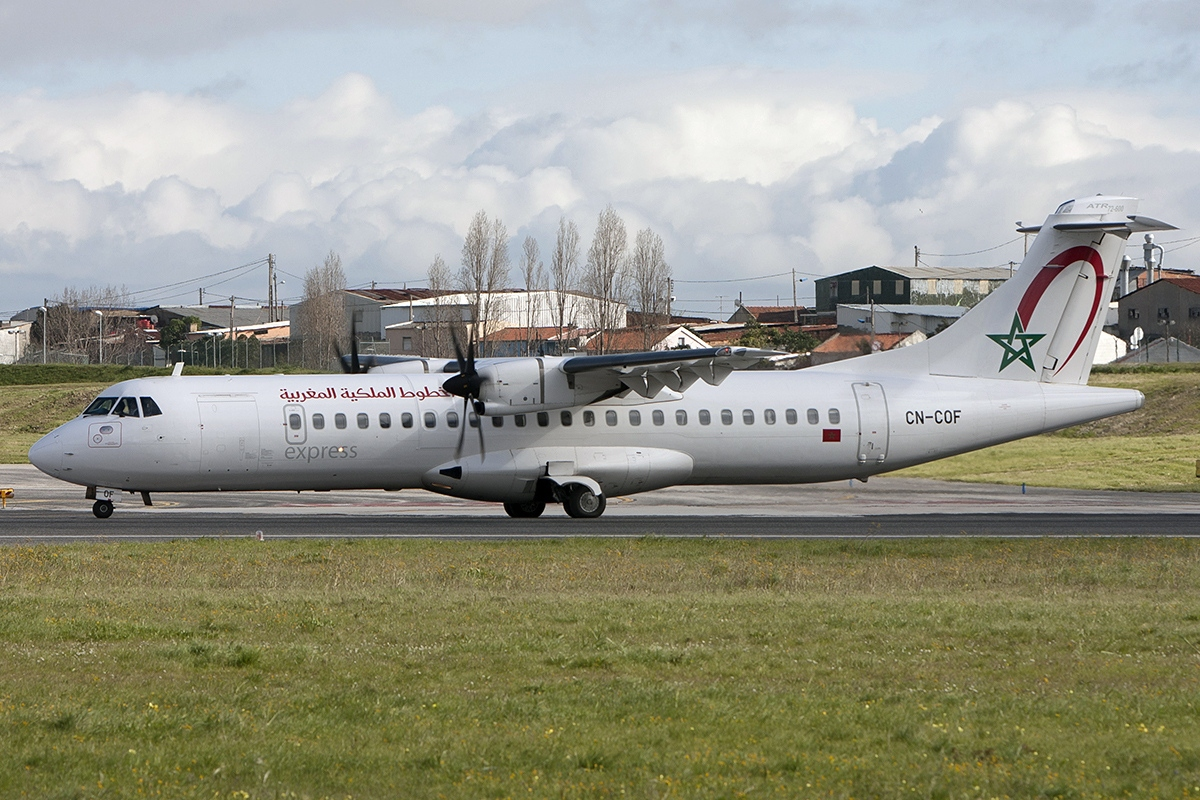
IATA	ICAO	Call sign
FN	RXP	EXPRESS MAROC
- Founded: July 2009; 17 years ago
- Hubs: Mohammed V International Airport
- Frequent-flyer program: Safar Flyer
- Alliance: Oneworld (affiliate)
- Fleet size: 6
- Destinations: 13
- Parent company: Royal Air Maroc
- Headquarters: Casablanca, Morocco
- Website: www.royalairmaroc.com

Royal Air Maroc Express is a regional airline and wholly owned subsidiary of Royal Air Maroc based in Casablanca, Morocco. The carrier operates scheduled domestic services and scheduled regional flights to Spain and the Canary Islands, as well as charter services for tour operators and corporate clients. The airline is based in Mohammed V International Airport.

== History ==
The airline began operations in July 2009. It is fully owned by Royal Air Maroc.

== Destinations ==
Royal Air Maroc Express serves the following destinations:

Country	City	Airport	Notes	Refs
Gibraltar	Gibraltar	Gibraltar International Airport	Terminated	
Morocco	Agadir	Agadir–Al Massira Airport		
Morocco	Al Hoceima	Cherif Al Idrissi Airport		
Morocco	Bouarfa	Bouarfa Airport	Terminated	
Morocco	Casablanca	Mohammed V International Airport	Hub	
Morocco	Errachidia	Moulay Ali Cherif Airport	Terminated	
Morocco	Essaouira	Mogador Airport	Terminated	
Morocco	Fes	Fes-Saïss Airport		
Morocco	Guelmim	Guelmim Airport		
Morocco	Marrakesh	Marrakesh Menara Airport		
Morocco	Nador	Nador International Airport	Terminated	
Morocco	Ouarzazate	Ouarzazate Airport		
Morocco	Oujda	Angads Airport	Terminated	
Morocco	Tangier	Tangier Ibn Battouta Airport	Focus city	
Morocco	Tan-Tan	Tan Tan Airport		
Morocco	Tetouan	Sania Ramel Airport		
Morocco	Zagora	Zagora Airport		
Portugal	Lisbon	Lisbon Airport	Terminated	
Portugal	Porto	Porto Airport	Terminated	
Spain	Las Palmas	Gran Canaria Airport		
Spain	Madrid	Madrid–Barajas Airport	Terminated	
Spain	Málaga	Málaga Airport		
Spain	Tenerife	Tenerife South Airport	Terminated	
Spain	Valencia	Valencia Airport		

== Fleet ==
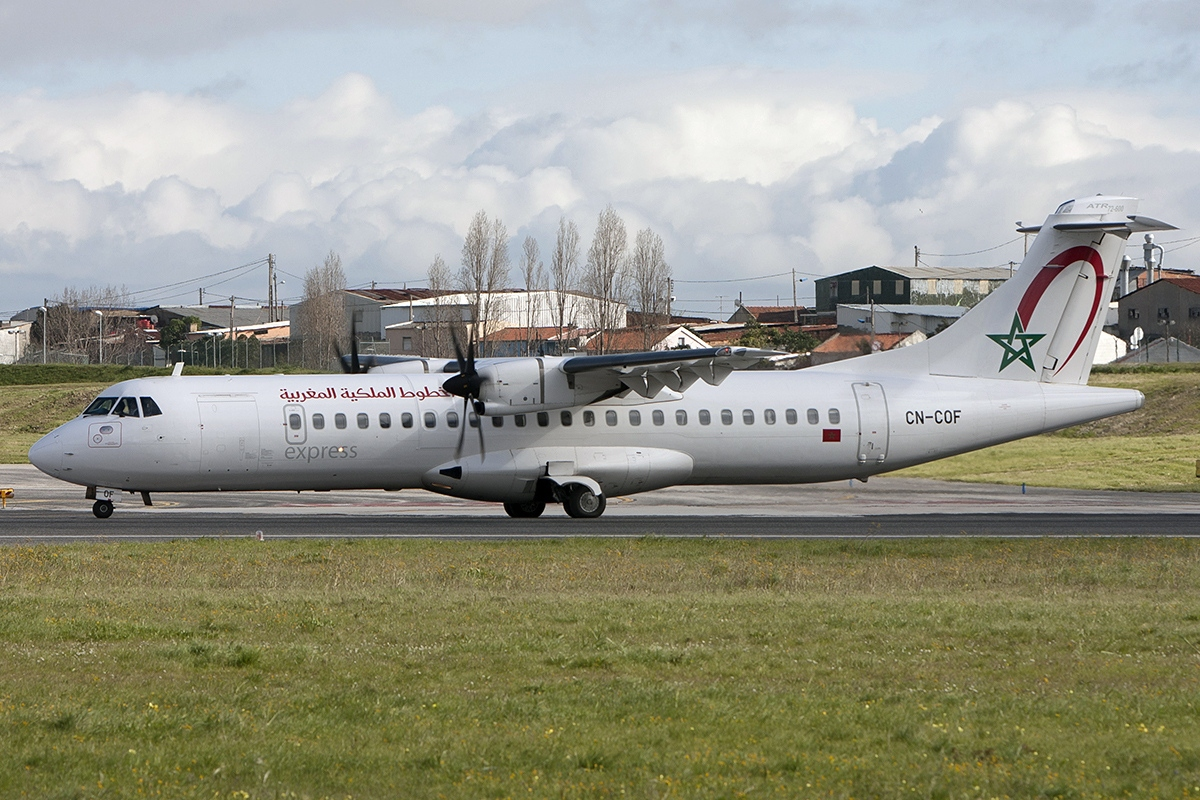
Royal Air Maroc Express ATR 72-600

As of August 2025, Royal Air Maroc Express operates the following aircraft:

Aircraft	Total	Orders	Passengers		
Aircraft	Total	Orders	J	Y	Total
ATR 72-600	6	—	12	58	70
Total	6	—			

== Accidents and incidents ==
- On 9 July 2018, Royal Air Maroc Express Flight 439, flying the third leg of a V-leg flight from Casablanca - Al Hoceima - Tangier and return, with near zero visibility, and 52 passengers and 5 crew on board, had a double impact with the ocean on approach to Al Hoceima when the captain violated operating procedures. This included deactivating the Ground Proximity Warning System (GPWS) and ignoring minimum height and visibility limits, with the result that the aircraft bounced off the surface of the sea twice on approach, about 1.4 nautical miles north of the airport, causing the pilot to declare a missed approach and to divert to an alternate airport at Nador International. The impacts resulted in severe damage to the landing gear and the lower body of the aircraft. No passengers or crew were harmed in the near crash and the aircraft was eventually repaired. The senior pilot initially lied to ATC about the reason for the missed approach as being a 'Bird Strike', and repeated this lie on his initial report.
