= Girona–Costa Brava Airport =

Girona–Costa Brava Airport Aeroport de Girona-Costa Brava

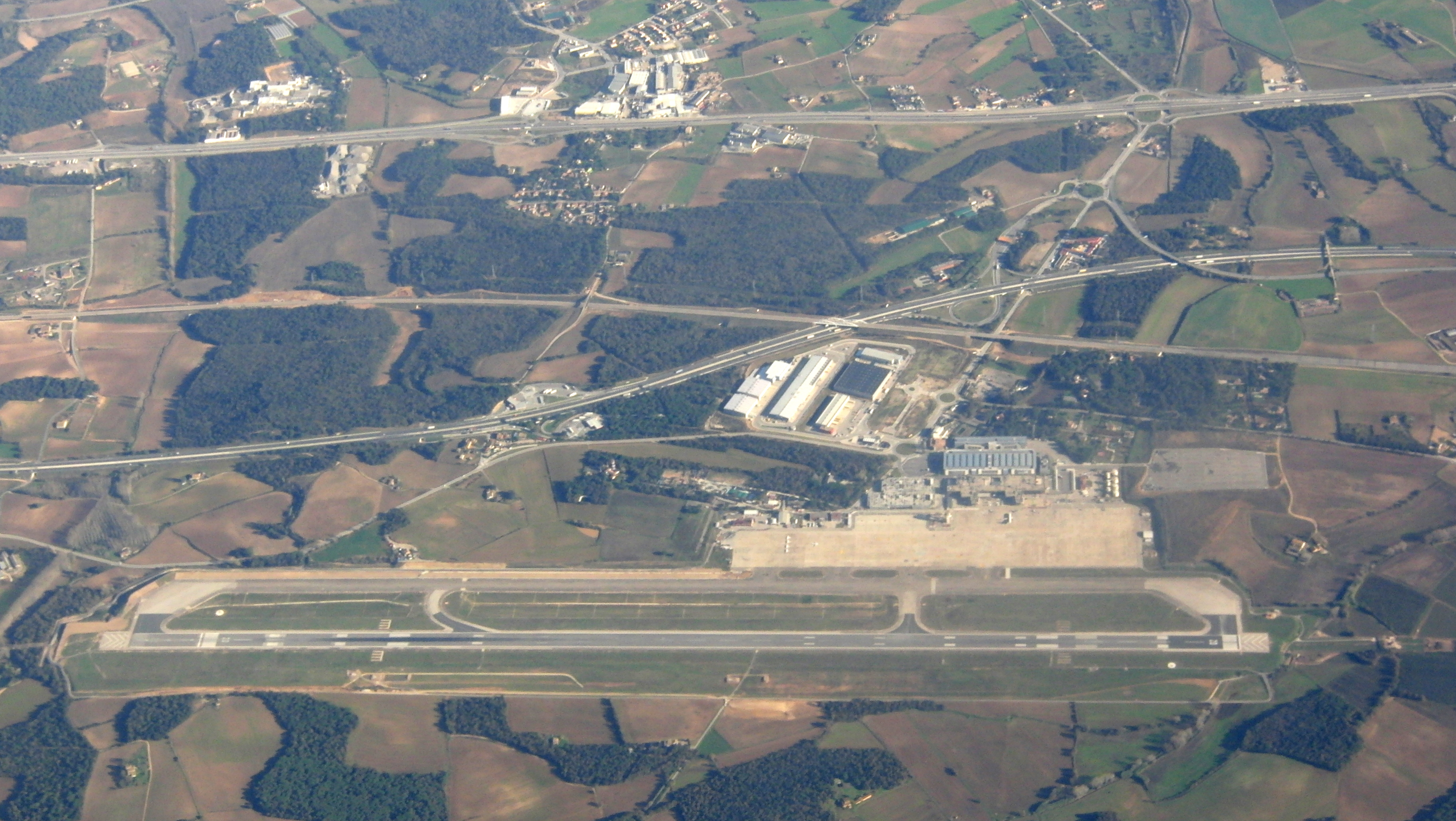
- IATA: GRO; ICAO: LEGE

Summary
- Airport type: Public
- Owner/Operator: Aena
- Serves: Girona, the Costa Brava and Barcelona, Catalonia, Spain
- Elevation AMSL: 143 m (469 ft)
- Coordinates: 41°54′03″N 002°45′38″E
- Website: aena.es

Map
- Location within Catalonia GRO (Spain)

Runways
Direction	Length		Surface
Direction	m	ft	Surface
01/19	2,400	7,874	Asphalt

Statistics (2018)
- Passengers: 2.019.876
- Passenger change 17-18: ▲3,8%
- Aircraft movements: 17.870
- Aircraft movements change 17-18: ▼7,2%
- Cargo (t): 133
- Source: AENA

Girona–Costa Brava Airport (IATA: GRO, ICAO: LEGE) (Catalan: Aeroport de Girona-Costa Brava, Spanish: Aeropuerto de Gerona-Costa Brava) is an airport located 12.5 km (7.8 mi) southwest of the city of Girona, next to the small village of Vilobí d'Onyar, in the north-east of Catalonia, Spain. The airport is well connected to the Costa Brava and the Pyrenees. Girona Airport is used as an alternative airport for Barcelona as well, even though the airport is 74 km (46 mi) north of the center of Barcelona.

== History ==
The airport was built in 1965, but passenger traffic was modest.

The early 2000s saw passenger numbers grow spectacularly after Ryanair chose Girona as one of its European hubs, marketing it as 'Barcelona-Girona'. In 1993, Girona Airport dealt with only 275,000 passengers; in the six years from 2002 to 2008 passenger numbers increased by nearly ten times from just over 500,000 to more than 5.5 million, but after Ryanair began to move their Barcelona operations from Girona to the larger El Prat International Airport, half of these were lost again in the next 4 years until 2012 with only 2.8 million passengers. 2014 saw less than 2.2 million passengers pass through the airport. In 2016 it carried just 1.6 million passengers.

== Facilities ==
The airport consists of one two-storey passenger terminal building. On the ground floor there are 33 check-in desks, with 11 boarding gates on the first floor for both domestic and international flights. Food is available in the departures area of the airport, as well as a few shops.

== Airlines and destinations ==
The following airlines operate regular scheduled and charter flights to and from Girona:

Airlines	Destinations
Air Arabia	Seasonal: Tangier
easyJet	Seasonal: Liverpool (begins 28 March 2027), London–Gatwick (begins 3 June 2027)
Enter Air	Seasonal charter: Gdańsk, Katowice, Poznań
Jet2.com	Seasonal: Bristol, Glasgow, Manchester
Ryanair	Beni Mellal, London–Stansted, Marrakesh, Pisa; Seasonal: Aalborg, Bari, Maastricht, Paderborn/Lippstadt, Pardubice, Sarajevo, Zagreb
Smartwings	Seasonal charter: Katowice

== Statistics ==
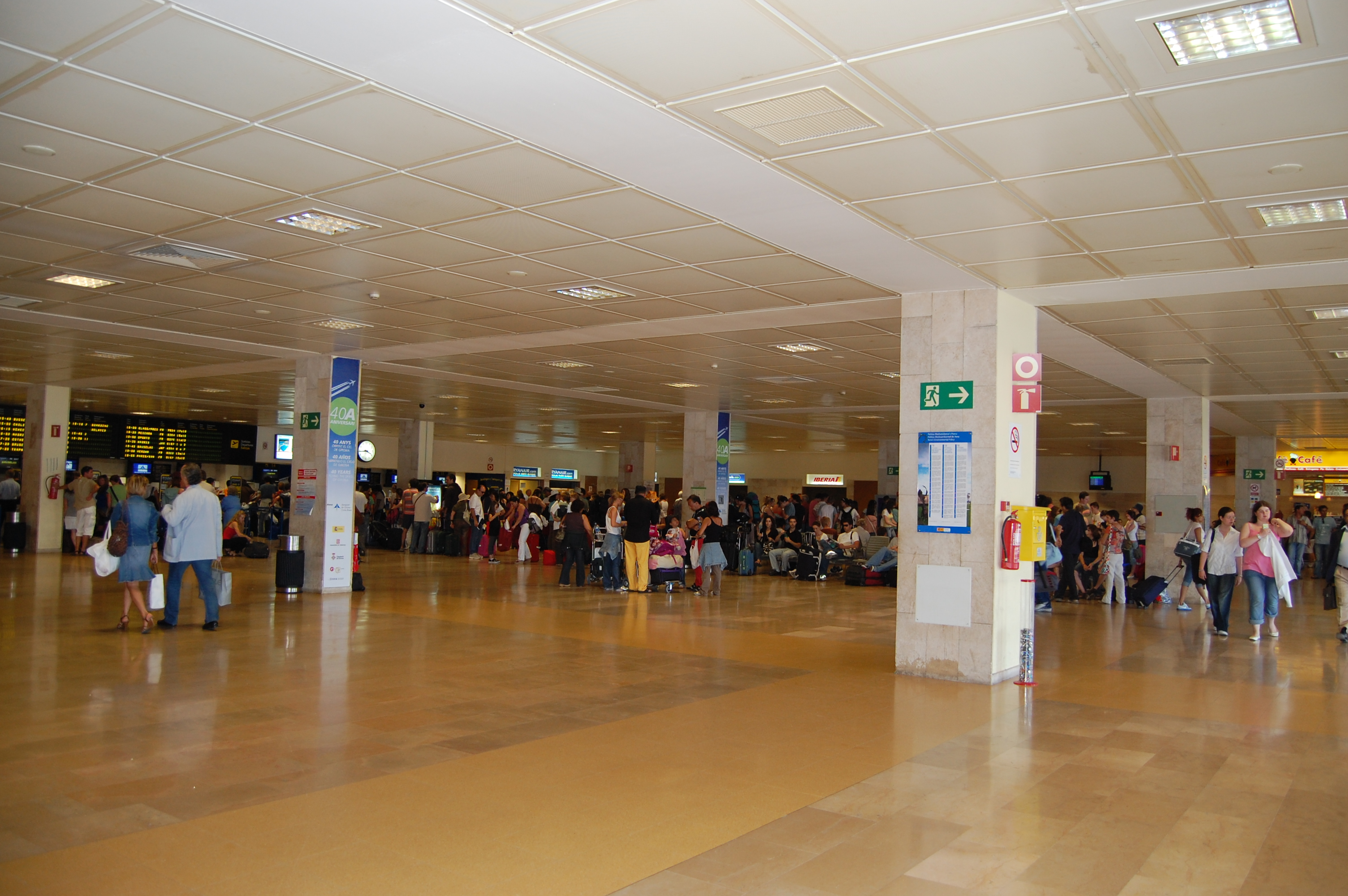
Check-in area

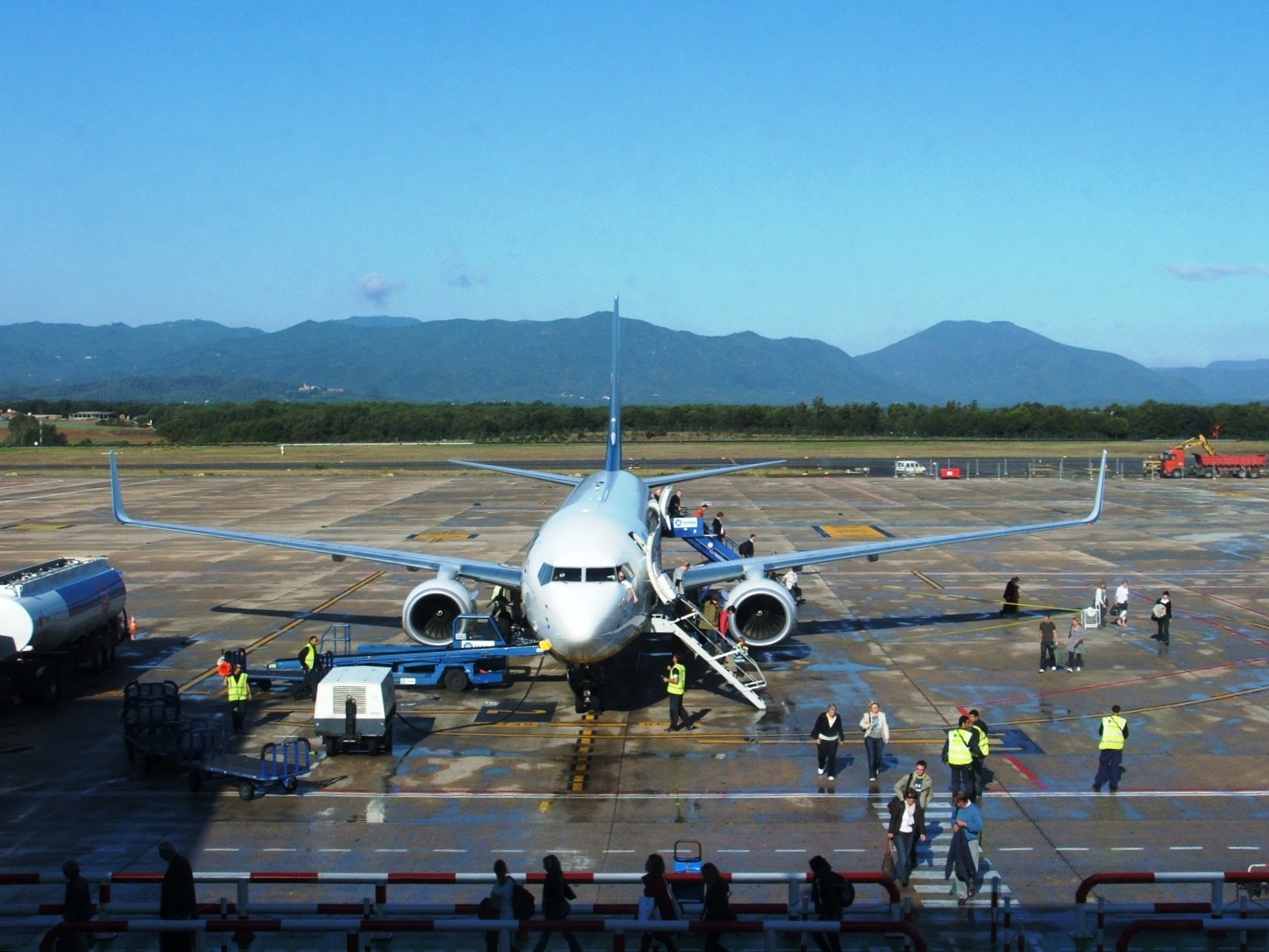
Apron view

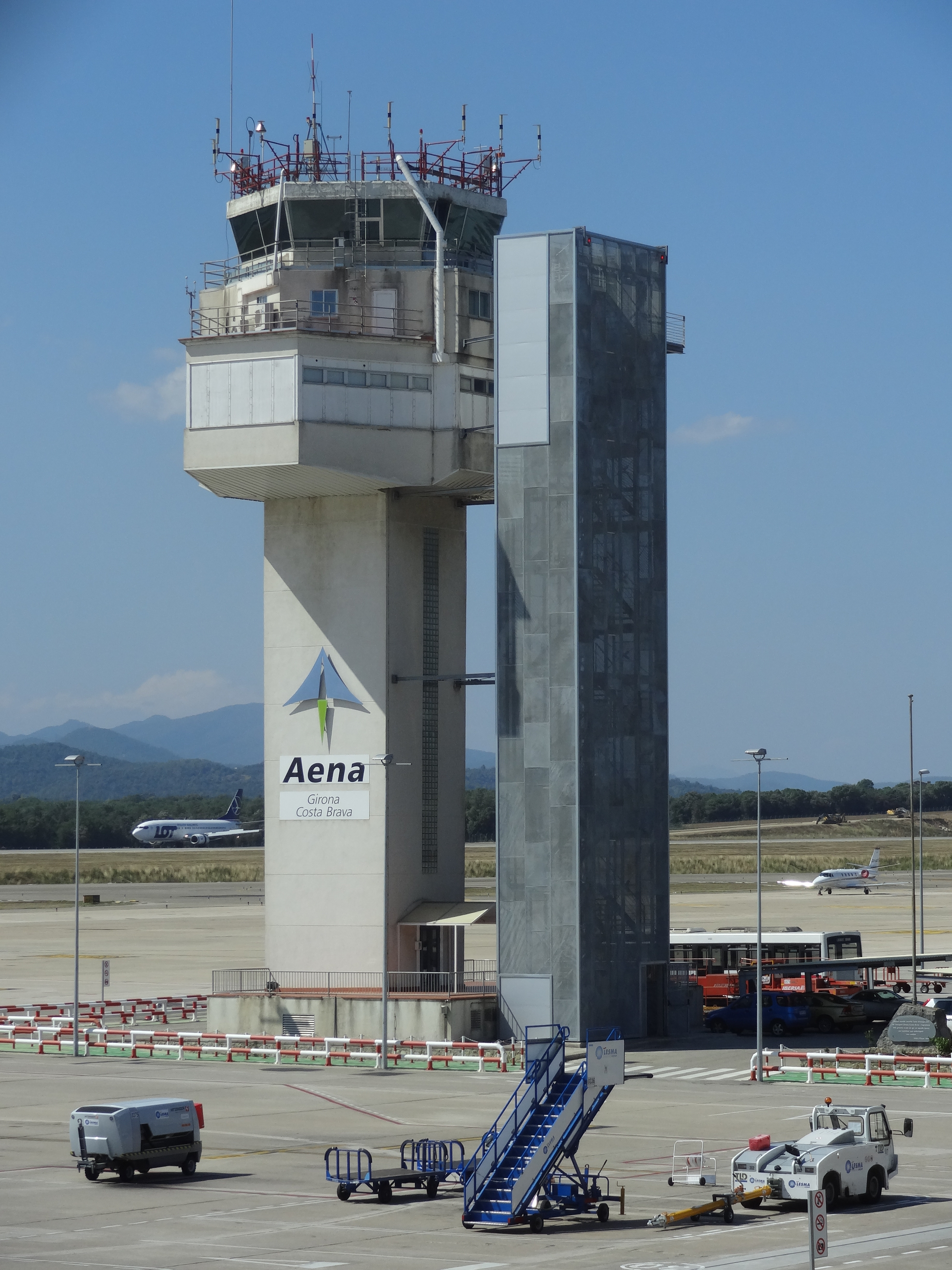
Control tower

Year	Passengers
1997	533,445
1998	610,607
1999	631,235
2000	651,402
2001	622,410
2002	557,187
2003	1,448,796
2004	2,962,988
2005	3,533,567
2006	3,614,223
2007	4,848,604
2008	5,507,294
2009	5,286,970
2010	4,863,785
2011	3,007,649
2012	2,844,571
2013	2,736,867
2014	2,160,646
2015	1,775,318
2016	1,664,763
2017	1,946,816
2018	2,019,876
2019	1,932,255
Source: Aena Statistics

== Ground transportation ==
Along with being an alternative option to Barcelona Airport, Girona Airport is convenient for the resorts along the Costa Brava, such as Lloret de Mar, l'Estartit and Blanes. It is about a 40-minute drive from the French border and many people use Girona Airport as a way of getting to the Pyrenees and the ski resorts of Andorra.

=== By car ===
The airport is served by three main roads:

- E-15/AP-7 (Perpignan, France – south of Spain)
- C-25 (Lleida – Vic – Girona)
- N-II, (Madrid – Barcelona – Perpignan, France)

=== By bus ===
There are six bus lines operating in the airport to:

- Barcelona
- Costa Brava/Maresme (stops at Tossa de Mar, Lloret de Mar, Blanes, Malgrat de Mar, Santa Susanna, Pineda de Mar and Calella de la Costa)
- North Costa Brava (stops at Figueres, Roses, Pineda de Mar, Calella de Palafrugell and Tossa de Mar)
- Girona
- Perpignan in France
- Andorra

=== By train ===
The closest main line railway station to the airport is in Girona. The closest railway station is in fact Riudellots Halt, 4 km (2.5 mi) away from the airport. There is a project to build a station for the AVE line LGV Perpignan–Figueres, which passes within a few hundred meters of the terminal.

== Incidents and accidents ==
- On 14 September 1999, at 21:47 UTC, a Boeing 757-204 charter flight from Cardiff, Wales, UK, with 236 passengers and 9 crew overshot the runway when landing in a storm and broke apart. After leaving the runway, it ran 343 metres (1,125 ft) across flat grassland beside the runway, before going diagonally over a substantial earth mound adjacent to the airport boundary, becoming semi-airborne as a result. Beyond the mound it hit and severed a number of medium-sized trees and the right engine struck the boundary fence. The aircraft then yawed considerably to the right, passed through the fence, landed again in a field, and its main landing gears collapsed. It finally stopped after a 244-metre (800 ft) slide across the field. Damage was substantial: the fuselage was broken in two places and the landing gear and both engines detached. Remarkably, there were no immediate fatalities but 44 people, including the aircraft's captain, received hospital treatment for severe to minor injuries. One elderly passenger died a week later.
