= Ben Slimane Airport =

- IATA: GMD; ICAO: GMMB

Summary
- Airport type: Public
- Location: Ben Slimane, Morocco
- Elevation AMSL: 627 ft (191 m)
- Coordinates: 33°39′20″N 007°13′17″W

Map
- Location of airport in Morocco

Runways
Direction	Length		Surface
Direction	m	ft	Surface
14/32	3,074	10,085	Asphalt
- Source: DAFIF

Ben Slimane Airport (IATA: GMD, ICAO: GMMB) is an airport serving Ben Slimane, a town in the Casablanca-Settat region in Morocco. It may have been built as a U.S. Strategic Air Command airbase.

== Facilities ==
The airport resides at an elevation of 627 feet (191 m) above mean sea level. It has 1 runway designated 14/32 with an asphalt surface measuring 3,074 by 46 metres (10,085 ft × 151 ft).
