= Beni Mellal Airport =

Airport serving Beni Mellal, Morocco

Beni Mellal Airport مطار بني ملال (Arabic)
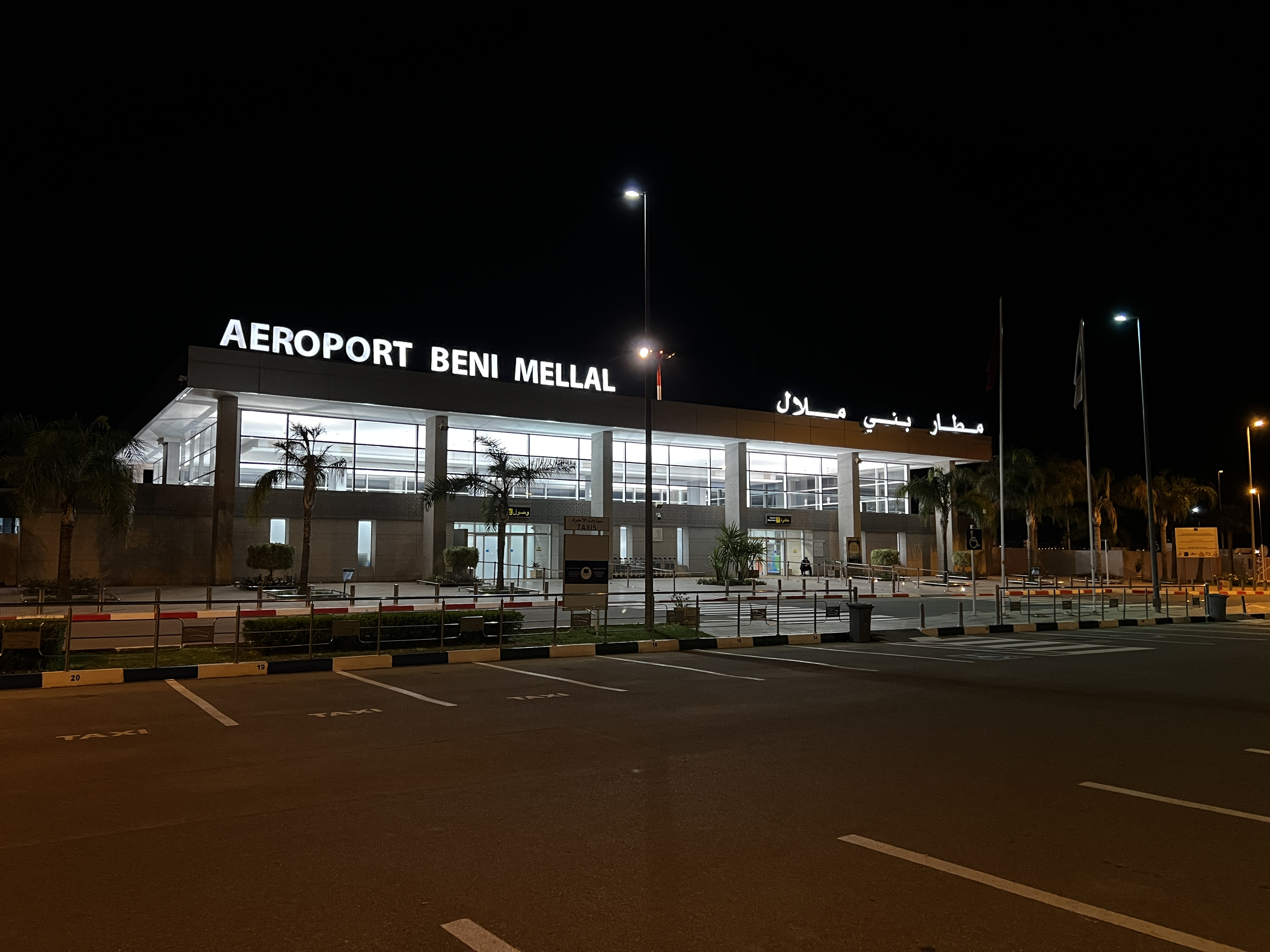
- IATA: BEM; ICAO: GMMD

Summary
- Airport type: Public
- Serves: Beni Mellal
- Elevation AMSL: 1,700 ft (520 m)
- Coordinates: 32°24′00″N 06°19′00″W

Map
- Location within Morocco

Runways
Direction	Length		Surface
Direction	m	ft	Surface
05/23	2,493	8,180	Asphalt
- Source: Google Maps

Beni Mellal Airport (IATA: BEM, ICAO: GMMD) is an airport serving Beni Mellal, Morocco opened in 2014. The airport is located near the township of Oulad Yaich.

== Airlines and destinations ==
The following airlines operate regular scheduled and charter flights at Beni Mellal Airport:

Airlines	Destinations
Ryanair	Bergamo, Girona, Tangier

== See also ==
- Transport in Morocco
