= Rabat–Salé Airport =

International airport serving Rabat, Morocco

Rabat–Salé Airport مطار الرباط سلا (Arabic)
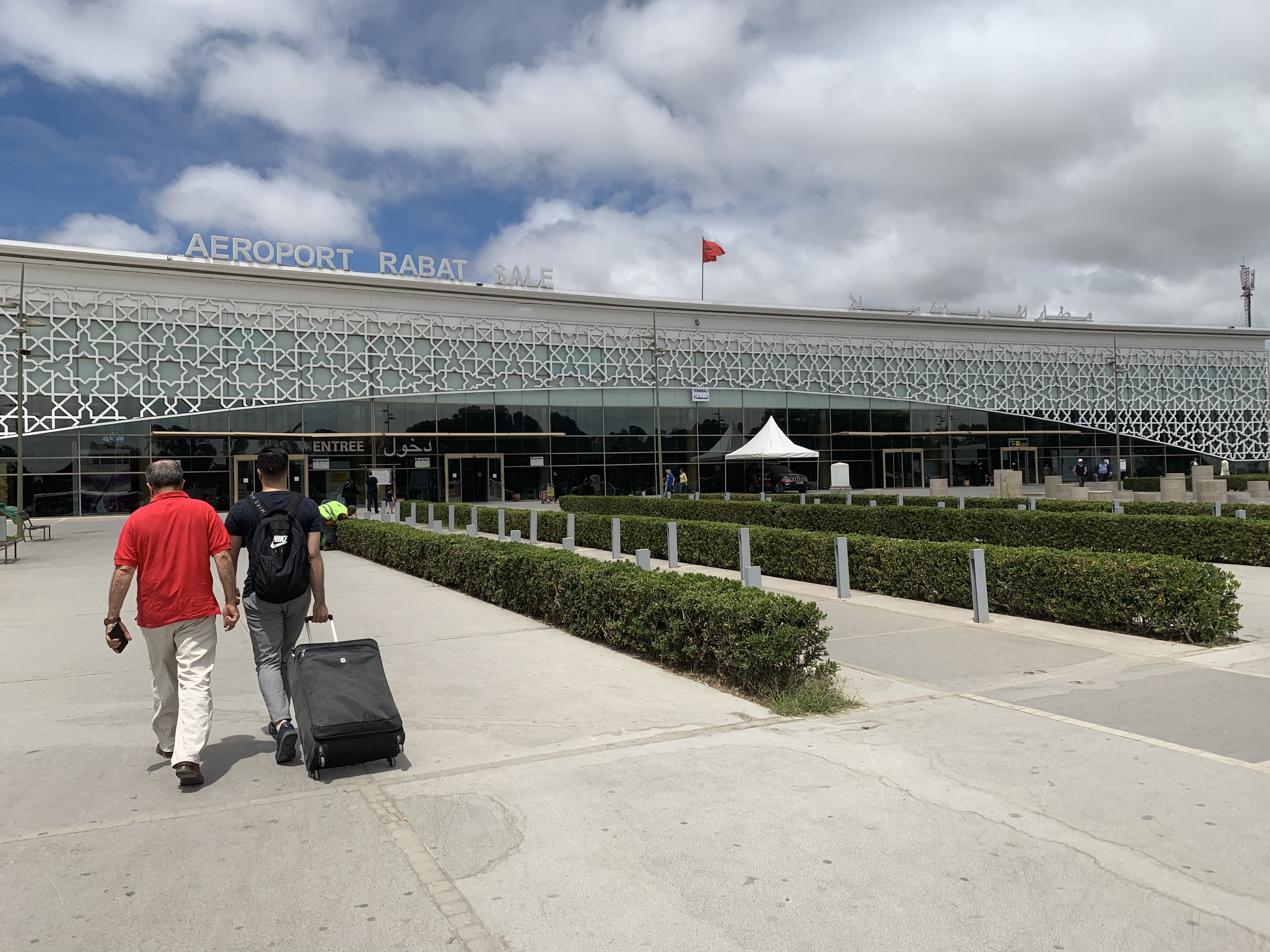
- IATA: RBA; ICAO: GMME

Summary
- Airport type: Public / military
- Operator: Airports of Morocco
- Serves: Salé and Rabat, Morocco
- Location: Salé, Morocco
- Elevation AMSL: 276 ft (84 m)
- Coordinates: 34°03′05″N 006°45′05″W
- Website: www.onda.ma/en/Our-Airports/Rabat-Sale-Airport

Map
- Location of airport in Morocco

Runways
| Direction | Length | | Surface |
| Direction | m | ft | Surface |
|---|---|---|---|
| 03/21 | 3,500 | 11,483 | Asphalt |

Statistics (2023)
- Passengers: 2,169,189
- Passenger change 2024-2025: ▲25.69%
- Source: DAFIF

Salé Airport or Rabat–Salé Airport (IATA: RBA, ICAO: GMME) is an international airport located in the city of Salé, also serving Rabat, the capital city of Morocco and of the Rabat-Salé-Kénitra region. It is a joint-use public and military airport, also hosting the First Air Base of the Royal Moroccan Air Force. The airport is located about 8 kilometres (5 mi) east-northeast of Rabat and about 90 km (56 mi) northeast of Casablanca.

== History ==
During World War II, the airport was used as a military airfield by both the Royal Air Force and the United States Army Air Forces. The 319th Bombardment Group briefly flew Martin B-26 Marauders from the airfield between 25 April and 1 June 1943. After the Americans moved out their combat units in mid-1943, the airport was used as a stopover and landing field for Air Transport Command aircraft on the Casablanca-Algiers transport route. When the war ended, control of the airfield was returned to civil authorities.

During the early years of the Cold War, the United States Air Force's Strategic Air Command (SAC) used the airport as headquarters for its 5th and 316th Air Divisions. Various SAC aircraft, primarily B-47 Stratojets and KC-97 Stratofreighters used the airport until the United States Air Force withdrew from Morocco in 1957.

== Facilities ==
=== Terminals ===
On 20 January 2012 a new Terminal 1 building was inaugurated, and the old terminal building (always called Terminal 2) closed. The terminal is 16,000 square meters and has a maximum capacity of 3.5 million passengers/year, more than twice the capacity of the original terminal.

The public area (arrivals exit and check-in) offers car rental agencies, banks (for Tax Free Shopping reimbursements only), ATMs, café-bar with small kiosk, phone/fax service. The departure lounge offers a café-bar, duty-free shop, telephones, smoking lounge. Access to the airport is possible by taxi or bus or private car; parking space is available.

Rabat–Salé is one of the six airports in Morocco where ONDA offers its special VIP service Salon Convives de Marque.

The freight terminal covers an area of 1360 m^{2}.

In 2018, expansion work began at the airport. It is estimated that after the expansion the airport will be able to host 4 million passengers. As of 2026, the new terminal is nearing completion, and will be ready for the 2030 football world cup.

=== Apron ===
An area of 84.000 m^{2} is available for passenger aircraft offering four jetways and 10 stands. The stands can receive 1 × Boeing 747, 3 × Boeing 737, 2 × Airbus A310 and 4 × Airbus A320.

=== Runway ===
The single runway lies in direction 03/21, and is 3,500 meters long and 45 meters wide. The airport has an ILS Class 1 certification and offers the following radionavigational aids: VOR, DME, and NDB.

== Airlines and destinations ==
The following airlines operate regular scheduled and charter flights at Rabat–Salé Airport:

| Airlines | Destinations |
|---|---|
| Air Arabia | Agadir, Barcelona, Basel/Mulhouse, Brussels, Essaouira, Istanbul, Nador, Oujda, Paris–Charles de Gaulle |
| Air France | Paris–Charles de Gaulle |
| British Airways | London–Gatwick |
| easyJet | Bordeaux, Geneva, London-Luton (begins 5 November 2026), Lyon, Málaga, Milan–Malpensa, Nantes, Nice, Paris–Charles de Gaulle |
| Flynas | Jeddah |
| Nouvelair | Tunis |
| Royal Air Maroc | Brussels, Dakhla, Errachidia, Laayoune, Paris–Orly; Seasonal: Paris–Charles de Gaulle |
| Ryanair | Barcelona, Brussels-Charleroi, Dublin, Frankfurt-Hahn, Karlsruhe/Baden–Baden, Kraków, London–Stansted, Madrid, Málaga, Manchester, Marseille, Milan-Bergamo, Nuremberg, Paris-Beauvais, Pisa, Porto, Rome–Ciampino, Seville, Stockholm–Arlanda, Toulouse, Valencia, Weeze |
| Transavia | Amsterdam, Montpellier, Paris–Orly |
| TUI fly Belgium | Brussels, Paris–Orly |

== Ground transportation ==
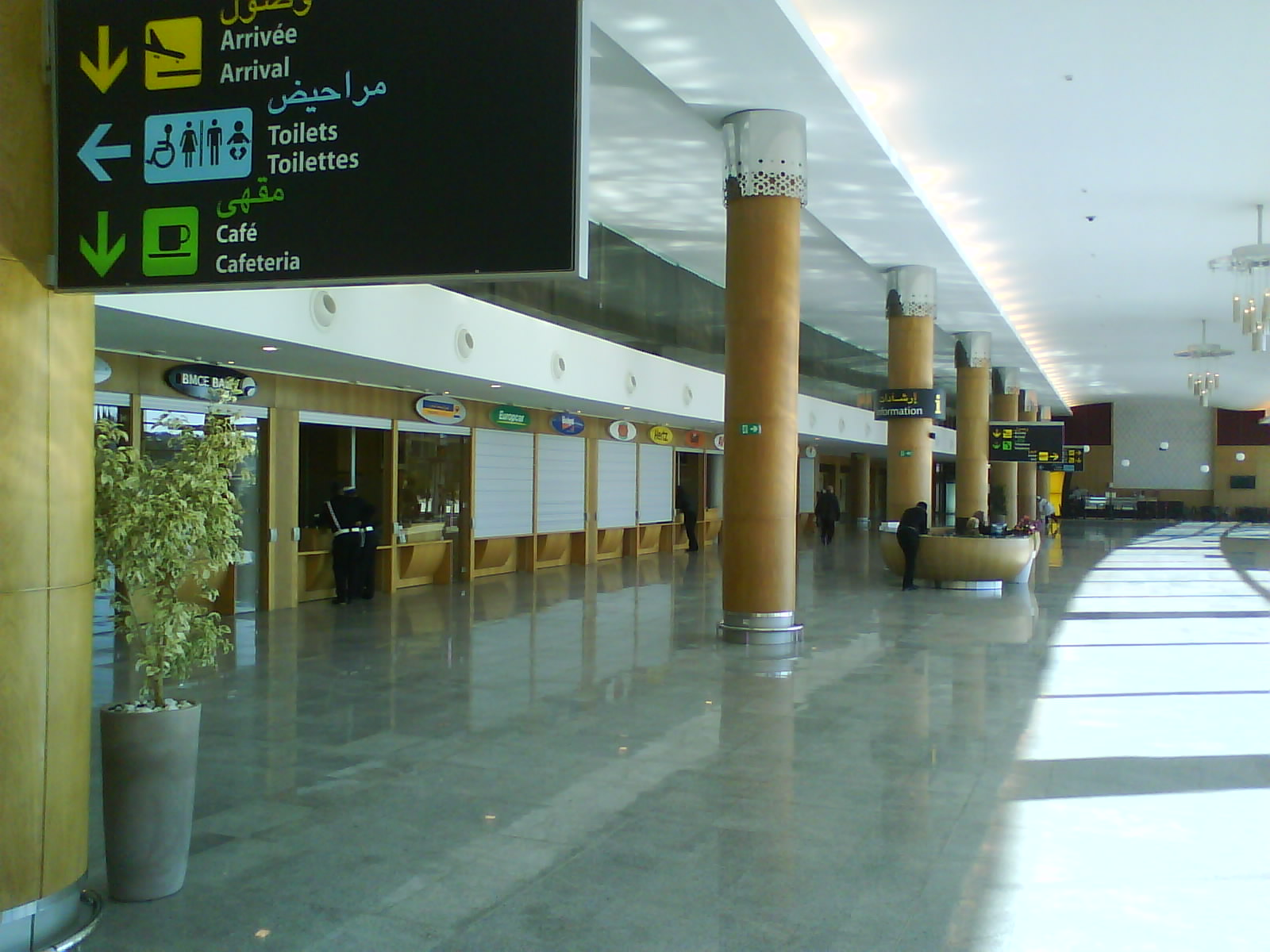
Public area of the new Terminal 1

To get from the airport to city center Rabat:

- by taxi for 200 Dh (MAD) about 20 euro (21 US dollars)
- by airport bus shuttle: express bus shuttle from the airport to the central train station Rabat City and also to the train station Rabat Agdal (the TGV station in Rabat, TGV=high speed train), priced at 25 dhs (MAD), about 2,50 euros, operated by the company Alsa-City-Bus, scheduled every 1 hour
- by private shuttle: private shuttle from the airport to Rabat center, priced between 300 and 500 dhs (MAD), about 30 and 50 euros
- by local bus: Line No. 10, but one has to walk outside, out of the airport, 20 minutes walk to the bus station next to supermarket ATACADAO, bus ticket price is 5 dh (MAD) about 0,50 euro
- by tramway: Line No. 2, but one has to walk outside, out of the airport, 25 minutes walk to the tramway station named Hssain next to supermarket ATACADAO, tramway ticket is 6 dh (MAD) about 0,60 euro

== Statistics ==
| 2010 | 2011 | 2012 | 2013 | 2014 | 2015 | 2016 | 2017 | 2018 | 2019 | 2020 | 2021 | 2022 | 2023 | 2024 | 2025 |
|---|---|---|---|---|---|---|---|---|---|---|---|---|---|---|---|
| 357,773 | 372,145 ▲4,02% | 351,867 ▼5,45% | 485,713 ▲38,04% | 684,213 ▲40,87% | 705,950 ▲3,18% | 873,169 ▲23,69% | 923,576 ▲5,77% | 987,485 ▲6,79% | 1,100,846 ▲22,13% | 299,333 ▼72,81% | 468,875 ▲56,60% | 873,305 ▲86,26% | 1,201,676 ▲38,01% | 1,725,812 ▲42,90% | 2,169,189 ▲25,69% |

== Incidents and accidents ==
- On 12 July 1961, a Czech Airlines (CSA) Ilyushin Il-18 en route from Zurich Airport to Rabat–Salé Airport diverted to Casablanca Anfa Airport (GMMC) after receiving weather info indicating ground fog at Rabat–Salé. As the conditions at GMMC were also poor the captain of the plane asked permission to land at Casablanca–Nouasseur (CMN), then a USAF base. While GMMC controllers contacted American authorities the plane crashed 13 km SSW of GMMC. All 72 on board (64 passengers, 8 crew) died. The exact reason for the crash was never discovered.
- On 12 September 1961, an Air France Sud Aviation Caravelle was en route from Paris–Orly to Rabat–Salé Airport. The weather conditions at the time were non-favourable: thick fog and low visibility. The pilot informed traffic control it intended to land using the non-directional beacon (NDB). Traffic control warned the pilot that the NDB was not in-line with the runway, but this message received no response. The aircraft crashed 9 km SSW of the airport. All 77 on board (71 passengers, 6 crew) died. The exact reason was never discovered but investigators reported errors in instrument reading as the most likely reason.
