= Sania Ramel Airport =

Airport serving Tétouan, Morocco

Sania Ramel Airport مطار تطوان سانية الرمل (Arabic)
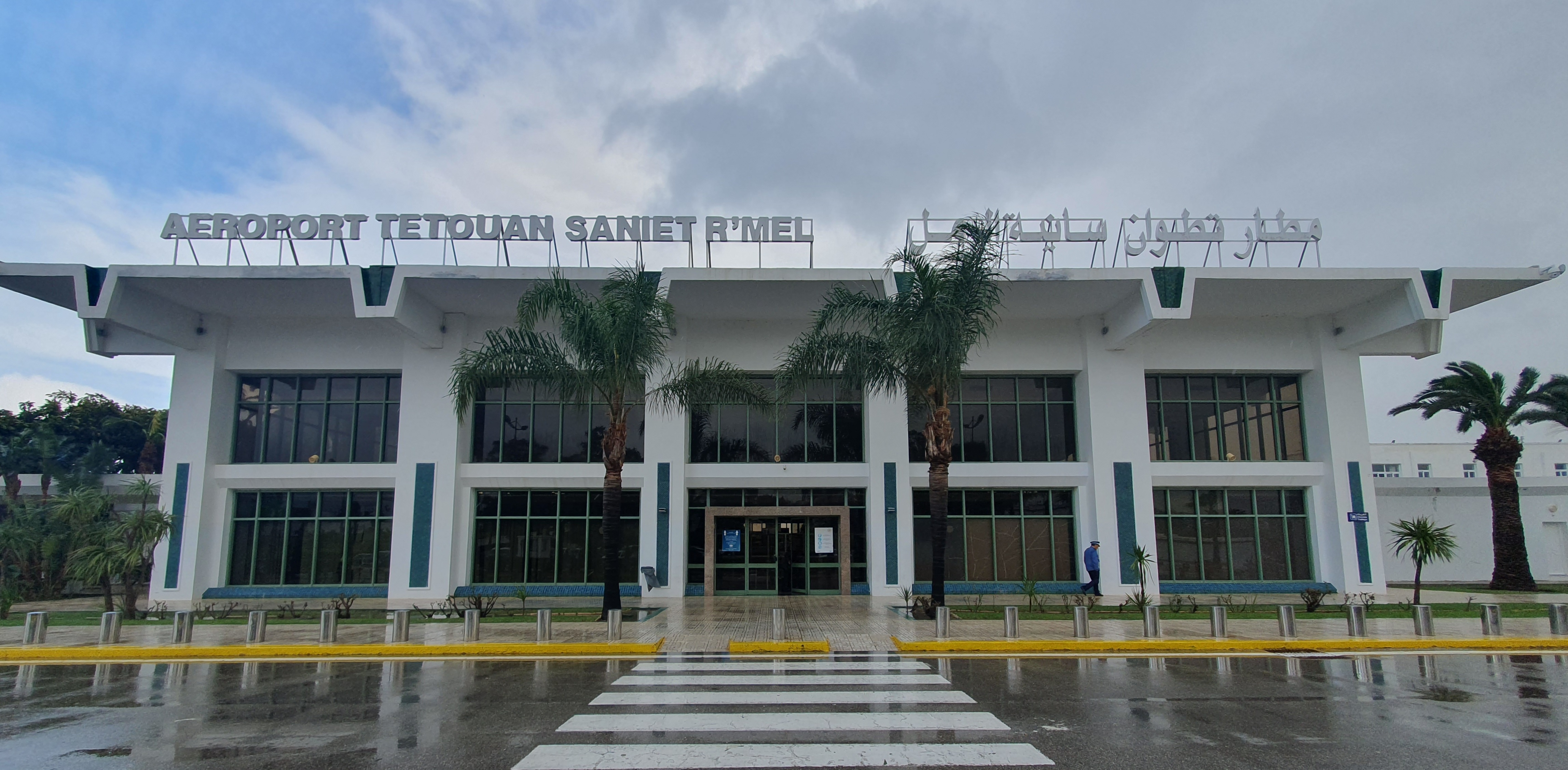
- IATA: TTU; ICAO: GMTN

Summary
- Airport type: Public
- Operator: ONDA
- Serves: Tétouan, Morocco; Ceuta, Spain
- Elevation AMSL: 10 ft (3.0 m)
- Coordinates: 35°35′40″N 005°19′12″W

Map
- Location of airport in Morocco

Runways
Direction	Length		Surface
Direction	m	ft	Surface
06/24	2,300	7,546	Asphalt
07/25	3,285	10,778	Aspahlt

Statistics (2023)
- Aircraft movements: 2,147
- Passengers: 253,552
- Passenger change 22-23: ▲534.2%
- Sources: ONDA, DAFIF

Sania Ramel Airport (Arabic: مطار تطوان سانية الرمل, French: Aéroport Tétouan – Sania R'mel) (IATA: TTU, ICAO: GMTN) is an airport serving Tétouan, a city in the Tanger-Tetouan-Al Hoceima region in Morocco. It is also the closest airport to the Spanish city of Ceuta (which only has a heliport). The airport served over 250,000 passengers in 2023.

== History ==
Sania Ramel was the first military airfield built in the Spanish Protectorate of Morocco. It was located near the main Spanish Army camps in Tetouan and started operations in October–November 1913. Despite the small size of the facilities (700 x 350 meters) it became a key element in the Spanish military effort on the West front of the Rif War, even if it was prone to flooding in winter.

On 1 July 1927, civilian operations started in the airfield, which became a stopover in the postal flight route between Larache and Seville for some months that year. After the stop in Tetouan was cancelled, it is not known if more civilian flights continued to use the facilities.

It also played a relevant role in the beginning of the Spanish Civil War. In the early morning of 18 July 1936, the commander of the military air base, Ricardo de la Puente Bahamonde (Francisco Franco's cousin), refused to join the uprising against the government of the Republic. Nevertheless, lacking reinforcements from Madrid, he had to surrender to the rebels after a few hours of combat (he would be subsequently executed in August by the new Nationalist authorities in the Mount Hacho Fortress in Ceuta; Franco did nothing to prevent it). Before surrendering the base, De la Puente managed to render useless all the Breguet bombers parked there. On the following day, 19 July, the de Havilland Dragon Rapide flying Francisco Franco from the Canary Islands landed in Sania Ramel, where the senior rebel officers welcomed him. Franco assumed command of the Spanish Army in Morocco. They held an improvised conference around the plane.

The most important contribution of the Sania Ramel airfield to the Nationalist war effort during the Spanish Civil War was its role in the airlift that flew most of the Army of Africa into mainland Spain. It was the world's first long-range combat airlift. At that time, the rebels in Spanish Morocco were being blocked by the Spanish fleet which remained mostly loyal to the government and the Army of Africa, the only professional army in Spain, was key to secure the rebellion in mainland Spain. On 23 July a German Lufthansa plane, which had been requisitioned by the rebels, took off from Sania Ramel taking Franco's delegation to Berlin. Its purpose was to convince Hitler to supply the rebels with transport aircraft. On 28 July, the Ju 52 that took the delegation back to Tetouan started the airlift into the Tablada airfield in Seville, running four flights a day. On 31 July, the first three Ju 52 (out of the ten promised by Hitler) arrived to Tetouan. The following ones arrived some days later. A dummy company (HISMA) was set up in Tetouan to provide a cover up for the operation. It was to be known as Operation Magic Fire. Together with the Italian Air Force Savoia-Marchetti SM.81 supplied by Mussolini, the airlift carried about 13,000 soldiers and 270 tons of cargo until the operation was completed in November.

Before the start of the Spanish Civil War, a paved runway was built which enabled Sania Ramel to serve as civil airport for Tetouan. Thus, after the end of the HISMA operations, Iberia took charge of the passenger and cargo operations in Sania Ramel. Initially, two routes were established. One from Tetouan to Zaragoza, and another one to Vitoria. The Tetouan airport continued to be relevant for the new regime and despite fuel supply restrictions two routes continued to make stopovers at Sania Ramel during the early post-war period: Madrid-Seville-Tetouan-Melilla and Seville-Tetouan-Canary Islands. Although by 1943 only the former route kept operating, the airport was enlarged.

After Morocco's independence in 1957, the airport was transferred to the new administration, after which it started to decline. Only small aircraft currently land at the Sania Ramel facilities and even if there were plans to make greater use of the airport, urban development in the surrounding areas would make it unfeasible.

== Facilities ==
Aircraft parking space of 11,300 square metres (121,632 sq ft) supports two ATR 42 and Boeing 737-800s. The air terminal is 1,200 m^{2} (12,917 sq ft) and designed to handle 300,000 passengers per year.

The paved runway is laid out in the direction 06/24 and measures 2,300 by 45 metres (7,546 ft × 148 ft). It can receive aircraft up to the size of a Boeing 737-800 or Airbus A320. The airport offers the following radio navigation aids: VOR – DME.

== Airlines and destinations ==
The following airlines operate regular scheduled and charter flights at Tétouan Airport:

Airlines	Destinations
Air Arabia	Amsterdam
Royal Air Maroc	Barcelona, Brussels, Casablanca, London–Gatwick, Paris–Charles de Gaulle, Madrid, Málaga
Royal Air Maroc Express	Al Hoceima, Casablanca
Ryanair	Alicante, Charleroi, Madrid, Málaga, Marrakesh; Seasonal: Marseille, Seville
TUI fly Belgium	Brussels

== Statistics ==
Subject	2003	2004	2005	2006	2007	2008
Aircraft movements	110	188	152	198	297	356
Passengers	1,065	13,138	10,948	14,788	18,979	24,010
