= Zagora Airport =

Zagora Airport مطار زاكورة (Arabic)
- IATA: OZG; ICAO: GMAZ

Summary
- Airport type: Public
- Serves: Zagora
- Elevation AMSL: 2,415 ft / 736 m
- Coordinates: 30°16′00″N 05°51′26″W

Map
- Location of airport in Morocco

Runways
| Direction | Length | | Surface |
| Direction | m | ft | Surface |
|---|---|---|---|
| 11/29 | 3,005 | 9,859 | Asphalt |
- Source: Google Maps GCM

Zagora Airport (IATA: OZG, ICAO: GMAZ) is an airport serving Zagora, Morocco. The current airport was constructed between 2007 and 2009, 7 kilometres (4.3 mi) south-southwest of Zagora.

The previous facility sat at 30°19′13″N 005°52′00″W, with a sand runway of 1,140 metres (3,740 ft) length.

The Zagora VOR-DME (Ident: unavailable) is located 0.65 nautical miles (1.2 km) off the approach threshold of Runway 29. The Zagora non-directional beacon (Ident: FJA) is located on the field.

== Airlines and destinations ==
The following airlines operate regular scheduled and charter flights at Zagora Airport:

| Airlines | Destinations |
|---|---|
| Royal Air Maroc Express | Casablanca, Ouarzazate |

== See also ==
- Transport in Morocco
- List of airports in Morocco
