= Dakhla Airport =

Dakhla Airport مطار الداخلة (Arabic)
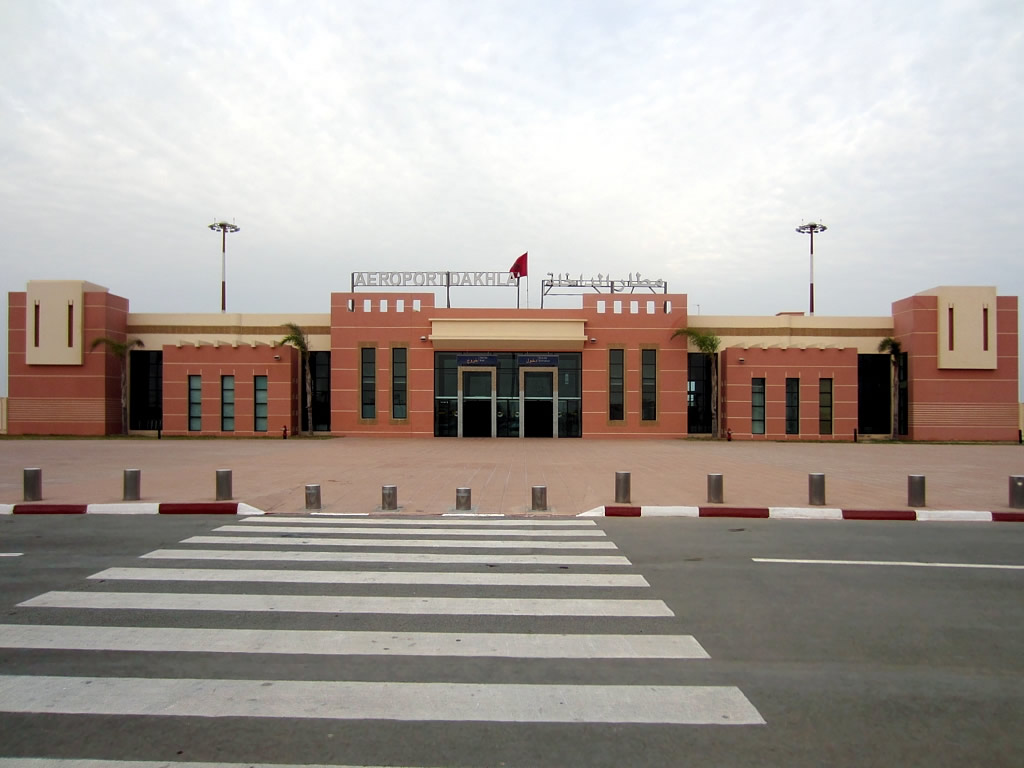
- IATA: VIL; ICAO: GMMH/GSVO

Summary
- Airport type: Public / Military
- Operator: Airports of Morocco; Royal Moroccan Air Force (RMAF)
- Serves: Dakhla
- Location: Western Sahara
- Elevation AMSL: 36 ft (11 m)
- Coordinates: 23°43′05″N 015°55′55″W

Map
- Location of airport in Western Sahara

Runways
Direction	Length		Surface
Direction	m	ft	Surface
03/21	3,000	9,842	Asphalt

Statistics (2008, 2016)
- Aircraft movements: 1,574
- Passengers (2016): 154,451 ▲
- Cargo (tonnes): 34.43
- Sources: ONDA, DAFIF

Dakhla Airport (IATA: VIL, ICAO: GMMH/GSVO) is an airport serving Dakhla (also known as Dajla or ad-Dakhla, formerly Villa Cisneros), a city in Western Sahara, a disputed territory occupied by Morocco. (See Political status of Western Sahara)

The airport is operated by the Moroccan state-owned company Airports of Morocco.

== History ==
During World War II, the airport was used by the United States Army Air Forces Air Transport Command as a stopover for cargo, transiting aircraft and personnel on the North African Cairo-Dakar transport route for cargo, transiting aircraft and personnel. It connected to Dakar Airport in the South and Agadir Airport to the north.. Spanish flag carrier Iberia had regular scheduled flights to the airport, for example in Winter 1970-1971, there were daily flights from Las Palmas.

== Airport and facilities ==
The Dakhla airport is used as public airport and by the Royal Moroccan Air Force. The 3 km (1.9 mi) long runway can receive a Boeing 737 or smaller planes. Parking space of 18,900 square metres (203,000 sq ft) or one Boeing 737.

The passenger terminal covers 670 square metres (7,200 sq ft) and is capable to handle up to 55,000 passengers per year. Public facilities available include a medical post and a prayer room.

The airport offers the following radio-navigation aids: VOR and DME.

== Airlines and destinations ==
The following airlines operate regular scheduled and charter flights at Dakhla Airport:

Airlines	Destinations
Binter Canarias	Gran Canaria
Royal Air Maroc	Agadir, Casablanca, Laayoune, Marrakesh, Paris–Orly, Rabat
Ryanair	Madrid
Transavia	Paris–Orly

== Traffic statistics ==
Item	2008	2007	2006	2005	2004	2003
Aircraft movements	1,574	1,492	839	674	606	492
Passengers	42,066	36,354	21,253	21,442	11,670	12,149
Cargo (tonnes)	34.43	48.63	59.77	61.06	140.96	107.81

== Accidents and incidents ==
- In November 1949, a Savoia-Marchetti SM-95C (I-LATI) of LATI sustained substantial damage in a landing accident here, but was later repaired. All 17 occupants survived.
