= Cherif Al Idrissi Airport =

Airport in Morocco

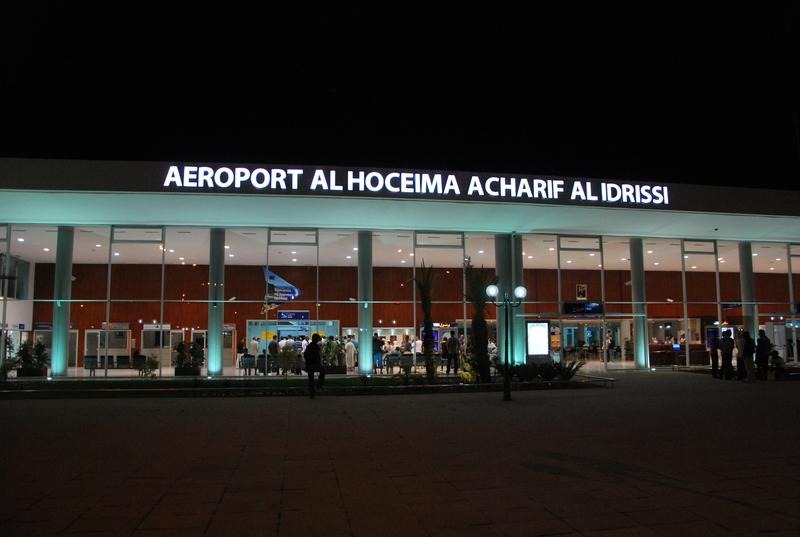
- IATA: AHU; ICAO: GMTA

Summary
- Airport type: Public
- Operator: ONDA
- Serves: Al Hoceima, Morocco
- Elevation AMSL: 95 ft (29 m)
- Coordinates: 35°10′37″N 003°50′22″W

Map
- Location of the airport in Morocco

Runways
Direction	Length		Surface
Direction	m	ft	Surface
17/35	2,500	8,202	Asphalt
- Source: DAFIF

Cherif Al Idrissi Airport (Arabic: مطار الشريف الإدريسي, French: Aéroport Al Hoceïma - Cherif-Al-Idrissi) (IATA: AHU, ICAO: GMTA) is an international airport serving Al Hoceima, Morocco. It is the second-busiest airport in the Tangier-Tetouan-Al Hoceima region of northern Morocco. The airport is named after the 12th century CE Moroccan geographer and cartographer Al-Idrisi (1100–1165).

== Facilities ==
The airport resides at an elevation of 95 feet (29 m) above mean sea level. It has one runway designated 17/35 with an asphalt surface measuring 2,500 by 45 metres (8,202 ft × 148 ft).

== Airlines and destinations ==
The following airlines operate regular scheduled and charter flights at Al Hoceima Cherif Al Idrissi Airport:

Airlines	Destinations
Corendon Dutch Airlines	Seasonal: Rotterdam/The Hague; Seasonal charter: Maastricht/Aachen
Royal Air Maroc	Seasonal: Amsterdam, Brussels
Royal Air Maroc Express	Casablanca, Tangier, Tetouan
Transavia	Rotterdam/The Hague
TUI fly Belgium	Brussels
