= Ouarzazate Airport =

Ouarzazate Airport مطار ورزازات (Arabic)
- IATA: OZZ; ICAO: GMMZ

Summary
- Airport type: Public
- Operator: ONDA
- Location: Ouarzazate, Morocco
- Elevation AMSL: 3,782 ft (1,153 m)
- Coordinates: 30°56′21″N 006°54′34″W

Map
- Location of airport in Morocco

Runways
Direction	Length		Surface
Direction	m	ft	Surface
12/30	3,100	10,236	Asphalt

Statistics (2019)
- Passengers: 136,007
- Passenger change 18-19: ▲ +52.78%
- Freight (tons) 2008: 29.04
- Sources: ONDA, DAFIF

Ouarzazate Airport (Arabic: مطار ورزازات) (IATA: OZZ, ICAO: GMMZ) is an airport serving Ouarzazate, a city in the Drâa-Tafilalet region in Morocco. The airport served 52,791 passengers in 2016.

== Facilities ==
Aircraft parking space of 56,311 square metres (606,127 sq ft) supports up to three Boeing 747s or seven Boeing 737s. The air terminal is 3,200 m^{2} (34,445 sq ft) and designed to handle 260,000 passengers per year.

The paved runway is laid out in the direction 12/30 and measures 3,100 by 45 metres (10,171 ft × 148 ft). It can receive all modern jetliners up to the Boeing 747 in size. The airport is equipped with an ILS Cat II landing system and offers the following radio navigation aids: DME.

== Airlines and destinations ==
The following airlines operate regular scheduled and charter flights at Ouarzazate Airport:

Airlines	Destinations
Royal Air Maroc Express	Casablanca, Zagora
Ryanair	Barcelona, Marseille
Transavia	Paris–Orly
