= Hassan I Airport =

Airport in Western Sahara

Hassan I Airport Laayoune Airport مطار الحسن الأول (Arabic)
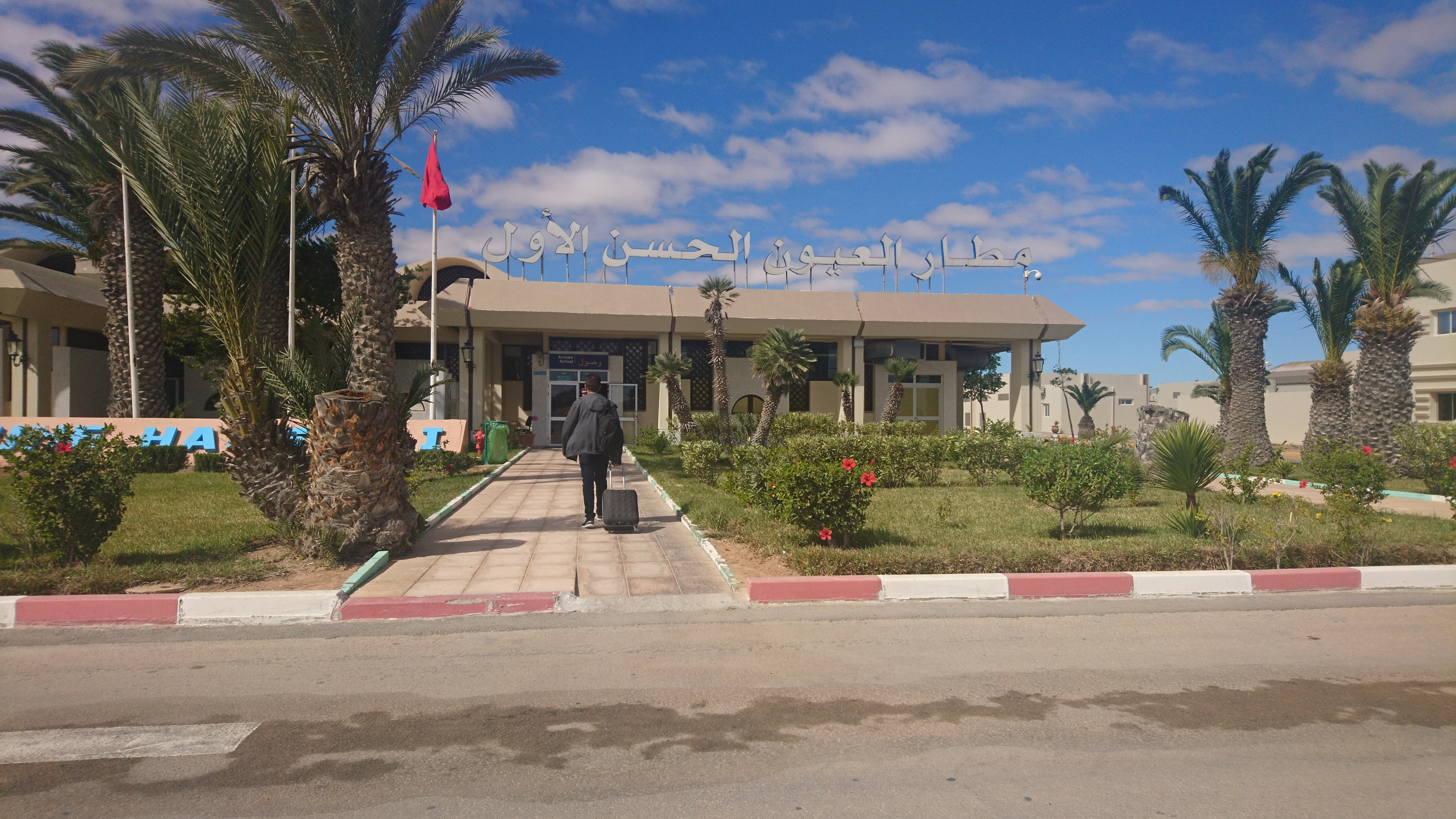
- IATA: EUN; ICAO: GMML

Summary
- Airport type: Public/Military
- Operator: Airports of Morocco
- Serves: Laayoune
- Location: Western Sahara
- Elevation AMSL: 207 ft (63 m)
- Coordinates: 27°09′06″N 013°13′09″W

Map
- Location of airport in Western Sahara

Runways
| Direction | Length | | Surface |
| Direction | m | ft | Surface |
|---|---|---|---|
| 02/20 | 2,701 | 8,861 | Asphalt |
| 04/22 | 2,500 | 8,202 | Asphalt |

Statistics (2019)
- Passengers: 255,610
- Passenger change 18-19: ▲ +15.25%
- Cargo (tonnes) 2008: 498.46
- Sources: ONDA, DAFIF

Hassan I Airport (Arabic: مطار الحسن الأول, French: Aéroport international Laâyoune – Hassan I^{er}, IATA: EUN, ICAO: GMML) is an airport serving Laayoune, the largest city in Western Sahara. The airport is named after Hassan I of Morocco. It is operated by the Moroccan state-owned company Airports of Morocco. Due to the particular political situation of Western Sahara, this airport appears in the Moroccan AIP as GMML and in the Spanish AIP as GSAI.

== Airlines and destinations ==
The following airlines operate regular scheduled and charter flights at Laayoune Airport:

| Airlines | Destinations |
|---|---|
| Binter Canarias | Gran Canaria |
| Royal Air Maroc | Agadir, Casablanca, Dakhla, Gran Canaria, Marrakesh, Rabat |

== Accidents and incidents ==
- On 4 December 1976, a Lockheed C-130H Hercules (CN-AOB) of the Royal Moroccan Air Force was reportedly shot down by rebels near here after departure. It is unknown if there were any fatalities.

== See also ==
- Legal status of Western Sahara
