= Essaouira-Mogador Airport =

Airport in Essaouira, Morocco

Essaouira-Mogador Airport مطار الصويرة موكادور (Arabic)
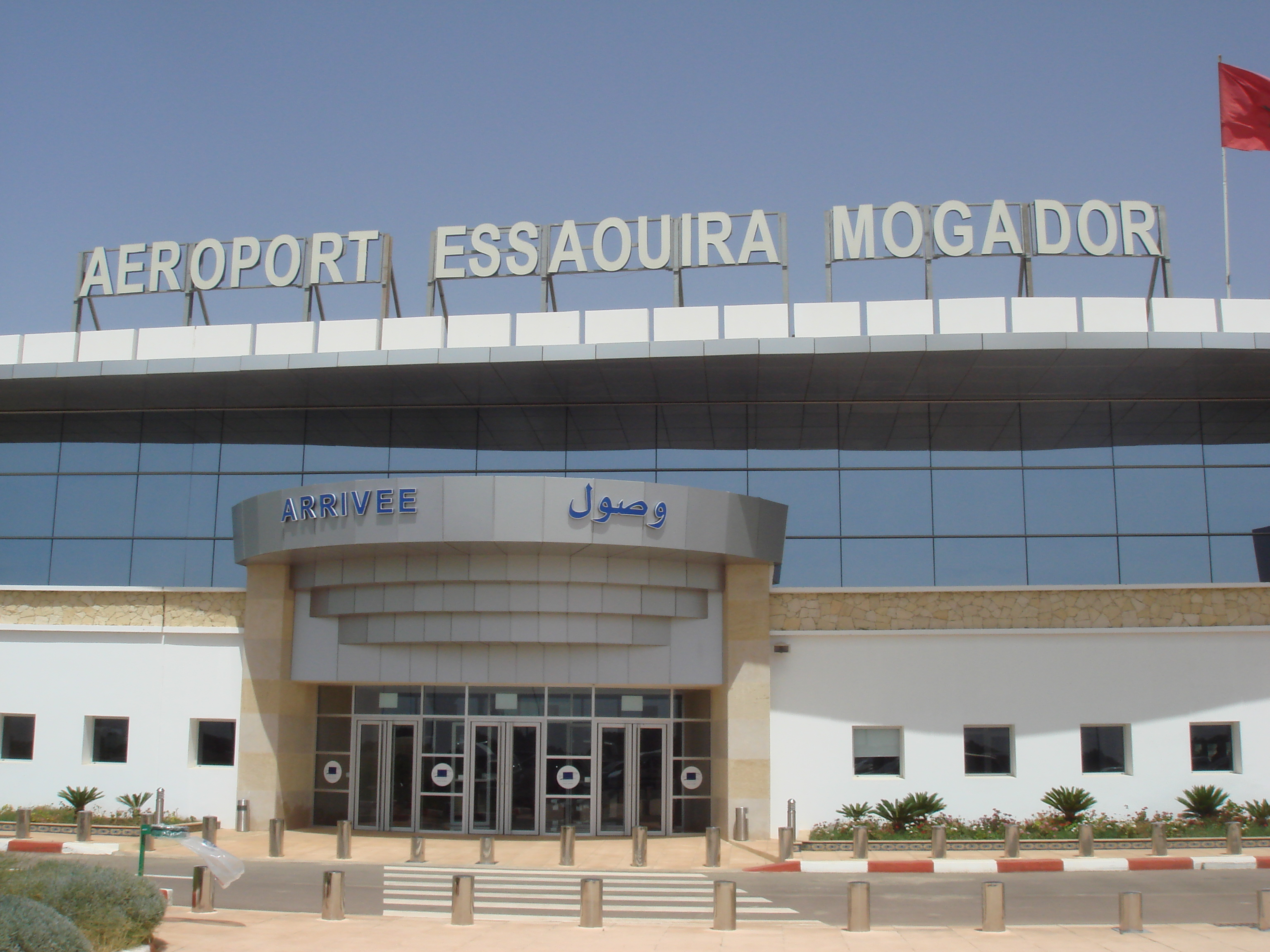
- IATA: ESU; ICAO: GMMI

Summary
- Airport type: Public
- Operator: Airports of Morocco
- Serves: Essaouira, Morocco
- Elevation AMSL: 384 ft (117 m)
- Coordinates: 31°23′51″N 009°40′54″W

Map
- Location of airport in Morocco

Runways
Direction	Length		Surface
Direction	m	ft	Surface
16/34	2,100	6,890	Asphalt/Bitumen
- Source: DAFIF

Essaouira-Mogador Airport (Arabic: مطار الصويرة موكادور) (IATA: ESU, ICAO: GMMI) is an international airport serving Essaouira (formerly known as Mogador), a city in the Marrakesh-Safi region in Morocco. The airport is 15 km or 9.3 miles from the city center.

== Facilities ==
The airport is at an elevation of 384 feet (117 m) above mean sea level. It has one runway designated 16/34 with an asphalt/bitumen surface measuring 2,100 by 45 metres (6,890 ft × 148 ft).

== Airlines and destinations ==
The following airlines operate regular scheduled and charter flights at Essaouira Airport:

Airlines	Destinations
Air Arabia	Rabat
easyJet	Seasonal: Bordeaux, Lyon, Nantes (begins 27 October 2026),
Ryanair	Beauvais, Charleroi, London–Stansted, Madrid, Marseille, Weeze
Transavia	Paris–Orly; Seasonal: Nantes
Vueling	Seasonal: Barcelona, Seville

== Ground transportation ==
To get from the airport to city center Essaouira:

- by taxi for 150 Dh (MAD) about 15 euro (16 US dollars)
- by local bus for 8 Dh (MAD) about 0.70 euro (0.80 US dollars), bus N° 2 has a stop outside airport, this bus route is between Bab doukkala and Sidi kaouki.
