= Tan Tan Airport =

Tan Tan Airport مطار طانطان الشاطئ الأبيض (Arabic)
- IATA: TTA; ICAO: GMAT

Summary
- Airport type: Public / Military
- Serves: Tan Tan, Morocco
- Elevation AMSL: 653 ft (199 m)
- Coordinates: 28°26′54″N 011°09′41″W

Map
- Location of airport in Morocco

Runways
Direction	Length		Surface
Direction	m	ft	Surface
03/21	2,000	6,562	Asphalt
- Source: DAFIF

Tan Tan Airport (Arabic: مطار طانطان الشاطئ الأبيض ) (IATA: TTA, ICAO: GMAT), also known as Plage Blanche Airport, is an airport near Tan Tan, a city in the Guelmim-Oued Noun region in Morocco. The airport is used for military and civil aviation.

== Facilities ==
The airport resides at an elevation of 653 feet (199 m) above mean sea level. It has one runway designate 03/21 with an asphalt surface measuring 2,000 by 30 metres (6,562 ft × 98 ft). It has the following radio-navigation aids: NDB and VOR. The runway is suitable for light (private) jets and turbo-prop aircraft.

== Airlines and destinations ==
The following airlines operate regular scheduled and charter flights at Tan Tan Airport:

Airlines	Destinations
Royal Air Maroc Express	Casablanca

== Statistics ==
Subject	2003	2005	2006
Passengers	27	1082	917
Freight (tons)	7	-	-
Aircraft movements	18	104	132

== Accidents and incidents ==
On 26 July 2011 a Royal Moroccan Armed Forces Hercules C-130 transport plane crashed six miles from the airport, where it had planned a stop-over on a flight from Dakhla to Kenitra. All six crew, 60 soldiers, and 12 civilians on board died.
