= Tangier Ibn Battouta Airport =

Airport in Tangier, Morocco

Tangier Ibn Battouta Airport مطار طنجة ابن بطوطة (Arabic)
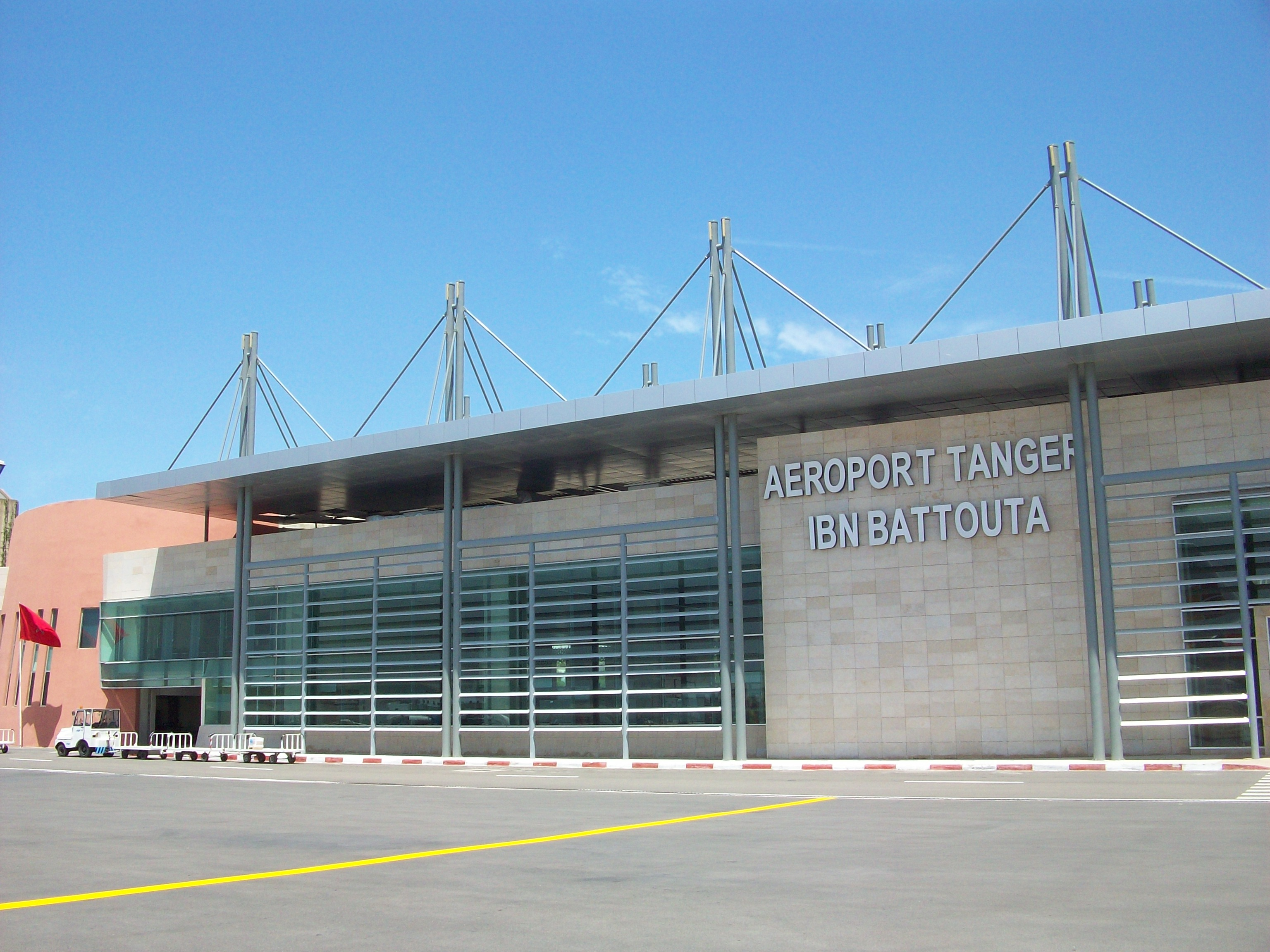
- IATA: TNG; ICAO: GMTT

Summary
- Airport type: Public
- Operator: Airports of Morocco
- Location: Tangier, Morocco
- Focus city for: Air Arabia Maroc; Royal Air Maroc
- Elevation AMSL: 62 ft (19 m)
- Coordinates: 35°43′37″N 005°55′01″W
- Website: onda.ma

Map
- Location of airport in Morocco

Runways
| Direction | Length | | Surface |
| Direction | m | ft | Surface |
|---|---|---|---|
| 10/28 | 3,500 | 11,483 | Asphalt |
| ~~7/25~~ (CLOSED) | ~~2,000~~ | ~~6,562~~ | ~~Asphalt~~ |

Statistics (2019)
- Passengers: 1,353,860
- Passenger change 18-19: ▲ +20%
- Freight (tons) 2017: 587.78
- Sources: ONDA, DAFIF

Tangier Ibn Battouta Airport (Arabic: مطار طنجة ابن بطوطة) (IATA: TNG, ICAO: GMTT) is an international airport serving Tangier, the capital city of the Tanger-Tetouan-Al Hoceima region in Morocco. The airport is named after Ibn Battuta (1304–1368), a Moroccan traveller who was born in Tangier. The airport was formerly known as Tanger-Boukhalef Airport. The airport handled over 1,070,247 passengers in the year 2017.

== Facilities ==
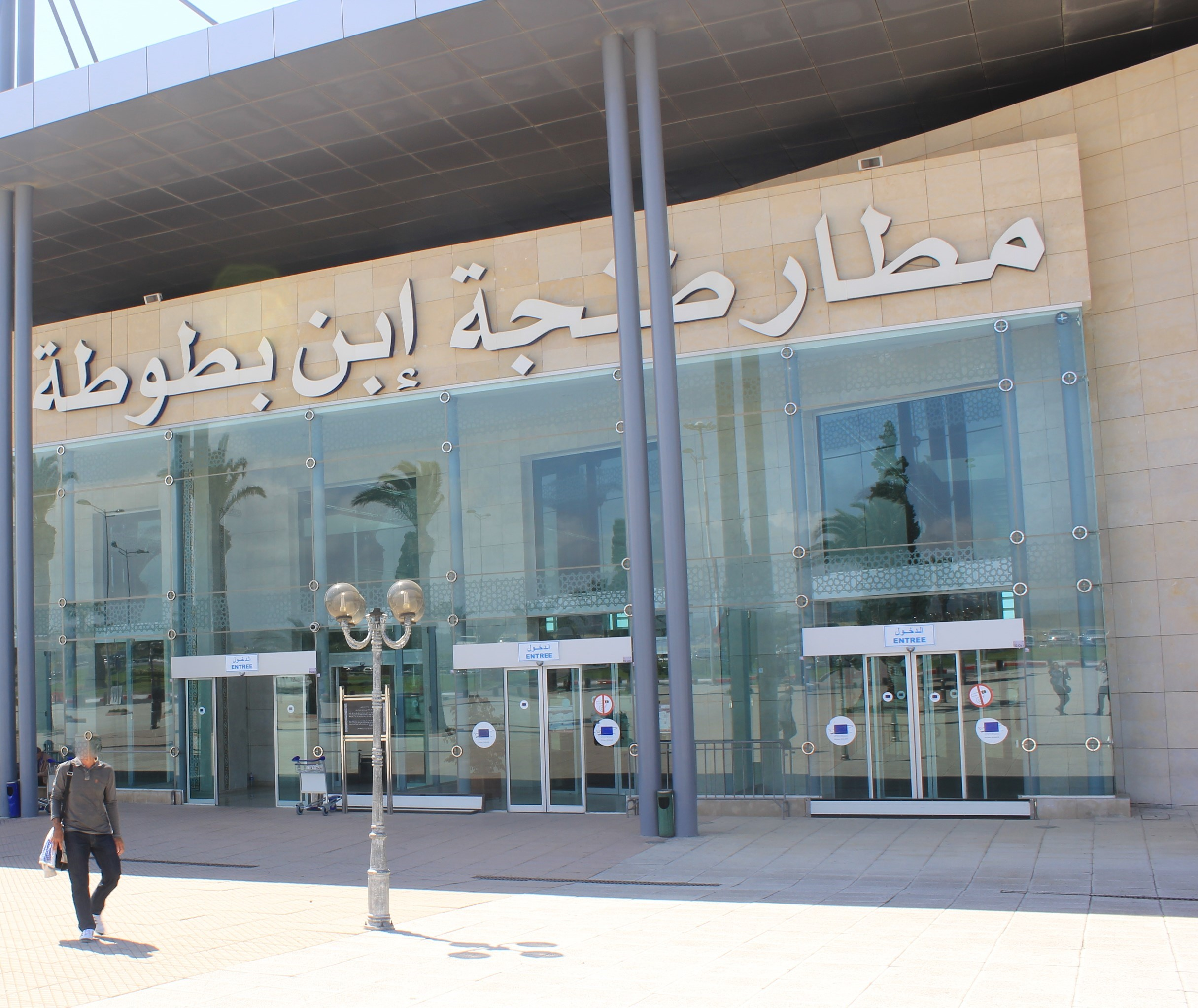
TNG - Terminal Entrance

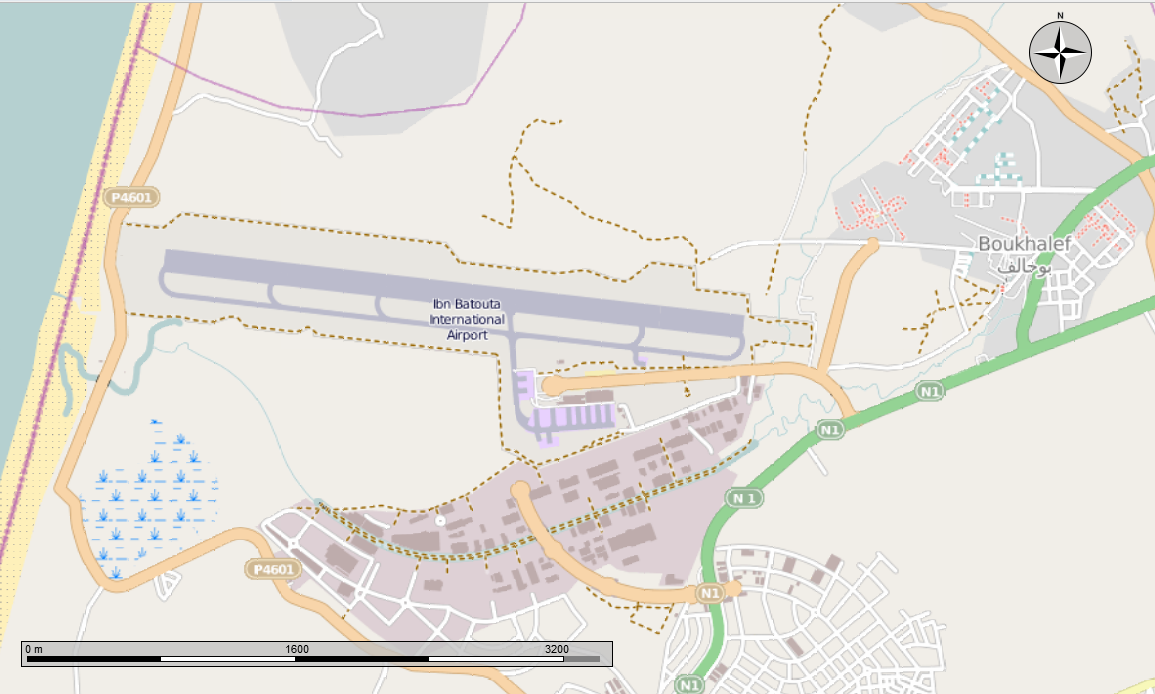
The airport

A new airport terminal building was opened in 2008 to provide for many more flights and increased passenger capability, as Tangier has grown rapidly and modernised.

Aircraft parking space of 40,640 square metres (437,445 sq ft) supports up to four Boeing 737s and one Boeing 747. For small craft two dedicated sections are assigned. The air terminal is 12,000 m^{2} (129,167 sq ft) and designed to handle 1,250,000 passengers per year. The cargo terminal is 529 m^{2} (5,694 sq ft) of covered space.

The airport has two runways but only the longer runway is in active use and 07/25 is closed. The 3500 meter long runway 10/28 is open and is capable of handling all sizes of aircraft up to the size of a Boeing 747 and Airbus A380-800.

The airport has an ILS status (Loc – Glide – DME) and offers the following radionavigational aids: VOR – DME – NDB. PAPI lighting available for runway 10/28 for approaches from either direction.

Tangier-Ibn Battouta is one of the six airports in Morocco where Airports of Marocco offers its special Salon Convives de Marque VIP service.

== Airlines and destinations ==
=== Passenger ===
The following airlines operate regular scheduled and charter flights at Tangier Airport:

| Airlines | Destinations |
|---|---|
| Air Arabia | Agadir, Amsterdam, Barcelona, Bilbao, Bordeaux, Brussels, Cologne/Bonn, Istanbul–Sabiha Gökçen, London–Gatwick, Lyon, Madrid, Montpellier, Nador, Paris–Charles de Gaulle, Rotterdam/The Hague; Seasonal: Girona |
| Air Cairo | Cairo |
| Air France | Paris–Charles de Gaulle |
| Alexandria Airlines | Seasonal charter: Sharm El Sheikh |
| Avion Express | Charter: Grenoble |
| Binter Canarias | Seasonal: Gran Canaria |
| Brussels Airlines | Seasonal: Brussels |
| easyJet | Seasonal: Basel/Mulhouse, Geneva, Lyon |
| Eurowings | Seasonal: Cologne/Bonn |
| Iberia | Madrid |
| Norwegian Air Shuttle | Seasonal: Copenhagen, Oslo |
| Royal Air Maroc | Amsterdam,^{a} Brussels,^{a} Istanbul, Paris–Orly^{b} Seasonal: Barcelona, London–Gatwick, Madrid, Rotterdam/The Hague |
| Royal Air Maroc Express | Al Hoceima, Casablanca |
| Ryanair | Agadir, Barcelona, Beauvais, Beni Mellal, Bergamo, Charleroi, Eindhoven, Karlsruhe/Baden-Baden, Lisbon, London–Stansted, Madrid, Málaga, Manchester, Marrakesh, Marseille, Memmingen, Oujda, Porto, Seville, Toulouse, Valencia, Weeze; Seasonal: Carcassonne |
| TAP Air Portugal | Seasonal: Lisbon |
| Transavia | Paris–Orly, Rotterdam/The Hague; Seasonal: Nantes |
| TUI fly Belgium | Seasonal: Antwerp, Brussels |
| Vueling | Barcelona, Paris–Orly |

^a This flight operates via Nador. However, this carrier does not sell tickets solely between Tangier and Nador.
^b This flight operates via Fez on selected days. However, this carrier does not sell tickets solely between Tangier and Fez.

=== Cargo ===
| Airlines | Destinations |
|---|---|
| DHL Aviation | Madrid |

== Statistics ==
| Traffic | 2019 | 2018 | 2017 | 2016 | 2015 | 2014 | 2011 | 2008 | 2007 | 2006 | 2005 | 2004 | 2003 | 2002 |
|---|---|---|---|---|---|---|---|---|---|---|---|---|---|---|
| Aircraft movements | ? | ? | ? | ? | ? | 5485 | 5991 | 6179 | 7092 | 7496 | 7422 | 7361 | | |
| Passengers | 1,353,860 | 1,127,573 | 1,070,247 | 848,643 | 856,818 | 853,251 | 849,882 | 484,391 | 365,750 | 292,599 | 262,698 | 256,149 | 259,466 | 268,829 |
| Freight (tons) | ? | ? | ? | ? | 587.78 | 524.79 | 628.73 | 621.57 | 359.78 | 533.14 | 495.78 | 417.20 | | |

== Ground transport ==
Bus: Starting June 5, 2024, Ibn Battuta Airport is served by a dedicated bus line, with a fixed fare of 40 dirhams. The duration of the trip is 40 minutes.

The new line starts from Ibn Battuta Airport, passing through Route de Rabat, Royal Army Avenue, Moulay Ismail Avenue, Beethoven Avenue, Mohammed 5 Avenue, Avenue d’Espagne, and finally arriving at the train station.

Taxi: Tangier-Ibn Battouta is served by a dedicated taxi stand. Grand Taxis are available 24 hours a day at the curb in front of the terminal. The price of these taxis is fixed by the Moroccan Government. There are no bus routes that serve the airport directly. Small local taxis may drop off passengers but are forbidden from picking up at the terminal.

== Incidents and accidents ==
- On 23 December 1973, a Sud Aviation Caravelle on lease to Royal Air Maroc crashed near the airport after the pilot turned too far to the East in his approach to runway 28. In dark and rainy conditions, the plane overflew the dangerous terrain and crashed into the mountains. All 106 on board died.
- On 23 November 1988, Vickers Viscount G-BBVH of Gibraltar Airways was damaged beyond economic repair in a landing accident.
