= Agadir–Al Massira Airport =

Airport serving Agadir, Souss-Massa, Morocco

Agadir–Al Massira Airport مطار المسيرة
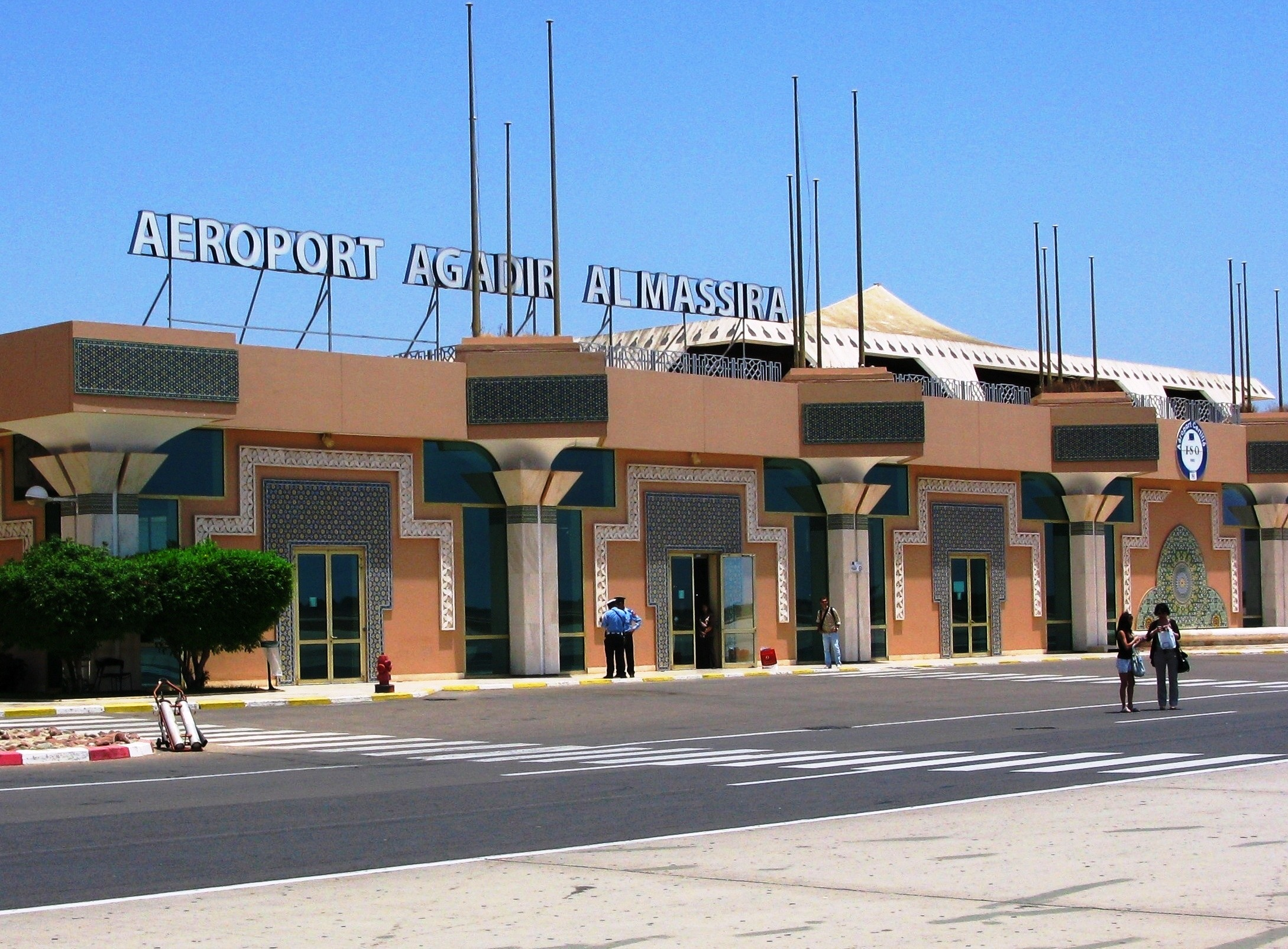
- IATA: AGA; ICAO: GMAD

Summary
- Airport type: Public
- Operator: Airports of Morocco
- Serves: Agadir, Souss-Massa, Morocco
- Location: Temsia, Souss-Massa, Morocco
- Elevation AMSL: 226 ft (69 m)
- Coordinates: 30°19′30″N 009°24′47″W
- Website: https://www.onda.ma/en/Our-Airports/Agadir-Massira-Airport

Map
- Location of airport in Morocco

Runways
Direction	Length		Surface
Direction	m	ft	Surface
09/27	3,200	10,499	Asphalt

Statistics (2019)
- Passengers: 2,304,045
- Passenger change 22-23: ▲ +29.8%
- Source: ONDA/airport website, DAFIF,

Agadir–Al Massira Airport (Arabic: مطار المسيرة, romanized: Matar al-Maseera; French: Aéroport Al Massira; IATA: AGA, ICAO: GMAD) is an international airport serving Agadir, a major city in southwest Morocco and the capital of Souss-Massa region.

The airport is located in the commune of Temsia, 20 kilometres (12 mi) southeast of Agadir proper. In 2023, Al Massira International Airport carried 2,304,045 passengers. Several years later, tourism and Agadir thrived, with new flights to Al Massira from new United Kingdom and Ireland airports.

== Facilities ==
=== Runway and apron ===
The runway in direction 09/27 measures 3,200 by 45 metres (10,499 ft × 148 ft). Aircraft up to the size of a Boeing 747 can land on the airport. The airport has an ILS Class II certification and offers the following radionavigational aids: VOR – DME – 2 X NDB.

Parking space for the aircraft is 170,000 square metres (1,829,900 sq ft) which results in space for ten Boeing 737s and three Boeing 747s.

=== Terminal ===
Total terminal area is 26,550 square metres (285,800 sq ft) and projected capacity is 3 million passengers per year. There is one large waiting room, divided in two to provide for national flights (no customs) and international flights. Passengers flying to Casablanca with a connecting international flight can pass through passport control in Agadir to save transfer time at Mohammed V. Agadir is one of the six airports in Morocco where ONDA offers its special VIP service Salon Convives de Marque.

== Airlines and destinations ==
The following airlines operate regular scheduled and charter flights at Agadir–Al Massira Airport:

Airlines	Destinations
Air Arabia	Fès, Rabat, Tangier
Air Transat	Seasonal: Montréal–Trudeau
Binter Canarias	Gran Canaria
British Airways	London–Gatwick
Bulgaria Air	Seasonal charter: Sofia
Condor	Seasonal: Düsseldorf, Frankfurt, Hamburg, Munich
Discover Airlines	Seasonal: Frankfurt
easyJet	Basel/Mulhouse, Berlin, Birmingham (begins 27 October 2027), Bordeaux, Bristol, Edinburgh, Geneva, London–Gatwick, London–Luton, Manchester, Nice; Seasonal: Glasgow, Lyon, Paris–Charles de Gaulle
Edelweiss Air	Seasonal: Zurich
Enter Air	Gdańsk, Katowice, Poznań
Eurowings	Seasonal: Düsseldorf, Prague, Stuttgart
Finnair	Seasonal: Helsinki
Jet2.com	Birmingham, Bristol, Glasgow, Leeds/Bradford, London–Stansted, Manchester; Seasonal: Bournemouth, East Midlands, London–Gatwick, Newcastle upon Tyne
LOT Polish Airlines	Warsaw-Chopin
Luxair	Seasonal: Luxembourg
Marabu	Seasonal: Hamburg
Norwegian Air Shuttle	Seasonal: Copenhagen, Helsinki, Oslo, Stockholm-Arlanda
Royal Air Maroc	Casablanca, Dakhla, Jeddah, Laayoune, Medina, Paris–Orly
Royal Air Maroc Express	Casablanca
Ryanair	Beauvais, Bergamo, Birmingham, Charleroi, Dublin, Edinburgh, Frankfurt-Hahn, Fès, Kraków, London–Stansted, Madrid, Milan-Malpensa, Manchester, Marseille, Nantes, Oujda, Tangier, Tenerife–South, Toulouse, Vienna, Weeze, Wrocław; Seasonal: Cologne/Bonn, Lisbon, Porto
Scandinavian Airlines	Seasonal: Copenhagen, Stockholm–Arlanda
Smartwings	Seasonal charter: Prague
TAP Air Portugal	Seasonal: Lisbon
Transavia	Amsterdam, Berlin, Bordeaux, Brest, Brussels, Lille, Lyon, Montpellier, Nantes, Paris–Orly, Rennes, Toulouse
TUI Airways	Birmingham, London–Gatwick, Manchester; Seasonal: Newcastle upon Tyne
TUI fly Belgium	Seasonal charter: Brussels, Lille, Paris–Orly
TUI fly Deutschland	Seasonal charter: Düsseldorf, Frankfurt
Volotea	Seasonal: Bordeaux, Lille, Nantes, Strasbourg
Vueling	Seasonal: Barcelona, Paris–Orly
Wizz Air	Milan-Malpensa, Seasonal: Bratislava, Katowice, Warsaw–Chopin

^a This flight operates via Marrakech. However, this carrier does not have rights to transport passengers solely between Agadir and Marrakech.

== Traffic statistics ==
ONDA reported the following statistics regarding Al Massira Airport.

	2016	2017	2018	2019	2020	2021	2022	2023	2024
Passengers	1,334,173	1,544,244	1,922,344	2 008 465	587 633	605 048	1 774 860	2 304 045	3 100 000

Subject	2010	2009	2008	2007	2006	2005	2004	2003	2002
Commercial movements	–	–	12,618	14,161	15,221	14,418	13,441	12,670	12,805
Passengers	1,627,485	1,456,217	1,455,194	1,502,094	1,433,353	1,315,752	1,160,127	975,181	934,433
Freight (tons)	–	–	1,165.8	1,145.4	589.6	714.1	1,723.4	1,328.1	1,708.7

== Accidents and incidents ==
- On 21 August 1994, Royal Air Maroc Flight 630, crashed roughly ten minutes after a takeoff from Agadir Airport. All 44 people on board the crew and passengers were killed. The accident is believed to have been the deliberate act of the pilot in command of the aircraft.
