= Fès–Saïss Airport =

International airport serving Fez, Morocco

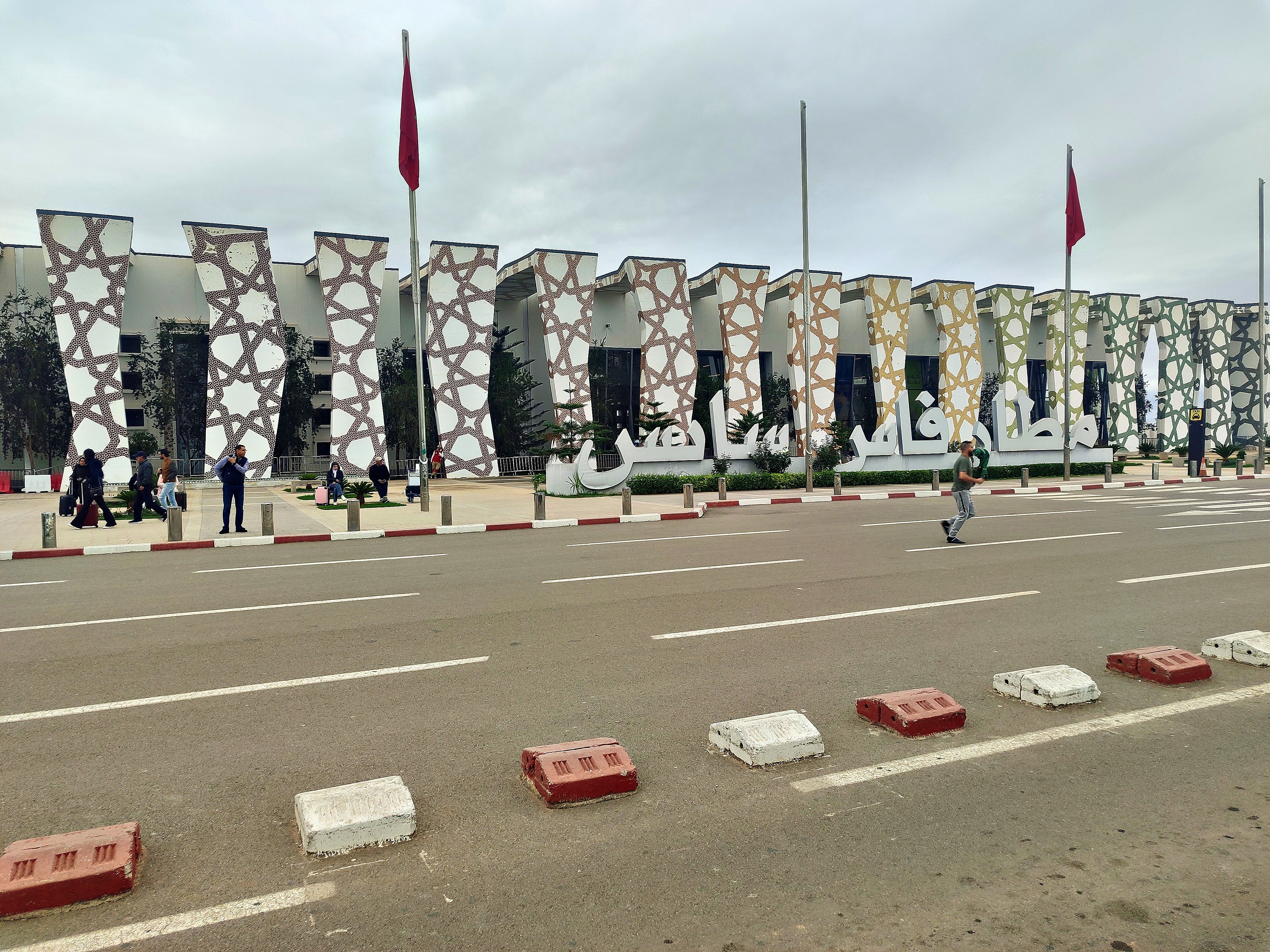
- IATA: FEZ; ICAO: GMFF

Summary
- Airport type: Public
- Operator: Airports of Morocco
- Serves: Fez, Morocco
- Elevation AMSL: 1,900 ft (580 m)
- Coordinates: 33°55′38″N 004°58′41″W
- Website: fezairport.com

Map
- Location of airport in Morocco

Runways
Direction	Length		Surface
Direction	m	ft	Surface
09/27	3,200	10,499	Asphalt

Statistics (2019)
- Passengers: 1,417,881
- Passenger change 18-19: ▲ +8.22%
- Source: DAFIF

Fès–Saïss Airport or Saïss Airport (Arabic: مطار فاس سايس الدولي) (IATA: FEZ, ICAO: GMFF) is an airport serving Fez, the capital city of the Fès-Meknès region in Morocco. The airport crossed the million passengers mark in 2017.

== Facilities ==
The airport is at an elevation of 579 metres (1,900 ft) above mean sea level. It has one runway designated 09/27 with an asphalt surface measuring 3,200 by 45 metres (10,499 ft × 148 ft).

== Airlines and destinations ==
The following airlines operate regular scheduled and charter flights at Fès–Saïs Airport:

Airlines	Destinations
Air Arabia Maroc	Agadir, Amsterdam, Barcelona, Bergamo, Bordeaux, Brussels, Lyon, Marseille, Montpellier, Paris–Charles de Gaulle, Strasbourg, Toulouse; Seasonal: Nice
Binter Canarias	Seasonal: Gran Canaria
Discover Airlines	Seasonal: Munich (begins 25 October 2026)
Royal Air Maroc	Paris–Orly^{a}
Royal Air Maroc Express	Casablanca
Ryanair	Agadir, Barcelona, Beauvais, Bergamo, Bologna, Charleroi, Dole, Eindhoven, Hahn, Karlsruhe/Baden-Baden, Lille, London–Stansted, Madrid, Málaga, Marrakesh, Marseille, Nantes, Nimes, Rome–Ciampino, Toulouse, Weeze; Seasonal: Alicante, Valencia
Transavia	Lyon, Paris–Orly, Rotterdam/The Hague
TUI fly Belgium	Brussels

^a On selected days, this flight operates from Tangier to Paris via Fez. However, this carrier does not sell tickets solely between Fez and Tangier.

== Statistics ==
2003	2004	2005	2006	2007	2008	2009	2010	2011	2012	2013	2014	2015	2016	2017
128 778 ▲13,92 %	189 027 ▲46,79 %	222 522 ▲17,72 %	228 399 ▲2,64 %	333 929 ▲46,20 %	409 260 ▲30,06 %	530 432 ▲28,81 %	743 018 ▲40,08 %	792 611 ▲7,43 %	654 691 ▼-17,40 %	790 785 ▲20,79 %	791 564 ▲0,1 %	886 525 ▲12,00 %	892 974 ▲0,73 %	1 115 595 ▲24,93 %

== Ground transport ==
The airport Fez Saiss is located about 13 km from the city center of Fez. The bus (number 16) offers regular trips between the airport and the bus and train stations of Fez. The trip takes 40 mins from the airport to the central train station. Taxis are available for hire at the exit of the passenger terminal. The rate to the city centre is fixed at 150 dirhams.
