= Moulay Ali Cherif Airport =

Moulay Ali Cherif Airport مطار مولاي علي الشريف (Arabic) Aéroport de Moulay Ali Chérif (French)
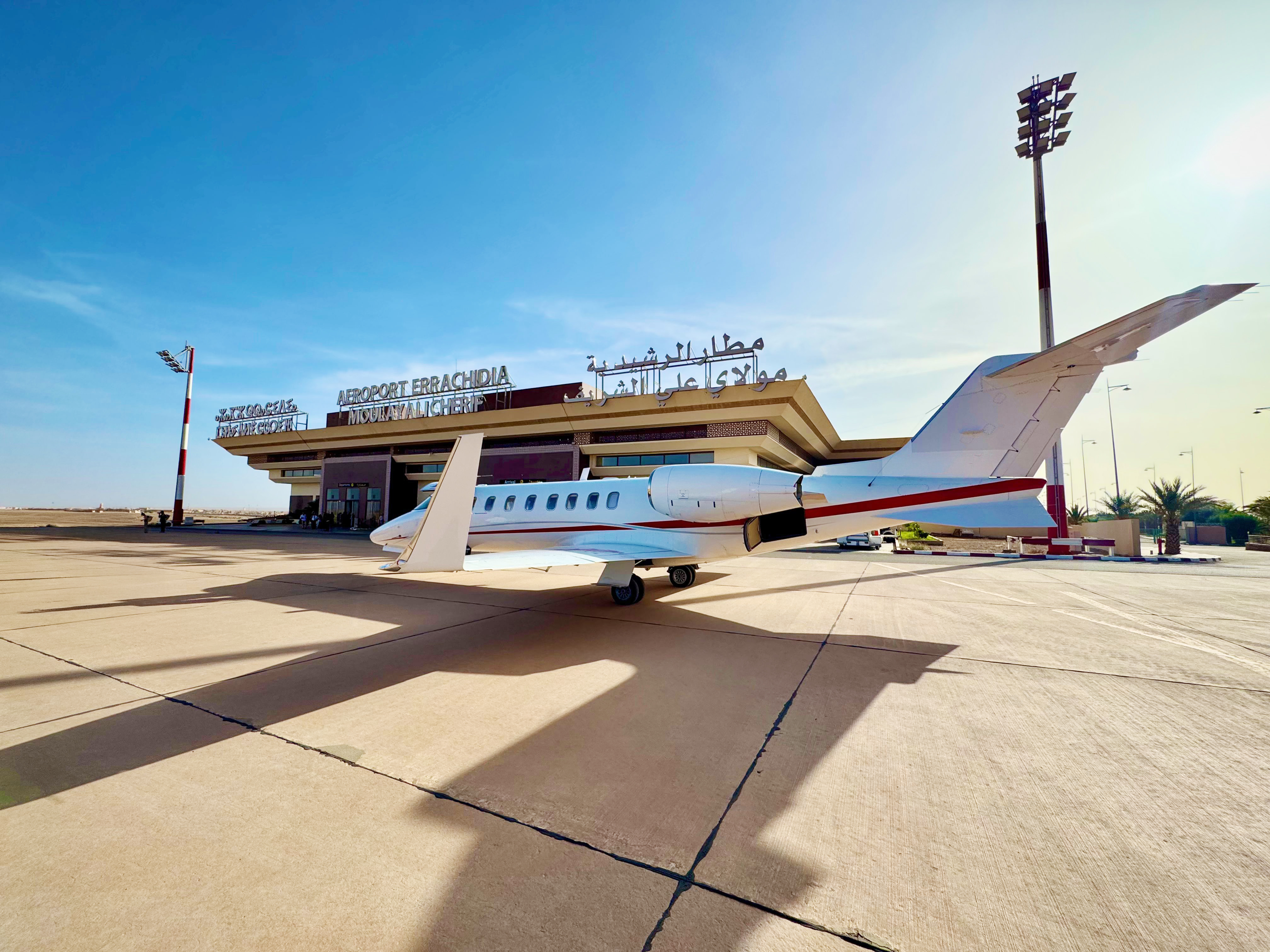
- Bombardier Learjet 45 parked at Moulay Ali Cherif Airport
- IATA: ERH; ICAO: GMFK

Summary
- Airport type: Public / Military
- Operator: Royal Moroccan Air Force
- Location: Errachidia, Morocco
- Elevation AMSL: 3,428 ft (1,045 m)
- Coordinates: 31°56′51″N 004°23′54″W

Map
- Location of airport in Morocco

Runways
Direction	Length		Surface
Direction	m	ft	Surface
13/31	3,200	10,499	Asphalt
- Source: DAFIF

Moulay Ali Cherif Airport (Arabic: مطار مولاي علي الشريف) (IATA: ERH, ICAO: GMFK) is an airport serving Errachidia (Er-Rachidia), capital of the Drâa-Tafilalet region in Morocco.

== Facilities ==
The airport resides at an elevation of 3,428 feet (1,045 m) above mean sea level. It has one runway designated 13/31 with an asphalt surface measuring 3,200 by 45 metres (10,499 ft × 148 ft).

== Airlines and destinations ==
The following airlines operate regular scheduled and charter flights at Er-Rachidia Airport:

Airlines	Destinations
Royal Air Maroc	Casablanca, Rabat
Ryanair	Marrakesh
Transavia	Seasonal: Paris–Orly
