= Airports of Morocco =

Moroccan airport operator and administrator

- مطارات المغرب

Agency overview
- Formed: May 6, 1982; 44 years ago
- Headquarters: Mohammed V International Airport, Nouaceur, Casablanca-Settat (Morocco)
- Minister responsible: Abdessamad Kayouh, Minister of Transport and Logistics
- Agency executive: Adel El Fakir, Director General
- Website: onda.ma

Airports of Morocco (Arabic: مطارات المغرب), formerly the Office national des aéroports (ONDA), is a Moroccan public institution responsible for the management, operation, and development of the country’s civil airports, as well as for air navigation control within the Kingdom of Morocco.

The institution is responsible for the administration and modernization of airport infrastructure, airport safety and security, and the provision of air navigation services, in accordance with national and international standards.

Airports of Morocco has been headed by Adel El Fakir, Director General, since 2024.

== History ==
Until 1980, Morocco’s airports and air navigation services were managed directly by the state administration, under the authority of the ministry responsible for transport.

Following the construction and commissioning of a new terminal at Mohammed V International Airport in Casablanca, the government opted for a system of autonomous management. This led in 1980 to the creation of the first public body dedicated to airport management, the Office des aéroports de Casablanca (OAC), whose responsibilities were initially limited to the airports of Casablanca.

=== Office des aéroports de Casablanca ===
The establishment of the OAC marked the first stage in the new airport management framework. It was created in line with the Throne Speech delivered on 3 March 1981 by King Hassan II, in which he stated: “We have resolved to develop, expand and modernize the communications network, to increase the number of airports and to raise them to the level of the most prestigious Western airports.”

The positive results of this first experience played a decisive role in the decision to extend the model to all national airports.

=== Office national des aéroports ===
The responsibilities of the OAC were gradually expanded, eventually covering all Moroccan airports and air navigation services from 1990 onward.

This gradual strengthening of the institution’s responsibilities was part of a policy aimed at supporting the development of the national aeronautical sector.

The Office national des aéroports was formally established by Decree No. 2-89-480 of 1 Jumada II 1410 (30 December 1989), implementing Law No. 14-89, which transformed the Office des aéroports de Casablanca into the Office national des aéroports.

In 1991, a royal decision attached all air navigation services to the institution, consolidating its role and expanding its scope of action in the national aeronautical sector.

In May 2021, the institution announced plans to build and operate a facility dedicated to the storage, dismantling, and recycling of end-of-life aircraft near Oujda-Angad Airport.

=== Airports of Morocco ===
In 2025, the Office national des aéroports officially changed its name to Airports of Morocco.

As part of its investment programmes, Airports of Morocco launched several airport modernization projects. Moroccan construction companies Jet Contractors and SGTM were awarded contracts for the modernization of Marrakesh Menara Airport and Agadir–Al Massira Airport respectively, for a total value exceeding 4.4 billion Moroccan dirhams.

The construction groups TGCC and SGTM were also selected for the construction of the new terminal at Mohammed V International Airport, as part of a project aimed at increasing the capacity of Morocco’s busiest airport.

== Partnerships and agreements ==
Airports of Morocco helped supervise the construction of Yasser Arafat International Airport, with which Mohammed V International Airport is twinned. It also organized training programmes for Palestinian engineers in Morocco in 1997, several months before the inauguration of the airport in Gaza in December 1998.

On 12 March 2003, the institution signed a partnership agreement with Côte d'Azur International Airport in Nice, France.

== Statistics ==
As the national operator of Morocco’s public airports, Airports of Morocco publishes information on aircraft movements, passenger traffic and cargo activity. These data provide an indication of the development of air transport and airport activity in the country.

Airports of Morocco publishes monthly reports containing passenger numbers by airport, total aircraft movements, including landings and take-offs, and national cargo figures.

Despite the international crisis, which particularly affected Europe and North America, the Moroccan airport authority reported continued growth in passenger numbers, aircraft movements and processed cargo.

=== Trends ===
The summer months are by far the busiest period for passenger traffic. High numbers of passengers travel to major tourist destinations such as Marrakesh and Agadir, while airports in northern Morocco also record increased traffic. Moroccans living in Europe often visit family during the summer; although many continue to travel by ferry, a growing number travel by air.

Other indicators of this trend include:

- Ryanair operates regular flights to and from Nador, Fes, Oujda, Tangier, Marrakesh and Agadir;
- during the summer months, some scheduled flights operated by Royal Air Maroc use a Boeing 747 instead of the usual Boeing 737;
- other low-cost airlines, such as Jet4you, Germanwings and Air Arabia Maroc, operate scheduled flights to northern cities including Oujda, Nador, Fes, Al Hoceima and Tangier.

The overall increase in passenger traffic in 2010, compared with 2009, was 14.93%. This trend continued in 2011, although at a slower pace. Year-on-year growth in passenger traffic in July 2011 was 6.28%.

Airports of Morocco is implementing a strategic airport capacity expansion programme aimed at supporting the expected growth in inbound travel and tourism ahead of the 2030 FIFA World Cup, which Morocco is co-hosting with Spain and Portugal. The initiative aims to increase national airport capacity from 36 million passengers in 2025 to 80 million passengers by 2030.

=== Busiest airports ===
The country’s main international airport, Mohammed V International Airport in Casablanca, handles over 40% of all aircraft movements, including landings and take-offs. The second busiest airport, Marrakesh Menara Airport, handles around 15%.

Mohammed V International Airport handled 15 million passengers in 2025 and is undergoing expansion to increase its annual capacity to 35 million passengers by 2030, coinciding with Morocco’s co-hosting of the World Cup.

=== Cargo ===
The volume of cargo handled by Moroccan airports has remained relatively stable after an initial decline around 2008.

=== Origin ===
Most air traffic to and from Morocco comes from Europe. France accounts for 30–35% of total traffic, while the rest of Europe accounts for 40–45%. Domestic flights represent around 10% of traffic.

Other traffic flows include North America (2–2.5%), the Middle East and Far East (5%), and Africa, including the Maghreb (3.5%) and the rest of the continent (6%).
