= Ibiza Airport =

International airport in Ibiza, Spain

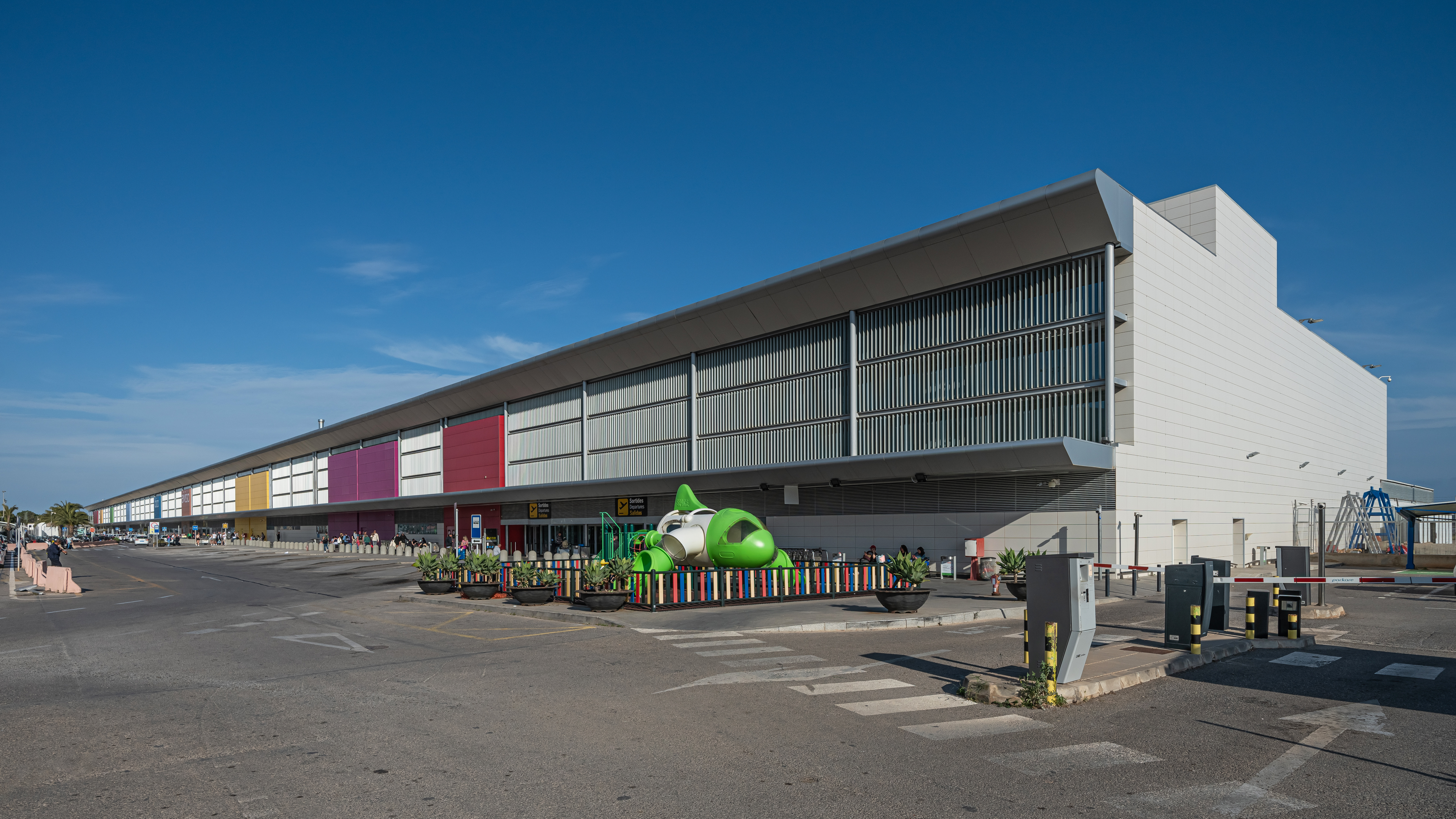
- IATA: IBZ; ICAO: LEIB

Summary
- Airport type: Public
- Owner/Operator: AENA
- Serves: Ibiza and Formentera
- Location: Ibiza, Spain
- Focus city for: Vueling
- Elevation AMSL: 24 ft (7.3 m)
- Coordinates: 38°52′22″N 01°22′33″E
- Website: aena.es

Map
- Location within Spain

Runways
Direction	Length		Surface
Direction	ft	m	Surface
06/24	9,186	2,800	Asphalt

Statistics (2023 - till Aug)
- Passengers: 6,382,961
- Passenger change 2022: ▲10.1%
- Aircraft movements: 59,721
- Movements change 2022: ▲3.0%
- Cargo (t): 697.7
- Cargo change 2022: ▼13.0%
- Source: AENA

Ibiza Airport (IATA: IBZ, ICAO: LEIB) (Catalan: Aeroport d'Eivissa, Spanish: Aeropuerto de Ibiza) is the international airport serving the Balearic Islands of Ibiza and Formentera in Spain located 7 km (4.3 mi) southwest of Ibiza. In 2020, the airport handled 2.1 million passengers (after more than 8.2 million in pre COVID-19 conditions in 2019), making it the thirteenth busiest airport in the country. As the island is a major European holiday destination, it features both year-round domestic services and several dozen seasonal routes to cities across Europe, the Middle East, and the United States. It is also used as a seasonal base for Vueling.

== History ==
=== 1940–1989 ===
The airport was first established as a temporary military airport during the Spanish Civil War, and it remained open after the conflict for use as an emergency airport. In 1949, the site was used to operate some domestic and international tourist flights, but it was closed in 1951.

It was not until 1958 that work commenced to re-open the airport in reaction to the rapid development of the tourist market in the Balearic Islands, particularly in neighbouring Mallorca. The airport reopened on 1 April 1958 with the first destinations during that year including Palma, Barcelona, Valencia and Madrid.

On 15 July 1966, Ibiza Airport reopened to international traffic and customs with 24-hour operation. This allowed the arrival of the first international flights.

=== 1990–present ===
The airport has expanded progressively over the subsequent decades with runway, taxiway, apron and terminal enhancements designed to cope with the growing air tourist market, which, by the late 1990s, was generating over 3.6 million passengers a year at the airport.

In 2011, the airport provisionally handled over 5.6 million passengers and around 61,000 aircraft movements, an increase of 11.9% and 8.4% respectively compared with 2010.

The airport plans to open direct flights to the United States in the future.

== Airlines and destinations ==
=== Passenger ===
Airlines	Destinations
Aegean Airlines	Seasonal: Athens
Aeroitalia	Seasonal: Rome–Fiumicino, Salerno
Air Europa	Madrid
Air France	Seasonal: Paris–Charles de Gaulle
Animawings	Seasonal: Bucharest–Otopeni
arkia	Seasonal: Tel Aviv
Austrian Airlines	Seasonal: Vienna
British Airways	London–City; Seasonal: London–Gatwick, London–Heathrow, London–Stansted; Seasonal charter: Jersey
Brussels Airlines	Seasonal: Brussels
Condor	Seasonal: Frankfurt, Munich, Zurich
Discover Airlines	Seasonal: Frankfurt, Munich
easyJet	Seasonal: Amsterdam, Basel/Mulhouse, Belfast–International, Bordeaux, Bristol, Geneva, London–Gatwick, London–Luton, London–Southend, Lyon, Manchester, Milan–Linate, Milan–Malpensa, Nantes, Naples, Nice, Porto
Edelweiss Air	Seasonal: Zurich
Eurowings	Seasonal: Berlin, Cologne/Bonn, Düsseldorf, Hamburg, Prague, Salzburg, Stuttgart
Iberia	Alicante, Palma de Mallorca, Valencia; Seasonal: Geneva, León, Lleida, Nice
Iberia Express	Madrid
ITA Airways	Seasonal: Milan–Linate, Rome–Fiumicino
Jet2.com	Seasonal: Belfast–International, Birmingham, Bournemouth, Bristol, East Midlands, Edinburgh, Glasgow, Leeds/Bradford, Liverpool, London–Gatwick, London–Luton, London–Stansted, Manchester, Newcastle upon Tyne
KLM	Seasonal: Amsterdam
Lufthansa	Seasonal: Frankfurt
Luxair	Seasonal: Luxembourg
Neos	Seasonal: Bergamo, Bologna, Milan–Malpensa, Rome-Fiumicino, Verona
Norwegian Air Shuttle	Seasonal: Oslo
Ryanair	Alicante, Barcelona, Madrid, Málaga, Seville, Valencia; Seasonal: Bari, Beauvais, Bergamo, Berlin, Birmingham, Bologna, Bristol, Charleroi, Dublin, Edinburgh, Eindhoven, Hahn, Leeds/Bradford, Liverpool, London–Stansted, Manchester, Marseille, Newcastle upon Tyne, Pisa, Porto, Rome–Fiumicino, Santiago de Compostela, Treviso, Toulouse, Turin, Vienna, Weeze
Scandinavian Airlines	Seasonal: Copenhagen, Stockholm–Arlanda
SkyAlps	Seasonal: Bolzano
Smartwings	Seasonal charter: Bratislava
Swiss International Air Lines	Seasonal: Geneva
TAP Air Portugal	Seasonal: Lisbon
Transavia	Amsterdam, Eindhoven; Seasonal: Brussels, Paris–Orly, Rotterdam/The Hague
TUI Airways	Seasonal: Birmingham, Bournemouth, Bristol, Cardiff, East Midlands, Exeter, Glasgow, London–Gatwick, London–Stansted, Manchester, Newcastle upon Tyne, Norwich
TUI fly Belgium	Seasonal: Brussels, Ostend/Bruges
TUI fly Deutschland	Seasonal: Düsseldorf, Hannover
TUI fly Netherlands	Seasonal: Amsterdam
Uep Fly	Palma de Mallorca
United Airlines	Seasonal: Newark (begins 1 June 2027)
Volotea	Seasonal: Asturias, Bilbao
Vueling	Barcelona, Bilbao, Paris–Orly, Seville, Valencia; Seasonal: Alicante, Lisbon, Málaga, Milan-Malpensa, Porto, Rome-Fiumicino, Santander, Santiago de Compostela
Wizz Air	Seasonal: Rome–Fiumicino

=== Cargo ===
Airlines	Destinations
Swiftair	Madrid, Palma de Mallorca, Valencia

== Statistics ==
Ibiza Airport passenger totals 1998-2024 (millions)
Updated: December 2023 (AENA Data)

	Passengers	Aircraft movements	Cargo (tonnes)
1998	3,780,181		
1999	4,185,633	45,959	
2000	4,475,708	52,544	4,985
2001	4,472,279	52,079	4,531
2002	4,094,446	48,344	4,426
2003	4,157,291	47,990	4,232
2004	4,171,580	48,798	4,510
2005	4,164,703	49,603	4,350
2006	4,460,141	54,146	4,427
2007	4,765,625	57,855	4,308
2008	4,647,487	57,235	3,928
2009	4,572,819	53,552	3,143
2010	5,040,800	56,988	3,196
2011	5,643,180	61,768	2,755
2012	5,555,048	57,738	2,316
2013	5,726,579	56,304	2,190
2014	6,212,198	60,142	2,021
2015	6,477,283	64,612	2,023
2016	7,416,368	72,503	1,831
2017	7,903,892	75,691	1,747
2018	8,104,316	76,995	1,616
2019	8,155,635	75,378	1,435
2020	2,110,348	33,185	1,053
2021	2,341,271	61,612	1,027
2022	8,156,708	80,723	1,147
2023	8,931,598	82,803	?
2024	9,069,410	83,049	?
Source: Aena Statistics

=== Busiest routes ===
Busiest international routes from IBZ (2025)
Rank	Destination	Passengers	Change 2024/25
1	Amsterdam	319.567	▲1,5%
2	Manchester	298.309	▼ -0,9%
3	London-Gatwick	294.869	▼ -2,3%
4	Paris-Orly	260.580	▲5,6%
5	London-Stansted	223.290	▼ -0,2%
6	Milan-Malpensa	219.256	▼ -1,2%
7	Rome-Fiumicino	199.250	▲17,9%
8	Bergamo	174.879	▲9,2%
9	Eindhoven	161.132	▲3,8%
10	Düsseldorf	152.334	▼ -2,8%
11	Birmingham	140.438	▲2,2%
12	Bristol	122.415	▼ -2,4%
13	Munich	122.325	▲12,8%
14	Naples	117.681	▲6,2%
15	Frankfurt	113.989	▲3,5%
16	London-Heathrow	107.542	▲7,1%
17	Newcastle	105.281	▼ -5,2%
18	Zurich	100.797	▲8,9%
19	Rotterdam/The Hague	98.049	▲2,9%
20	London-City	97.824	▼ -0,2%
Source: Estadísticas de tráfico aereo

Busiest Domestic routes from IBZ (2025)
Rank	Destination	Passengers	Change 2024/25
1	Barcelona	1.296.207	▲2,9%
2	Madrid	935.716	▼ -2,7%
3	Palma de Mallorca	563.802	▼ -2,8%
4	Valencia	318.162	▼ -8,9%
5	Málaga	198.569	▲9,2%
6	Alicante	196.603	▲11,4%
7	Seville	115.372	▼ -15,3%
8	Bilbao	92.505	▼ -15,6%
9	Santiago de Compostela	17.000	▼ -24,1%
10	Asturias	11.432	▲2,5%
Source: Estadísticas de tráfico aereo

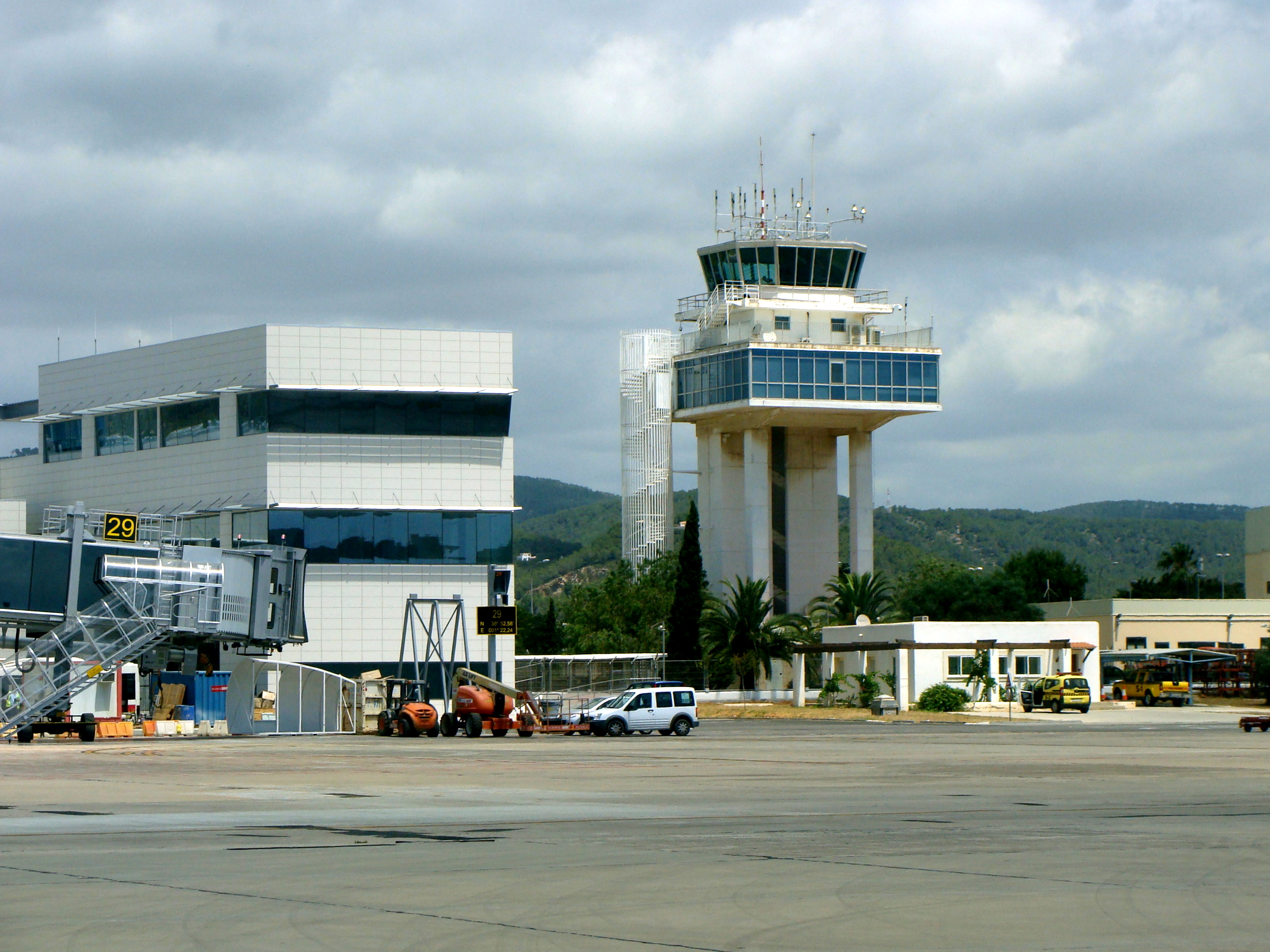
Control tower of the airport

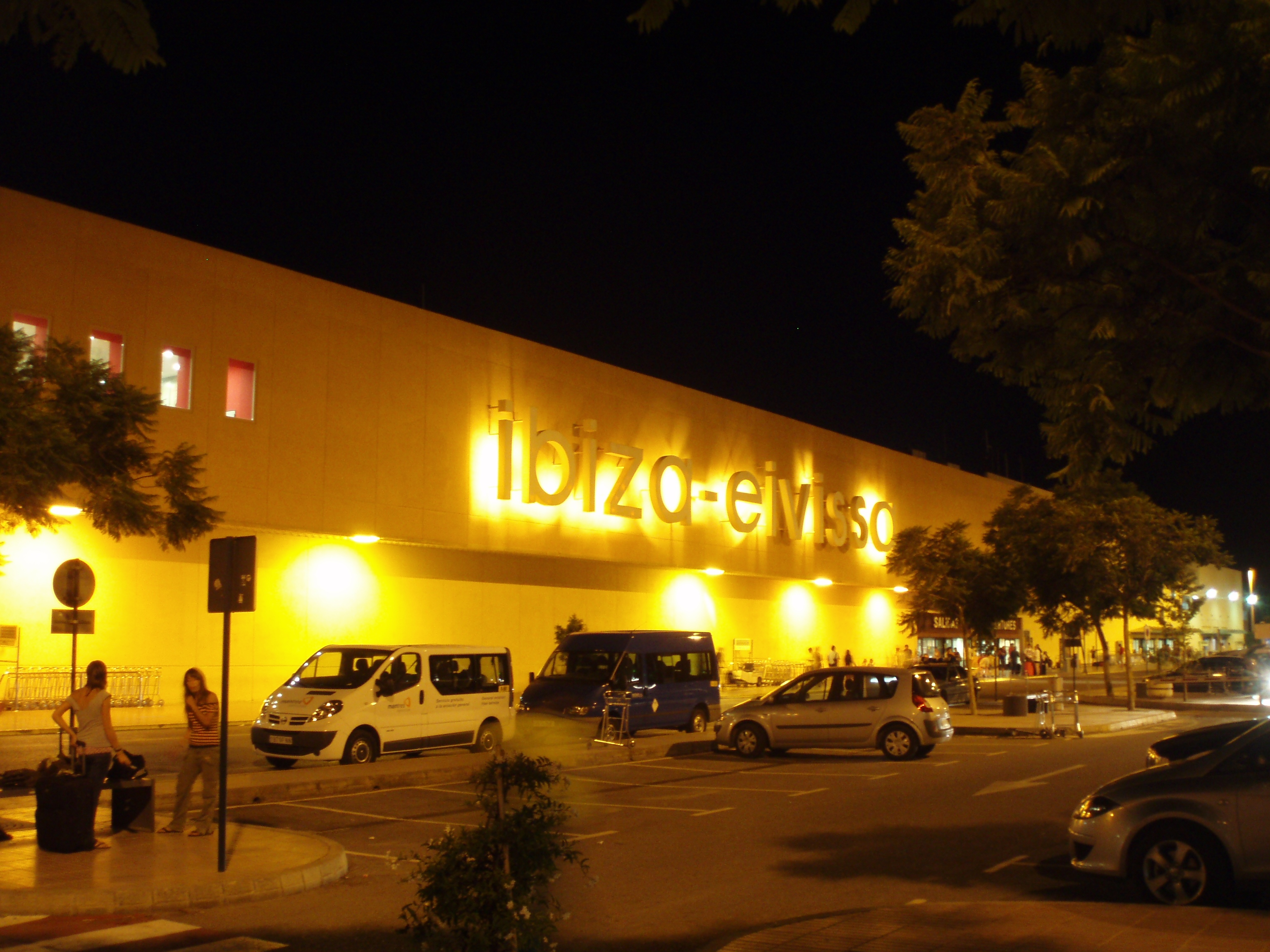
Exterior at night (2007)

== Accidents and incidents ==
- On 7 January 1972, Iberia Airlines Flight 602 struck a mountain when on approach to Ibiza Airport. All 104 passengers and crew on board were killed.
