= Alexandria Airlines =

Egyptian airline

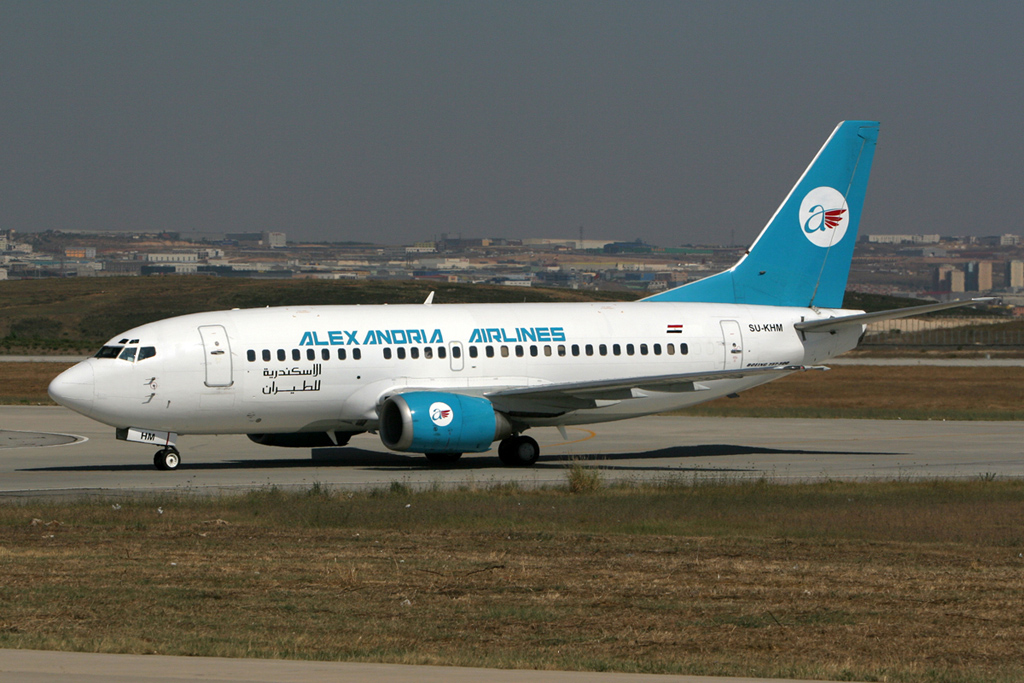
- Alexandria Airlines Boeing 737-500 in older livery
IATA	ICAO	Call sign
DQ	KHH	--
- Founded: 2007; 19 years ago
- Hubs: Cairo International Airport
- Fleet size: 2
- Destinations: 3
- Headquarters: Cairo, Egypt
- Website: alexandriaairlines.net

Alexandria Airlines is an Egyptian airline headquartered in Cairo.

== History ==
The airline was established in 2006 and commenced its operations in March 2007.

In April 2022, it was announced the airline would be resuming operations, from 23 April, from Alexandria to Amman and Kuwait.

== Destinations ==
As of March 2023, Alexandria Airlines operates to the following destinations:

Country	City	Airport	Notes	Refs
Egypt	Alexandria	Borg El Arab International Airport	Hub	
Egypt	Cairo	Cairo International Airport		
Egypt	Sharm El Sheikh	Sharm El Sheikh International Airport	Seasonal Charter	
Jordan	Amman	Queen Alia International Airport		
Kuwait	Kuwait City	Kuwait International Airport		
Morocco	Casablanca	Mohammed V International Airport	Seasonal Charter	
Morocco	Marrakesh	Marrakesh Menara Airport	Seasonal Charter	
Morocco	Tangier	Tangier Ibn Battouta Airport	Seasonal Charter	
Russia	Moscow	Moscow Domodedovo Airport	Seasonal Charter	
Saudi Arabia	Jeddah	King Abdulaziz International Airport		

== Fleet ==
=== Current fleet ===
As of July 2026, Alexandria Airlines operates the following aircraft:

Alexandria Airlines fleet
Aircraft	In service	Orders	Passengers				Notes
Aircraft	In service	Orders	F	C	Y	Total	Notes
Boeing 737-500	1	—	—	—	121	121	
Boeing 777-300	1	—	12	42	310	367	
Total	2	—					

=== Former fleet ===
As of August 2025, Alexandria Airlines operated 1 Boeing 737-300 and 1 Boeing 737-500.

The airline previously operated two Boeing 737-300 (as of April 2025).

== Partners ==
Alexandria Airlines served more than 100 tour operators, as well as airlines such as Nas Air, Buraq Air, Marsland aviation and White Airways.
