= Iberia Flight 602 =

1972 aviation accident in Spain

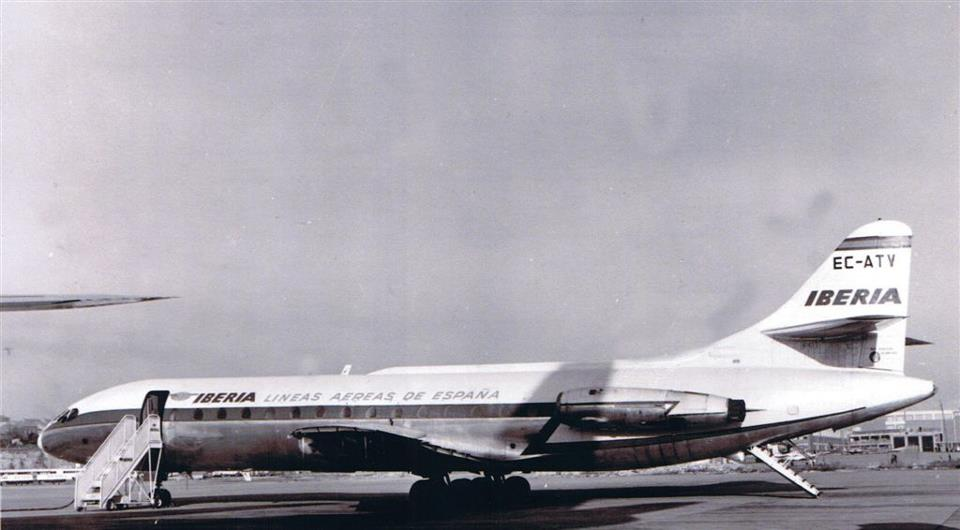
- EC-ATV, the aircraft involved in the accident, pictured in 1970.

Accident
- Date: 7 January 1972
- Summary: Controlled flight into terrain
- Site: Sierra de Atalayasa, Spain; 38°54′13″N 1°15′04″E

Aircraft
- Aircraft type: Sud Aviation SE 210 Caravelle
- Aircraft name: Maestro Victoria
- Operator: Iberia
- Registration: EC-ATV
- Flight origin: Valencia Airport
- Destination: Ibiza Airport
- Occupants: 104
- Passengers: 98
- Crew: 6
- Fatalities: 104
- Survivors: 0

Iberia Flight 602 was a domestic scheduled passenger flight operated by a Sud Aviation SE 210 Caravelle that took off from Valencia, Spain, bound for the Balearic island of Ibiza, which flew into the side of a mountain near Ibiza Airport. All 98 passengers and 6 crew died in the crash.

== Aircraft and crew ==
The aircraft was a Sud Aviation SE 210 Caravelle that first flew on 25 June 1963 and was powered by two Rolls-Royce Avon Mk.533R turbojet engines. Delivered to Iberia on 9 July, the aircraft was initially named Tomás Luis de Victoria after the Spanish Composer of the same name, though this was later shortened to Maestro Victoria.

Flight 602 was under the command of 37-year-old captain José Luis Ballester Sepúlveda, with 7,000 flying hours' experience, first officer Jesús Montesinos Sánchez, and flight engineer Vicente Rodríguez Mesa.

== The crash ==
Flight 602 was a domestic service flight that took off from Valencia Airport bound for Ibiza. On board were 6 crew and 98 passengers, most of whom were Valencia natives returning to Ibiza for work after the holidays.

At approximately 12:15 pm, the aircraft's captain radioed Ibiza Airport, requesting permission to descend to 5,500 feet (1,700 m). Ibiza Airport sources reported that he also said, "Get me a beer ready, we are here."

The aircraft was approaching Runway 07 when it descended below 2,000 feet (610 m). Reportedly, neither the captain nor the co-pilot noticed the dangerous descent, as they were discussing a football match with the airport tower controller. Flight 602 struck Mount Atalayasa approximately 90 feet (27 m) below its 1,515-foot (462 m) summit. The aircraft exploded on impact. All 98 passengers and 6 crew on board were killed.

== Cause ==
It was ruled that the pilot had failed to maintain the minimum flight altitude for a visual approach to Runway 07.
