= Iberia Flight 565 =

1978 aviation accident in Spain

- EC-BMX, the aircraft involved in the accident, pictured in 1969

Accident
- Date: March 3, 1978
- Summary: Overran the runway due to aquaplaning and pilot error
- Site: Santiago–Rosalía de Castro Airport, Santiago de Compostela, Spain

Aircraft
- Aircraft type: Douglas DC-8-63
- Aircraft name: El Españoleto
- Operator: Iberia
- Registration: EC-BMX
- Flight origin: Madrid–Barajas Airport, Madrid, Spain
- Destination: Santiago–Rosalía de Castro Airport, Santiago de Compostela, Spain
- Occupants: 221
- Passengers: 210
- Crew: 11
- Fatalities: 0
- Injuries: 70
- Survivors: 221

Iberia Flight 565 was a domestic flight in Spain from Madrid to Santiago de Compostela. On March 3, 1978, the plane overran the runway and slid down into a ravine, injuring 70 on board, but no fatalities of the 221 on board.

On board of the flight consisted of: former members of Universidade da Coruña - José Luis Meilán Gil, Nona Inés Vilariño; politician - Pío Cabanillas Gallas; lawyer - Antonio Vazquez Guillen philosopher - José Luis López Aranguren; Dean of the Faculty of Medicine - Ramon Varela Nunez; co-owner of Grupo Marsans - Gerardo Díaz Ferrán, Gonzalo Pascual; and Spanish hard rock band Ñu.

== Background ==
=== Aircraft ===
The aircraft involved was a Douglas DC-8-63, registered as EC-BMX, and nicknamed "El Españoleto". The plane was manufactured and was flying for Iberia since August 1968.

=== Crew member ===
On board was captain Jaime Ordovás Artieda, who have accumulated about 15,00 flight hours. He was famously known for an UFO incident on February 28, 1969 as Iberia Flight 435.

== Accident ==
At 17:15 the plane arrived at Santiago with heavy rain. At 17:25, the aircraft touched down at an unsuitable location and was unable to stop. As they were about to hit a radio facility, the pilot maneuvered leading the plane to plunge twenty meters into a muddy, gorse-covered area, where the engines immediately caught fire, and its front section partially destroyed.

The captain was then praised for shutting down the electrical system of the plane, not igniting or spreading the fire any further.

== Investigation ==
The cause of the accident was found to be the aquaplaning effect, which cause the plane to slide, reducing the braking effort. Contributing factor was unstable landing due to pilot error.

== See also ==
- TAM Airlines Flight 3054
- Qantas Flight 1
