= Marrakesh Menara Airport =

Airport in Marrakesh, Morocco

Marrakesh Menara Airport مطار مراكش المنارة (Arabic)
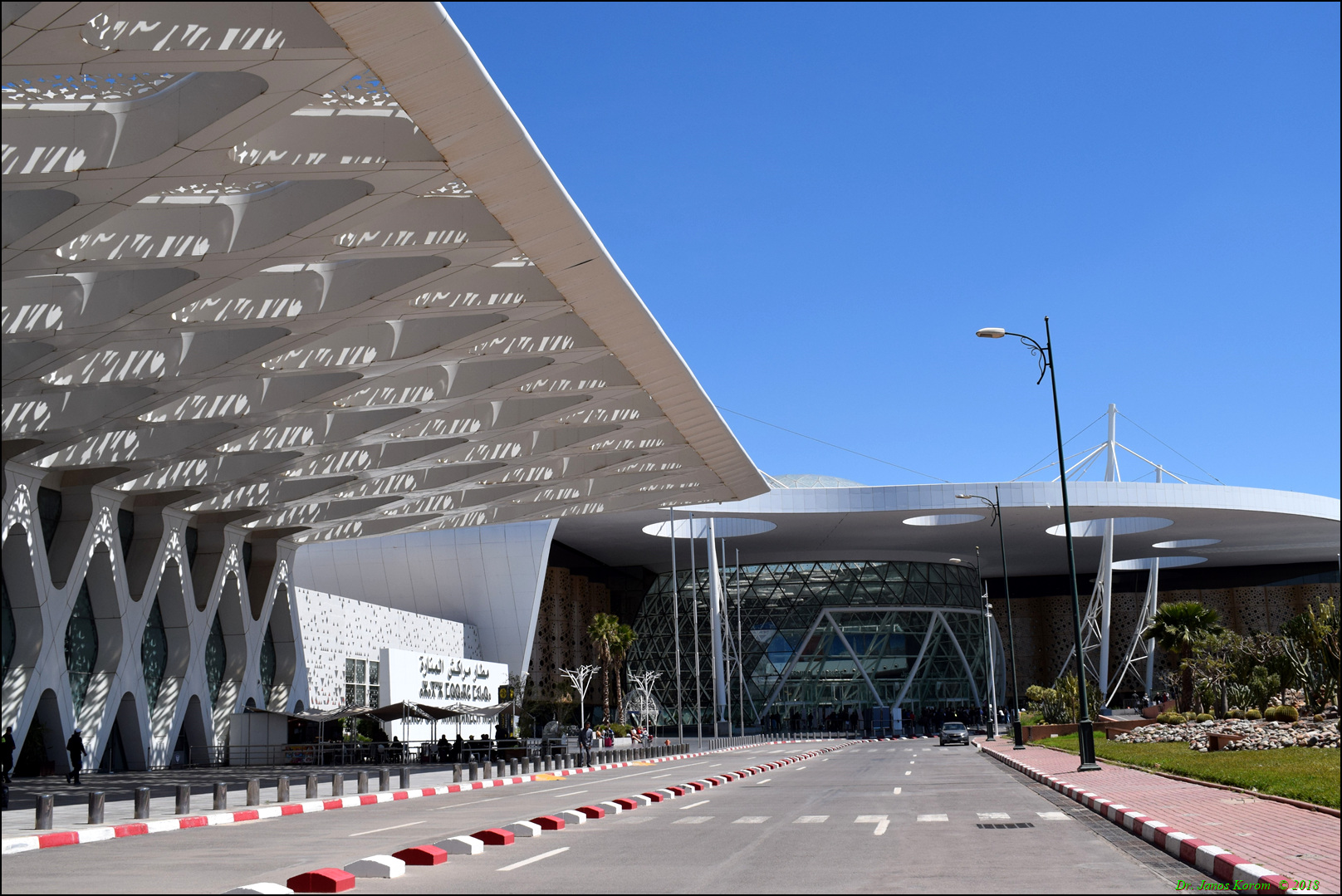
- IATA: RAK; ICAO: GMMX

Summary
- Airport type: Public / Military
- Owner: Royal Moroccan Air Force
- Operator: Airports of Morocco
- Serves: Marrakesh-Safi
- Location: Marrakesh, Morocco
- Focus city for: Royal Air Maroc; Transavia France
- Operating base for: easyJet; Ryanair; TUI fly Belgium
- Elevation AMSL: 1,545 ft (471 m)
- Coordinates: 31°36′25″N 008°02′11″W

Map
- Location of airport in Morocco

Runways
Direction	Length		Surface
Direction	m	ft	Surface
10/28	3,100	10,170	Asphalt

Statistics
- Aircraft movements (2023): 48,150
- Passengers (2024): 9,300,000
- Passenger change 23-24: ▲34%

Marrakesh Menara Airport (Arabic: مطار مراكش المنارة, French: Aéroport de Marrakech-Ménara, IATA: RAK, ICAO: GMMX) is an international airport serving Marrakesh, the capital city of the Marrakesh-Safi region in Morocco. It is an international facility that receives several European flights as well as flights from Casablanca, the Arab world nations and from 2024, flights from North America. The airport served over 6.3 million passengers in 2019.

== History ==
In August 1991, the airport reopened after US$8 million was spent to extend the runway and refurbish buildings.

Terminal 2 of the airport opened in 2005, retrofitting of solar panels completed in June 2008, and Terminal 3 opened in 2016.

== Facilities ==
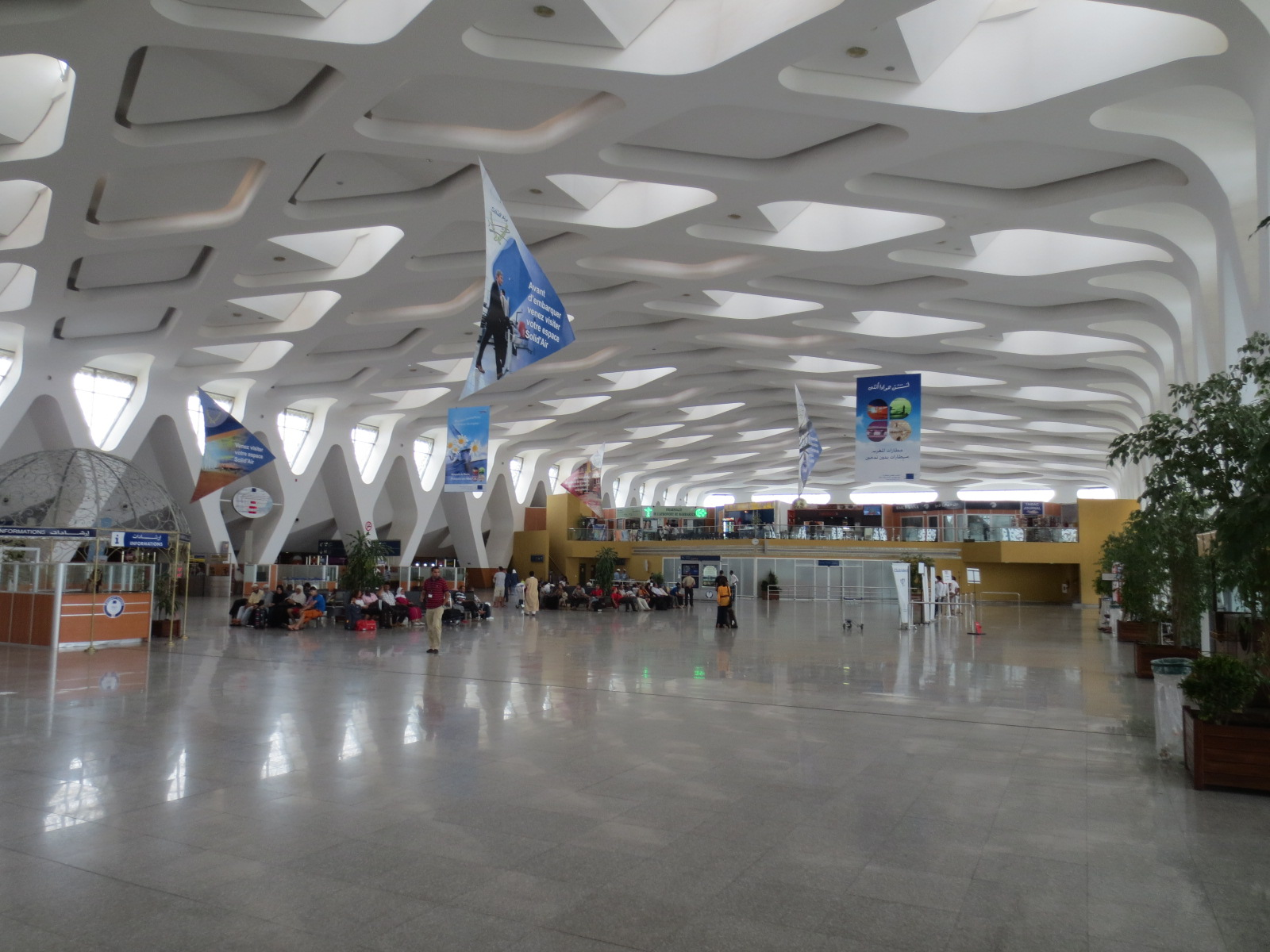
Check-in hall

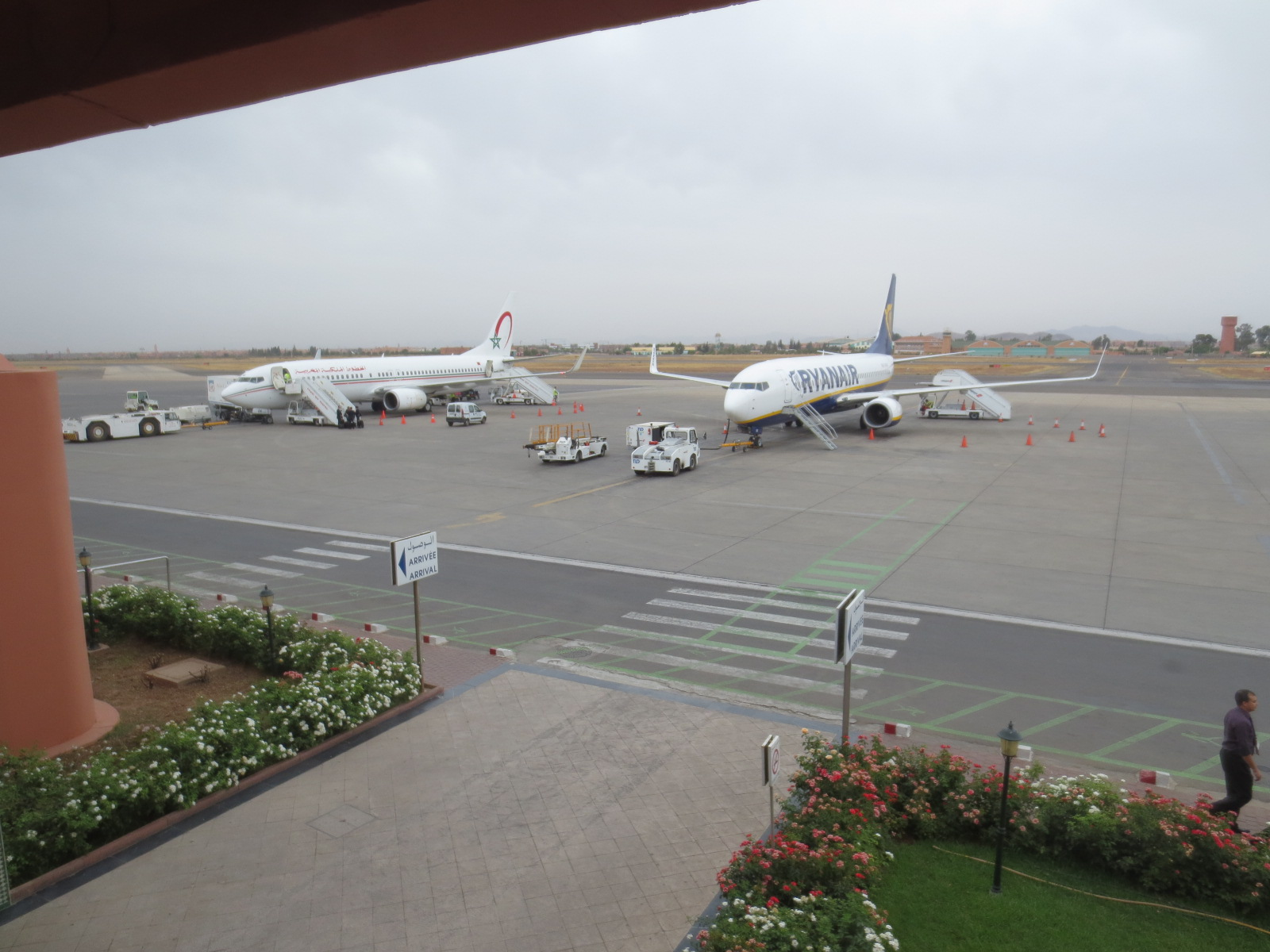
Apron view

=== Terminal ===
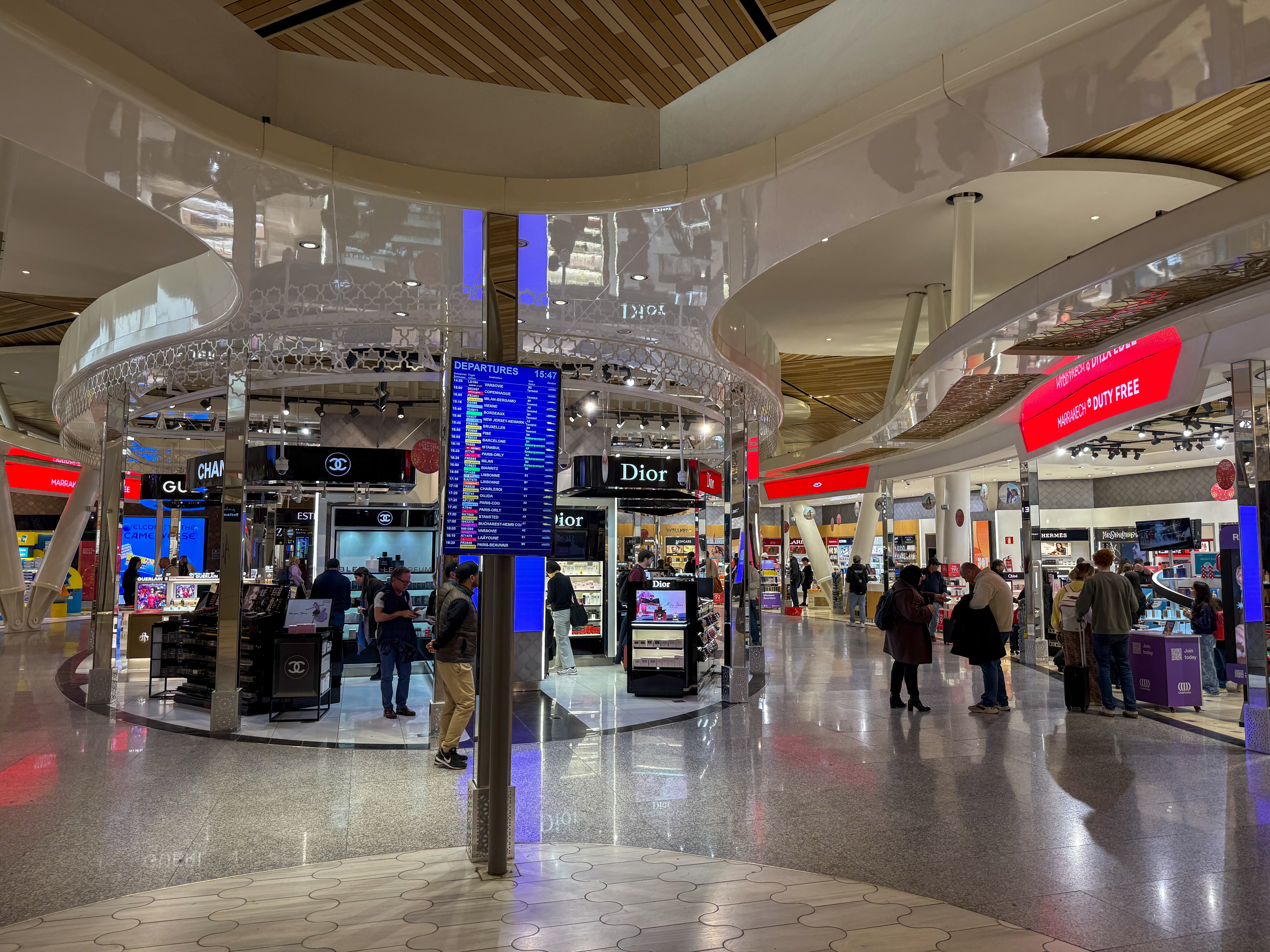
Marrakech Airport terminal 1 interior

Menara Airport has two passenger terminals housed in one large building. A third terminal has been built. The existing T1/T2 offer a space of 42,000 m^{2} and have a designed capacity of nine million passengers/year. The separate freight-terminal has 340 m^{2} covered space The air terminals (1 and 2) are 22,000 m^{2} (240,000 sq ft) and designed to handle 2,500,000 passengers per year. Menara is one of the six airports in Morocco where ONDA offers its special VIP service Salon Convives de Marque.

=== Runway and apron ===
Aircraft parking space of 125,000 square metres (1,350,000 sq ft) supports up to fourteen Boeing 737s and four Boeing 747s. The cargo terminal is 340 m^{2} (3,700 sq ft) of covered space. The paved runway is laid out in the direction 10/28 is 3,100 by 45 metres (10,000 ft × 150 ft). It can receive all modern jetliners up to the Boeing 747 in size. The airport is equipped with an ILS Cat II landing system and offers the following radio navigation aids: VOR – DME – NDB.

== Airlines and destinations ==
The following airlines operate regular scheduled and charter flights at Marrakesh Menara Airport:

Airlines	Destinations
Aer Lingus	Seasonal: Dublin
airBaltic	Seasonal: Riga
Air Europa	Madrid
Air France	Paris–Charles de Gaulle; Seasonal: Nice
Air Transat	Montréal–Trudeau
Alexandria Airlines	Seasonal charter: Sharm El Sheikh
Animawings	Seasonal: Bucharest–Otopeni
arkia	Tel Aviv (resumes 4 January 2027)
Austrian Airlines	Seasonal: Vienna
Binter Canarias	Seasonal: Funchal, Tenerife–North
British Airways	London–Gatwick, London–Heathrow
Chair Airlines	Zurich
Delta Air Lines	Seasonal: Atlanta
Discover Airlines	Frankfurt, Munich
easyJet	Basel/Mulhouse, Birmingham, Bordeaux, Bristol, Geneva, Hamburg, Lisbon, Lille, Liverpool, London–Gatwick, London–Luton, London–Southend, Lyon, Málaga, Manchester, Milan–Malpensa, Nantes, Naples, Nice, Paris–Charles de Gaulle, Porto, Prague, Strasbourg, Toulouse; Seasonal: Amsterdam, Belfast–International, Edinburgh, Glasgow
Edelweiss Air	Seasonal: Zurich (Note: On selected days, this flight operates from Marrakesh to Zurich via Agadir. However, this carrier does not have rights to transport passengers solely between Marrakesh and Agadir.)
El Al	Tel Aviv (resumes 21 December 2026)
European Air Charter	Seasonal charter: Sofia
Eurowings	Seasonal: Düsseldorf, Prague
Iberia	Madrid
Jet2.com	Birmingham, Glasgow, London–Stansted, Manchester, Newcastle upon Tyne; Seasonal: Leeds/Bradford
LOT Polish Airlines	Seasonal: Warsaw–Chopin
Luxair	Seasonal: Luxembourg
Norwegian Air Shuttle	Copenhagen; Seasonal: Helsinki, Stockholm–Arlanda
Qatar Airways	Doha
Royal Air Maroc	Bordeaux, Brussels, Casablanca, Dakhla, Laayoune, Lyon, Marseille, Nantes, Paris–Charles de Gaulle, Paris–Orly, Toulouse
Royal Air Maroc Express	Casablanca
Ryanair	Alicante, Barcelona, Beauvais, Bergamo, Berlin, Birmingham, Brussels, Budapest, Châlons-Vatry, Charleroi, Cologne/Bonn, Dole, Dublin, Edinburgh, Eindhoven, Errachidia, Faro, Fès, Girona, Gran Canaria, Hahn, Lisbon, Liverpool London–Stansted, Madrid, Manchester, Marseille, Milan–Malpensa, Naples, Newcastle upon Tyne, Nimes, Oujda, Perpignan, Pisa, Porto, Rome–Ciampino, Santander, Seville, Stockholm–Arlanda, Tangier, Tetouan, Toulouse, Tours, Treviso, Turin, Valencia, Weeze, Zaragoza; Seasonal: Kraków, Lanzarote, La Rochelle, Limoges, Palma de Mallorca, Tenerife–South
Saudia	Seasonal: Jeddah
Scandinavian Airlines	Seasonal: Copenhagen
Sundor	Tel Aviv (begins 15 December 2026)
Swiss International Air Lines	Geneva
TAP Air Portugal	Lisbon
Transavia	Amsterdam, Bordeaux, Brest, Brussels, Eindhoven, Lyon, Montpellier, Nantes, Paris–Orly, Rennes; Seasonal: Berlin, Dakar–Diass, Marseille, Praia, São Vicente
TUI Airways	Seasonal: Bristol
TUI fly Belgium	Brussels, Rotterdam
Turkish Airlines	Istanbul
United Airlines	Seasonal: Newark
Volotea	Nantes, Strasbourg; Seasonal: Bilbao, Bordeaux, Lille, Lyon
Vueling	Barcelona; Seasonal: Bilbao, Paris–Orly, Santiago de Compostela
Wizz Air	Budapest, London–Gatwick, Milan–Malpensa, Palermo, Sofia; Seasonal: Bucharest–Otopeni, Cluj-Napoca, Rome–Fiumicino

== Statistics ==
Item	2018	2017	2016	2014	2007	2006	2005	2004	2003	2002
Aircraft movements					29,246	24,613	20,689	16,112	13,843	13,078
Passengers	5,300,000	4,359,865	3,894,227	4,034,410	3,050,916	2,648,742	2,195,899	1,667,267	1,368,281	1,349,363
Freight (tons)					1555.07	1307.99	2000.40	2286.86	2092.99	2197.70
