= Iberia Flight 1456 =

2001 aviation accident in Spain

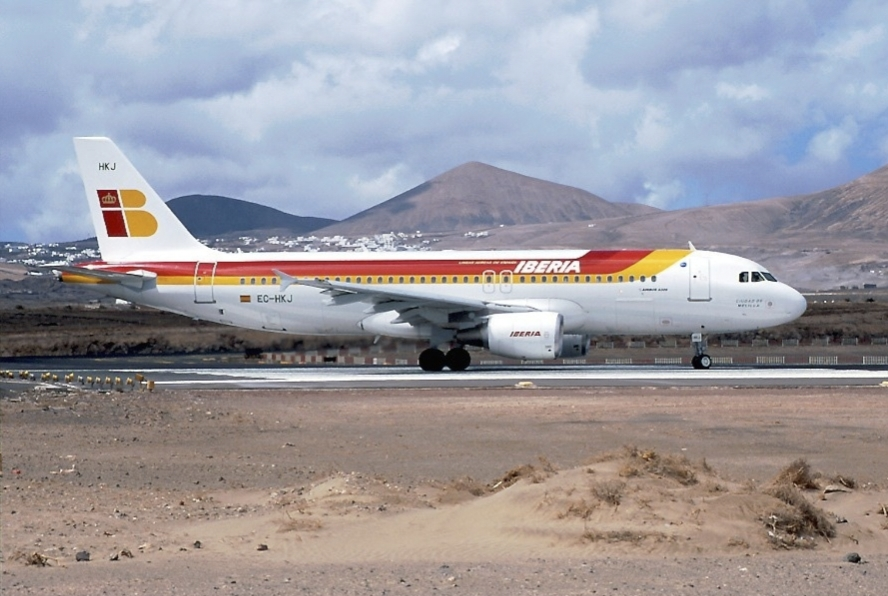
- EC-HKJ, the aircraft involved in the accident, seen in 2000

Accident
- Date: 7 February 2001
- Summary: Windshear induced landing gear collapse
- Site: Bilbao Airport, Spain

Aircraft
- Aircraft type: Airbus A320-200
- Aircraft name: Ciudad de Melilla
- Operator: Iberia
- IATA flight No.: IB1456
- ICAO flight No.: IBE1456
- Call sign: IBERIA 1456
- Registration: EC-HKJ
- Flight origin: Barcelona-El Prat Airport, Spain
- Destination: Bilbao Airport, Spain
- Occupants: 143
- Passengers: 136
- Crew: 7
- Fatalities: 0
- Injuries: 25
- Survivors: 143

Iberia Flight 1456 was a domestic scheduled flight from Barcelona-El Prat Airport to Bilbao Airport, Spain. On Wednesday, February 7, 2001, the Airbus A320 encountered a microburst-induced wind shear on final approach leading to the collapse of the aircraft's landing gear. All 143 passengers onboard survived; with 24 people suffering light injuries, and 1 person receiving serious injuries. The aircraft was irreparably damaged and was decommissioned, making it the ninth loss of an Airbus A320 at that time. This accident prompted Airbus to develop a fail-safe modification for its flight control software by preventing the airplane's built-in protection against stall from being activated by a high rate of change for the angle of attack.

== Background ==
=== Aircraft ===
The aircraft involved was an Airbus A320-200, registered as EC-HKJ, and manufactured for Iberia in 2000. At the time of the accident, it had flown 1,149 hours in 869 cycles. It was powered by two CFM International CFM56-5B4/P engines.

=== Cockpit crew ===
The captain was a 42-year-old Spanish male who held an airline transport pilot licence. He was qualified to fly Airbus A320 aircraft under instrument flight rules (IFR). At the time of the accident, he had logged a total of 10,805 flight hours. The first officer was a 27-year-old Spanish male who held a commercial pilot licence. He was qualified to fly Airbus A320 under IFR. At the time of the accident, he had a total of 2,670 flight hours. The trainee pilot, who flew under supervision, was a 24-year-old Spanish male and held a Commercial Pilot License. At the time of the accident, he had a total of 423 flight hours.

=== Cabin crew ===
There were four flight attendants onboard.

== Accident ==
On Wednesday, February 7, 2001, the Airbus A320 took off from Barcelona-El Prat Airport, Spain. The flight was uneventful until the final approach to Bilbao Airport. The Airbus encountered a microburst-induced wind shear on final approach to the airport. The crew decided to perform a go-around, but the aircraft failed to respond, causing the plane's landing gear to collapse. A subsequent emergency evacuation was carried out. All 143 occupants on the aircraft survived, but 25 people were injured during the evacuation. One crew member and 23 passengers suffered minor injuries, while a female passenger was seriously injured. Seven injured passengers were taken to hospitals. The three pilots were not injured. The aircraft was substantially damaged and written off, making it the ninth hull loss of an Airbus A320.

=== Other damage ===
The runway received minor damage upon the aircraft's hard landing. Two runway edge lights were broken.

== Investigation ==
The Civil Aviation Accident and Incident Investigation Commission (CIAIAC) immediately launched an investigation into the accident, which took 5 years and 9 months. The investigation by the CIAIAC concluded:

The activation of the angle of attack protection system, which, under a particular combination of vertical gusts and windshear and the simultaneous actions of both crew members on the sidesticks, not considered in the design, prevented the plane from pitching up and flaring during the landing.

== Aftermath ==
This accident prompted Airbus to develop a modification for its flight control software by preventing the airplane's built-in protection against stall from being activated by a high rate of change for the angle of attack. Following this accident, the CIAIAC made four safety recommendations.
