= Seville Airport =

International airport in Spain

Seville Airport Aeropuerto de Sevilla

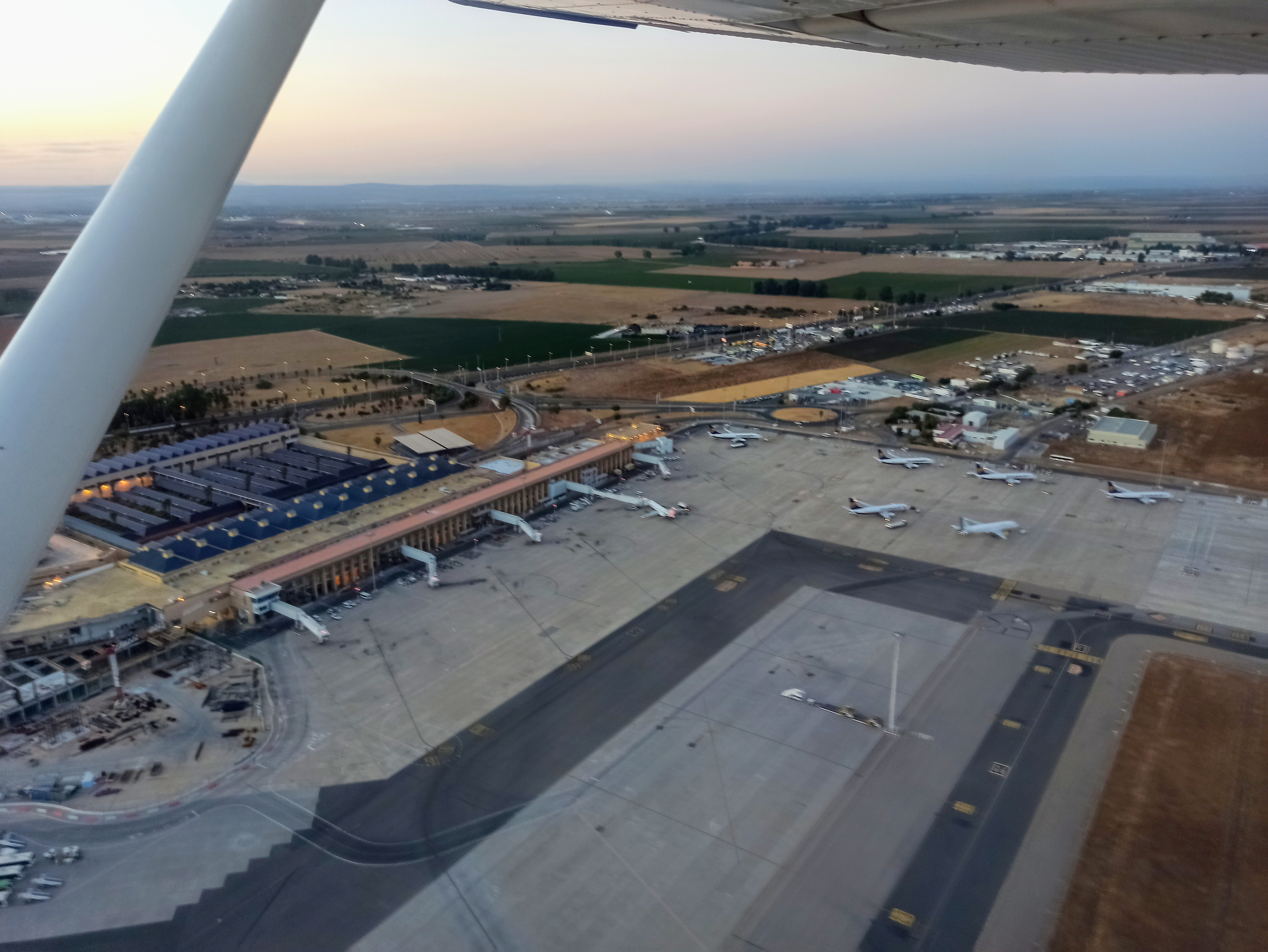
- IATA: SVQ; ICAO: LEZL

Summary
- Airport type: Public
- Owner/Operator: AENA
- Serves: Seville, Andalusia, Spain
- Focus city for: Ryanair; Vueling
- Elevation AMSL: 34 m (112 ft)
- Coordinates: 37°25′05″N 005°53′56″W
- Website: aena.es

Map
- Location within Spain

Runways
Direction	Length		Surface
Direction	m	ft	Surface
09/27	3,360	11,024	Concrete/Asphalt

Statistics (2024)
- Passengers: 9,075,172
- Passenger change 23-24: ▲13.1%
- Aircraft movements: 64,774
- Movements change 22–23: ▲7.3%
- Cargo (t): 10,914
- Cargo change 22-23: ▲10.3%
- Source: AENA

Seville Airport (IATA: SVQ, ICAO: LEZL) (Spanish: Aeropuerto de Sevilla) is the sixth busiest inland airport in Spain. It is the main international airport serving Western Andalusia in southern Spain, and neighbouring provinces. The airport has flight connections to 20 destinations in Spain and 57 destinations around the rest of Europe and Northern Africa, and handled 8,071,524 passengers in 2023. It serves as a base for the low-cost carriers Vueling and Ryanair. It is 10 kilometres (6.2 mi) east of central Seville, and some 110 kilometres (68 mi) north-east of Costa de la Luz. Seville Airport is also known as San Pablo Airport to distinguish it from the older Tablada Aerodrome, which was in operation as a military aerodrome until 1990.

== Facilities ==
Seville Airport is capable of handling ten million passengers a year. There are 23 stands (all of which are self-maneuvering) 16 of which are remote. The airport has 42 check-in desks and 19 boarding gates. It was expanded in 1991 for the Seville Expo '92. In 2013, a new five-story car parking building was opened. In 2019, renovations to increase the airport's capacity began and were completed in 2022. These renovations increased the airport's handling capacity from six million passengers a year to its current capacity of ten million passengers a year.

In the airport grounds, there is an Airbus factory (San Pablo Sur), an Airbus maintenance center (San Pablo Norte) and a Ryanair maintenance center.

== History ==
In 1914, the first plane flying between the peninsula and Morocco landed at the improvised aerodrome of Tablada, which had been fitted out the previous year for an air festival. Following this, the municipal government of Seville handed over a plot of land measuring to the Military Aeronautical Society for the construction of an aerodrome. Work on the aerodrome began in 1915 and that same year it began to be used for training pilots and observers.

In 1919, the first commercial flights were operated between Seville and Madrid. The following year, an air postal service was established between Seville and Larache and in 1921, the first Spanish commercial service between Seville and Larache was set up. In 1923, various facilities such as hangars, workshops and premises were opened and approval was given for the construction of a municipal airport in Tablada at one end of the military aerodrome airfield, measuring 750 by 500 m (2,460 by 1,640 ft).

In April 1927, Unión Aérea Española established the air service Madrid-Seville-Lisbon. In February 1929, the Seville airport project was approved and in March, the Tablada aerodrome was opened to flights and air traffic. It was decided that this service would cease once the planned airport was constructed.

In 1929, the first flight was operated between Madrid and Seville and in 1930, this was extended to the Canary Islands. In February 1931, the service between Berlin and Barcelona was extended to Seville. In December 1933, LAPE began a service between Seville and the Canary Islands.

During the Spanish Civil War, Seville became the arrival point for African troops, whilst Iberia served air transport with flights between Tetuán-Seville-Vitoria, Seville-Salamanca and Seville-Larache-Las Palmas.

In September 1945, work began on the new Seville transoceanic airport in the land area that occupied the old blimp mooring station, which received the last flight in 1936. The work started with construction of runways 05/23, 02/20 and 09/27. One year later, it was classified as a customs point and runways 05/23 and 02/20 were asphalted. In 1948, a goniometer was installed, the runway lighting was completed, and the runways became known as 04/22, 18/36 and 09/27. In 1956, runway 09/27 was extended and runway 18/36 became a taxiway. Tablada was relegated to serve as a military aerodrome, until its closure in 1990.

In 1957, works were carried out on the terminal building and the control tower. Seville Airport was then included in the Spanish American Agreement for the installation of a supplies base. The facilities were developed near the threshold of 04, rendering the runway out of service.

In 1965, an Instrument Landing System was installed. Between 1971 and 1975, the terminal area was renovated, the apron was extended, a new terminal building was constructed and new access roads were developed.

In 1989, with a focus on the Seville Expo '92, the apron was extended, and a new access from the national motorway N-IV was opened; a new terminal building and a new control tower to the south of the runway were also built. The old terminal was repurposed as a cargo terminal. On 31 July, the new installations were inaugurated.

A program designed to cope with rapid passenger growth and increase the airport's capacity to 10 million passengers per year began in 2019 and was finished in 2022. The terminal building was enlarged and some of the old facilities were renovated, and the power station was reformed to cope with future enlargements of the airport.

== Airlines and destinations ==
The following airlines operate regular scheduled and charter flights at Seville Airport:

Airlines	Destinations
Aegean Airlines	Seasonal: Athens
Aer Lingus	Seasonal: Dublin
Air Canada	Seasonal: Montréal–Trudeau (begins 9 September 2027)
Air Europa	Madrid
Air France	Paris–Charles de Gaulle
Air Serbia	Belgrade
Binter Canarias	Gran Canaria, Tenerife–North
British Airways	London–Gatwick
easyJet	Amsterdam, Basel/Mulhouse, Berlin, Bristol, Geneva, Hamburg, Liverpool, London–Gatwick, Lyon, Milan–Malpensa
Edelweiss Air	Zürich
Eurowings	Düsseldorf
Iberia	Almería, Madrid, Melilla, Valencia; Seasonal: Lanzarote
Lufthansa	Frankfurt
Lufthansa City Airlines	Munich
Norwegian Air Shuttle	Seasonal: Copenhagen (begins 24 March 2027), Oslo (begins 20 March 2027)
Pegasus Airlines	Istanbul–Sabiha Gökçen
Royal Air Maroc	Casablanca
Ryanair	Alicante, Barcelona, Birmingham, Bologna, Budapest, Cagliari, Catania, Brussels-Charleroi, Cologne/Bonn, Cork, Dublin, Edinburgh, Eindhoven, Fuerteventura, Ibiza, Karlsruhe/Baden-Baden, Krakow, Lanzarote, Lisbon, London–Luton, London–Stansted, Malta, Manchester, Marrakesh, Marseille, Milan-Bergamo, Milan–Malpensa, Nantes, Naples, Nuremberg, Palma de Mallorca, Paris-Beauvais, Pisa, Porto, Prague, Rabat, Rome–Fiumicino, Santiago de Compostela, Tangier, Tenerife–South, Toulouse, Venice-Treviso, Turin, Valencia, Venice, Vienna, Vitoria, Warsaw–Chopin, Weeze, Wrocław; Seasonal: Bari, Luxembourg, Menorca, Trapani, Trieste
Scandinavian Airlines	Seasonal: Copenhagen
TAP Air Portugal	Lisbon
Transavia	Amsterdam, Bordeaux, Brest, Brussels, Eindhoven, Lyon, Marseille, Montpellier, Nantes, Paris–Orly, Rennes, Rotterdam/The Hague
Turkish Airlines	Istanbul
Volotea	Asturias, Bilbao, Bordeaux, Florence, Lille, Madrid, Olbia, Pamplona, San Sebastián, Santander, Verona
Vueling	Barcelona, Bilbao, Fuerteventura, Gran Canaria, Ibiza, Lanzarote, London–Gatwick, London–Heathrow, Menorca, Palma de Mallorca, Paris–Charles de Gaulle, Santiago de Compostela, Tenerife–North, Valencia; Seasonal: Essaouira, Nice
Wizz Air	Bucharest–Otopeni, London–Luton, Madrid, Milan–Malpensa, Rome–Fiumicino, Venice, Warsaw–Chopin

== Statistics ==
=== Annual traffic ===
Traffic by calendar year
	Passengers	Movements	Cargo (kilos)
2004	2,678,595	44,231	5,053,487
2005	3,521,112	55,423	6,352,705
2006	3,871,785	58,576	11,582,808
2007	4,507,264	65,092	7,395,854
2008	4,392,148	65,067	6,102,264
2009	4,051,392	55,601	4,983,425
2010	4,224,718	54,499	5,466,982
2011	4,959,359	56,021	5,126,653
2012	4,292,020	48,520	4,773,533
2013	3,687,714	41,591	5,089,015
2014	3,885,434	42,379	5,667,539
2015	4,308,845	46,086	6,007,279
2016	4,625,314	45,840	6,626,457
2017	5,108,817	48,661	10,715,967
2018	6,380,483	57,913	12,517,152
2019	7,544,357	64,112	9,891,790
2020	2,315,825	33,640	9,633,591
2021	3,444,465	43,841	9,126,189
2022	6,779,453	60,363	9,966,098
2023	8,071,524	64,774	10,913,974
Source: Aena Statistics

=== Busiest routes ===
Busiest European routes from SVQ (2023)
Rank	Destination	Passengers	Change 2022/23
1	London-Gatwick	357,547	▲51%
2	Paris-Orly	252,590	▲15%
3	Paris-Charles de Gaulle	215,688	▼5%
4	Lisbon	179,011	▲26%
5	London-Stansted	174,491	▲18%
6	Amsterdam	148,981	▲6%
7	Eindhoven	116,704	▲10%
8	Charleroi	108.490	▲24%
9	Bergamo	98,107	▲44%
10	Rome-Ciampino	96,774	▲34%
11	Dublin	87,678	▲38%
12	Munich	85,256	0%
13	Nantes	83,058	▲10%
14	Bologna	77,208	▲31%
15	Marseille	75,932	▲17%
16	Porto	73,567	▲64%
17	Rome-Fiumicino	67,128	▲88%
18	Frankfurt	66,060	▼7%
19	Milan-Malpensa	62,922	▲23%
20	Treviso	62,054	▲56%
Source: Estadísticas de tráfico aereo

Busiest intercontinental routes from SVQ (2023)
Rank	Destination	Passengers	Change 2022/23
1	Marrakech	53,271	▲49%
2	Tangier	40,138	▲44%
3	Rabat	34,848	▲67%
4	Casablanca	12,604	▲927%
5	Tétouan	11,622	▼30%
Source: Estadísticas de tráfico aereo

Busiest domestic routes from SVQ (2023)
Rank	Destination	Passengers	Change 2022/23
1	Barcelona	1,011,777	▲9%
2	Palma de Mallorca	480,256	▲12%
3	Madrid	452,666	▲17%
4	Bilbao	382,254	▲24%
5	Tenerife-North	313,824	▲14%
6	Gran Canaria	279,271	▲7%
7	Valencia	258,865	▲32%
8	Santiago de Compostela	228,104	▲25%
9	Ibiza	146,732	▲14%
10	Lanzarote	110,934	▲42%
11	Asturias	90,287	▼23%
12	Fuerteventura	79,493	▲10%
13	Tenerife-South	62,752	▲22%
14	Santander	61,433	▲95%
15	Alicante	57,965	▲5%
16	Vitoria	42,571	▲18%
17	San Sebastián	24,414	▲8%
18	Menorca	23,945	▼40%
19	Almería	22,593	▼8%
20	Melilla	20,657	▲16%
Source: Estadísticas de tráfico aereo

== Ground transportation ==
=== Public transport ===
Urban Transport Line of Seville Airport Express connects the bus station Plaza de Armas, in the centre of the city with the airport. It has intermediate stops at strategic points of the city, including the AVE train station of Santa Justa. The whole trip takes approximately 40 minutes. Buses run from 04.30 till 00.45.

== Incidents and accidents ==
- On 17 October 1939 an Ala Littoria Savoia-Marchetti S.73 operating a flight with 17 to Melilla crashed near Málaga due to intense fog. The plane descended to have visibility and crashed into a hill. All passengers and 5 crew members were killed.
- On 18 December 1939 an Iberia Junkers Ju 52 M-CABA operating a flight with 10 from Tétouan crashed at sea during a storm. All passengers and crew were killed.
- On 12 October 1962 an Iberia Convair CV-440 operating a flight with 18 from Valencia Airport crashed while descending near the airport. All passengers and crew were killed.
- On 23 June 1998 an Iberia Boeing 727 operating a flight with 131 to Barcelona was hijacked. The hijacker told that there was a bomb in the plane and forced the crew to go to Tel Aviv, Israel. The plane landed in Valencia for refueling, while the Spanish National Police determined that the hijacker had a mental disorder and that there was no bomb on board. Some hours later the hijacker surrendered. No one was injured.
- On 18 March 2006 an Air Algérie Boeing 737-600 7T-VJQ operating flight 2652 with 107 from Tindouf broke his landing gear during landing and rolled over to the right side. There were 45 injured and the airport was closed for a day for clean-up.
- On 20 April 2011 a Vueling Airbus A320-200 EC-GRH operating flight VY2220 with 150 from Barcelona to Seville aborted landing due to the nose gear stuck in a 90 degrees position the aircraft performed a low approach and the aircraft made a safe emergency landing on runway 27.
- The 2015 Seville A400M crash took place near the airport.
