= Fuerteventura Airport =

Fuerteventura Airport Aeropuerto de Fuerteventura

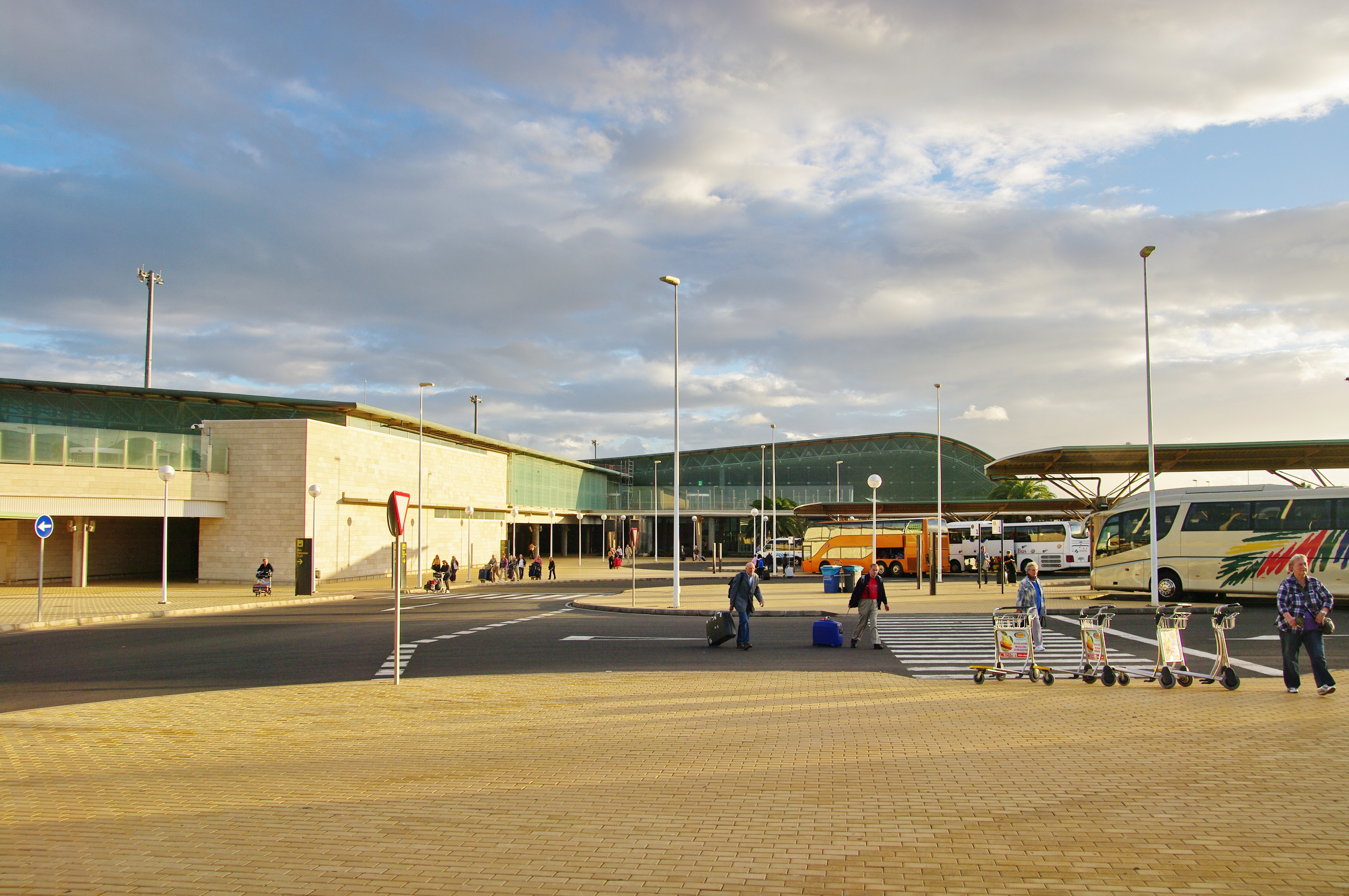
- IATA: FUE; ICAO: GCFV

Summary
- Airport type: Public
- Owner/Operator: AENA
- Serves: Fuerteventura
- Location: Puerto del Rosario
- Elevation AMSL: 25 m (82 ft)
- Coordinates: 28°27′10″N 013°51′50″W
- Website: aena.es

Map
- Location within Spain

Runways
Direction	Length		Surface
Direction	m	ft	Surface
01/19	3,406	11,175	Asphalt

Statistics (2022)
- Passengers: 5,641,500
- Passenger change 21-22: ▲81.2%
- Aircraft movements: 48,690
- Movements change 21-22: ▲44.9%
- Sources: Passenger Traffic, AENA; Spanish AIP, ENAIRE

Fuerteventura Airport (IATA: FUE, ICAO: GCFV), also known as El Matorral Airport, is an airport serving the Spanish island of Fuerteventura. It is situated in El Matorral, 5 km (3 mi) southwest of the capital city Puerto del Rosario. The airport has flight connections to over 80 destinations worldwide, and over 5.6 million passengers passed through it in 2019.

The airport has one terminal building with two floors. The ground floor has two sections; one section is for flight arrivals and the other for flight departures. The first floor has the departures lounge and 24 boarding gates. In total, the terminal covers over 92,000 m^{2} and it has the capacity to handle 8.2 million passengers per year.

== History ==
=== Development since the 1990s ===
In 1994, construction started on a new terminal building, an aircraft apron, a taxiway parallel to the runway, a power plant and a new access road. The works were completed with the extension of the car park and a detour on the Puerto de Rosario–Matorral road adding some two kilometres, of which 1.5 are double lane. With the new facilities it was possible to handle around five million passengers a year and manage around 3,100 passengers per hour at peak periods.

== Airlines and destinations ==
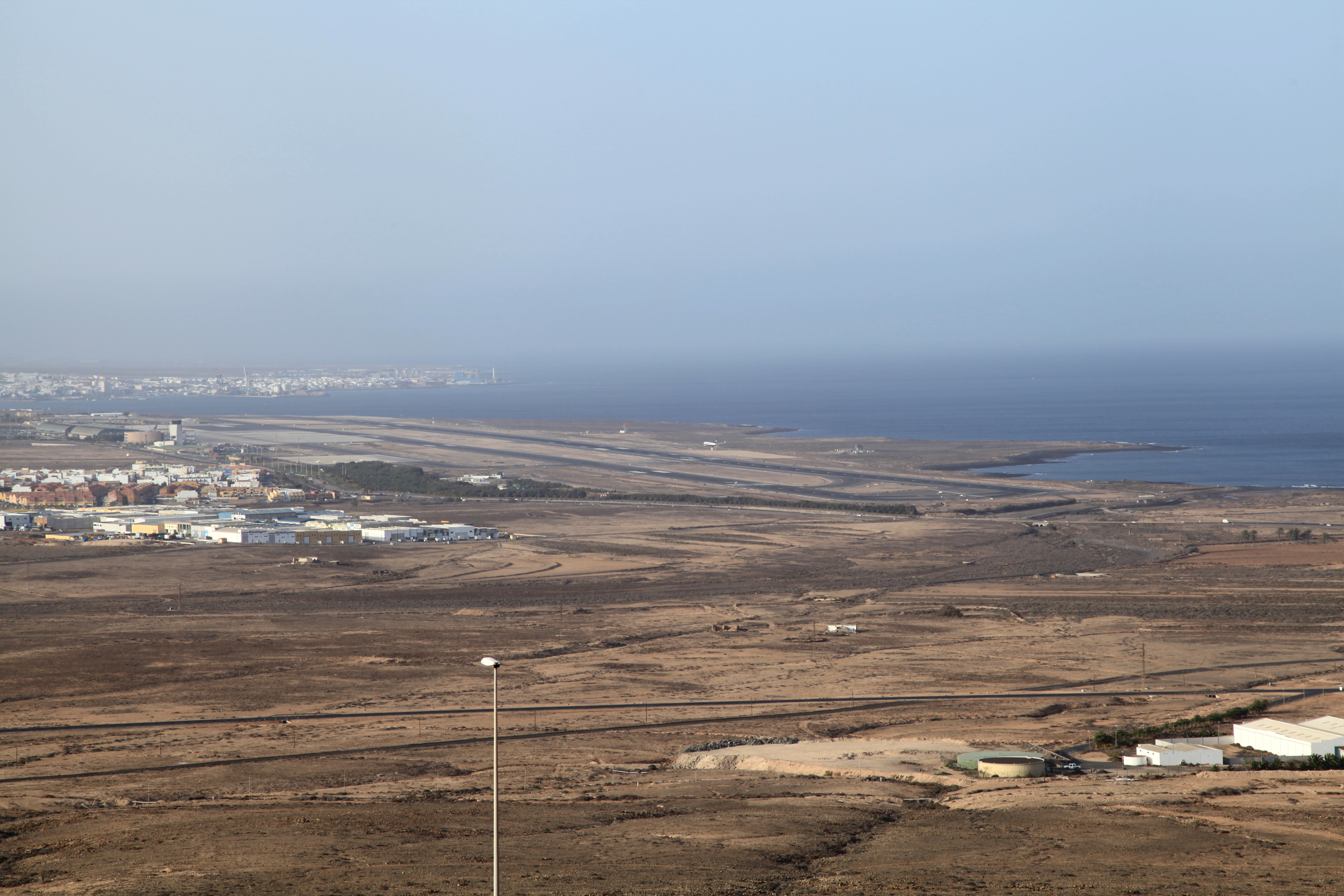
Aerial view

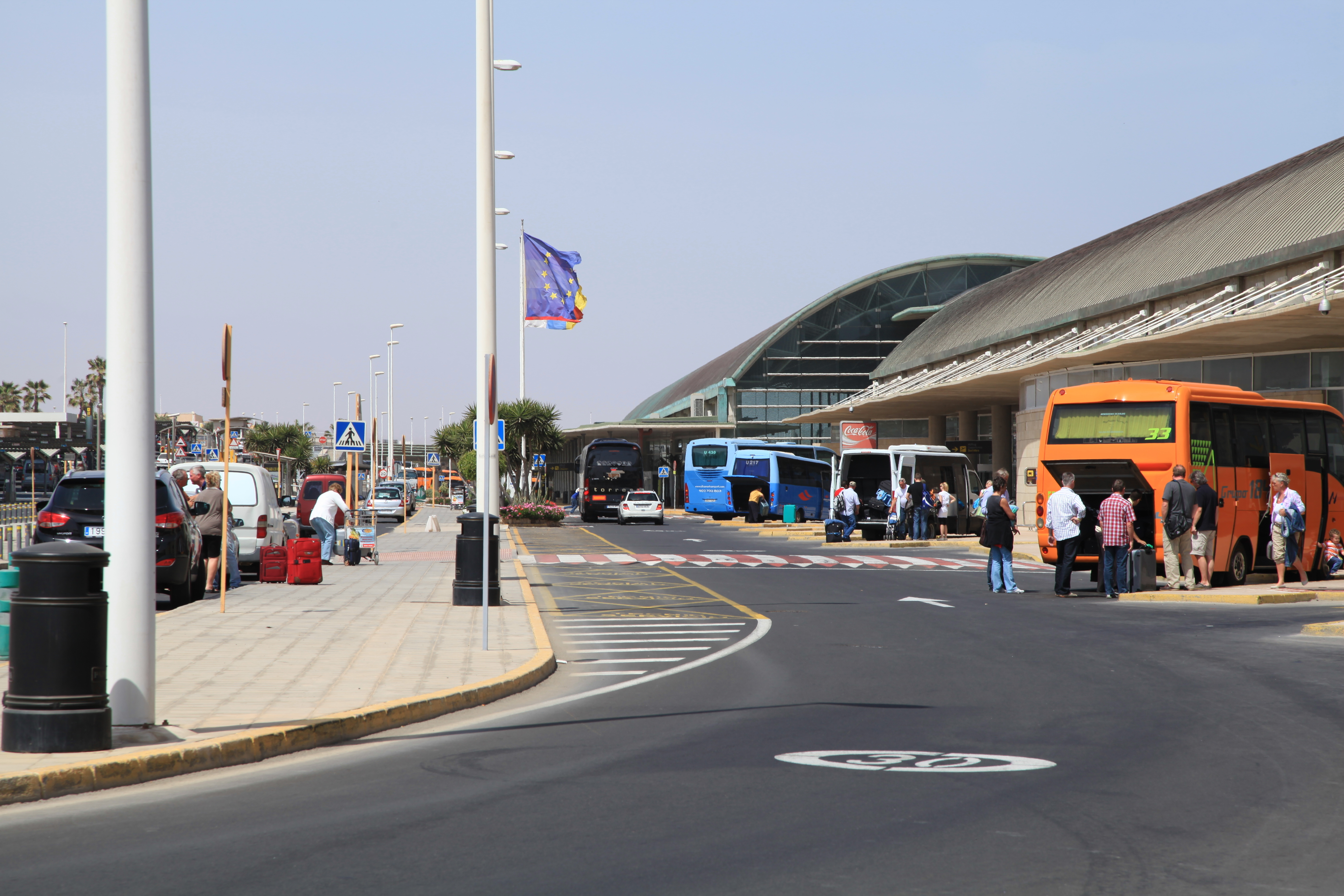
Terminal exterior

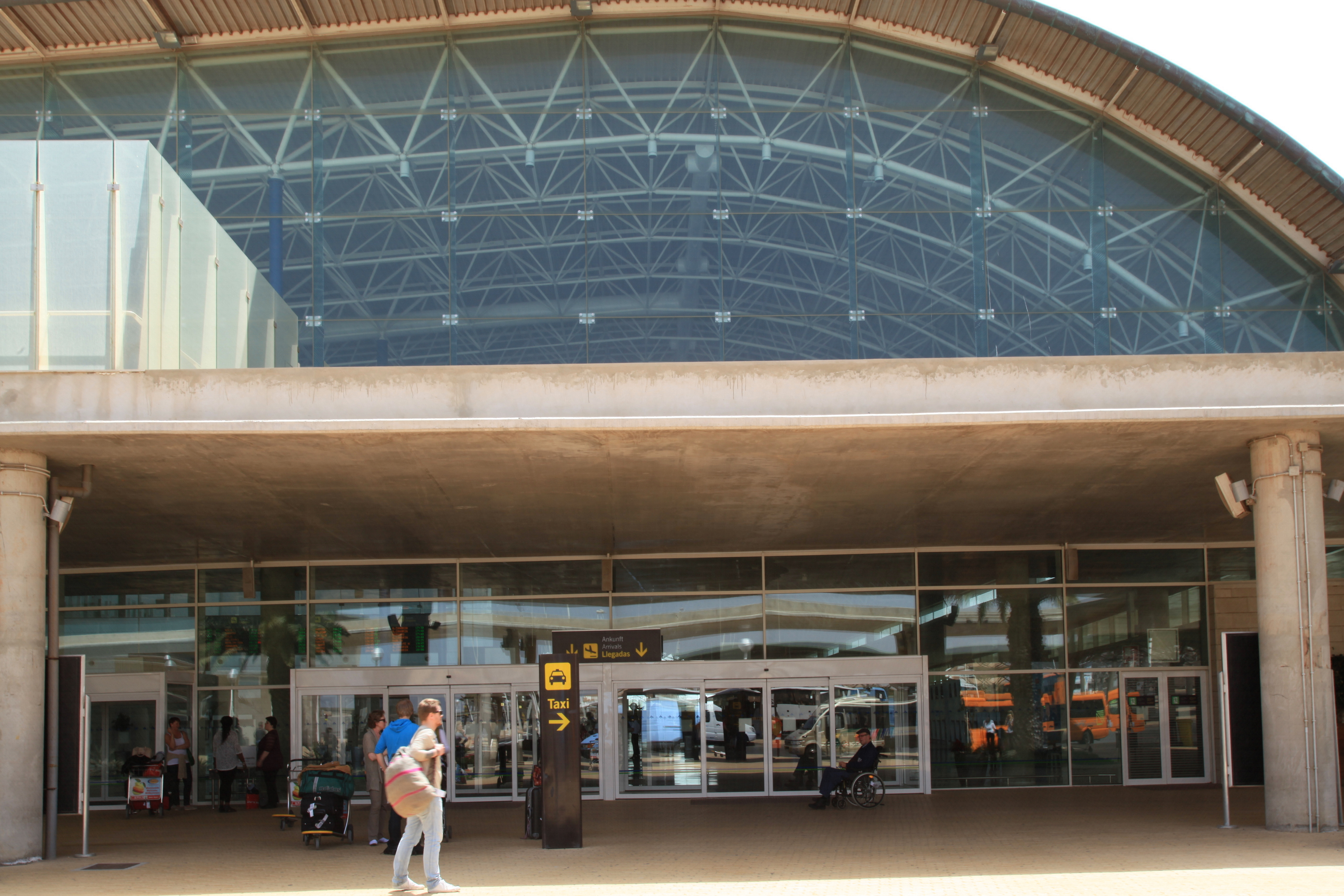
Puerto del Rosario Airport

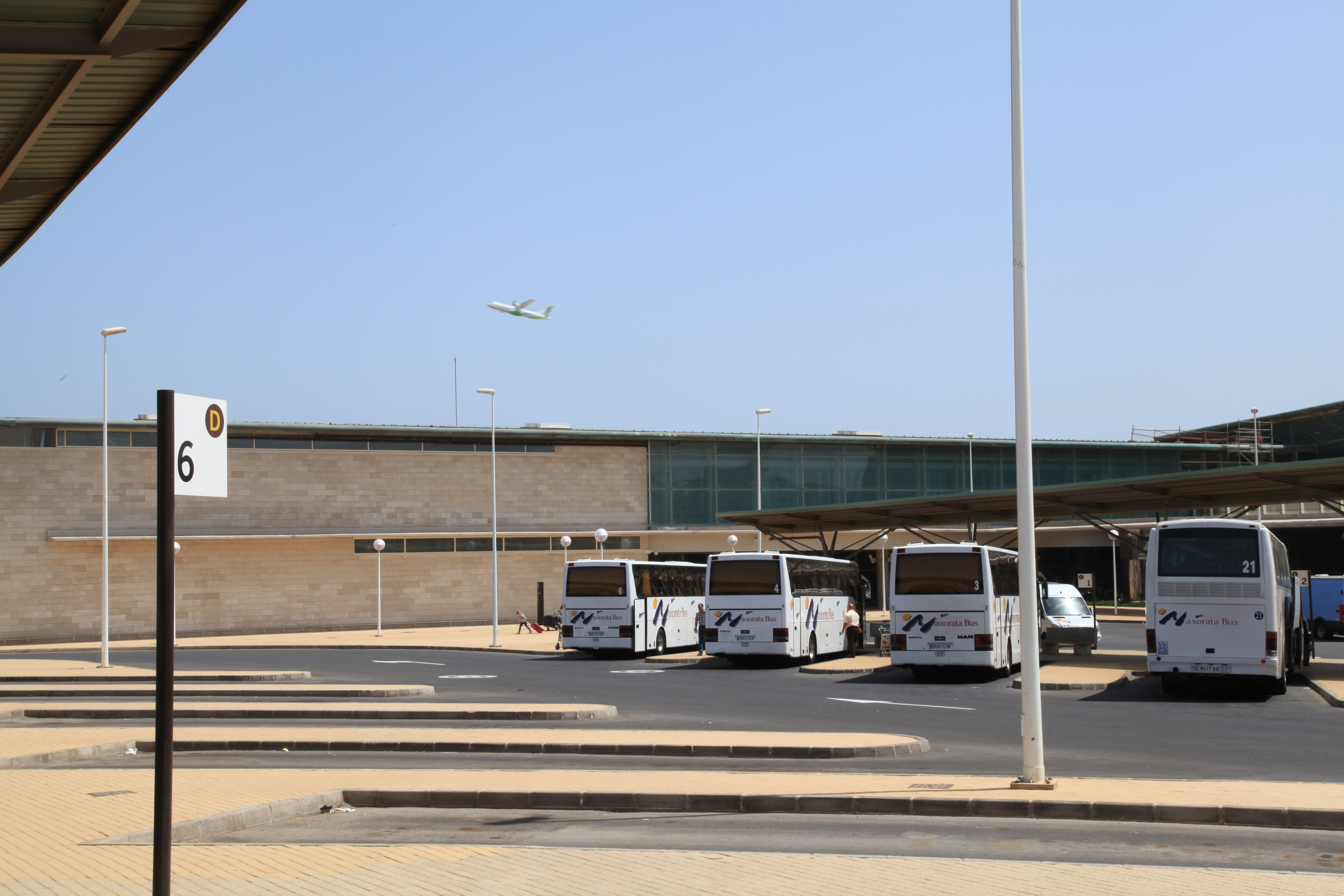
View from the exterior

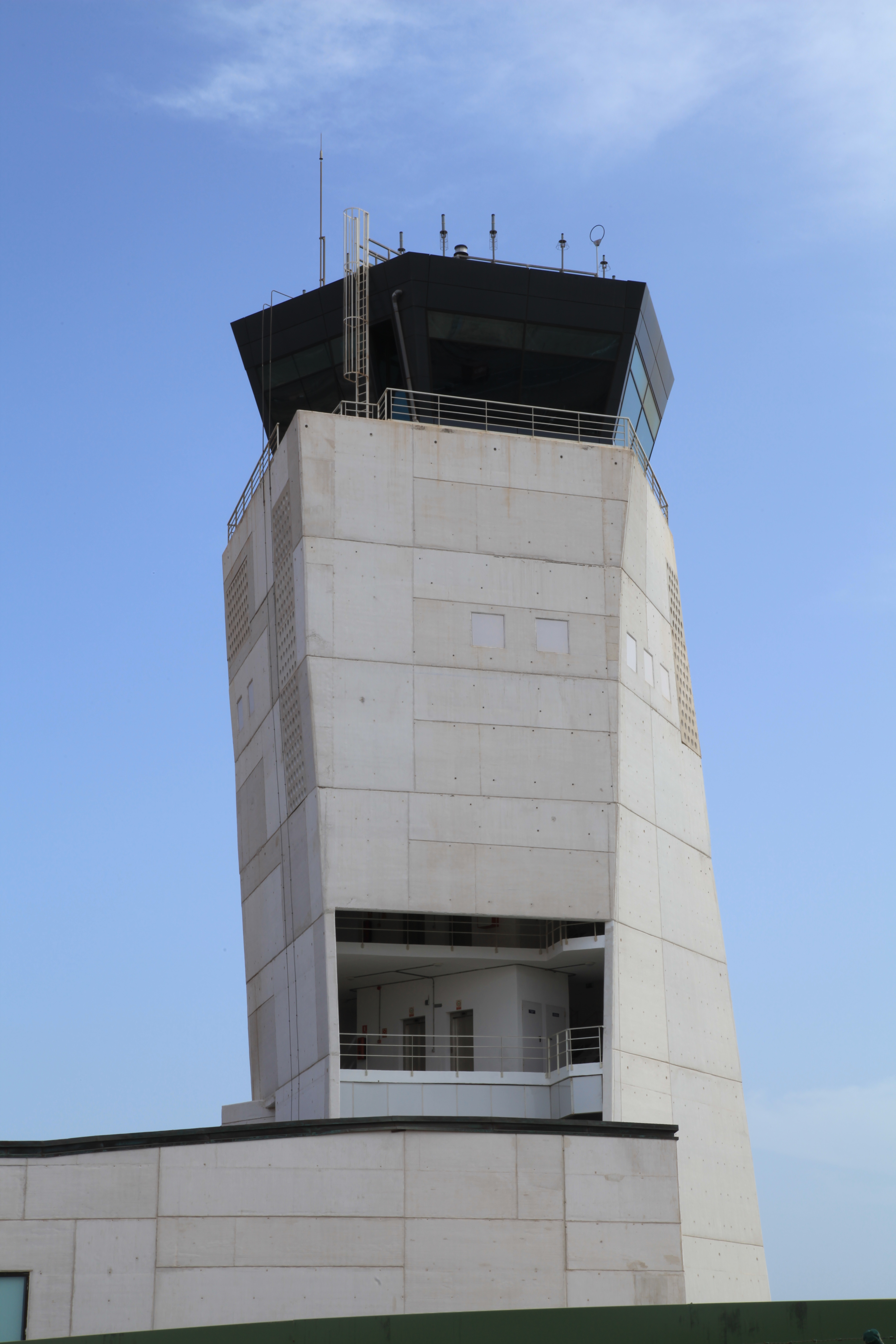
Control tower

The following airlines operate regular scheduled and charter flights at Fuerteventura Airport:

Airlines	Destinations
Aer Lingus	Seasonal: Dublin
Air Nostrum	Seasonal charter: Porto
Binter Canarias	Gran Canaria, La Palma, Tenerife–North; Seasonal: Funchal
British Airways	Seasonal: London–Heathrow (begins 13 December 2026)
Brussels Airlines	Brussels
CanaryFly	Gran Canaria, Tenerife–North
Condor	Düsseldorf, Frankfurt, Hamburg, Munich, Stuttgart; Seasonal: Münster/Osnabrück (begins 2 May 2027), Nuremberg
Corendon Airlines	Cologne/Bonn, Düsseldorf, Hannover
Discover Airlines	Frankfurt, Munich
easyJet	Birmingham, Bristol, Liverpool, London–Gatwick, London–Luton, Manchester, Milan–Malpensa, Newcastle upon Tyne, Paris–Charles de Gaulle; Seasonal: Belfast–International, Glasgow, Naples
Edelweiss Air	Zürich
Eurowings	Cologne/Bonn, Düsseldorf, Hamburg; Seasonal: Berlin, Nuremberg, Prague, Stuttgart
Finnair	Seasonal: Helsinki
Iberia	Madrid; Seasonal: Santiago de Compostela
Jet2.com	Belfast–International, Birmingham, Bournemouth, Bristol, East Midlands, Edinburgh, Glasgow, Leeds/Bradford, Liverpool, London–Gatwick, London–Luton, London–Stansted, Manchester, Newcastle upon Tyne
LEAV Aviation	Seasonal: Münster Osnabrück
Luxair	Luxembourg
Marabu	Cologne/Bonn
Neos	Bologna, Milan–Malpensa, Rome–Fiumicino, Verona
Ryanair	Bergamo, Birmingham, Bologna, Bristol, Cologne/Bonn, Cork, Dublin, East Midlands, Edinburgh, Kraków, Leeds/Bradford, London–Stansted, Manchester, Newcastle upon Tyne, Pisa, Santiago de Compostela, Seville, Shannon, Vienna, Weeze; Seasonal: Bournemouth, Liverpool, London–Luton, Milan–Malpensa
Scandinavian Airlines	Seasonal: Copenhagen; Seasonal charter: Oslo
Smartwings	Brno, Prague, Warsaw–Chopin; Seasonal charter: Budapest
Sundair	Berlin, Bremen, Dresden, Münster/Osnabrück
TAP Air Portugal	Lisbon
Transavia	Amsterdam
TUI Airways	Cardiff, London–Gatwick, Manchester
TUI fly Belgium	Brussels
TUI fly Deutschland	Düsseldorf, Frankfurt, Hannover, Munich, Stuttgart
TUI fly Netherlands	Amsterdam, Rotterdam
Volotea	Asturias, Nantes; Seasonal: Lille
Vueling	Barcelona, Bilbao, Málaga, Paris–Orly, Santiago de Compostela, Seville
Wizz Air	Santiago de Compostela (begins 2 February 2027); Seasonal: Katowice, Warsaw–Chopin

== Statistics ==
Year	Passengers	Aircraft movements	Cargo (tonnes)
2000	3,467,614	31,663	4,487
2001	3,577,638	30,471	3,837
2002	3,620,576	32,520	3,712
2003	3,919,224	39,695	3,694
2004	3,917,109	39,865	3,639
2005	4,071,875	40,415	3,178
2006	4,458,711	44,044	3,196
2007	4,629,877	44,870	3,127
2008	4,492,003	44,552	2,722
2009	3,738,492	36,429	1,913
2010	4,173,686	39,437	1,710
2011	4,948,018	44,551	1,557
2012	4,399,023	37,772	1,214
2013	4,259,341	35,498	1,022
2014	4,764,632	40,066	978
2015	5,027,415	39,307	937
2016	5,676,323	45,456	945
2017	6,049,291	48,216	946
2018	6,118,893	51,541	874
2019	5,635,417	47.223	735
Source: Aena Statistics

=== Busiest routes ===
Busiest international routes from FUE (2023)
Rank	Destination	Passengers	Change 2022/23
1	Düsseldorf	297,986	▲8%
2	Manchester	271,122	▲19%
3	Frankfurt	251,962	▲8%
4	London-Gatwick	191,602	▲20%
5	Hamburg	177,154	▲13%
6	London-Stansted	175,354	▲11%
7	Birmingham	160,573	▲9%
8	Munich	143,352	0%
9	Hannover	114,607	▲3%
10	Stuttgart	112,342	▲26%
11	Bristol	106,282	▲16%
12	Cologne/Bonn	101,001	▼20%
13	Amsterdam	100,214	▼3%
14	Edinburgh	98,319	▲20%
15	Dublin	97,116	▲51%
16	Berlin	95,869	▲2%
17	Leeds/Bradford	92,002	▲14%
18	Newcastle	78,437	▲17%
19	London-Luton	78,058	▼12%
20	Paris-Orly	77,268	▲19%
Source: Estadísticas de tráfico aereo

Busiest domestic routes from FUE (2023)
Rank	Destination	Passengers	Change 2022/23
1	Gran Canaria	653,628	▲10%
2	Madrid	414,160	▲6%
3	Tenerife-North	323,889	▲7%
4	Barcelona	153,905	▲4%
5	Seville	79,477	▲10%
6	Santiago de Compostela	74,114	▲29%
7	Bilbao	39,769	▼11%
8	Valencia	20,241	▼6%
9	Málaga	18,615	▼8%
10	Asturias	10,577	▲8%
Source: Estadísticas de tráfico aereo
