= Santiago–Rosalía de Castro Airport =

International airport in Spain

Santiago–Rosalía de Castro Airport Aeropuerto de Santiago–Rosalía de Castro Aeroporto de Santiago–Rosalía de Castro

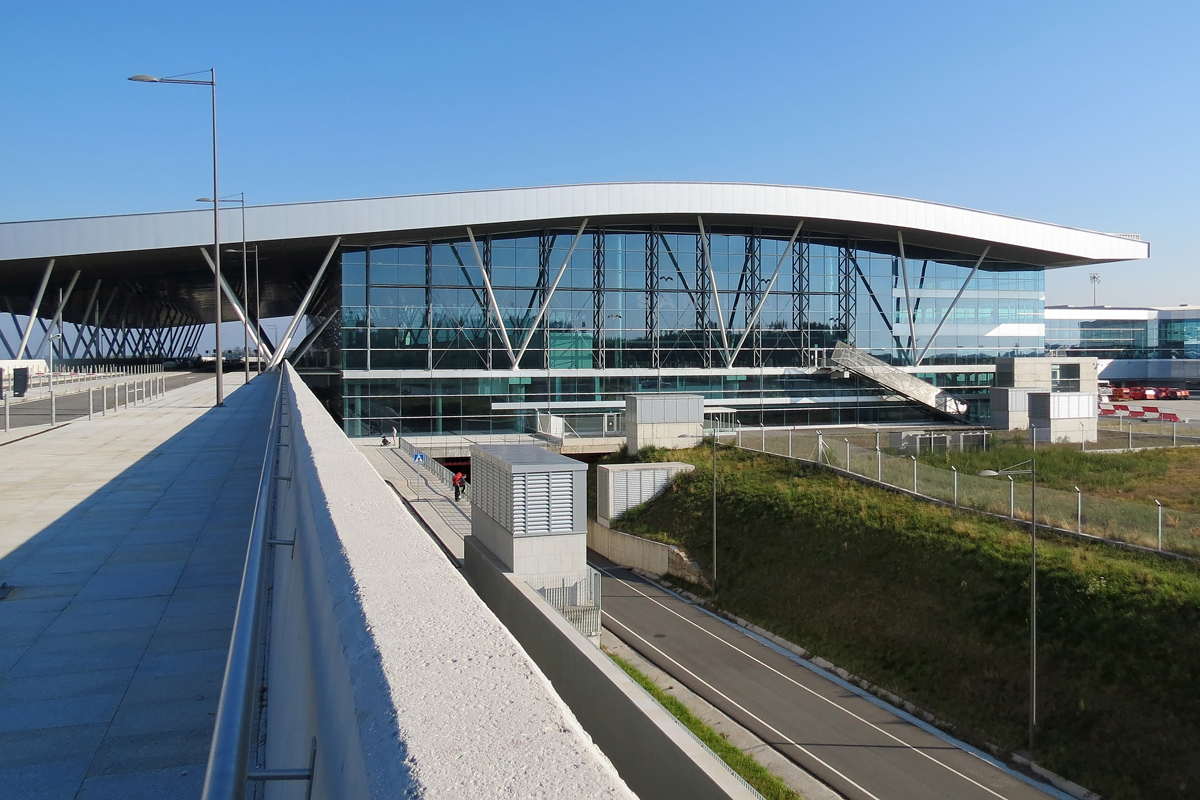
- IATA: SCQ; ICAO: LEST; WMO: 8041

Summary
- Airport type: Public/military
- Owner/Operator: AENA
- Serves: Santiago, Spain
- Location: Santiago de Compostela
- Focus city for: Vueling; Wizz Air (from December 2026)
- Built: 1932
- Elevation AMSL: 1,213 ft (370 m)
- Coordinates: 42°53′47″N 08°24′55″W
- Website: www.aena.es/en/santiago-rosalia-de-castro.html

Map
- Location within Spain

Runways
| Direction | Length | | Surface |
| Direction | ft | m | Surface |
|---|---|---|---|
| 17/35 | 10,499 | 3,200 | Asphalt |

Statistics (2025)
- Passengers: 3,120,759
- Passengers change 24-25: ▼14.3%
- Aircraft movements: 24,837
- Movements change 24-25: ▼7.9%

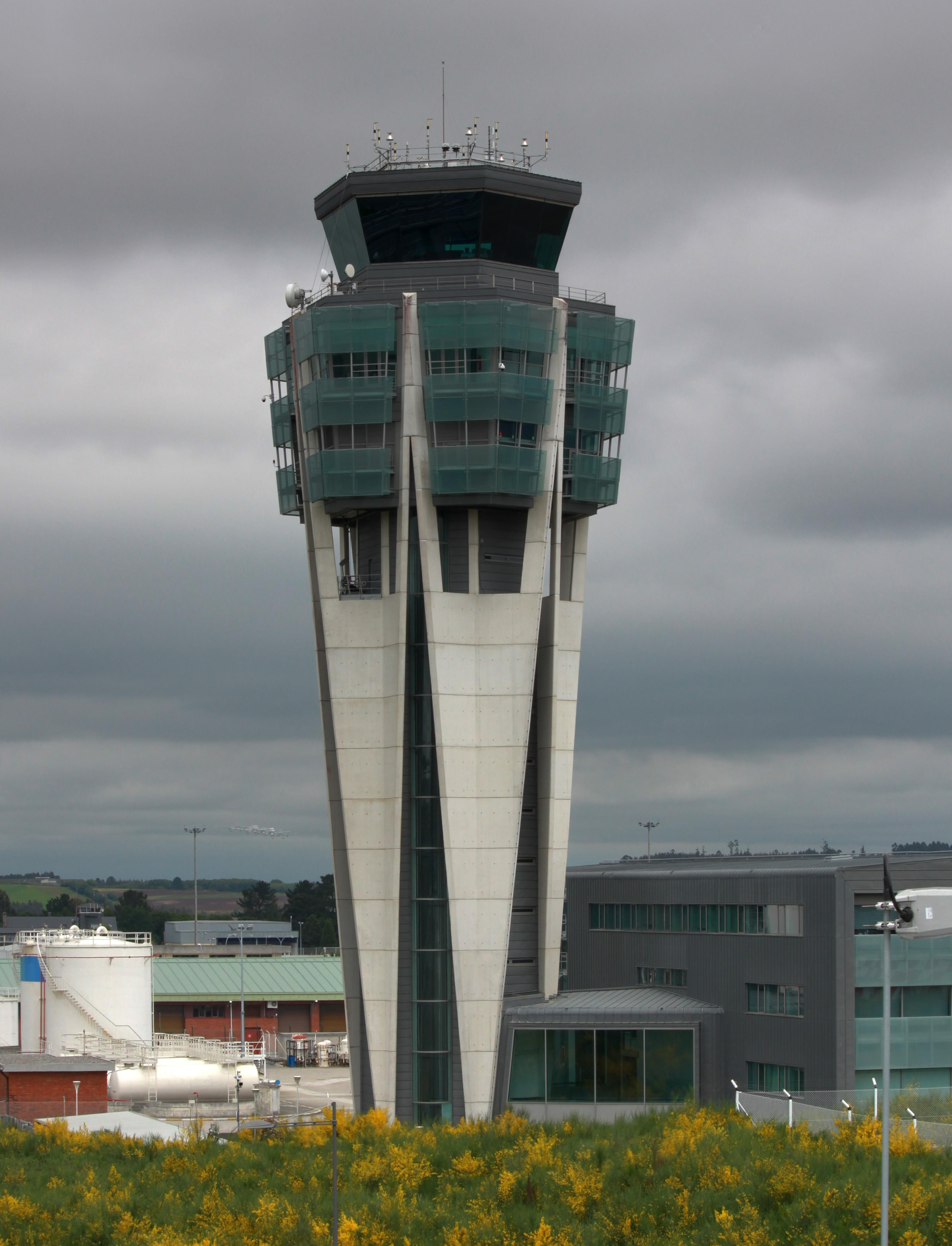
Control tower

Santiago–Rosalía de Castro Airport (Galician: Aeroporto de Santiago-Rosalía de Castro, Spanish: Aeropuerto de Santiago-Rosalía de Castro) (IATA: SCQ, ICAO: LEST), previously named Lavacolla Airport and also known as Santiago de Compostela Airport, is an international airport serving the autonomous community and historic nationality of Galicia in Spain. It is the biggest and busiest airport in Galicia and the second-busiest airport in northern Spain after Bilbao Airport. It has been named after the Galician romanticist writer and poet Rosalía de Castro, since 12 March 2020.

The airport is located in the parish of Lavacolla, 12 km east of Santiago de Compostela and handled 3,640,664 passengers in 2024.

It is the focus city of Vueling in the northwest Iberian Peninsula. In July 2026, Wizz Air announced that it will open a base at the airport in December 2026, the airline's first in the Galicia–North Portugal Euroregion

The Christian pilgrimage route of the Camino de Santiago runs near the airport.

== History ==
The airport was set up by a group of aviation enthusiasts in October 1932 and two months directors were chosen to select where the airport was going to be built. In 1935 construction work started at the airport where two years later on 27 September 1937 the first scheduled flight from Santiago de Compostela took place. After the Spanish Civil war, political prisoners held in the concentration camp of Lavacolla were forced to work in the construction of the airport.

In 1969 a new terminal was built at the airport. It later underwent several expansions, including a remodeling in 1993.

In June 1980, Iberia launched a seasonal flight to New York City on a Boeing 747. This was Santiago de Compostela's first transatlantic route. Four months later, Viasa added non-stop service to Caracas using McDonnell Douglas DC-10s. In 1981, a cargo terminal was built, giving the airport capacity to handle cargo flights. Viasa shut down in 1997, but Avensa reinstated the route to Caracas in March 1999. United resumed intercontinental flights to the Americas with a new route to Newark that started in May 2026.

On 13 October 2011, a new passenger terminal opened at the airport.

On 23 April 2026 through 27 May 2026 the airport was closed to all air traffic for major runway renovation.

== Terminal ==
The airport currently has one operating terminal. The old terminal at Santiago de Compostela airport opened in 1969 and was often expanded. The old terminal closed on the night of 13 October 2011 when operations transferred to the new terminal.

The new terminal at Santiago de Compostela Airport officially opened on 13 October 2011 and passenger operations transferred there the following day. It is adjacent to the old terminal and has a size of 74,000 sq m. It has 22 check-in desks, three security checkpoints, four baggage carousels, and 13 gates of which five have jet bridges. The baggage hall is split into two zones, one for Schengen Area flights and one for non-Schengen. It can handle as many as 4 million passengers per year. The terminal is due to be expanded in the future. This includes adding another five jet bridges to five of the current gates, as well as three more baggage carousels and an expanded shopping area.

== Airlines and destinations ==
The following airlines operate regular scheduled and charter flights at Santiago–Rosalía de Castro Airport:

| Airlines | Destinations |
|---|---|
| Aer Lingus | Seasonal: Cork, Dublin |
| easyJet | Basel/Mulhouse, Geneva |
| Edelweiss Air | Seasonal: Zurich |
| Fly2Galicia | Alicante (begins 2 December 2026), Brussels (begins 1 December 2026), Granada (begins 3 December 2026), Milan–Malpensa (begins 1 December 2026), Munich (begins 3 December 2026), Prague (begins 2 December 2026), Venice (begins 2 December 2026), Zaragoza (begins 1 December 2026) |
| Iberia | Bilbao, Madrid; Seasonal: Melilla |
| KLM | Seasonal: Amsterdam |
| Lufthansa | Seasonal: Frankfurt |
| Norwegian Air Shuttle | Seasonal: Copenhagen (begins 19 June 2027) |
| Ryanair | Lanzarote, London–Stansted, Tenerife–South; Seasonal: Alicante, Barcelona, Charleroi, Dublin, Ibiza |
| TUI Airways | Seasonal: London–Gatwick (begins 31 March 2027) |
| United Airlines | Seasonal: Newark |
| Vueling | Barcelona, Fuerteventura, Gran Canaria, Lanzarote, London–Gatwick, Málaga, Palma de Mallorca, Paris–Orly, Seville, Tenerife–North, Valencia, Zurich; Seasonal: Amsterdam, Bilbao, Ibiza, Jerez de la Frontera, Marrakesh |
| Wizz Air | Bilbao, Fuerteventura (begins 19 December 2026), Gran Canaria (begins 18 December 2026), Madrid, Málaga (begins 17 December 2026), Rome–Fiumicino (begins 14 December 2026), Tenerife–North (begins 17 December 2026), Valencia, Warsaw–Modlin (begins 1 December 2026), Zaragoza (begins 17 December 2026) |

== Statistics ==
During the early 2000s, numbers increased significantly at the airport, from 1.24 million in 2002 to peak at 2.46 million in 2011. Because of the financial crisis in Spain, those numbers decreased to 2.1 million in 2014, with cargo decreasing significantly during that period. The Spanish economic recovery in the mid-2010s and the rise of Santiago de Compostela as an international destination are again increasing cargo and passenger numbers, breaking the 3 million passenger mark for the first time in 2022.

=== Traffic figures by year ===
| | Passengers handled | Passengers % change | Aircraft movements | Aircraft % change | Freight (tonnes) | Freight % change |
|---|---|---|---|---|---|---|
| 2000 | 1,332,893 | - | 19,660 | - | 6,773 | - |
| 2001 | 1,281,334 | ▼3.86% | 19,084 | ▼2.92% | 6,228 | ▼8.04% |
| 2002 | 1,240,730 | ▼3.16% | 17.362 | ▼9.02% | 5,716 | ▼8.22% |
| 2003 | 1,381,826 | ▲11.37% | 18,454 | ▲6.28% | 5,318 | ▼6.96% |
| 2004 | 1,580,675 | ▲14.39% | 21,593 | ▲17.00% | 4,938 | ▼7.14% |
| 2005 | 1,843,118 | ▲16.60% | 25,693 | ▲18.98% | 3,805 | ▼22.94% |
| 2006 | 1,994,519 | ▲8.21% | 24,719 | ▼3.79% | 2,587 | ▼32.01% |
| 2007 | 2,050,172 | ▲2.79% | 24,643 | ▼0.30% | 2,749 | ▲6.26% |
| 2008 | 1,917,466 | ▼6.47% | 21,945 | ▼10.94% | 2,418 | ▼12.04% |
| 2009 | 1,944,068 | ▲1.38% | 20,166 | ▼8.10% | 1,988 | ▼17.78% |
| 2010 | 2,172,869 | ▲11.76% | 21,252 | ▲5.38% | 1,964 | ▼1.20% |
| 2011 | 2,464,330 | ▲13.41% | 22,322 | ▲5.03% | 1,787 | ▼9.01% |
| 2012 | 2,194,611 | ▼10.94% | 19,511 | ▼12.59% | 1,815 | ▲1.56% |
| 2013 | 2,073,055 | ▼5.53% | 18,688 | ▼4.21% | 1,929 | ▲6.28% |
| 2014 | 2,083,873 | ▲0.52% | 19,431 | ▲3.97% | 2,095 | ▲8.60% |
| 2015 | 2,296,248 | ▲10.20% | 20,540 | ▲5.70% | 2,311 | ▲10.10% |
| 2016 | 2,510,740 | ▲9.30% | 21,227 | ▲3.60% | 2,936 | ▲27.04% |
| 2017 | 2,644,925 | ▲5.34% | 21,520 | ▲1.38% | 2,693 | ▼8.28% |
| 2018 | 2,724,750 | ▲3.01% | 21,839 | ▲1.50% | 3,019 | ▲12.10% |
| 2019 | 2,903,427 | ▲6.56% | 22,396 | ▲2.55% | 3,201 | ▲6.02% |
| 2020 | 935,394 | ▼67.8% | 10,949 | ▼51.1% | 2,981 | ▼6.9% |
| 2021 | 1,653,821 | ▲76.8% | 15,375 | ▲40.4% | 4,938 | ▲65.6% |
| 2022 | 3,236,619 | ▲95.7% | 25,458 | ▲65.6% | 4,853 | ▼1.7% |
| 2023 | 3,537,445 | ▲9.2% | 25,903 | ▲1.7% | 4,818 | ▼0.7% |
| 2024 | 3,640,664 | ▲2.9% | 26,968 | ▲4.1% | 4,941 | ▲2.6% |
| 2025 | 3,120,759 | ▼14.3% | 24,837 | ▼7.9% | 3,733 | ▼25.6% |

=== Traffic figures by month ===
| | 2025 passengers | 2026 passengers | Passengers % change |
|---|---|---|---|
| January | 187,988 | 133,079 | ▼29.2 |
| February | 185,997 | 130,533 | ▼29.8 |
| March | 244,637 | 172,067 | ▼29.7 |
| April | 284,639 | 164,277 | ▼42.3 |
| May | 302,990 | 31,594 | ▼89.6 |
| June | 310,351 | 277,649 | ▼10.5 |
| July | 340,346 | 305,371 | ▼10.3 |
| August | 346,012 | 308,945 | ▼10.7 |
| September | 303,244 | 280,908 | ▼7.4 |
| October | 276,814 | 263,677 | ▼4.7 |
| November | 157,855 | - | - |
| December | 179,886 | - | - |
Source: Estadísticas de tráfico aereo"

=== Busiest routes ===
Busiest international routes from SCQ (2025)
| Rank | Destination | Passengers | Change 2024/25 |
|---|---|---|---|
| 1 | London-Stansted | 98,227 | ▼13.27% |
| 2 | London-Heathrow | 77,462 | - |
| 3 | London-Gatwick | 68,223 | ▼33.86% |
| 4 | Dublin | 58,427 | ▼25.84% |
| 5 | Geneva | 58,107 | ▼35.27% |
| 6 | Paris-Charles de Gaulle | 53,767 | ▼16.57% |
| 7 | Basel/Mulhouse | 45,629 | ▼16.61% |
| 8 | Frankfurt | 38,331 | ▲20.03% |
| 9 | Charleroi | 20,650 | ▼30.71% |
| 10 | Memmingen | 20,029 | ▼3.25% |
Source: Estadísticas de tráfico aereo

Busiest domestic routes from SCQ (2025)
| Rank | Destination | Passengers | Change 2024/25 |
|---|---|---|---|
| 1 | Barcelona | 461,800 | ▲3.26% |
| 2 | Madrid | 297,717 | ▼35.17% |
| 3 | Seville | 275,869 | ▼2.60% |
| 4 | Palma de Mallorca | 255,233 | ▲3.06% |
| 5 | Málaga | 194,672 | ▼16.76% |
| 6 | Gran Canaria | 185,488 | ▲0.76% |
| 7 | Tenerife-North | 150,084 | ▲21.14% |
| 8 | Valencia | 149,907 | ▼9.21% |
| 9 | Alicante | 142,393 | ▼39.00% |
| 10 | Tenerife-South | 127,717 | ▼17.97% |
Source: Estadísticas de tráfico aereo

== Ground transportation ==
=== Road ===
The airport is linked with Santiago de Compostela (13 km) by the Autovía A-54. This motorway, although some sections are yet to be built and opened, also connects the airport with Lugo (94.5 km), where it connects with the Autovía A-6, providing toll-free motorway access to the rest of Spain; and to the French border through the Autovía A-8 that intersects with the Autovía A-6 near Lugo. Nearby Autopista AP-9 connects the airport directly to A Coruña (66 km), Ferrol (88 km), Pontevedra (75 km), Vigo (100 km) and the Portuguese border. Ourense (116 km) is reachable through the Autopista AP-53 that connects with the Autopista AP-9.

There are several major car rental companies at the airport. The airport has more than 5,000 short and long-term covered parking spaces in the new terminal building. In addition, there are several low-cost, long-term private parking facilities around the airport.

=== Bus services ===
A city bus service connects the airport with the center of Santiago de Compostela and the bus and train terminal in the city regularly. From the station in Santiago de Compostela, private coach operators run direct services in a multiple daily basis to most cities and towns in Galicia, including A Coruña, Ferrol, Lugo, Ourense, Pontevedra and Vigo, as well as long-distance services to the rest of Spain, and international services. In addition, three regional services link the airport directly to A Coruña, to Lugo, including several stops in the French Way of the Camino de Santiago, and to the A Mariña coastal area (home to As Catedrais beach) in the province of Lugo.

=== Rail ===
There are no rail facilities at the airport. However, the train station in Santiago de Compostela, located 12 km. away, is connected to the airport by the city bus service every 30 minutes. There are combined available train+bus tickets to and from the airport. The train station in Santiago de Compostela has regional, medium and long-distance high-speed Alvia services to most cities in Galicia, including A Coruña, Ferrol, Ourense, Pontevedra, Vilagarcía de Arousa and Vigo; and further to Madrid Chamartín and the rest of Spain.

=== Foot and bicycle ===
The Camino de Santiago runs next to the runway of the airport. This is the busiest and final journey in the Camino de Santiago that goes through the famous Monte do Gozo. There are dedicated pathways for both pedestrians and bicyclists towards the city. The walking distance from the runway to the Cathedral is estimated at 10.90 km.

== Accidents and incidents ==
- On 3 March 1978, Iberia Flight 565, a Douglas DC-8-63 jetliner, registration EC-BMX, with 210 passengers and 11 crew members aboard, touched down far down the runway after a high approach, aquaplaned off the runway, dropped into a hollow 20 m deep and caught fire. The crash resulted in 70 injuries, 10 of them serious, but no fatalities.
- On 7 June 2001, a Beechcraft B300C Super King Air 350 twin turboprop, registration F-GOAE, departed from Le Mans-Arnage Airport (LME), France, to Santiago De Compostela Airport (SCQ), Spain, on a cargo flight under instrument flight rules. Near the destination airport, the meteorological conditions were reported to be good, and the crew requested a visual approach to runway 17, even though the active runway was 35. Once cleared to land, the aircraft encountered an unexpected patch of fog, whereupon it began to descend at a high rate — 2000 to 3000 ft/min — then struck some trees in level flight at an airspeed of 148 kt. The wings and engines detached from the fuselage, and it slid along a scrubland area until it came to a stop. The crew suffered minor injuries, but the aircraft was completely destroyed.
- On 2 August 2012, an Airnor Cessna 500 Citation I business jet, registration EC-IBA, flying from Asturias crashed whilst on approach to the airport, resulting in the death of both crew members.
