= Bilbao Airport =

Airport designed by Santiago Calatrava serving Bilbao, Spain

Bilbao Airport Bilboko aireportua Aeropuerto de Bilbao

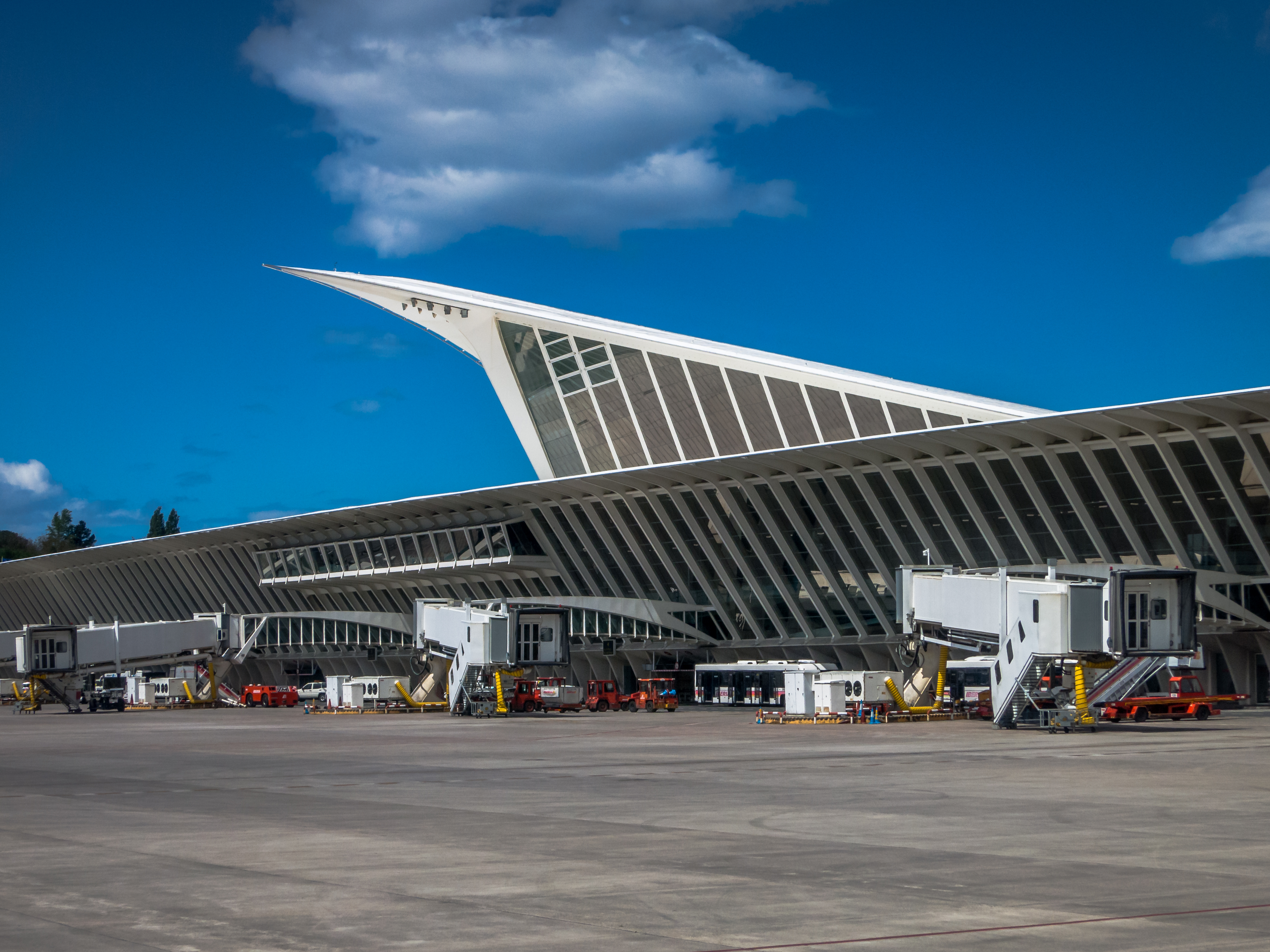
- IATA: BIO; ICAO: LEBB

Summary
- Airport type: Public
- Owner/Operator: AENA
- Serves: Bilbao metropolitan area
- Location: Loiu and Sondika, Biscay, Spain
- Opened: 19 September 1948; 78 years ago
- Operating base for: Volotea; Vueling
- Elevation AMSL: 42 m (138 ft)
- Coordinates: 43°18′04″N 02°54′38″W
- Website: www.aena.es/en/bilbao.html

Map
- Location within Spain

Runways
Direction	Length		Surface
Direction	m	ft	Surface
10/28	2,000	6,562	Asphalt
12/30	2,600	8,530	Asphalt

Statistics (2025)
- Passengers: 7,062,681
- Passenger change 24-25: ▲4.2%
- Aircraft movements: 54,468
- Movements change 24-25: ▲3.7%
- Cargo (t): 1,141
- Cargo change 24-25: ▲23.0%
- Sources: Passenger Traffic, AENA; Spanish AIP, AENA

Bilbao Airport (IATA: BIO, ICAO: LEBB) is a minor international airport located 9 km (5.6 mi) north of Bilbao, in the municipality of Loiu, in Biscay. It is the largest airport in the Basque Country and northern Spain, with 6,336,441 passengers in 2023. It is famous for its new main terminal, which opened in 2000, designed by Santiago Calatrava.

== History ==
=== Foundation and early years ===
On 19 February 1985, an Iberia flight from Madrid crashed into Mount Oiz; all passengers and crew died.

=== Development since 1990 ===
In February 2009, plans were announced to expand the terminal building, the facilities and the car parking so as to double the current capacity to 8 million passengers. The work was expected be finished in 2014 and cost €114 million but in 2010 the Spanish Government announced the project would be delayed by at least five years due to spending cuts and a decline in passenger numbers.

== Design of the passenger terminal ==
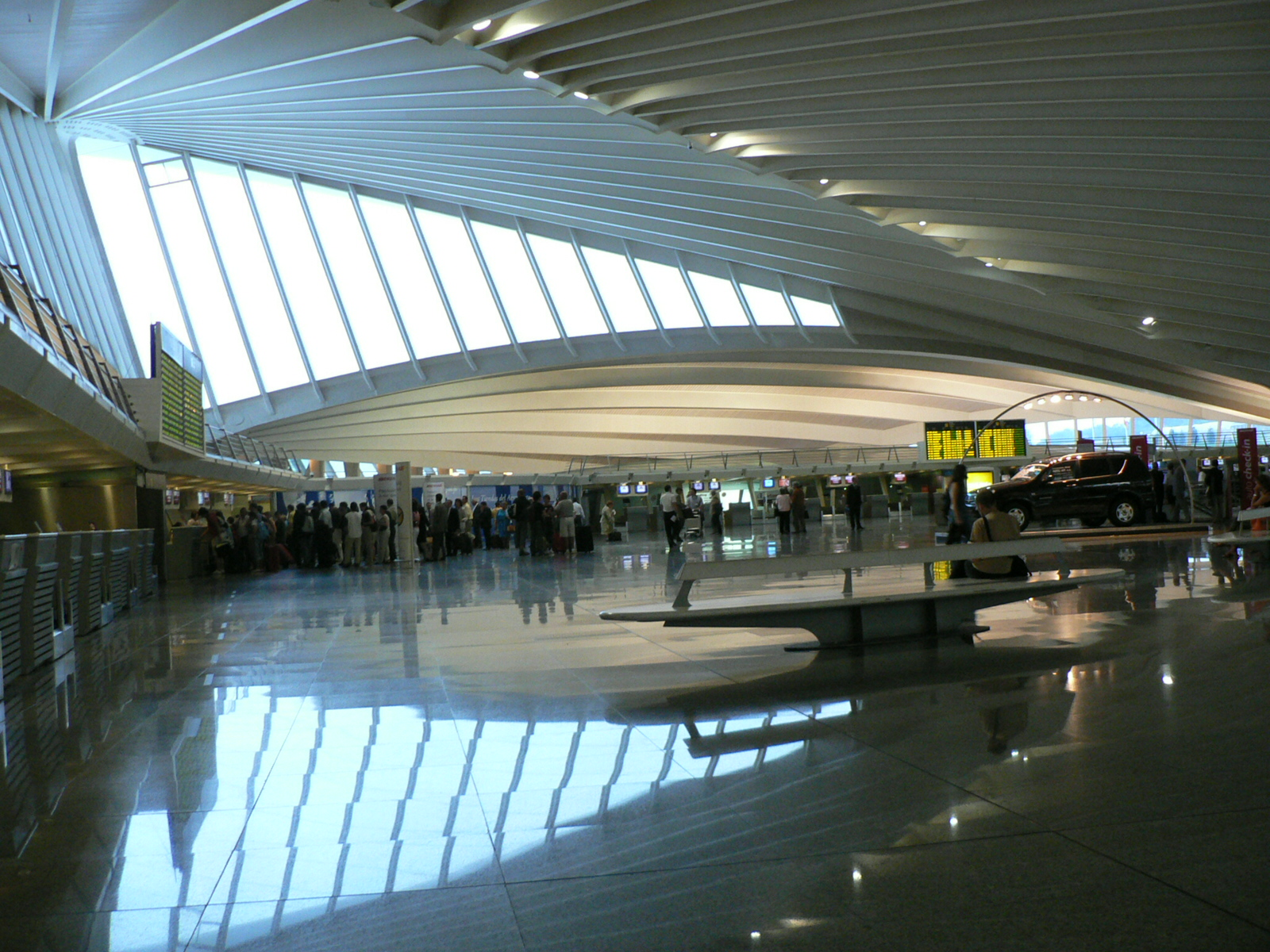
Bilbao Airport interior

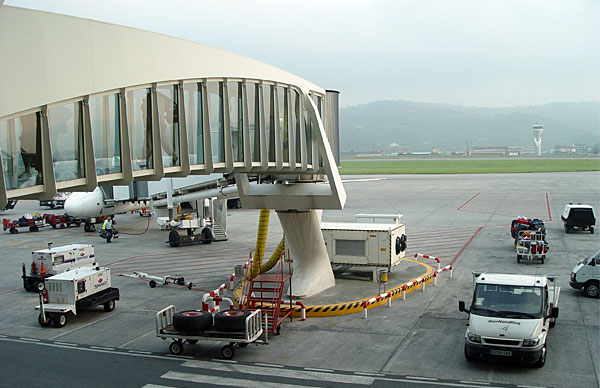
Bilbao Airport jetway

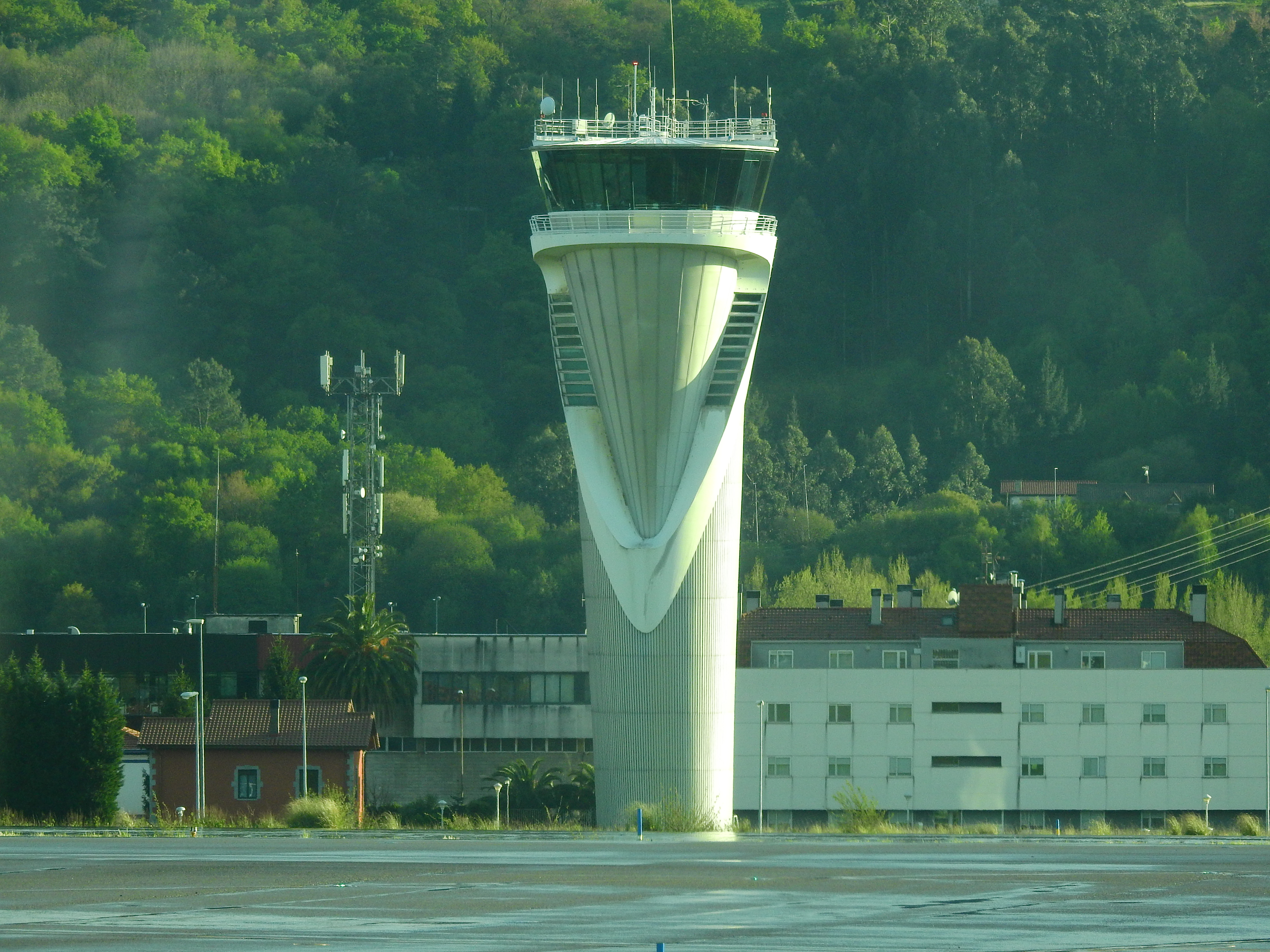
Control tower

The terminal has a sleek design, with two symmetrical "wings" and a sharp tip at its center which is especially visible when approaching the terminal from the sides. This original design has granted the building the nickname of La Paloma ("The Dove").

Users of the airport widely complained about its lack of an arrivals area, since once passengers cleared customs, they stepped directly outside, and there they were often exposed to the elements. The airport built a glass-walled shelter to remedy this problem.

== Traffic ==
With the past increase of traffic, the terminal would have become saturated again in a year because it is designed to handle about 4.5 million passengers per year. In 2007, it nearly reached its maximum capacity. However, the Great Recession reversed the situation by early 2009, decreasing the number of passengers by 24% in January compared to the previous year. In 2014, traffic was on the rise again, and the airport saw the recovery of passengers up to 5.4 million passengers by 2018.

== Airlines and destinations ==
The following airlines operate regular scheduled and charter flights at Bilbao Airport:

Airlines	Destinations
Aegean Airlines	Seasonal: Athens
Aer Lingus	Dublin; Seasonal: Cork
Air Arabia	Tangier
Air Cairo	Hurghada, Luxor
Air Europa	Lanzarote, Madrid, Palma de Mallorca, Tenerife–North
Air France	Paris–Charles de Gaulle
Austrian Airlines	Seasonal: Vienna
Brussels Airlines	Brussels
Cabo Verde Airlines	Seasonal: Sal
easyJet	Basel/Mulhouse, Bristol, Geneva, Manchester, Milan–Malpensa
Edelweiss Air	Zurich
Eurowings	Berlin, Düsseldorf, Stuttgart; Seasonal: Hamburg
Iberia	Madrid; Seasonal: Strasbourg (begins 1 December 2026); Seasonal charter: Menorca, Palma de Mallorca
Iberojet	Seasonal charter: Sal
KLM	Amsterdam
Lufthansa	Frankfurt, Munich
Luxair	Seasonal: Luxembourg
Norwegian Air Shuttle	Seasonal: Copenhagen, Oslo, Stockholm–Arlanda
Pegasus Airlines	Istanbul-Sabiha Gökçen
Royal Air Maroc	Casablanca
Scandinavian Airlines	Seasonal: Copenhagen
Smartwings	Prague
TAP Air Portugal	Lisbon
Transavia	Seasonal: Eindhoven
Turkish Airlines	Istanbul
United Airlines	Seasonal: Newark
Volotea	Alicante, Florence, Gran Canaria, Málaga, Porto, Rome–Fiumicino, Seville, Tenerife–South, Valencia, Venice; Seasonal: Athens, Castellón, Marrakesh, Murcia, Naples, Olbia, Palermo, Palma de Mallorca, Verona
Vueling	Alicante, Barcelona, Brussels, Edinburgh, Fuerteventura, Granada, Gran Canaria, Ibiza, Lanzarote, Lisbon, London–Gatwick, London–Heathrow, Málaga, Marrakesh, Milan–Malpensa, Naples (begins 4 December 2026), Palma de Mallorca, Paris–Orly, Porto, Prague, Rome–Fiumicino, Seville, Tenerife–North, Turin (begins 25 October 2026), Valencia, Venice (begins 25 October 2026); Seasonal: Amsterdam, Faro, Jerez de la Frontera, Menorca, Santiago de Compostela, Split
Wizz Air	Budapest Kraków, London–Luton, Málaga (begins 14 December 2026), Naples (begins 14 December 2026), Rome–Fiumicino, Santiago de Compostela (begins 2 November 2026), Turin, Valencia (begins 14 December 2026), Venice, Warsaw–Chopin, Wrocław (begins 2 December 2026)

== Statistics ==
	Passengers	Change from previous year	Aircraft movements	Change from previous year	Cargo (tonnes)	Change from previous year
2000	2,556,373	Steady	45,506	Steady	4,038	Steady
2001	2,491,770	▼2.5%	44,166	▼3%	3,674	▼9,1%
2002	2,463,698	▼1.1%	39,832	▼9.9%	3,699	▲0.6%
2003	2,850,524	▲15.7%	44,009	▲10.4%	3,813	▲3.1%
2004	3.395,773	▲19.1%	50,361	▲14.4%	4,152	▲8.9%
2005	3,843,953	▲13.2%	56,285	▲11.8%	3,956	▼4.7%
2006	3,876,072	▲0.8%	58,574	▲4.1%	3,417	▼13.6%
2007	4,286,751	▲10.6%	63,076	▲7.7%	3,230	▼5.5%
2008	4,172,903	▼2.7%	61,682	▼2.2%	3,178	▼1.1%
2009	3,654,957	▼12.4%	54,148	▼12.2%	2,691	▼15.3%
2010	3,888,969	▲6.4%	54,119	▼0.1	2,547	▼5.4%
2011	4,045,613	▲4.0%	54,432	▲0.6%	2,633	▲3.4%
2012	4,171,092	▲3.1%	50,030	▼8.1%	2,663	▲1.1%
2013	3,800,789	▼8.9%	42,683	▼14.7%	2,536	▼4.8%
2014	4,015,352	▲5.6%	42,590	▼0.2%	2,855	▲12.6%
2015	4,277,430	▲6.5%	43,862	▲3%	2,872	▲0.6%
2016	4,588,265	▲7.3%	45,105	▲2.8%	2,974	▲3.6%
2017	4,973,712	▲8.4%	46,989	▲4.2%	1,956	▼34.2%
2018	5,469,453	▲10%	49,966	▲6.3%	1,216	▼37.8%
Source: Aena Statistics

=== Top carriers ===
Rank	Carrier	Passengers 2025	%	Passenger % change 2025
1	Vueling	3,311,685	46.8%	▼0.004%
2	Volotea	608,427	8.6%	▼3.29%
3	Lufthansa	590,231	8.3%	▲7.14%
4	Air Europa	529,084	7.5%	▼0.33%
5	Iberia	409,473	5.7%	▲4.09%
6	KLM	235,242	3.3%	▲6.82%
7	Easyjet	191,252	2.7%	▲8.45%
8	Wizzair	148,941	2.1%	▲118.78%
9	Air France	144,785	2.0%	▲14.95%
10	Eurowings	136,634	1.9%	▲32.63%
11	Air Nostrum	107,669	1.5%	▼16.35%
12	Aer Lingus	101,262	1.4%	▲30.91%
13	Turkish Airlines	94,248	1.3%	▲19.47%
14	Brussels Airlines	91,132	1.2%	▲9.22%
15	TAP Air Portugal	60,297	0.8%	▲7.64%
Source: Aena Statistics

=== Busiest routes ===
Busiest European routes from BIO (2025)
Rank	Destination	Passengers	Change 2024/25
1	London-Gatwick	340,730	▼17.4%
2	Amsterdam	304,365	▲5.8%
3	Munich	295,806	▲4.1%
4	Frankfurt	294,614	▲10.4%
5	Paris-Charles de Gaulle	145,574	▼35.5%
6	Brussels	124,512	▲2.0%
7	Paris-Orly	122,482	▲255.9%
8	Rome-Fiumicino	106,482	▲146.4%
9	Lisbon	106,012	▲1.8%
10	Milan-Malpensa	105,868	▲39.6%
11	Istanbul	94,687	▲19.6%
12	London-Heathrow	86,562	new route
13	Dublin Airport	81.554	▲5.4%
14	Düsseldorf	79,889	▲17.7%
15	Porto	78,419	▼3.4%
16	Manchester	68,120	▲16.4%
17	Zurich	39,598	▼14.0%
18	Athens	39,439	▼8.9%
19	Prague	37,646	▲49.4%
20	Vienna	37,531	▼14.9%
Source: Estadísticas de tráfico aereo

Busiest intercontinental routes from BIO (2025)
Rank	Destination	Passengers	Change 2024/25
1	Marrakesh	40,168	▼4.1%
2	Tangier	29,135	▲28.8%
3	New York-Newark	15,071	new route
4	Luxor	6,115	▲160.3%
5	Cairo	5,633	▲137.9%
6	Istanbul-Sabiha Gökçen	4,789	new route
7	Sal	4,329	▲13.3%
8	Tinduf	545	▲84.7%
9	Algiers	530	▼25.5%
10	Jeddah	403	new route
Source: Estadísticas de tráfico aereo

Busiest domestic routes from BIO (2025)
Rank	Destination	Passengers	Change 2024/25
1	Madrid	830,231	▲2.5%
2	Barcelona	686,705	▼1.1%
3	Málaga	354,688	▲1.0%
4	Seville	354,086	▲0.2%
5	Palma de Mallorca	312,857	▲0.03%
6	Tenerife-North	242,411	▲11.4%
7	Valencia	204,666	▲1.9%
8	Gran Canaria	203,717	▲9.6%
9	Alicante	177,407	▼11.7%
10	Lanzarote	125.176	▼0.05%
11	Menorca	93,063	▼15.8%
12	Ibiza	92,059	▼16.2%
13	Santiago de Compostela	63,639	▼19.5%
14	Fuerteventura	59,999	▲33,4%
15	Tenerife-South	35,252	▼0.6%
16	Granada	28,852	▼8.8%
17	Murcia	12,538	▲13.1%
18	Castellón	10,101	▼3.3%
19	Jerez de la Frontera	7,812	▲1.3%
20	Almería	4,437	▼75.6%
Source: Estadísticas de tráfico aereo

== Public transport ==
=== Bus ===
- BizkaiBus:
  - A bus line (A3247) connects Bilbao city center (Plaza Elíptica) and the city bus station with the airport. Buses depart every 12 minutes during July and August, and every 15 minutes the rest of the year. The bus reaches the city center in 15 minutes.
  - A bus line (A2153) connects Bilbao city center (San Jose square) with Larrabetzu stopping at the airport. Buses depart every hour.
  - Starting in 2029, bus line (A3248) will connect Ansio metro station in Barakaldo with the airport via the Rontegi bridge. Buses will depart every 30 minutes.
- Lurraldebus:
  - DO04 bus line operated by Lurraldebus to Donostia-San Sebastián; its only stop is at Zarautz - adjacent to one of the town's two Euskotren stations (at the eastern end of the town). Buses depart every hour October to June, and every 30 minutes from the end of June to the end of September.
  - DG12 bus line operated by Lurraldebus to Mondragón with stops in Eibar and Bergara; the last daily service continues until Oñati. There are 6 buses departing from Bergara every day, and a single bus from Oñati.
- Autobuses La Unión:
  - Line A3720 connects Vitoria-Gasteiz city center with Bilbao airport, buses depart every 2 hours in the winter months, and every hour in the busier months, stopping at Vitoria bus station, Vitoria Airport and Bolueta metro station in Bilbao.

=== Metro extension ===
There is a project to extend the Bilbao Metro's Line 3 to the airport in the near future, but there is no official timetable yet.

== Accidents and incidents ==
- On 15 September 1975 British Airways flight NS552 operated by Trident 1E G-AVYD was written off at Bilbao while taking off. The aircraft came off the runway following the commander's decision to abort the take-off on a wet runway at or close to V1.
- On 7 February 2001, Iberia Flight IB1456 arriving from Barcelona encountered wind shear while landing and suffered collapsed landing gear. All people on board survived but 25 people were injured.

== See also ==
- List of airports in Spain
