= List of defunct airlines of Morocco =

This is a list of defunct airlines of Morocco.

Airline	Image	IATA	ICAO	Callsign	Commenced operations	Ceased operations	Notes
Aerial Photos					1986	1997	Operated Cessna 206
Aigle-Azur Maroc					1954	1954	Merged into Royal Air Maroc
Air Atlas					1946	1953	Merged with Air Maroc to form CCTA
Air Atlas Express			AXP	ATLAS EXPRESS	2002	2004	
Air Maroc					1947	1953	Merged with Air Atlas to form CCTA. Operated Sud-Ouest Bretagne, Curiss C-46
Air Sud					1990s	1990s	Operated BN-2 Islander, Cessna 402, Piper Seneca
Atlas Blue		8A	BMM	ATLASBLUE	2004	2011	Merged into Royal Air Maroc
Jet4you		8J	JFU	ARGAN	2005	2012	
Med-Airlines					2010	2012	
Mondair			MMA	MONDAIR	2002	2004	
Regional AirLines		FN	RGL	MAROC REGIONAL	1996	2009	Rebranded as Air Arabia Maroc
Royal Air Inter		RN	RAI		1970	1990	
Société Commerciale d’Aviation Nord Africaine					1955	1966	Operated Douglas C-47
Tingair		TI	TIG	TINGAIR	2008	2008	Not launched

== See also ==
- List of airlines of Morocco
- List of airports in Morocco
