= List of airlines of Morocco =

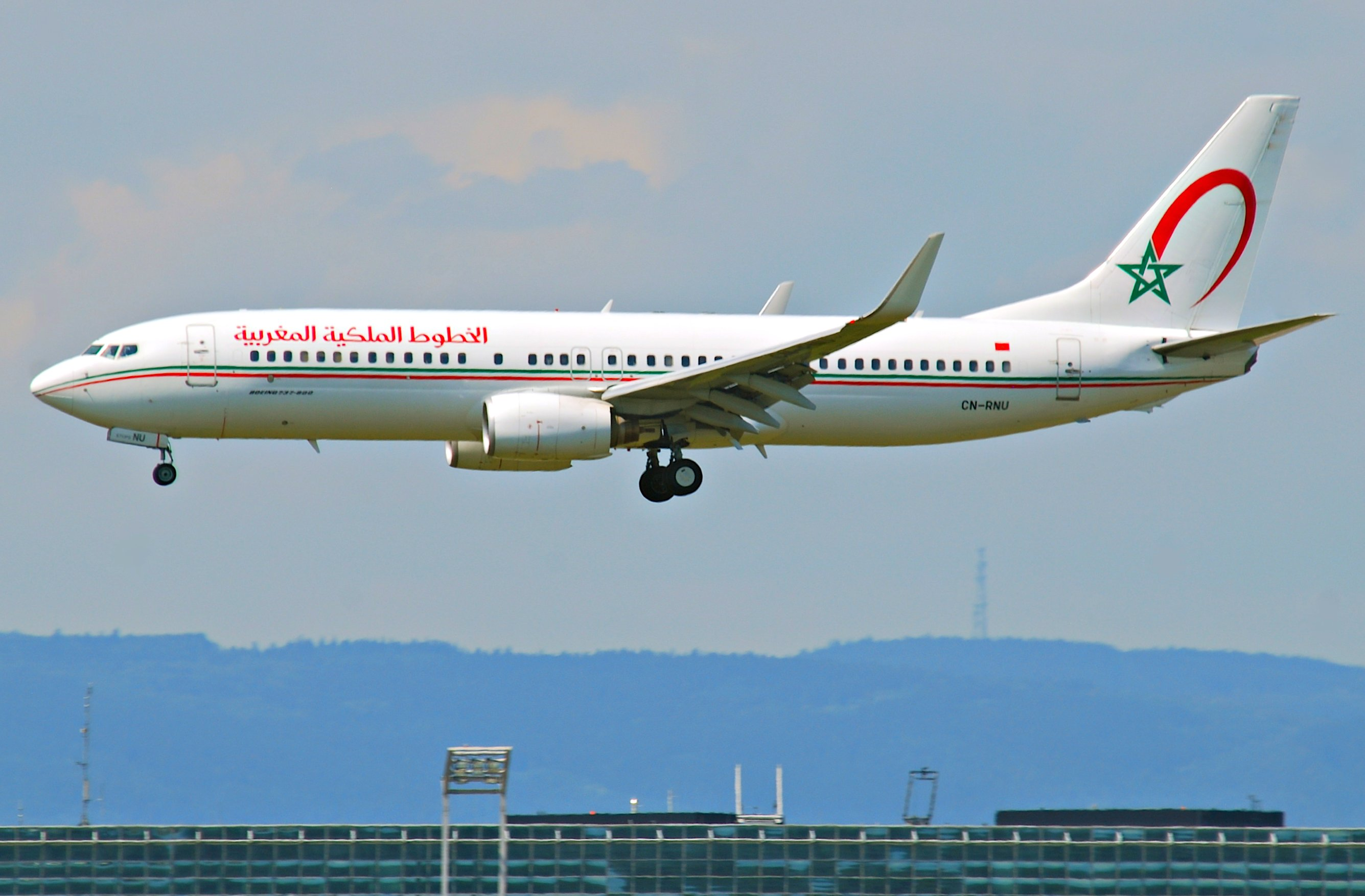
A Boeing 737-800 of Royal Air Maroc, Morocco's flag carrier

This is a list of airlines currently operating in Morocco.

Airline	Image	IATA	ICAO	Callsign	Commenced operations	Notes
AIR OCEAN MAROC			AOM	AOM	2014	
Air Arabia Maroc		3O	MAC	ARABIA MAROC	2009	
Casa Air Service					1995	
Dalia Air			DLI		2010	Private airline
Med Airlines						
RAM Cargo					2010	
Royal Air Maroc Express		FN	RXP	EXPRESS MAROC	1996	
Royal Air Maroc		AT	RAM	ROYALAIR MAROC	1957	

== See also ==
- List of defunct airlines of Morocco
- List of airlines
