= Nador International Airport =

Airport for Nador province, Morocco

Nador International Airport مطار الناظور العروي (Arabic)
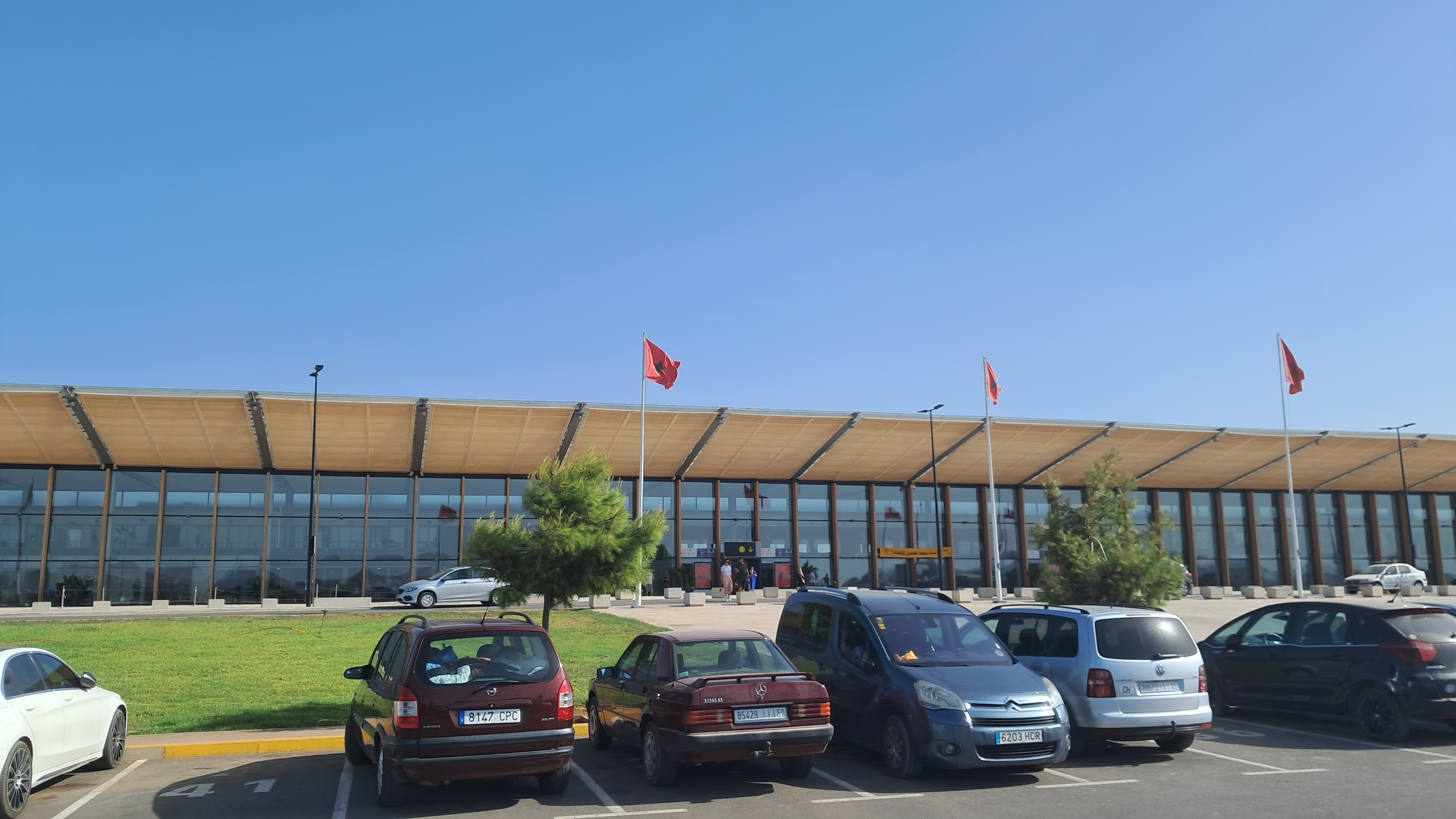
- IATA: NDR; ICAO: GMMW

Summary
- Airport type: Public
- Operator: Airports of Morocco
- Serves: Nador, Morocco
- Elevation AMSL: 574 ft (175 m)
- Coordinates: 34°59′20″N 003°01′42″W
- Website: airportnador.com

Map
- Location of the Airport in Morocco

Runways
Direction	Length		Surface
Direction	m	ft	Surface
08/26	3,000	9,843	Asphalt

Statistics (2024)
- Passengers: 1,053,745
- Passenger change 23-24: ▲3.9%
- Source: DAFIF

Nador International Airport (Berber languages: ⴰⵣⴰⴳⵯⵣ ⵏⵏⴰⴹⵓⵕ-ⵍⵄⵔⵡⵉ; Arabic: مطار الناظور العروي), (IATA: NDR, ICAO: GMMW), is an international airport serving Nador, a city in the Oriental region in Morocco. It is also known as Arwi Airport.

== Location ==
The original location at Taouima moved to El Aroui, some 14 miles (24 km) south-southwest of Nador city. The airport lies nearly directly along the N2 national road. There is no public transport to the airport. Directly in front of the terminal there is a large (paid) parking-place which is mainly used for people bringing or picking up passengers.

Also outside the terminal there are many Grand Taxis offering shared connections with most major destinations for people flying to Nador. The taxis are also often offered for private-hire: thus where there is only one (group of) passenger(s). Petit Taxis are available to come or go to the town of Al Aroui only.

== Overview ==
An initial airport was created in 1931 in the village of Tawima (south of Nador town) and was the primary airport for Melilla, since 1947 a Spanish enclave to the north. Following the independence of Morocco, Melilla began steps in creating an airport within Spanish control. In 1969 Melilla Airport opened to provide air travel between the Spanish enclave and mainland Spain.

Nador is a small international airport (Inaugurated in 1999) with links to Morocco's main airports and some European destinations such as Germany, the Netherlands, Belgium and Spain. In the summer season it becomes a very busy airport when many Moroccan nationals living in Western Europe and originating from the Rif region (Riffian people) travel through it. The Nador airport is owned and run by the state company ONDA. The main user is Royal Air Maroc but also low-cost carriers like Ryanair, Airarabia, Tuifly, Transavia fly to Nador.

The airport expanded in 2001 and added a 5600-square-meter passenger terminal, a transformer station, a power station, and other stations and service buildings.

Although most flights are operated using the smaller Boeing 737 or similar, in the summer months the demand for seats is so high that Royal Air Maroc operated weekly flights from Amsterdam Schiphol and Brussels using their Boeing 747; however, in 2012, these flights were replaced by "normal" Boeing 737 flights. The runway and stand are designed to handle jumbos but the facilities like passport control get overwhelmed when a full B-747 arrives.

Following the high number of travelers and flights, an extension Terminal work began in 2016. The old airport was demolished to rebuild the new airport which was inaugurated on July 9, 2021.

In 2009, the airport handled over 307,000 passengers.

== Facilities ==
Nador International Airport has a single terminal, divided into arrivals and departures, both on the ground floor. Check-in terminals are located at one side of the main terminal hall, while the other side is for baggage retrieval for arriving customers.

The airport has one runway, approximately 3,000 metres long and 45 metres wide. It can handle commercial aircraft up to a Boeing 747. Total aircraft parking space is 54,000 m^{2}, enough for two Boeing 747s or four Boeing 737s. The airport has an ILS Class 1 certification and offers the following radionavigational aids: VOR – DME – NDB. PAPI lighting is available when landing on Runway 28.

== Airlines and destinations ==
The following airlines operate regular scheduled and charter flights at Nador Airport:

Airlines	Destinations
Air Arabia	Amsterdam, Barcelona, Brussels, Cologne/Bonn, Hahn, Montpellier, Murcia, Palma de Mallorca, Rabat, Strasbourg, Tangier
Air Horizont	Seasonal charter: Porto
Azores Airlines	Seasonal charter: Lisbon
Brussels Airlines	Seasonal: Brussels
Corendon Airlines	Seasonal: Cologne/Bonn, Düsseldorf; Seasonal charter: Rotterdam/The Hague
Eurowings	Seasonal: Cologne/Bonn, Düsseldorf
Iberia	Seasonal: Alicante, Madrid, Málaga, Palma de Mallorca
Royal Air Maroc	Amsterdam^{a}, Brussels^{b}, Casablanca, Tangier; Seasonal: Barcelona (resumes 10 September 2026), Düsseldorf, Frankfurt, Madrid, Rotterdam/The Hague
Ryanair	Barcelona, Beauvais, Charleroi, Hahn, Madrid, Marseille, Weeze; Seasonal: Málaga, Toulouse
Smartwings	Seasonal charter: Prague
Transavia	Paris–Orly, Rotterdam/The Hague
TUI fly Belgium	Brussels, Eindhoven, Rotterdam/The Hague; Seasonal: Antwerp
Vueling	Barcelona

^a This flight operates between Tangier and Amsterdam via Nador. However, this carrier does not sell tickets solely between Nador and Tangier.
^b This flight operates between Tangier and Brussels via Nador. However, this carrier does not sell tickets solely between Nador and Tangier.

== Ground transport ==
The airport is located at Al Arouit and approximately 25 km. from Nador city by road. Other than taxis, no public transport is available. On arrival, meeting incoming flights many grand taxis and petit taxis wait outside the terminal and offer transfers to most regional cities. A paid car-park area is directly outside the terminal, mainly used to bring passengers or pick up arriving passengers. The roads between the airport and Nador city are in good condition and signposted in Arabic and French. The airport lies directly along the main national route N2 (from Tangier to Oujda). From the airport the route to the city uses this N2 in an easterly direction to the north outdoor route N15 to the city.

Since June 23, 2023, a new bus line serves the International airport of Al Aroui to the city of Nador every hour from 08:00 am to 10:00 pm

AIRBUS Line Number: 23 (near the Terminal arrivals terminal)

== Traffic statistics ==
Like other Moroccan airports, the traffic is very seasonal. All through the year, Royal Air Maroc (in codeshare with Atlas Blue) flies several times per week to Brussels and Amsterdam, but in the summer season more flights are scheduled. In the peak season, RAM even uses their Boeing 747 jumbojet every week on the route to/from Amsterdam and Brussels instead of the smaller Boeing 737 as they do the rest of the year.

Traffic statistic
2001
83.109
+8.39%
2002
82.010
-1.32%
2003
81.604
-0.50%
2004
89.287
+9.41%
2005
94.380
+5.70%
2006
110.589
+17.17%
2007
171.239
+54.84%
2008
215.045
+25.58%
2009
307.483
+42.99%
2010
442.508
+43.30%
2011
572.388
+29.45%
2012
602.426
+5.25%
2013
611.888
+1.57%
2014
604.013
-1.29%
2015
602.764
-0.21%
2016
640.122
+6.20%
2017
705.276
+10.18 %
2018
710.559
+0.51%
2019
772.371
+8.68%
2020
276.157
-64.28%
2021
579.417
+109.78%
2022
836.742
+108.18%
2023
1.025.652
+22%

Nearly a third of the annual traffic is handled by the airport during the summer months. Because Nador and surroundings aren't (yet) a tourist destination such as Agadir or Marrakesh, nearly all passengers are Moroccan nationals (incl. 2nd and 3rd generation) visiting relatives.

Recent statistics

Item	2010	Change %	2009	Change %	2008	change %	2007	2006	2005	2004	2003	2002
Passengers	442,508	+43.30%	308,789	+ 44.94%	213,045	+ 25.50%	171,293	110,589	94,380	89,287	81,604	82,010
Movements	n/a	n/a	4020	+102.72%	1983	+ 7.89%	1838	1614	1634	1368	1001	1009
Cargo (Metric tons)	n/a	n/a	3.98	28.80%	5.59	63.58%	15.35	92.33	22.04	74.36	17.27	20.30
