= Ababu =

Ababu is both a given name and a surname. Notable people with the name include:

- Josephat Ababu (born 1980), Kenyan cricketer
- Ababu Namwamba (born 1975), Kenyan politician and lawyer

== See also ==
- Ababou
- Ababuj
