= SOMED =

SOMED (French: Société Maroco-Emiratie de Développement) is a conglomerate company based in Morocco. It is active in a range of sectors such as mining, construction material dealership, tourism, real estate development, food processing and car dealership. Its capital is composed of King Mohammed VI's holding company Al Mada, Emirati private funds and the Moroccan state.

== Ownership ==
In February 2008, the SNI (now Al Mada) entered in the capital of the company, buying an equivalent of 1.24 billion Dirhams of shares. The partition then became:

- 32.9% Al Mada
- 33.9% Private Emirati funds
- 33.25% Trésor Marocain (Moroccan state)

Former Morocco's Minister of the Interior, Mostapha Sahel was the CEO of the firm.

== Activities ==
The SOMED developed the Mazagan Beach Resort, Casino, Golf and Spa which it sold to the state-owned institution CDG in 2010 for an undisclosed amount.

== Subsidiaries ==
The companies official websites mentions the following subsidiaries:

- Hotels
  - Sheraton Casablanca
  - Hôtel Pullman Marrakech Resort and Spa
  - Atlas Almohades Casablanca
  - Atlas Almohades Agadir
  - Atlas Almohades Tanger
  - Hôtel Barcelo Fès
  - Hôtel Wahate Aguedal Marrakech
  - Hôtel Atlas Hospitality Morocco Rabat
- Real-estate
  - SOMED Développement
- Diversified
  - Zellidja (Rebab company); subsidiaries:
    - Al Ain, Fénie Brossette, SFP Zellidja, Atlantis, Africa Palace Maroc, Rebab Company, Delma (owner of Sheraton Casablanca), Daewoo Rabat (owner of Hilton Rabat)
- Food Processing and fishing
  - SOPROLIVES
  - UMEP
  - OLICO
- Construction, distribution and Industry
  - SFP Zellidja (Société des Fonderies de Plomb de Zellidja)
  - Fénie Brossette (Fénie Brossette)
  - Société de Développement Automobile (Exclusive distributor of Maserati in Morocco)
- Education
  - Université Internationale de Casablanca (Laureate SOMED Education Holding)

== See also ==
- Les Domaines Agricoles
- Attijariwafa Bank
- SONASID
