= Ababou =

Ababou is a surname common in Morocco.

Notable people with the name include:

- Dylan Ababou (born 1986), Filipino basketball player
- M'hamed Ababou (1938–1971), Moroccan colonel and the instigator of the 1971 failed coup
- Mohamed Ababou (1934–1976), Moroccan military commander who co-organized the 1971 failed coup
- Hassan Ababou, CEO of Caisse de dépôt et de gestion from 1968 to 1970
