= Lycée français Léon l'Africain =

French school in Morocco

Coordinates: 33.593°N 7.656°W

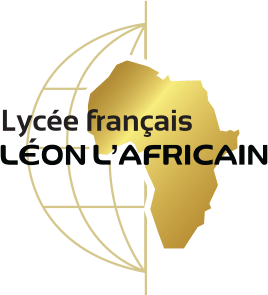

Location
- 416 Boulevard Bourgogne

Information
- School type: French school abroad
- Affiliation: AEFE

The Lycée français Léon l'Africain is a French school in Morocco. It is a partner institution of the Agency for French Education Abroad (AEFE). It has 3 campuses in Casablanca and Rabat. It serves kindergarten through high school.

== Campuses ==
=== Casablanca Val d'Anfa ===
This was the first campus created. This campus contains multiple buildings scattered around the Val d'Anfa neighborhood, in the Anfa arrondissement. The kindergarten is found on Rue Ibn Hamdisse. Elementary school is found on Rue Oum Kalthoum. Grades 6 and 7 are at the school on Avenue Ahmed Charci (a laboratory annex can also be found on that street). The main building, which offers the remaining grades of middle school and high school, is located at 416 Boulevard Bourgogne.

=== Domaine d'Anfa ===
Located in the new Domaine d'Anfa development west of Casablanca, this campus welcomes students from all levels, kindergarten to high school.

=== Rabat Souissi ===
Located in the Souissi district of the capital, this campus serves all levels from kindergarten to high school.

== Ownership ==
The Lycée Français Léon l’Africain is owned by the Groupe Elbilia, which itself is owned by Education Development Company, a private education group. This company is a subsidiary of the Moroccan-Emirati Development Company (SOMED), which is jointly owned by private Emirati funds, the Moroccan state, and the royal holding Al Mada.

The Groupe Elbilia was originally owned by Mustapha Rabie Andaloussi. In 2019, despite his denial of the information, SOMED acquired 100% of the group’s capital for a sum of 90 million euros.
