= EBM =

EBM or Ebm may stand for:

== Science and technology ==
- Electron-beam machining, a process
- Electron-beam melting, a type of additive manufacturing
- Electronic ballot marker, a type of voting machine
- Espresso Book Machine, a print-on-demand machine
- Evidence-based medicine, an approach to medical research and practice
- Energy-based model, a machine learning model

== Companies and organizations ==
- Elektra Birseck Münchenstein, a Swiss energy company
- English Biscuit Manufacturers, a Pakistani biscuit manufacturer
- Ekobrottsmyndigheten, the Swedish Economic Crime Authority
- Écoles Belges au Maroc, Belgian international school network in Morocco

== Music ==
- Electronic body music, an electronic music genre
- E-flat minor (E♭m)
- EBM (album), a 2022 album by British indie rock band Editors

== Other uses ==
- Ecosystem-based management, an environmental management approach
- El Borma Airport (IATA code), Tunisia
