= Compagnie Générale Immobiliere =

Moroccan real-estate development company

Compagnie générale immobilière
- Type: Société anonyme
- Industry: Real estate
- Founded: 1960; 66 years ago
- Headquarters: Rabat, Morocco
- Key people: Adil Chennouf
- Revenue: 2.53 billion dirhams (2021)
- Parent: CDG Développement
- Website: www.cgi.ma

Compagnie générale immobilière (CGI) is a Moroccan real estate company based in Rabat. It is a subsidiary of CDG Développement, itself part of the Caisse de dépôt et de gestion (CDG).

Founded in 1960, CGI was among the first subsidiaries created within the CDG group. The company was listed on the Casablanca Stock Exchange from 2007 until its delisting in 2015.

CGI is active in several real estate sectors in Morocco, including housing, tourism-related real estate, business and commercial developments, and public or semi-public facilities such as universities.

== History ==
=== Foundation ===
Compagnie générale immobilière was founded in 1960, four years after the independence of Morocco. It was one of the first subsidiaries of the Caisse de dépôt et de gestion, a public financial institution established in 1959.

CGI was originally set up within the CDG group and later became part of CDG Développement.

=== Development ===
During the following decades, CGI took part in the development of housing programmes in several Moroccan urban areas. By the end of 1979, the company had completed 4,694 housing units, mainly intended for civil servants and employees of the semi-public sector.

Between 1980 and 1990, CGI brought more than 21,000 housing units to the market, intended for approximately 100,000 residents. A large share of these developments consisted of economic housing.

The company was also associated with the Darlamane project in Casablanca, a housing development of around 4,000 units that received recognition from the Aga Khan Award for Architecture.

In the mid-1990s, CGI developed several real estate projects, including Al Boustane and Mimosa in Rabat, Arsat Sala in Salé and Al Hadika in Casablanca. The company later introduced a quality-management programme known as “Miftah”, linked to the adoption of ISO 9001 certification.

CGI subsequently moved towards larger urban projects, including Casablanca Marina and Casa Green Town. It also obtained ISO 9001 certification under the 2008 version of the standard.

=== Stock exchange listing ===
In 2004, CGI became a subsidiary of CDG Développement, which held 99.9% of its capital.

In 2006, the company's headquarters were moved from the Hassan district to Hay Riad in Rabat.

In May 2007, CGI adopted a governance structure consisting of a management board and a supervisory board. In July 2007, the company received approval from the Commission déontologique des valeurs mobilières for the listing of approximately 20% of its capital on the Casablanca Stock Exchange.

=== CDG-CGI affair and delisting ===
In October 2014, the CDG-CGI affair emerged amid criticism of certain real estate projects and of governance within the group. Following the affair, Ali Ghannam, director general of CGI, and Anas Houir Alami, director general of CDG, were removed from their positions.

The same month, CGI announced its intention to withdraw from the stock exchange. Minister of Finance Mohamed Boussaïd stated that the affair would affect CGI's share price and indicated that the company's new orientation would place greater emphasis on its public-service role rather than on commercial objectives. CGI was effectively delisted in 2015.

== Activities ==
CGI operates in several segments of the real estate sector, including residential development, business real estate, tourism-related real estate, community facilities and serviced land subdivisions.

In residential real estate, the company develops middle- and high-end housing programmes, including villas, apartments and secured residential complexes. It is also active in social and economic housing, mainly through its subsidiary Dyar Al Mansour.

In business real estate, CGI has been involved in the development of business centres, shopping centres, administrative complexes, corporate headquarters and offshoring spaces. Its activities also include tourism-related projects, such as hotels, resorts and integrated tourist complexes.

The company has also developed community facilities, including hospital, sports, university and religious facilities. It also markets serviced land plots ready for construction.

Its activities involve professions related to project design, construction, marketing and property management, including engineering, architecture, real estate management and brand communication.

== Selected projects ==
=== Tourism and urban development ===
CGI has been involved in several tourism and urban-development projects. These include:

- Nador: Rif Hotel and the Abdouna Trifa resort
- Marrakesh: resort development
- Casablanca: Casablanca Marina and two marina hotels
- Fnideq: Karabo hotel
- Al Hoceima: Hôtel Mohamed V and Quemado Resort

=== Commercial real estate ===
CGI has also participated in commercial and mixed-use developments, including:

- Rabat: L'Agdal and Ryad Center multifunctional developments
- Casablanca: shopping-centre developments

=== Public and community facilities ===
CGI has been involved in public and community projects, including:

- Salé: Mohammed VI Football Academy
- Rabat: sports centre
- Oujda: hospital campus
- University centres in Casablanca, Oujda, Taroudant and Ouarzazate

== Subsidiaries ==
CGI's subsidiaries include:

- Dyar Al Mansour
- Al Manar Company Development
- CGI Management
- Immolog

== Management ==
Former directors of CGI include:

- Mohamed Ouanaya
- Mohamed Ali Ghannam
- Mohamed M’barki
