= Caisse de Dépôt et de Gestion =

Moroccan state-owned financial institution

Caisse de dépôt et de gestion صندوق الإيداع و التدبير

- Type: Investment fund
- Industry: Pension fund
- Founded: 1959; 67 years ago
- Headquarters: Rabat, Morocco
- Key people: Khalid Safir (director)
- Website: www.cdg.ma

The Caisse de dépôt et de gestion (French pronunciation: [kɛs də depo e də ʒɛstjɔ̃], lit. 'Deposit and Management Fund', abbr. CDG) is a state-owned financial institution responsible for the collection, protection and investment of long-term savings in Morocco. It manages regulated funds and plays a significant role as an institutional investor in the national economy, notably in sectors such as real estate, tourism and infrastructure. The group operates through numerous subsidiaries active across various areas of the economy.

CDG notably administers pension and insurance funds, including the RCAR (Régime Collectif d'Allocations de Retraite) and the CNRA (Caisse Nationale de Retraites et d'Assurances), which pool retirement contributions from employees of state-owned enterprises and public institutions. Between 2005 and 2008, its assets under management increased significantly following the transfer of retirement funds from the OCP Group, one of the world's leading phosphate producers and exporters, to the RCAR system.

== History ==
The fund was established in 1959 as part of a broader state-led effort to develop public financial institutions and channel long-term savings into national development. According to its founding statute, CDG was entrusted with managing funds and safeguarding assets deposited by public bodies, receiving administrative and judicial consignments and guarantees, and administering special funds assigned to it.

During the 1960s, under its first director Mamoun Tahiri, the institution expanded beyond its initial custodial functions and became involved in tourism and real estate development, reflecting broader shifts in Moroccan economic policy.

By the early 2000s, CDG had become the largest non-bank financial institution in Morocco and remained a key instrument of government financial policy.

== Investments ==
CDG has invested through its subsidiaries and affiliated companies in a range of sectors regarded as strategic to the Moroccan economy, notably industry, tourism, urban development, and business parks. These activities are carried out mainly through entities such as Fipar-Holding, Madaëf, MEDZ, Ewane Assets, and the Société d'aménagement de Zenata.

=== Industry ===
==== Automotive and aeronautics ====
CDG has participated in major industrial projects through Fipar-Holding and MEDZ. In 2009, Fipar-Holding acquired a 47.6% stake in Renault Tanger Méditerranée, the company created for Renault's manufacturing project near Tangier. CDG later also supported the establishment of the PSA Peugeot Citroën automotive plant in Morocco through a planned equity participation by Fipar-Holding in the project company.

Through MEDZ, CDG has also developed industrial platforms linked to these sectors. Atlantic Free Zone in Kénitra was developed primarily for the automotive sector, while Midparc in Nouaceur was designed as an industrial platform serving the aeronautics industry.

=== Tourism ===
==== Tourism assets and destination development ====
CDG's tourism investments are grouped within Madaëf, the tourism branch of the CDG group. According to CDG and Madaëf, the group operates across the tourism value chain, including destination development, hotel asset management, and the management of sports and leisure facilities.

Madaëf's portfolio includes assets and projects in destinations such as Saïdia, Tamuda Bay, Taghazout Bay, Marrakesh, Rabat, Fès, and Al Hoceima. Its destination-development activities include resort, hotel, residential, and entertainment projects, while the Madaëf Eco6 programme, launched in 2020, was presented as a tool to support entrepreneurship and local ecosystems around major tourist destinations including Taghazout Bay, Saïdia Resorts, Tamuda Bay, Al Hoceima, and Fès.

==== Club Med and TUI ====
In 2006, CDG, through its subsidiary Fipar International, acquired approximately 10% of Club Med and 5% of TUI for an estimated MAD 3.7 billion. CDG also invested in the development and renovation of tourism assets linked to Club Med in Morocco. Between 2010 and 2013, it gradually reduced and ultimately exited its participation in Club Med.

=== Urban development ===
==== Zenata Eco-City ====
Among CDG's best-known urban projects is the Zenata Eco-City, located between Casablanca and Mohammedia. The project was delegated to CDG under a memorandum of understanding signed in 2006, and the group created the Société d'aménagement de Zenata (SAZ) to oversee its design and implementation.

According to the project's official website, Zenata is presented as an eco-city designed around neighbourhood centres, public transport, and green space. Its published characteristics include a 5.5 km seafront promenade, about 470 hectares of parks and planted areas, and a first residential district known as the Quartier de la ferme, covering 70 hectares.

=== Business parks and territorial development ===
==== MEDZ, Ewane Assets, and offshoring parks ====
Through MEDZ, CDG has developed and managed a network of industrial and offshoring parks in several Moroccan regions. MEDZ states that it was created in 2002 and later expanded its scope from tourism zones to industrial and offshore activity zones.

Projects identified by MEDZ as among its flagship developments include Casanearshore, Technopolis, Fès Shore, Oujda Shore, Atlantic Free Zone, Midparc, Agropolis, Parc Haliopolis, the Technopole d'Oujda, and the Jorf Lasfar industrial park. Within this branch, Ewane Assets is responsible for professional rental real estate and the design and development of buildings and infrastructure in parks such as Casanearshore, Technopolis, Fès Shore, and Oujda Shore.

In 2024, the European Investment Bank announced €115 million in financing for MEDZ to expand and modernise ten technology parks in five Moroccan regions, reflecting the continuing role of CDG's territorial-development branch in this area.

== Subsidiaries ==
As of November 2013, CDG’s subsidiaries were organised across several business lines, including pensions, finance, territorial development, and sectoral investments.

=== Pension and insurance management ===
- Régime Collectif d'Allocation de Retraite (RCAR)
- Caisse Nationale de Retraites et d'Assurances (CNRA)

=== Financial services and investment ===
==== Banking and asset management ====
- CDG Capital
- CDG Capital Bourse
- CDG Capital Gestion
- CDG Capital Private Equity
- CDG Capital Real Estate
- CDG Capital Infrastructures
- Maghreb Titrisation
- CIH Bank

==== Strategic investments ====
- Fipar-Holding

==== Insurance and financing ====
- Atlanta
- Société Centrale de Réassurance
- SOFAC

=== Territorial and real estate development ===
==== Urban development and land planning ====
- Agence d’Urbanisation et de Développement d’Anfa
- Société d’Aménagement de Zenata
- Sonadac
- Casa Développement
- Témara Développement

==== Real estate and tourism ====
- CGI
- CGI Management
- Foncière Chellah
- Dyar Al Mansour
- Dyar Al Madina
- Jnane Saïss Développement
- Société de Développement Saïdia (SDS)
- Société d’Aménagement et de Promotion de la Station de Taghazout (SAPST)
- Hotels & Resorts of Morocco (HRM)
- Golf Management Maroc (GMM)
- Royal Golf de Fès
- Al Manar Development Company

==== Business parks and infrastructure ====
- MEDZ
- MEDZ Industrial Parks
- MEDZ Sourcing
- Casanearshore
- Technopolis
- Parc Haliopolis
- Oued Fès
- New Marina Casablanca (NMC)

==== Engineering and services ====
- Novec
- Exprom Facilities
- Patrilog
- Noréa
- CG Park
- Rabat Parking
- Creative Technologies
- Nemotek Technologies
- Sothermy
- SFCDG

=== Funds and specialised vehicles ===
- FINEA
- Fonds Jaïda

=== Industry and natural resources ===
- Med Paper
- Fonds Eucaforest
- Cellulose du Maroc
- Avilmar

=== Other activities ===
- HP-CDG IT Services Maroc
- Loterie Nationale

== Past CEOs ==
- Mamoun Tahiri (October 1959 – June 1965)
- Ahmed Bennani (June 1965 – September 1966)
- Ahmed Benkirane (September 1966 – January 1968)
- Hassan Ababou (January 1968 – May 1970)
- Abdelkamel Reghaye (May 1970 – July 1974)
- M'fadel Lahlou (July 1974 – April 1995)
- Khalid el-Kadiri (April 1995 – August 2001)
- Mustapha Bakkoury (August 2001 – June 2009)
- Anas Houir Alami (June 2009 – August 2015)
- Abdelatif Zaghnoun (2015 – 2022)
- Khalid Safir (July 2022 – present)
