= Dar Bouazza =

Dar Bouazza دار بو عزة Tamaris
- Municipality
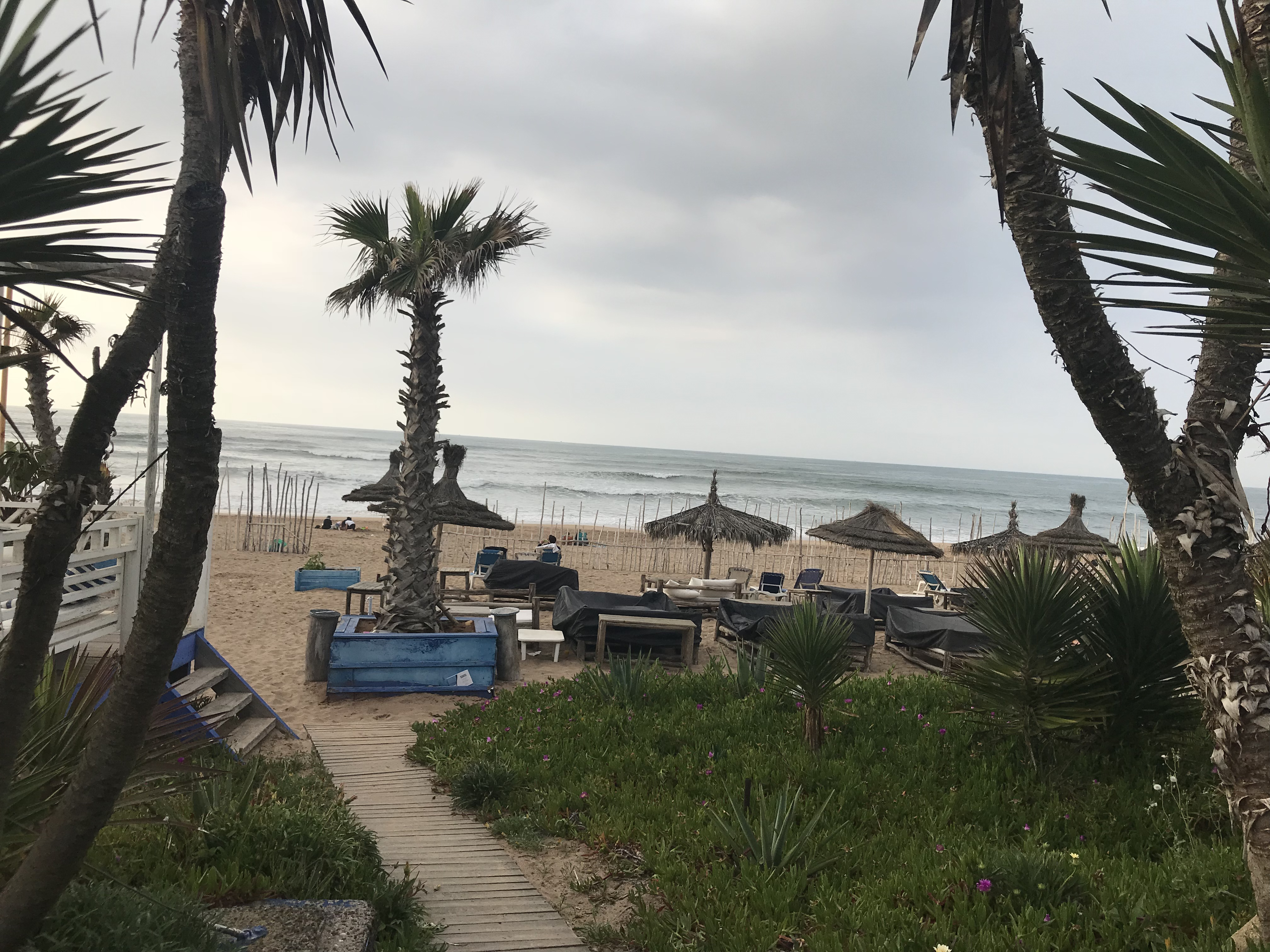
- Tamaris Beach, Dar Bouazza
- Interactive map of Dar Bouazza
- Coordinates: 33.52°N 7.82°W
- Country: Morocco
- Region: Casablanca-Settat
- Province: Nouaceur
- Established: 2008

Area
  - Total: 48.36 km^{2} (18.67 sq mi)

Population (September 2024)
  - Total: 302,970
  - Density: 6,265/km^{2} (16,230/sq mi)
- Time zone: UTC+0 (GMT)

Dar Bouazza (Arabic: دار بو عزة, romanized: dār bū ʿazza, lit. 'house of the father of Azza'), is a municipality in Nouaceur Province, Casablanca-Settat, Morocco. Covering an area of 48.36 km^{2}, it had a recorded a population of 302,970 as of 2024.

It is composed of two rapidly growing suburbs of Casablanca: the upscale seaside district of Tamaris and the popular district of Errahma.

== Geography ==
Dar Bouazza is located on the Chaouia plain on Morocco's Atlantic coast. It adjoins the Atlantic Ocean to the north, the city of Casablanca to the east, the rural commune of Ouled Azzouz to the south, and Berrechid Province to the west. It consists of two neighbourhoods: Tamaris to the west, where the beaches and municipal headquarters are located; and Errahma to the east, site of the new town currently under construction.

Dar Bouazza is well known in Morocco for its beautiful beaches. In the 1940s, the Jaquier family built the first seaside resort in the area, lending their name to Jack Beach in the process.

The wetlands or dayas of Dar Bouazza are located on the coast near the border with Casablanca and are the last of their kind remaining in the Casablanca area. Since 2011, 177 species of birds have been recorded in the wetlands, which are threatened by dumping and nearby construction.

The intermittent Wadi Merzeg flows through the municipality.

== Administrative history ==
Prior to 2008, Dar Bouazza was a rural commune in Nouaceur Province. In 2008, the rural commune of Ouled Azzouz was separated from the southern part of Dar Bouazza, which itself was made a municipality.

== Society ==
Dar Bouazza is currently experiencing a rapid transformation from a rural farming and fishing community to a residential suburb and tourist destination. The former rural commune of Dar Bouazza (comprising the present-day municipality of Dar Bouazza and the rural commune of Ouled Azzouz) increased in population from 45,177 in the 1994 census to 115,367 in the 2004 census. The rapid growth of the municipality has placed severe strain on its infrastructure and services and exacerbated problems of illiteracy, poverty, and marginalization.

== Education ==
École Belge de Casablanca (Belgian School of Casablanca) maintains its primary school in Tamaris, Dar Bouazza. This campus opened in 2015.
