= 1973 Royal Air Maroc Sud Aviation Caravelle crash =

1973 aviation accident

Coordinates: 35.67°N 5.43°W

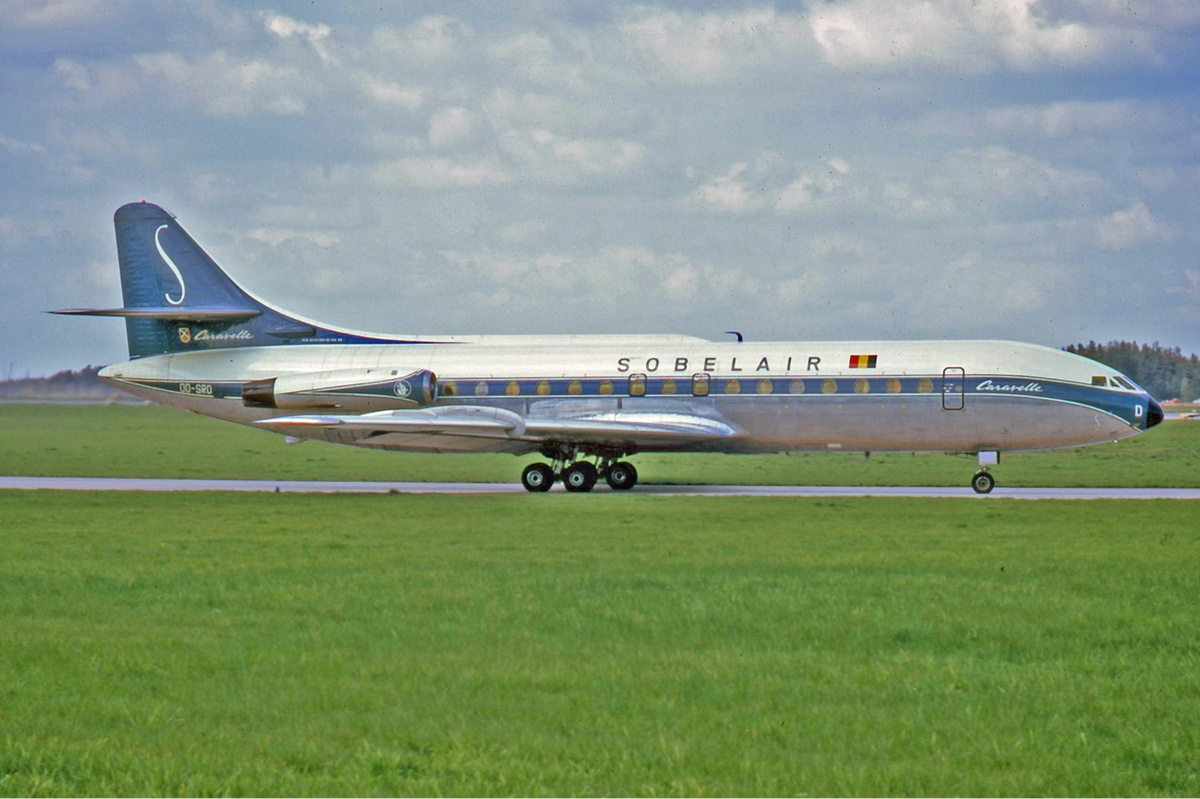
- OO-SRD, the aircraft involved in the accident

Accident
- Date: December 22, 1973
- Summary: Controlled flight into terrain due to pilot error and navigation error
- Site: Mount Mellaline, near Tanger-Boukhalef Airport, Tangier, Morocco

Aircraft
- Aircraft type: Sud Aviation Caravelle SE-210 VI-N
- Operator: Sobelair for Royal Air Maroc
- Registration: OO-SRD
- Flight origin: Paris–Le Bourget Airport, Paris, France
- Stopover: Tanger-Boukhalef Airport, Tangier, Morocco
- Destination: Mohammed V International Airport, Casablanca, Morocco
- Occupants: 106
- Passengers: 99
- Crew: 7
- Fatalities: 106
- Survivors: 0

The 1973 Royal Air Maroc Sud Aviation Caravelle crash occurred on December 22, 1973, when a Sobelair Sud Aviation Caravelle SE-210 (operating for Royal Air Maroc) crashed near Tangier, Morocco. All 106 people on board were killed.

== Aircraft ==
The aircraft was a 12-year-old Sud Aviation Caravelle SE-210 VI-N. Its maiden flight was on February 23, 1961. It was delivered to Sabena on March 1, 1961, and registered as OO-SRD. In April 1971, the aircraft was leased to Sobelair. In December 1973, OO-SRD was subleased to Royal Air Maroc.

== Accident ==
The aircraft was leased to Royal Air Maroc to operate a passenger flight from Paris, France, to Casablanca, Morocco, with a stopover in Tangier. Most of the 98 passengers were Moroccan students and workers, as well as French tourists traveling to Morocco for Christmas. Nearly all of the eight crew members were Belgian, except for one Moroccan flight attendant. The aircraft approached runway 28 at Tangier-Boukhalef Airport at night in rainy weather. During the approach, the aircraft made a delayed turn and entered a mountainous area. The crew was assigned a safe holding altitude of 3,000 feet (910 m). The flight was then cleared to land and the aircraft resumed its descent. At 10:10 pm (or 10:07 pm according to some sources,) local time, the aircraft crashed into Mount Mellaline, located 20 miles east of Tangier-Boukhalef Airport at an altitude of 2,300–2,400 feet (700–730 m), killing all 106 people on board. It was the deadliest aviation disaster to occur in Morocco until the Agadir air disaster in 1975. It remains the deadliest aviation disaster involving a Belgian airline and is the second deadliest accident involving a Sud Aviation Caravelle, behind Sterling Airways Flight 296.

== See also ==
- American Airlines Flight 965
