= Hassan Ababou =

- حسن عبابو
- Born: Morocco
- Occupation: politician
- Known for: Minister of Tourism, Air Transport, Craft & Social Economy of Morocco
- Term: 10 July 1965 – 18 January 1968

Hassan Ababou (Arabic: حسن عبابو) is a former Moroccan politician who served as the Minister of Tourism, Air Transport, Craft & Social Economy of Morocco.

== Biography ==
Hassan Ababou was born into a Makhzen family of Amazigh descent in Morocco, and belonged to the well-known Ababou family.

=== Political career ===
Hassan Ababou held the position of Minister of Tourism in independent Morocco from July 10, 1965, to January 18, 1968.

=== Other roles ===
- Commercial Director of Royal Air Maroc until July 10, 1965.
- General Director of the Moroccan Deposit and Management Fund from January 18, 1968 until 1970.
