= Écoles Belges au Maroc =

Ecole Belge de Casablanca

Location
- Tamaris, Morocco
- Coordinates: 33.5405°N 7.7736°W

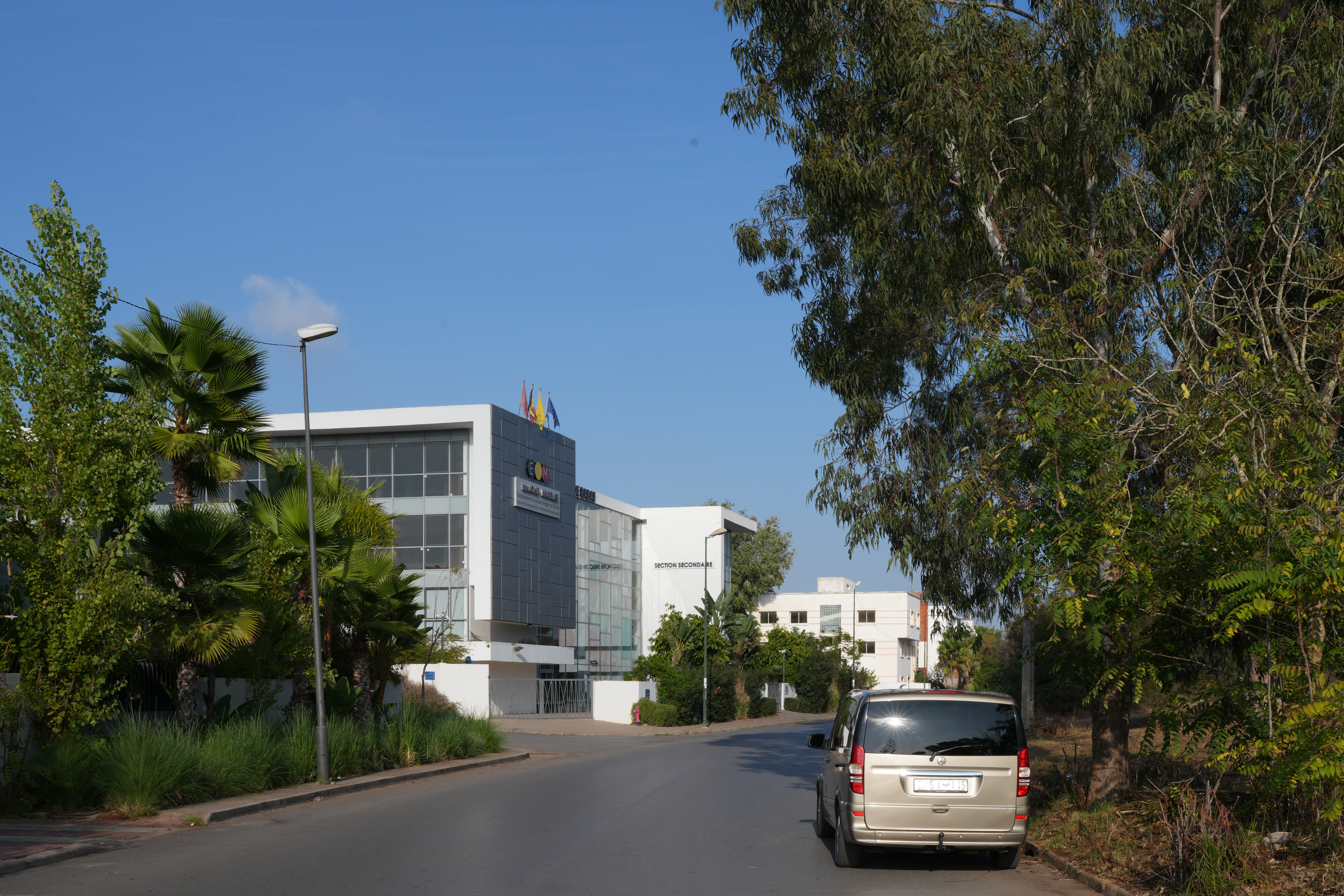
École Belge de Rabat, Ave Al Eucalypthus, Agdal-Riyad, Rabat

Écoles Belges au Maroc (EBM) is a Belgian international school network in Morocco. It consists of École Belge de Casablanca, with a primary school location in Tamaris, Dar Bouazza, Nouaceur Province; and a secondary school location in Ouled Azzouz; and the École Belge de Rabat in Rabat.

The network serves ages 2 1/2-18 and operates under the authority of the French Community of Belgium, also known as the Federation Wallonia-Brussels (FWB). It is a part of the Association des écoles à programme belge à l'étranger (AEBE).

== History ==
The Casablanca school had 524 students in 2014, when it opened, with its initial campus in Dar Bouazza. Its enrollment was above projections. By 2015 enrollment was up to 528 students, with 22% of the students being Belgian. That year, there were 42 Belgian and 23 Moroccan teachers. The new secondary campus for the Casablanca school was scheduled to open in 2017.

The Rabat campus was scheduled to open in 2018. Groundbreaking occurred in January 2017. It opened the following year with 250 students.

== Campuses ==
The Tamaris campus is about 9 kilometres (5.6 mi) from the Morocco Mall.
