= Nouaceur =

Municipality in Morocco

Coordinates: 33°21′40″N 7°36′41″W

Nouaceur (Arabic: النواصر, romanized: an-Nawāṣir, locally Nnwāṣir) is a municipality and the administrative capital of Nouaceur Province in the Casablanca-Settat region of Morocco. At the 2004 census it had a population of 12,696. The largest airport in Morocco is in Nouaceur.
