= Atlas Blue =

Moroccan low-cost airline

IATA	ICAO	Call sign
8A	BMM	ATLAS BLUE
- Founded: 2004
- Ceased operations: 2009 (merged into Royal Air Maroc)
- Hubs: Marrakesh Menara Airport; Tangier Ibn Battouta Airport
- Secondary hubs: Agadir–Al Massira Airport; Nador International Airport
- Fleet size: 14 (upon merger)
- Destinations: 26
- Parent company: Royal Air Maroc
- Headquarters: Marrakesh, Morocco
- Key people: Driss Benhima
- Website: www.atlas-blue.com (now defunct) http://www.royalairmaroc.com/ (since merger)

Atlas Blue was a low-cost airline with its head office on the grounds of Marrakesh Menara Airport in Marrakesh, Morocco, operating out of Marrakesh Menara Airport.

Atlas Blue was a subsidiary of Royal Air Maroc (RAM), operating chartered and scheduled services to Europe. During 2010, Atlas Blue flights were rebranded as Royal Air Maroc flights, with the aircraft being re-painted in RAM livery.

== History ==
Atlas Blue was established on 28 May 2004 and started operations on 26 July 2004, with charter operations from Morocco to France using a single Boeing 737-400. Another 5 Boeing 737-400s were transferred from Royal Air Maroc to expand services to Belgium, Germany, Italy and the United Kingdom. Atlas Blue is owned by Royal Air Maroc (99.99%) and private investors (0.01%), and has 167 employees.

At the end of 2009, Royal Air Maroc bought Atlas Blue. The Atlas Blue website was shut down on 21 January 2010. By the end of 2010, the Atlas Blue brand ceased to exist.

== Destinations ==
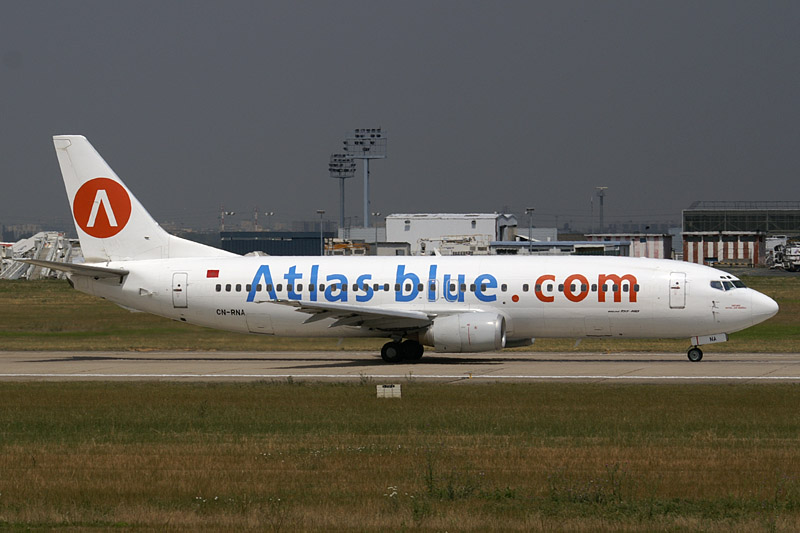
Atlas Blue Boeing 737-400

Atlas Blue operated scheduled flights to the following destinations (as of February 2010):

=== Africa ===
- Morocco
  - Agadir - Al Massira Airport focus city
  - Al Hoceima - Cherif Al Idrissi Airport
  - Essaouira - Mogador Airport
  - Fez - Saïss Airport
  - Marrakesh - Marrakesh Menara Airport Hub
  - Nador - Nador International Airport Focus city
  - Ouarzazate - Ouarzazate Airport
  - Oujda - Angads Airport
  - Tangier - Ibn Batouta International Airport Secondary Hub

=== Europe ===
- Belgium
  - Brussels - Brussels Airport focus city
- Germany
  - Düsseldorf - Düsseldorf Airport [seasonal]
  - Frankfurt - Frankfurt Airport
  - Munich - Munich Airport
- France
  - Bordeaux - Bordeaux - Mérignac Airport
  - Lille - Lesquin Airport
  - Lyon - Saint-Exupéry Airport
  - Marseille - Provence Airport
  - Metz/Nancy - Metz-Nancy-Lorraine Airport [seasonal]
  - Nantes - Atlantique Airport
  - Nice - Côte d'Azur Airport
  - Paris - Orly Airport
  - Saint-Étienne – Bouthéon Airport [seasonal]
  - Toulouse - Blagnac Airport
- Italy
  - Milan - Malpensa Airport
- Poland
  - Warsaw - Warsaw Airport
- Netherlands
  - Amsterdam - Amsterdam Airport Schiphol
- Spain
  - Barcelona - Barcelona Airport
  - Madrid - Barajas Airport
- Switzerland
  - Geneva - Geneva International Airport
- United Kingdom
  - London
    - London Gatwick Airport
    - London Heathrow Airport

== Fleet ==
The Atlas Blue fleet consisted of the following aircraft (as of January 2010)

Fleet
Aircraft	Total	Orders	Passengers (Economy)
Airbus A321-200	4	0	185
Boeing 737-400	6	0	168
Boeing 737-500	1	0	135
Boeing 737-800	1	0	189
Total	11		

As of August 2010, all aircraft except of two Airbus A321 have been handed over to Royal Air Maroc.
