= Atlas Hospitality =

Moroccan hospitality company

Atlas Hospitality is a private corporate group that owns and manages hotels in Morocco. Headquartered in Casablanca, the company offers 5-star and 4-star hotels throughout Morocco.

== History ==
Atlas Hospitality was founded in 1996 by Mohamed Berrada who was then CEO of national flag carrier Royal Air Maroc. In 2005, Kamal Bensouda was named CEO of the group.

The group expanded its ownership of hotels from two units to 19 and became the second largest hotel operator in Morocco. In 2005, Atlas Hospitality was made up of eight units. Between 2006-2007, it moved to owning 12 units, this included the launching of 1500 beds in Agadir, Essaouira, and Taliouine and the opening of a hotel named “Atlas Rif Front Beach” in Tangier for the international conference of tourism.

In 2010, RAM ceased its participation in Atlas Hospitality and yielded its 66% stake to H-Partners, a private investment fund that specialises in tourism. The other 34% stake of Atlas Hospitality is owned by Moroccan holding company SNI. That same year, the hotel chain partnered with Akwa Group and Somed Group.

In 2015, Atlas Hospitality was allocated $55 million by Royal Air Maroc to buy existing hotels and build new ones in various regions including Essaouira and Al Hoceima.

In 2016, Atlas Hospitality signed a joint venture with the FTI Group (4th largest tour operator in Germany). This partnership aimed to invest 1.1 billion dirhams and consisted of revamping the following clubs: Atlas Targa Club, the Idrissides Urban Club and the Dunes d’Or Beach Club. FTI planned on increasing the number of flights to Morocco to eleven per week and the number of travellers to 150,000 by 2018. As of December 2016, three Atlas Hotels were rebranded into Labranda Targa Club, Labranda Dunes D’Or Beach Club and Labranda the Idrissides. The joint venture also aimed to build three hotels in the Chbika region by 2020.
