= RAM Cargo =

Moroccan cargo airline

Royal Air Maroc Cargo الخطوط الملكية المغربية للشحن
IATA	ICAO	Call sign
AT	RAM	RAM
- Founded: 1957
- Hubs: Mohammed V International Airport
- Fleet size: 1 + 1 on order
- Destinations: 20
- Parent company: Royal Air Maroc
- Headquarters: Casablanca, Morocco
- Website: royalairmaroc.com

Royal Air Maroc Cargo, also branded as RAM Cargo, is the cargo airline subsidiary of Royal Air Maroc based out of Mohammed V International Airport in Casablanca.

== Destinations ==
As of November 2020, Royal Air Maroc Cargo serves the following dedicated freight destinations:

Belgium

- Brussels - Brussels Airport

Cameroon

- Douala - Douala International Airport

Gabon

- Libreville - Léon-Mba International Airport

Germany

- Frankfurt am Main - Frankfurt Airport

Ghana

- Accra - Accra International Airport

Ivory Coast

- Abidjan - Félix-Houphouët-Boigny International Airport

Mali

- Bamako - Modibo Keita International Airport

Morocco

- Casablanca - Mohammed V International Airport base

Nigeria

- Lagos - Murtala Muhammed International Airport

Spain

- Madrid - Adolfo Suárez Madrid–Barajas Airport

United Kingdom

- London - Gatwick Airport

== Fleet ==
As of September 2025, RAM Cargo operates the following dedicated freight aircraft:

RAM Cargo previously operated a single Boeing 737-300F CN-ROX from August 2009 to April 2018. In June 2025, Royal Air Maroc announced it would acquire a Boeing 737 Freighter to expand its cargo operations, expected to enter service in mid-2026. It is yet unclear if the frame will be a conversion of one of its existing passenger 737-800s or acquired elsewhere.

Royal Air Maroc Cargo fleet
Aircraft	In service	Orders	Notes
Boeing 767-300BCF	1	—	
Boeing 737F	—	1	
Total	1	1	
