= Nouaceur Province =

Province of Morocco

Coordinates: 33°21′40″N 7°36′41″W

Nouaceur Province إقليم النواصر
- Province
- Interactive map of Nouaceur Province
- Country: Morocco
- Region: Casablanca-Settat
- Capital: Nouaceur

Population (2024)
  - Total: 672,324

Nouaceur (Arabic: إقليم النواصر, romanized: iqlīm an-Nawāṣir; French: Province de Nouaceur) is a province in the Moroccan region of Casablanca-Settat. Its population in 2024 was 672,324. The biggest city is Dar Bouazza, although the administrative centre is Nouaceur.

Mohammed V International Airport is in Nouaceur. In 2004 Royal Air Maroc announced that it was moving its head office from Casablanca to a location in Nouaceur, close to Mohammed V International Airport. The agreement to build the head office in Nouaceur was signed in 2009. Air Arabia Maroc has its head office in the arrivals terminal of the airport.

== Subdivisions ==
The province is divided administratively into the following:

Name	Geographic code	Type	Households	Population (2004)	Foreign population	Moroccan population	Notes
Nouaceur	385.01.03.	Municipality	2349	12696	7	12689	
Bouskoura	385.03.01.	Rural commune	19709	92259	77	92182	13453 residents live in the center called Bouskoura, and 33940 residents live in the center called Lamkanssa; 44866 residents live in rural areas.
Dar Bouazza	385.03.03.	Rural commune	25507	115367	150	115217	
Oulad Salah	385.03.05.	Rural commune	2970	15797	0	15797	
