= Agropolis =

Museum in Montpellier, France

Coordinates: 43°38′46″N 3°52′4″E

Agropolis-Museum was a museum describing the global story of people, food and agriculture. It was located in Montpellier, France, but had to close in July 2010 due to a lack of funding.

Agropolis-Museum was conceived as a museum of the world's food and agricultures by fr:Louis Malassis in 1986, and enjoyed the support of the scientific community of Montpellier. In a building that was inaugurated in 1993, several museal sections were successively added to constitute a top level scientific and pedagogic entity.

Agropolis presented the history of early food gathering, as well as mini-exhibits on many of the world's fruits, vegetables and food animals. In one set of exhibits, visitor could 'meet' eight farmers from around the world, see how their homes might look and hear their stories on video. Another exhibition recreated some of the world's food and drink preparations, for example, the tea ceremony in Japan, pasta making in Italy, and coffee rituals in Ethiopia.

At the core of the building there was a permanent sculptural exhibition called "The Banquet of Humanity", or "The Dining Table of the World". Eight couples sit at a round table set in furrowed ground. At the center is water and, perched atop the water, the Earth. The couples represent three poor countries, three average income countries and two rich countries. The rich are from Japan and France, the poorest from Somalia. Outside the circle there is another couple, excluded from the table. The work, by Henri Rouvieres, is intended to illustrate the food problems in the world.

== See also ==
- Hunger
- List of museums
