= Air Atlas =

Airline in Morocco

IATA	ICAO	Call sign
- Founded: 1946
- Ceased operations: 1953
- Fleet size: 7 (1953)
- Headquarters: Casablanca, Morocco.

Air Atlas (Compagnie Cherifienne de l'Air) was a Moroccan airline based in Casablanca. Air Atlas was registered on 9 October 1946. They commenced flying with Junkers Ju 52s.

The airline operated services from Morocco to Algeria, France and Spain from 1946 to 1953.

They merged with Compagnie Chérifienne de Transports Aériens Air Maroc on 28 June 1953 to become Compagnie Nationale de Transports Aériens which in 1957 became Royal Air Maroc.

== Fleet ==
The fleet in 1953:

- 2 x SNCASE Languedoc
- 5 x Douglas DC-3 These planes were absorbed into the new Compagnie Nationale de Transports Aériens in 1953
