= Air Arabia Maroc =

Low-cost airline of Morocco

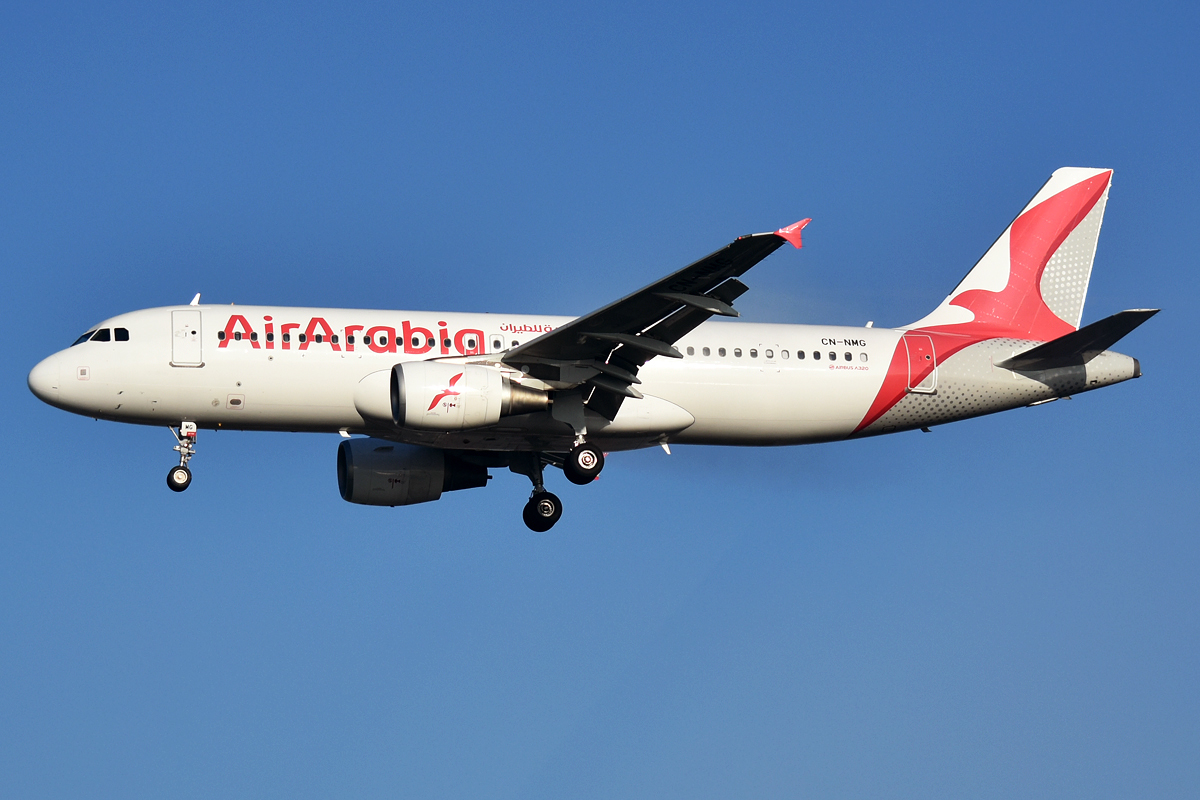
- Air Arabia Maroc A320 in standard livery
IATA	ICAO	Call sign
3O	MAC	ARABIA MAROC
- Founded: April 2009; 16 years ago
- Commenced operations: May 2009; 16 years ago
- Operating bases: Casablanca; Fès; Nador; Tangier
- Fleet size: 11
- Destinations: 40
- Parent company: Air Arabia
- Headquarters: Nouaceur Province, Morocco
- Key people: Laila Mechbal (COO)
- Website: www.airarabia.com

Air Arabia Maroc (Arabic: العربية للطيران المغرب) is a Moroccan low-cost airline, set up as a joint venture between various Moroccan investors and Air Arabia. Its head office is located in the Arrivals Terminal of Mohammed V International Airport in Nouaceur Province, Morocco in Greater Casablanca.

== History ==
Air Arabia Maroc was founded as a partnership between Air Arabia, Regional Air Lines and Ithmaar Bank. The low-cost carrier was officially launched on 29 April 2009, and started operations on 6 May the same year, with its maiden flight serving the Casablanca–London Stansted route. Radiating from Casablanca, the first destinations served were Brussels, London, Marseille, Milan and Paris. In July the same year, Jason Bitter —former CEO of SkyEurope— was appointed Air Arabia Maroc's CEO.

In October 2019, Air Arabia Maroc unveiled plans to shut down it base at Agadir–Al Massira Airport and close several routes in the same month.

In September 2024, following allegations of non-compliance in the operations and airworthiness domains, EASA conducted an on-site technical assessment at the facilities of Air Arabia Maroc. The results of the audit, released publicly in October 2024, revealed critical and serious safety issues, in particular with regard to crew duty time limitations and aircraft airworthiness.

== Fleet ==
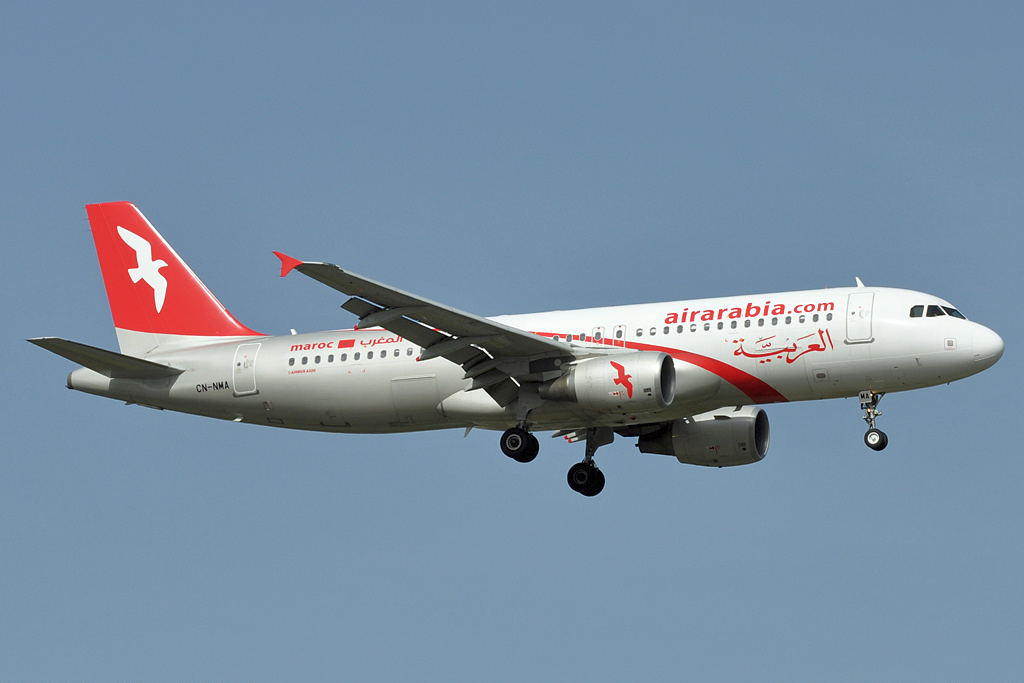
Air Arabia Maroc Airbus A320-200

As of August 2025, Air Arabia Maroc operates the following aircraft:

Air Arabia Maroc fleet
Aircraft	In service	Orders	Passengers	Notes
Airbus A320-200	11	—	162	
Airbus A320-200	11	—	168	
Total	11	—		

== See also ==
- List of airlines of Morocco
- Transport in Morocco
