= Air Atlas Express =

Moroccan charter airline

IATA	ICAO	Call sign
-	AXP	Atlas Express
- Founded: December 20, 2002
- Commenced operations: 2002
- Ceased operations: 2004
- Hubs: Agadir, Casablanca
- Fleet size: 1
- Destinations: Paris, London, Dublin, Porto, Brussels, Lisbon, Amsterdam, Kyiv, Istanbul, Tunis, Toulouse, Lyon, Brest
- Headquarters: MENGOUCHI Mohammed CEO

Air Atlas Express was a charter airline based in Morocco, offering flights to Maghreb destinations, mostly from Paris. It started operations on December 20, 2002, and ceased operations in 2004.

== Fleet ==
The Air Atlas Express fleet included:

- 1 Boeing 737-400
