= Taxis of Morocco =

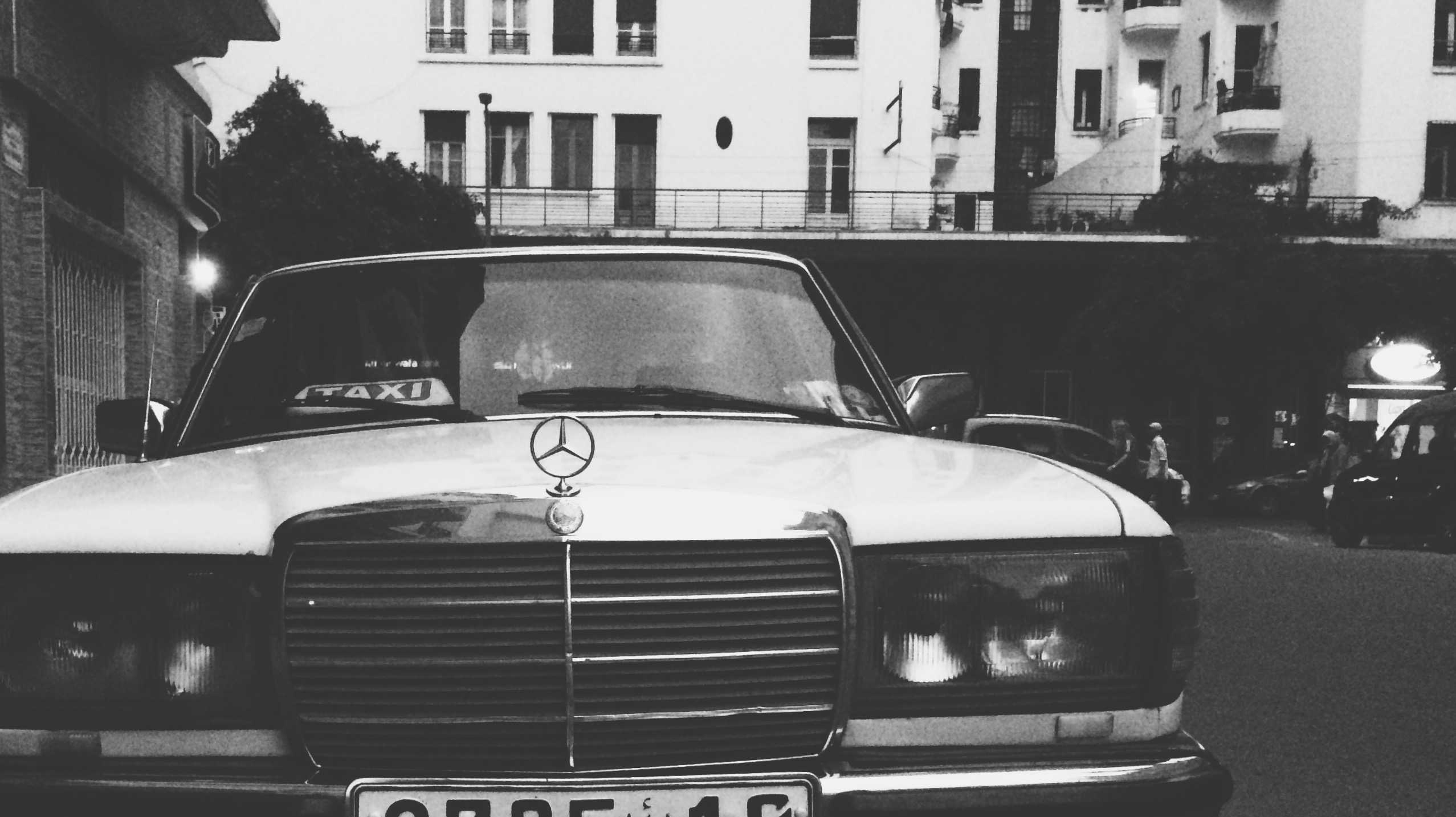
Mercedes Grand Taxi in Casablanca's Centre Ville

Two main types of taxis can be found in Morocco: petits taxis and grands taxis.

== Inner city transport ==
Moroccan cities have dedicated taxis for transport inside the city limits. Although some of the largest cities operate city buslines most people prefer to use a petit taxi for point-to-point transport within city limits.

== Regional transport ==
For journeys to regional destinations beyond the city limits, one can choose between buses (public buses for nearby destinations and private "luxury" buses for long distance and even cross-country) or the so-called grand taxi.

== Petits Taxis ==
A petit taxi is a smaller model car painted in the designated color, which differs from city to city. It has a maximum capacity of three passengers plus the driver. There are special stops for petits taxis, often combined with a grand taxi stop, where these taxis are allowed to park and wait for customers. However, in most cases customers will signal or shout for a taxi when an empty one passes.

Normally a customer hires the complete taxi for the trip and pays a fare for that trip: it does not matter if one is alone or with a party of up to three. When there is still a vacant seat the driver might pick up another passenger if he spots a potential customer for a trip in more or less the same direction.

In most cities the drivers use a few fixed tariffs for popular destinations depending on the distance and also time of day (more expensive late at night). Taxis in busy cities like Casablanca or Marrakesh are generally more expensive than in a city like Nador.

To prevent abuse by drivers of (mainly) foreign tourists some cities require a petit taxi to use a meter. In that case the fare depends on distance travelled. After 9 p.m. fares are generally 50% higher. Tourist-information brochures advise tourists to insist on using the meter or agree on a fixed price in advance.

Petits taxis are small cars such as a Fiat Uno, Peugeot 205 and similar sized models using diesel as fuel. In general the cars used are quite old (mostly from the 1990s); often the interior is overhauled and/or is a state of disrepair - at least in comparison with European standards. However, some newer models, mainly Dacia Logans (which are being produced in Morocco) can be seen regularly. To allow passengers to carry luggage most cars are equipped with a simple open wooden box on the roof where oversized goods are placed without anything to secure it. As the speed inside the city limits is never high this method does not lead to many accidents.

The sides of this roof-rack is also the place where petit taxi is printed together with their local registration number.

=== Colors ===
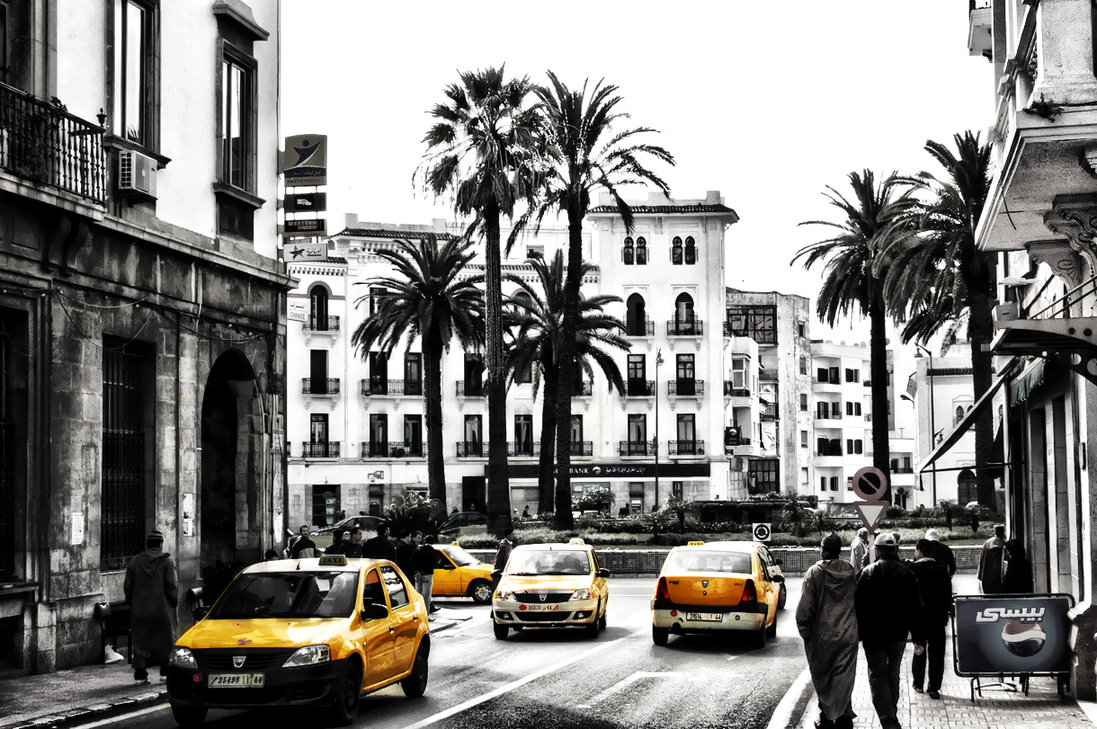
Petit taxis coloured in yellow at the center of Tetouan city, Morocco

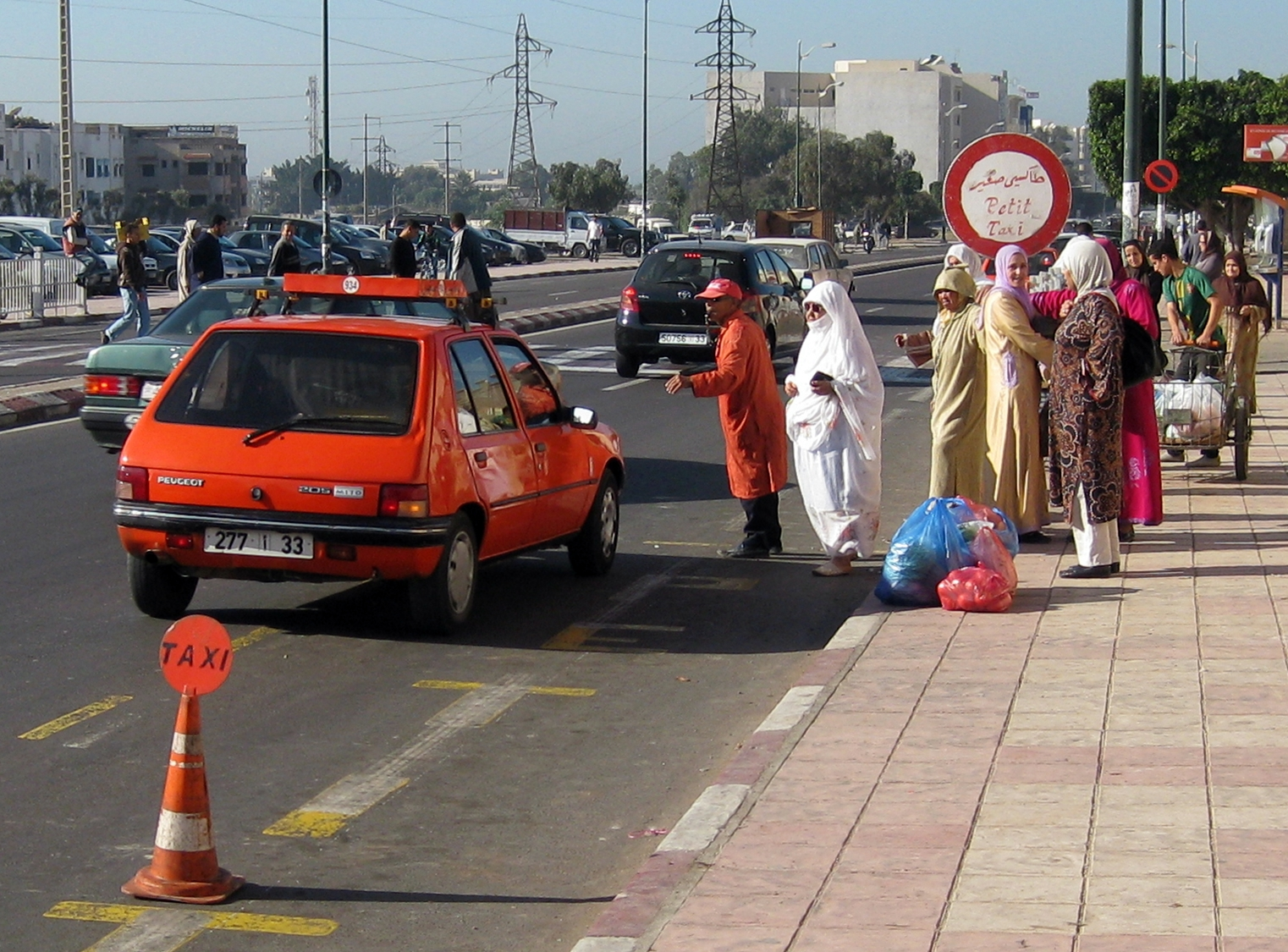
Petit Taxi in Agadir

Some examples of colors used in Moroccan cities for petits taxis:

- Blue: Al Hoceima, Errachidia, Saïdia, Rabat, Chefchaouen.
- Light blue: Tanger (HZYL), Meknes.
- Red: Nador, Azilal, Casablanca, Fez, Oujda, Agadir.
- White: Ouarzazate, Taroudannt, El Jadida, Kenitra.
- Ochre: Marrakesh.
- Orange: Berkane, Agadir.
- Yellow: Beni Mellal, Midelt, Salé.
- Light yellow: Tétouan.
- Green: Azrou, Aklim, Ifrane.
- Light green: Mohammedia.
- Pink: Kalaat M'Gouna.

== Grands Taxis ==
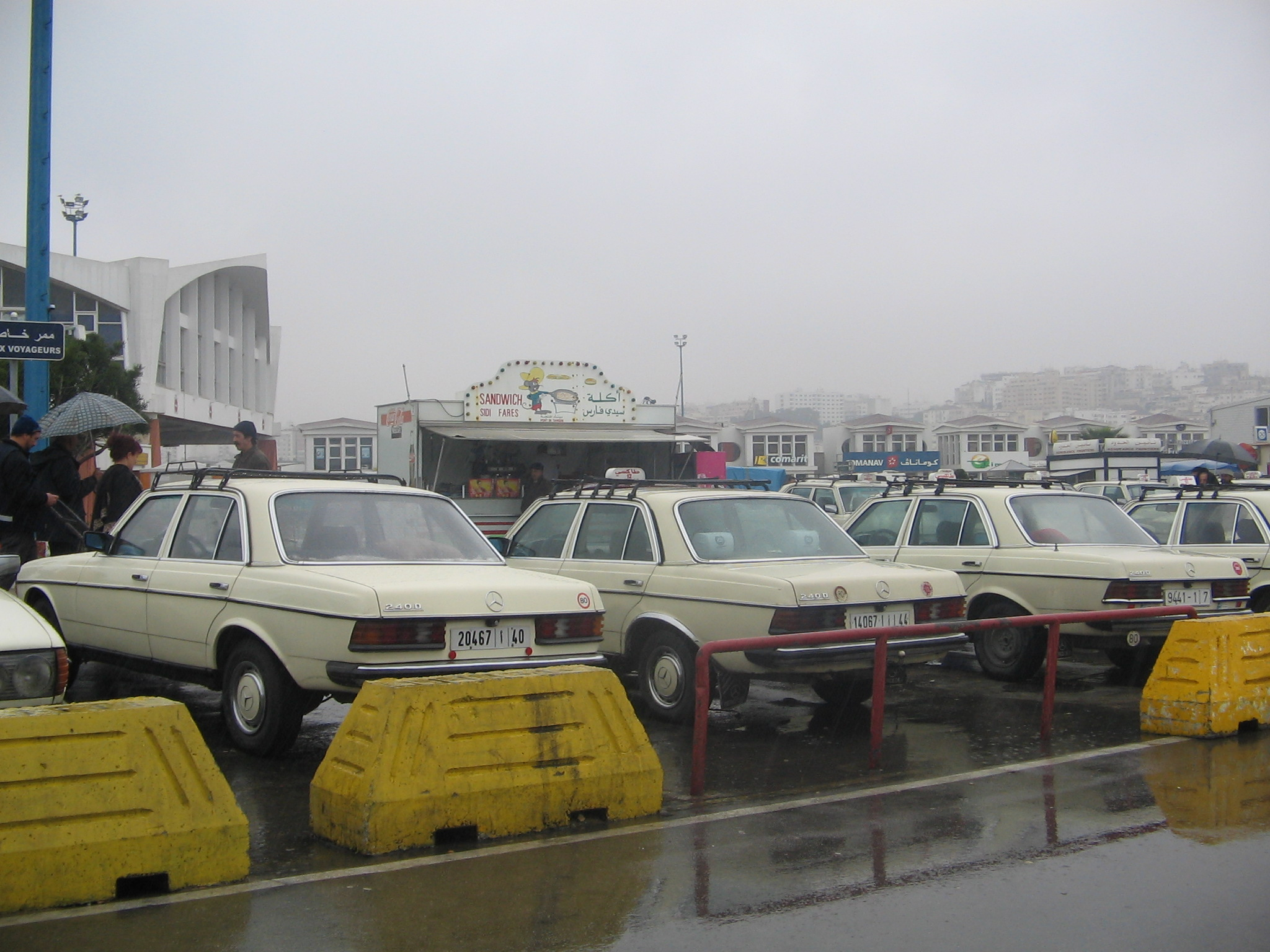
Grand taxi in Tanger port

Whereas petits taxis are only for local city traffic, grands taxis are mostly used for city-to-city or -village transport. Normally a grand taxi is a shared vehicle: at the main taxi stands many grands taxis gather. It is a type of share taxi system but without timetables or government influence. Each taxi will drive a more or less fixed route to a set destination and all passengers looking for transport to that destination or somewhere along the route used share one grand taxi. When the taxi is full (maximum four passengers on the rear seat and two on the front-passenger chair) it will depart. The driver might depart earlier if it takes too long to wait for a full car and/or when the driver expects to pick up more passengers along the route.

Although this shared use is cheap, it is not always very comfortable for longer trips in hot summers: seven people (including driver) are packed in a 1970s to 1980s four-door Mercedes without air conditioning. Many people prefer to charter a complete taxi and agree on a fixed price before departure.

Grands taxis are almost exclusively older Mercedes-Benz W123 sedthis government project, the Renault automobile company in Tangier reportedly said earlier that it would offer a discount of MAD10,000 for taxi drivers who wish to replace their old Mercedes 240 Diesel with a new Dacia Lodgy.

Since the beginning of 2015, Grand Taxis have notably seen renewed mainly by the Dacia Lodgy, SsangYong Rodius (2nd gen), Mercedes Vito and other 7-seat vans.
