= Royal Air Maroc =

Flag carrier of Morocco

Royal Air Maroc الخطوط الملكية المغربية

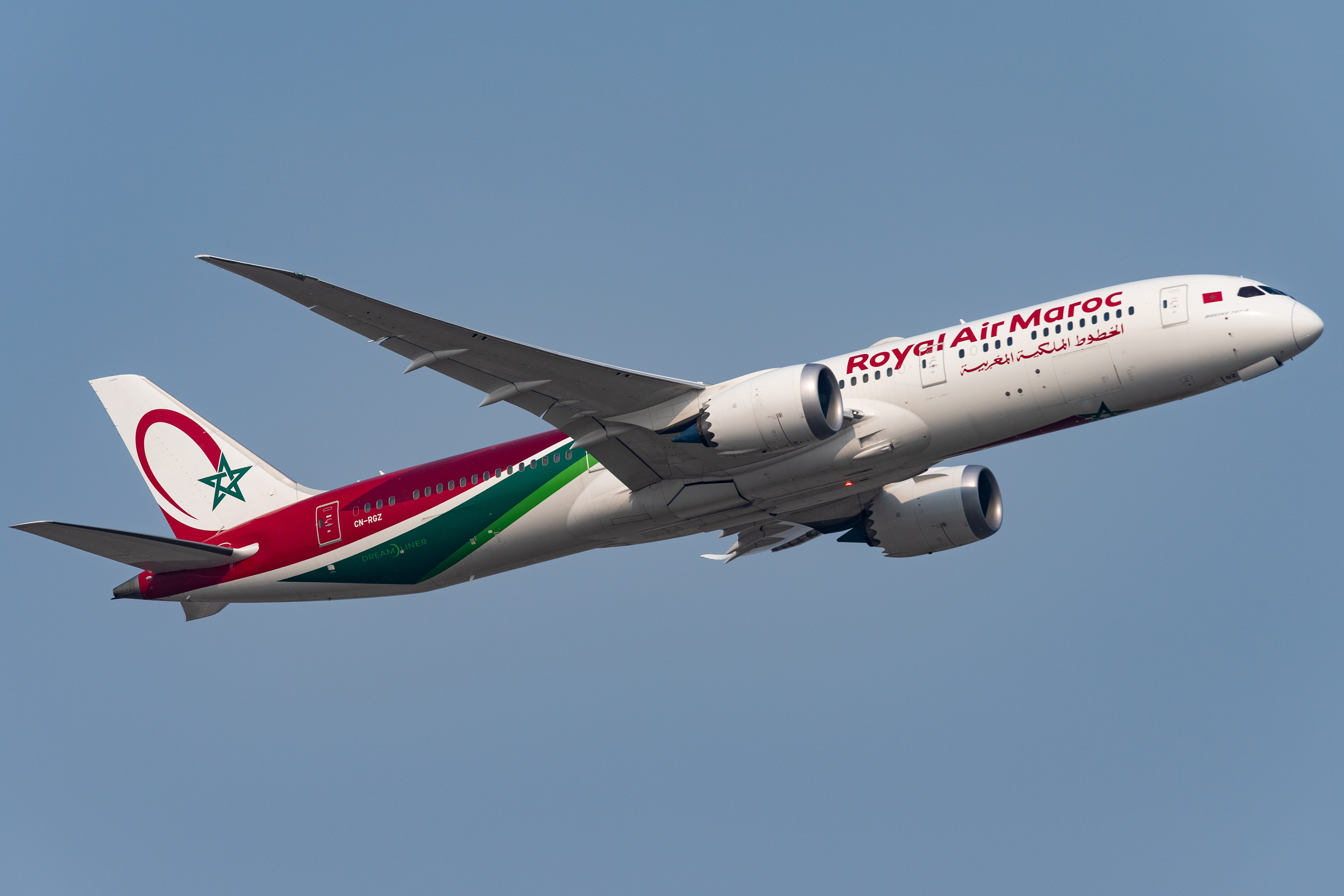
- A Royal Air Maroc Boeing 787 Dreamliner
IATA	ICAO	Call sign
AT	RAM	ROYAL AIR MAROC
- Founded: July 1953; 73 years ago
- Hubs: Casablanca; Tangier
- Focus cities: Marrakesh
- Frequent-flyer program: Safar Flyer
- Alliance: Oneworld
- Subsidiaries: RAM Cargo; RAM Express
- Fleet size: 61
- Destinations: 108
- Parent company: Moroccan Government
- Headquarters: Casablanca-Anfa Airport, Casablanca, Morocco
- Key people: Hamid Addou (CEO)
- Revenue: US$1.7 billion (FY 2017)
- Operating income: US$48.5 million (FY 2017)
- Employees: 5,413
- Website: www.royalairmaroc.com

Royal Air Maroc (RAM, French: [ʁwajal ɛːʁ maʁɔk]; Arabic: الخطوط الملكية المغربية, romanised: al-Khuṭūṭu l-Malakiyyatu l-Maghribiyyah, lit. 'Royal Moroccan [Air]Lines') is the Moroccan national carrier, as well as the country's largest airline, ranking among the largest in Africa.

RAM is wholly owned by the Moroccan Government, and has its headquarters on the grounds of Casablanca-Anfa Airport. It joined the Oneworld alliance in 2020.

From its base at Mohammed V International Airport, the carrier operates a domestic network in Morocco, scheduled international flights to Africa, Asia, Europe, North America and South America, and occasional charter flights that include Hajj services. As of November 2023, the airline serves 45 countries and 134 routes.

== History ==
=== Formation ===
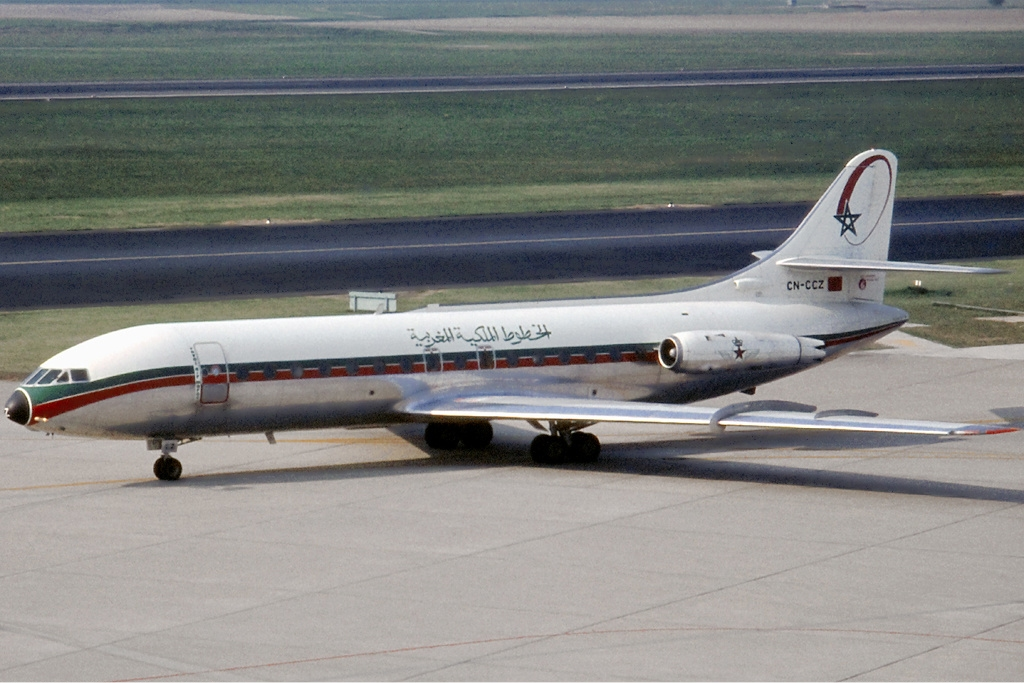
Royal Air Maroc Caravelle at Düsseldorf Airport in 1973. The carrier ordered its first two aircraft of the type in 1958.

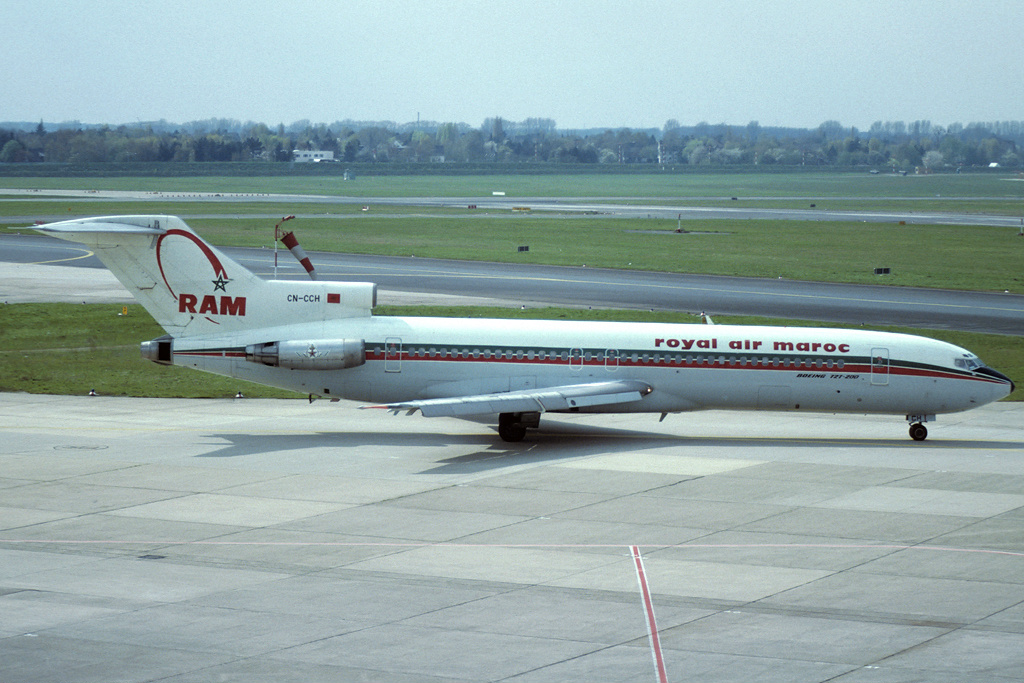
Royal Air Maroc Boeing 727-200 Advanced at Düsseldorf Airport in 1993.

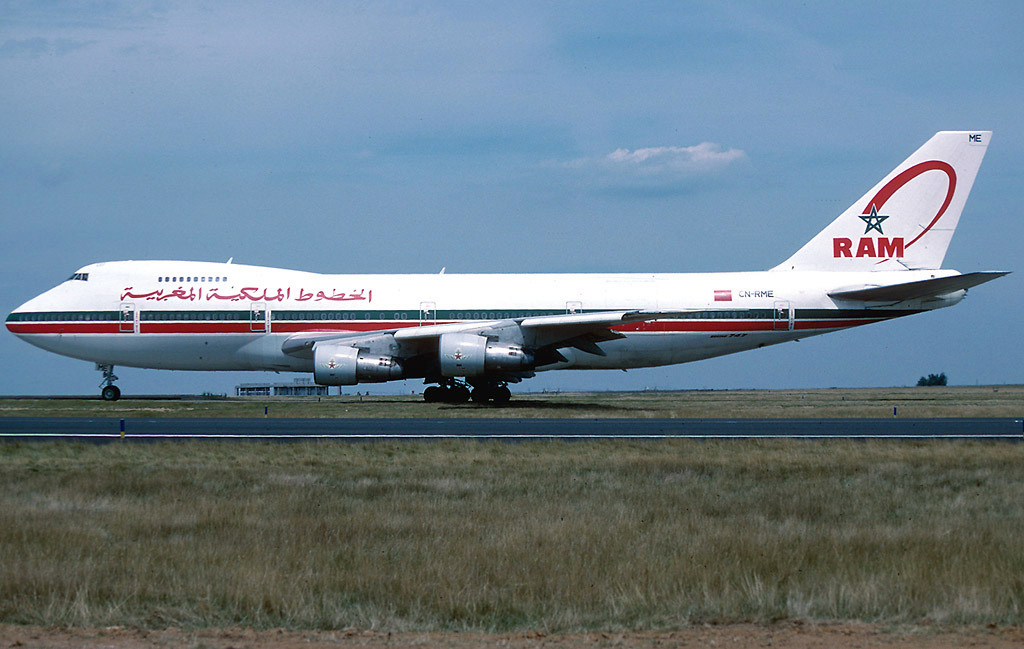
Royal Air Maroc Boeing 747-200B at Charles de Gaulle Airport in 1996.

Royal Air Maroc—Compagnie Nationale de Transports Aériens was formed in July 1953 as a result of the merger of Compagnie Chérifienne de l'Air (Air Atlas) — set up in 1946 with Junkers Ju 52s — and Compagnie Chérifienne de Transports Aériens Air Maroc, that was founded in 1947 and commenced scheduled operations in 1949.

The fleet of the newly formed airline included six Sud-Ouest Bretagnes, four Curtiss C-46 Commandos, five Douglas DC-3s and two SNCASE Languedocs. These aircraft worked on routes previously served by the predecessor companies, and added the cities of Frankfurt, Geneva and Paris.

=== Early years ===
The name Royal Air Maroc was adopted on 28 June 1957, (Note: The title was also reported to have been adopted in February 1957.) with the government of Morocco having a 67.73% stake. Hajj flights commenced in 1957.

The carrier's fleet comprised 16 aircraft by April 1958, including four Douglas DC-4s, three DC-3s, seven Bretagnes and two Curtiss C-46s. In May 1958, the airline ordered two Sud Aviation Caravelles. In July, a number of long-haul routes were launched using four Lockheed L-749 Constellations leased from Air France, and the coastal Oran–Oujda run — which had been suspended in May — was reopened. Also in 1958, the carrier started flying to Gibraltar. The arrival of the Constellations enabled the airline to withdraw the DC-4s from service.

A single Caravelle was part of the fleet of four L-749 Constellations, four DC-4s and three DC-3s by April 1960, making the Caravelle the first jet aircraft operated by the company; another Caravelle was yet to be delivered. The type began serving the Rabat–Bamako route in July 1961. By 1964, there were three Caravelles in the fleet. A fourth was ordered in late 1964.

In April 1965, the company had 758 employees and chairmanship was held by Mohammed Al Fassi. The route network included services within North Africa, and also linked North Africa with France, Germany, Italy, Spain and Switzerland; the Casablanca–Dakar and Casablanca–Las Palmas sectors were also flown. Shareholding at the time was split between the government of Morocco (64%), Air France (21%), Compagnie Generale Transatlantique (7.6%), Aviaco (5%) and others (2.4%). An order for a fifth Caravelle was placed in early 1968. By 1969, all routes to Europe and North Africa were flown using solely these aircraft.

=== 1970s ===
In 1969, the carrier placed its first order with Boeing. Royal Air Maroc took delivery of the first Boeing aircraft, a Boeing 727-200, in 1970, with the carrier deploying it on revenue service on 15 May.

Subsidiary airline Royal Air Inter was formed early in 1970 to undertake domestic routes using Fokker F-27 Friendship equipment; this sister company started operations on 2 April 1970, and by May 1971, it was serving Agadir, Al Hoceima, Casablanca, Fez, Marrakesh, Oujda, Rabat, Tangier and Tetouan. The RAM fleet at May 1971 comprised two Boeing 727-200s, along with four Caravelles. At a cost of US$8.85 million, a third Boeing 727-200 was ordered in 1972. In 1974, the carrier ordered a single Boeing 727-200 Advanced, followed by an order for a fourth Boeing 727-200. Also that year, negotiations with Air France for the lease of a Boeing 707-320B started. By March 1975, the Boeing 707 was part of an 11-strong fleet, along with four Boeing 727-200s, four Caravelles, and two SIAI Marchetti SF.260s. RAM flew the leased Boeing 707 to New York for the first time in April 1975, becoming the first Arab airline in serving this destination. During the year, the company acquired three Boeing 737-200s to replace the Caravelles. Also in 1975, a weekly non-stop service to Rio de Janeiro was started. An order for three more Boeing 727-200s was placed in early 1976. That year, the four Caravelles were withdrawn from service and sold. A Boeing 747-200B entered the fleet in September 1978.

=== 1980s ===
By July 1980, Royal Air Maroc had 3,583 employees. At this time, the carrier's fleet consisted of a single Boeing 747-200B, two Boeing 707-320Cs, one Boeing 707-320, seven Boeing 727-200s and three Boeing 737-200s. Another Boeing 727-200, ordered in January that year, was still pending delivery. At a cost of US$16 million, an additional Boeing 737-200 was ordered in 1981, with the US Export-Import Bank arranging a US$5 million loan to secure the delivery, and RAM and private financers funding the balance. Delivery was slated for March 1982. During 1982, two Boeing 737-200Cs were ordered for US$33 million; deliveries were arranged for March and June 1983. Late that year, the airline joined the International Air Transport Association.

In July 1986, RAM was the first African airline to put the Boeing 757 in service. The first of these aircraft that was delivered to the company set a record for the type when it flew the distance separating Seattle from Casablanca, 4,910 nautical miles (9,090 km; 5,650 mi), non-stop.

=== 1990s ===
In the early days of the decade, the last of the Boeing 707s was removed from the fleet. Meanwhile, newer, more efficient, Classic 400 and 500 series Boeing 737s were introduced to increase the frequency of European routes. By the middle of the decade all 727s had disappeared. To consolidate its North American operations, Royal Air Maroc purchased a single Boeing 747-400. As the decade progressed, new routes to previously under-served African airports were opened.

=== 2000–present ===
With the increasing number of passengers and newly opened routes as well as increasing oil prices, there was a need to buy new aircraft. In 2000, an order for 20 Boeing 737 Next Generation aircraft and 4 Airbus A321s was placed. Meanwhile, more routes to the west and central African cities were opened. RAM was now changing, from providing flights to meet the demands of foreign tourists and Moroccan expatriates, to providing connections between European cities and African cities via the Casablanca hub. In 2002, the company leased two 767s to replace the single 747 in North American routes.

Morocco and the EU signed an open skies agreement in late 2006. This means that Royal Air Maroc will have to face tough competition from low-cost carriers eager to exploit profitable routes between Western Europe and Morocco. A further challenge arises from the high cost of kerosene and the fact that the company may have to drop some of its unprofitable domestic and international routes.

Royal Air Maroc became Oneworld's 14th member on 1 April 2020.

In June 2023, the airline announced a substantial expansion plan with the goal of doubling the size of its fleet over the next decade and adding international connections with new routes to Europe. This plan was revealed by the RAM's chief executive officer (CEO), Abdelhamid Addou. In October, the airline announced plans to purchase 200 planes within a decade through a tender, aiming to meet the demand driven by the 2030 FIFA World Cup and strengthen its presence in the growing African market.

== Corporate affairs ==
=== Ownership and subsidiaries ===
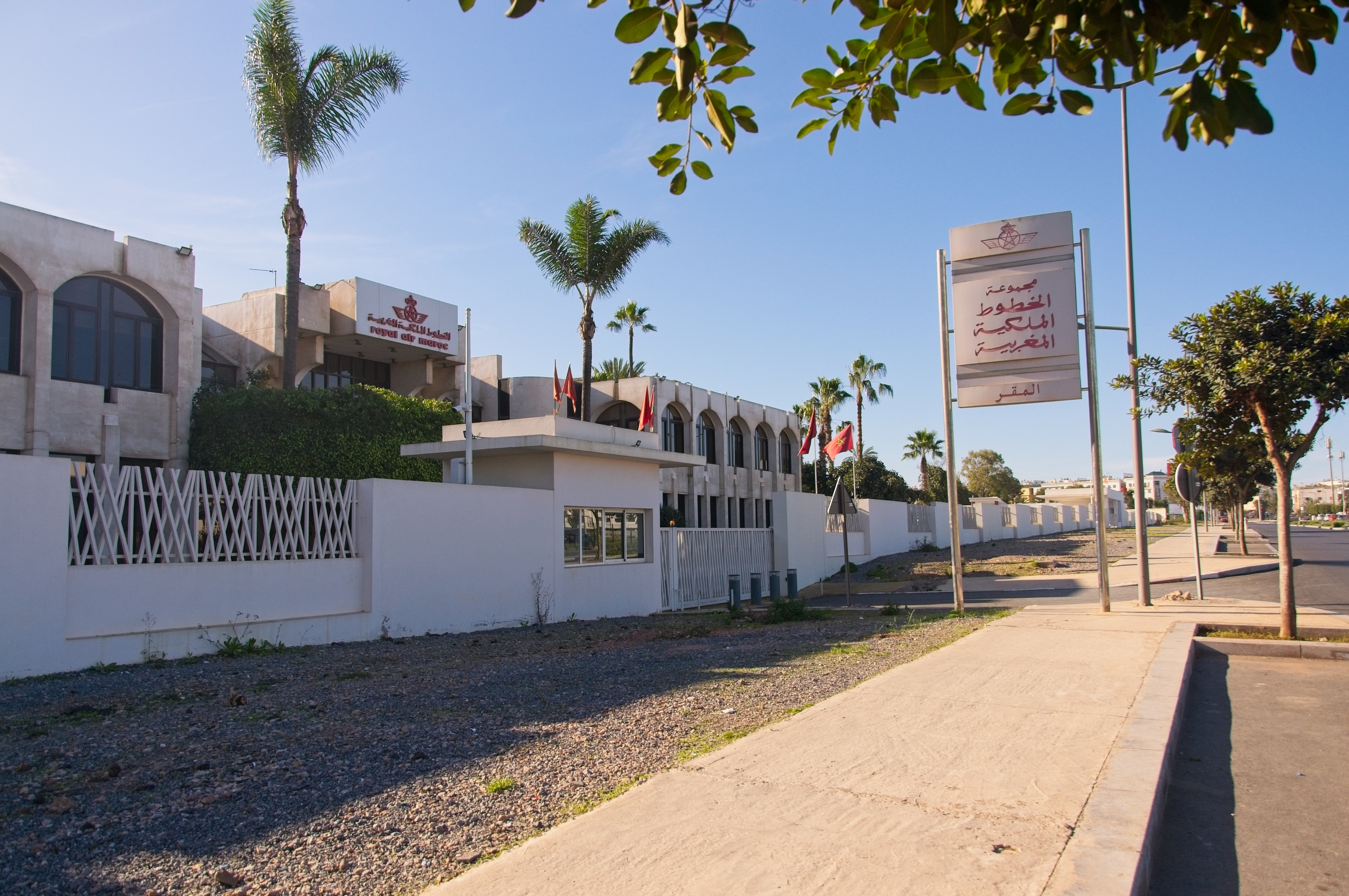
RAM head office at Casablanca Anfa Airport

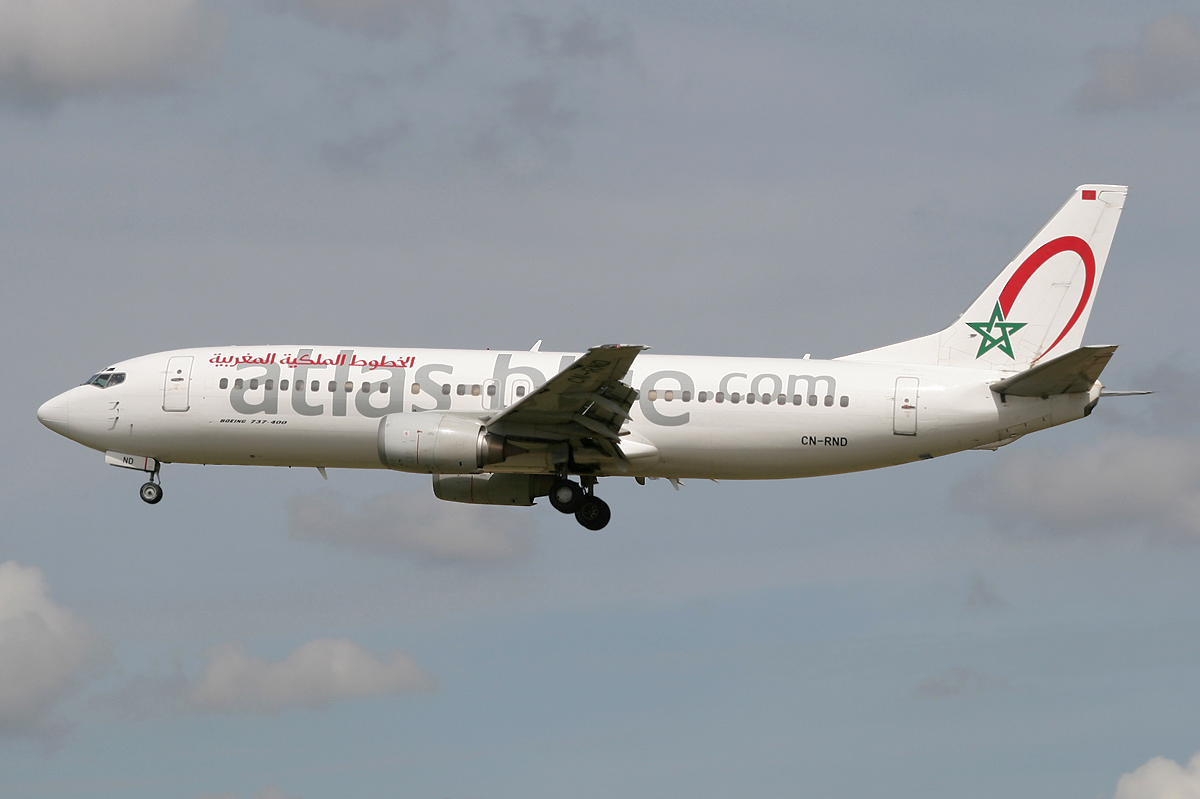
A Boeing 737-400 wearing a combined Royal Air Maroc/Atlas Blue livery in 2009. The Atlas Blue fleet was merged with the parent company's one in 2011.

As of 2018, the airline is owned by the Moroccan government; 53.94% of shares are owned directly by the state, an additional 44.10% are held via the Hassan II Fund for Economic and Social Development. The remaining 2% are owned by private investors including Air France and Iberia.

The government has considered the privatisation of the company for about 20 years; the latest plan, dating from late 2012, reportedly included selling up to 44% of the stakes to a Gulf airline.

As of December 2012, The Group Royal Air Maroc had the following subsidiaries:

- Royal Air Maroc
- RAM Cargo
- Royal Air Maroc Express
- Atlas Aérotechnic Industries
- RAM Academy

Former RAM subsidiaries include:

- Air Gabon International, formed in December 2005 as a joint venture between the State of Gabon and RAM, which held a controlling interest (51%). It intended to be the new Gabonese flag carrier.
- Air Sénégal International, created in 2000, had its maiden flight in 2001; the government of Senegal was the stockholder of 49% of the company and RAM held the balance at the time it ceased operations in April 2009.
- Amadeus Morocco
- Atlas Blue: RAM's fully owned low-cost subsidiary. It was created on 28 May 2004, and started operations in July the same year. Based in Marrakesh, it initially operated a single Boeing 737-400 that was transferred from its parent company and deployed on charter routes to France. Operations were integrated into RAM in 2009, while the fleets of both carriers officially merged on 10 February 2011.
- Atlas Catering Airlines Services
- Atlas Hospitality Morocco, a chain of hotels
- Matis, dedicated to the aircraft wiring industry

=== Business trends ===
The carrier achieved the best result in ten years for the fiscal year 2012; cost-cutting measures had included the reduction in the number of employees by 1,974 between June 2011 and October 2012 and a fleet renewal program, and the net loss for the same period was reduced to MAD43 million. Following restructuring, which included the removal of ten medium-haul aircraft, the staff-to-aircraft ratio decreased from 110:1 to 58:1, whereas the ratio of passengers transported per employee increased from 1,054:1 to 2,329:1. In 2019, Royal Air Maroc made a net profit of US$51.9 million.

Available figures are shown below (for years ending 30 October):

Business indicators from 2017
	2017	2018	2019	2020	2021	2022
Number of employees (Note: at year end)	2,273	2,282	2,328	1,966	3,075	3,089
Number of passengers (M)	7.3	7.3	7.4	2.2	3.4	5.6
Passenger load factor (%)	72	73	72	67	65	73
Destinations served	102	101	105	123	83	85
Freight carried (000 tonnes) (Note: the "(000)" in the AFRAA annual reports of 2021 and 2022 on the pages headlined "ANNEX 1: AFRAA member airlines performance" are not correct.)		27.8	30.3	13.8	13.9	21.7
Number of aircraft	56	62	61	59	59	50
Notes/sources						

Business indicators from 2008 - 2016
	2008	2009	2010	2011	2012	2013	2014	2015	2016
Turnover (MADm)					13,700		14,000	13,443	
Operating profit (MADm)	460	168	−492	−499	718	789	616	522	
Net profit (MADm)				−1,670	−43		184	203	520
Number of employees		5,364	4,181	5,018	3,892	2,778	2,175	3,010	2,263
Number of passengers (m)			6.1	5.8	5.6	5.8	6.3	6.1	6.8
Passenger load factor (%)			65.5			54.7	63	69	69
Destinations served		78					92	94	100
Freight carried (000 tonnes)						19.8	19.0	20.1	20.1
Number of aircraft		54	54	67	46	48	53	55	56
Notes/sources									

=== Key people ===
As of December 2025, Hamid Addou holds the CEO position.

=== Head office ===
Royal Air Maroc has its head office on the grounds of Casablanca-Anfa Airport in Casablanca. In 2004 the airline announced that it would move its head office from Casablanca to the Nouaceur Province, near Mohammed V International Airport. MAP, the official state news agency, said that the construction of the headquarters and a 500-room conference hotel would take 1 year and 6 months. The agreement to build the head office in Nouaceur was signed in 2009.

== Destinations ==
At December 2018, Royal Air Maroc served 94 destinations.

=== Codeshare agreements ===
Royal Air Maroc has codeshare agreements with the following airlines:

- Air Senegal
- Alaska Airlines
- American Airlines
- British Airways
- Egyptair
- Etihad Airways
- GOL
- Iberia
- ITA Airways
- JetBlue
- Kenya Airways
- Malaysia Airlines
- Mauritania Airlines
- Qatar Airways
- S7 Airlines

=== Frequent flyer programme ===
RAM's frequent flyer programme is called Safar Flyer. As of January 2013, cardholders can earn and redeem miles either by flying RAM, its direct subsidiaries, or its partner airlines Iberia, Etihad Airways and Qatar Airways; hotels and car rental companies offer benefits too.

== Fleet ==
=== Current fleet ===
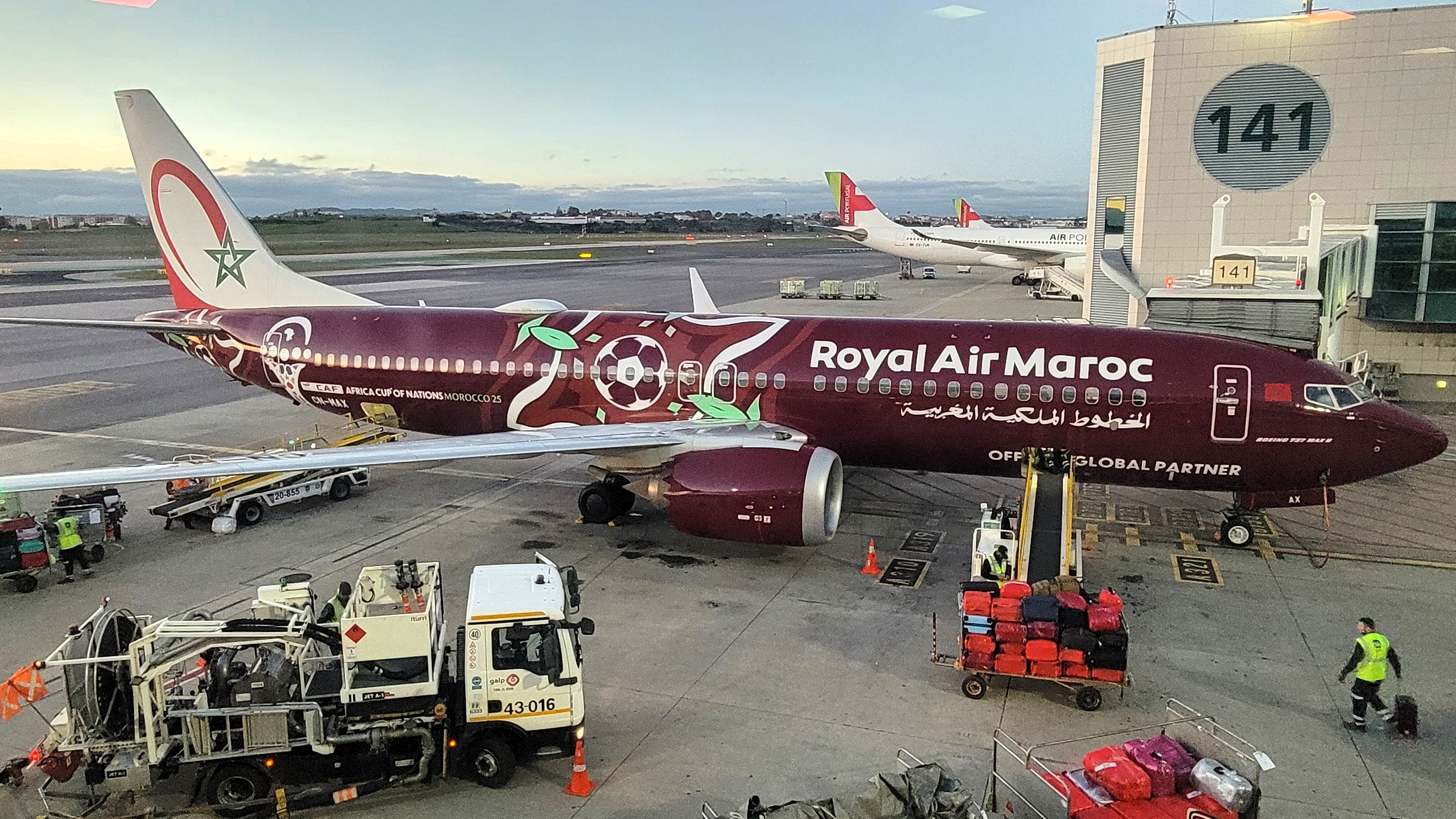
Royal Air Maroc Boeing 737 MAX 8 in 2025 Africa Cup of Nations livery.

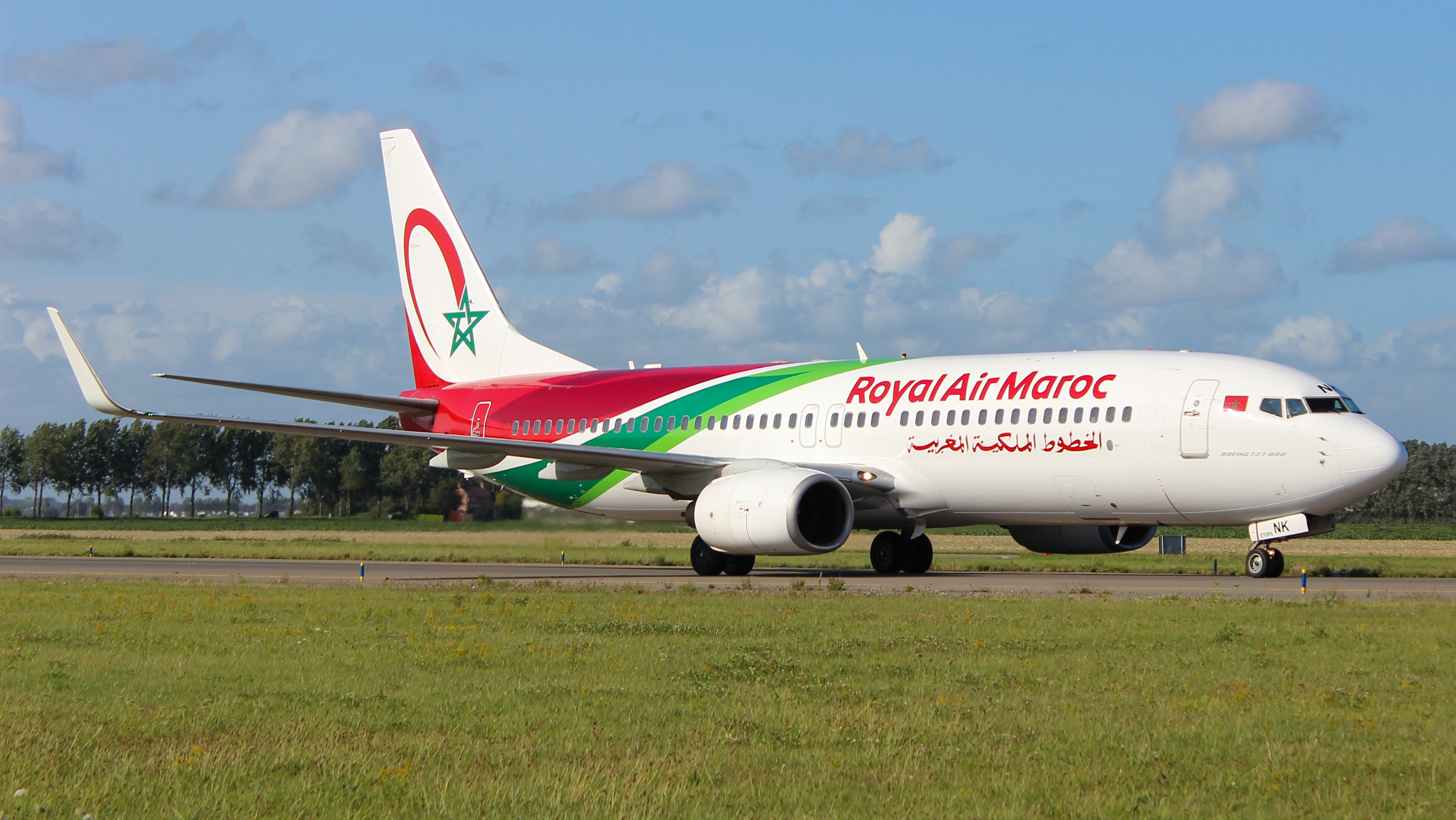
Royal Air Maroc Boeing 737-800.

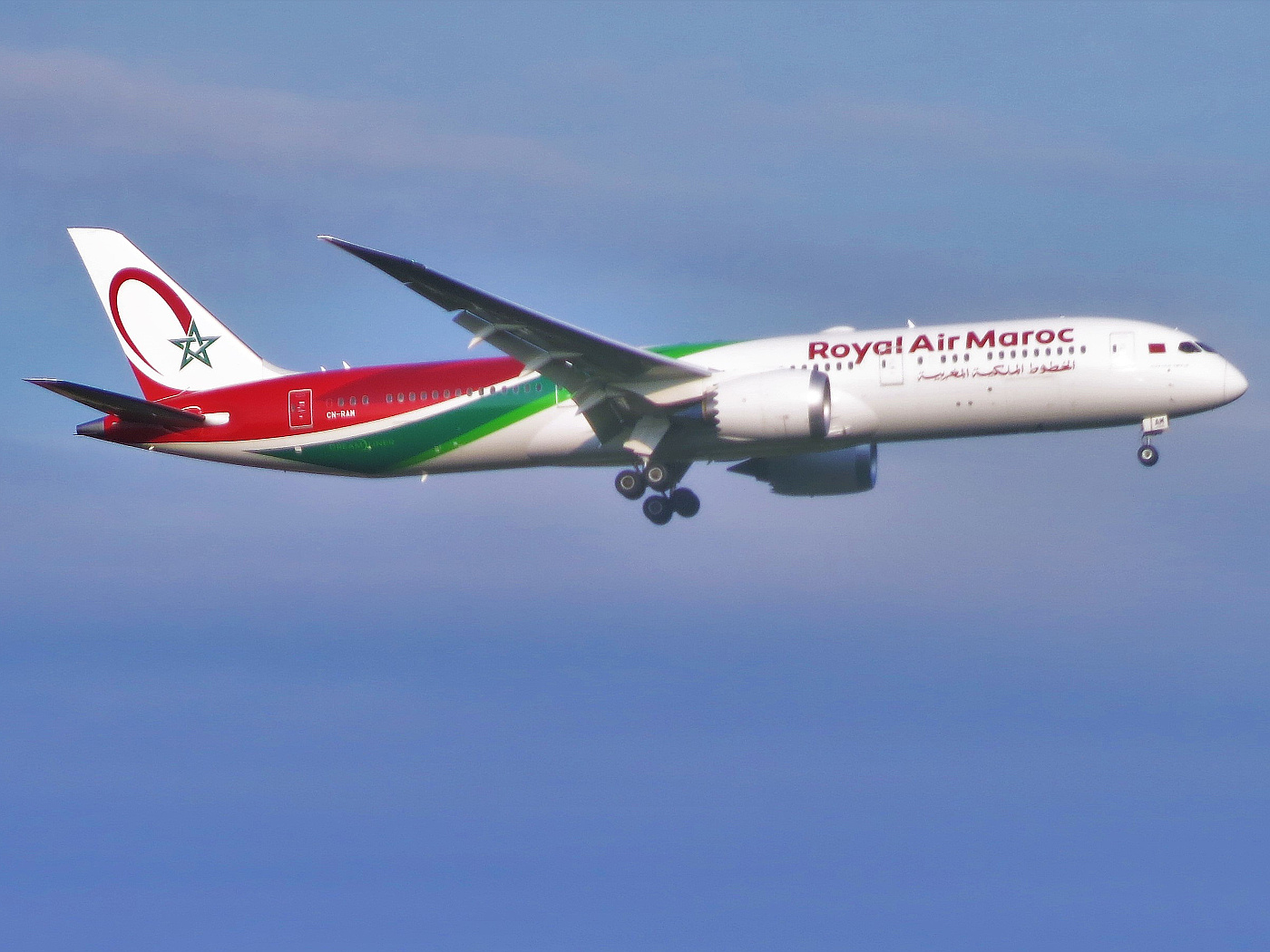
Royal Air Maroc Boeing 787-9.

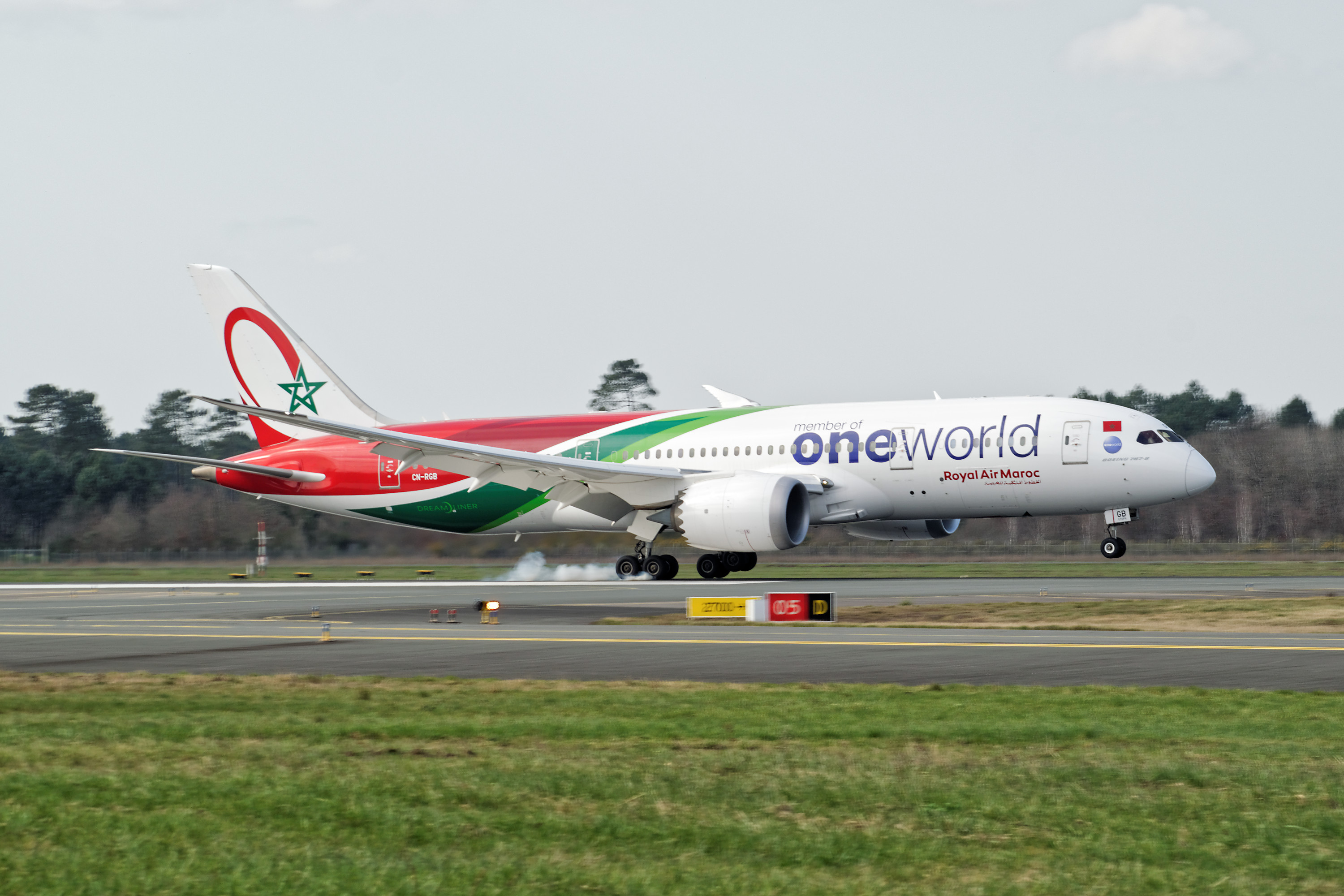
Royal Air Maroc Boeing 787-8 in Oneworld livery.

As of July 2025, the Royal Air Maroc fleet consists of the following aircraft:

Royal Air Maroc fleet
Aircraft	In service	Orders	Passengers		
Aircraft	In service	Orders	J	Y	Total
Boeing 737-800	27	—	12	147	159
Boeing 737 MAX 8	17	5	12	144	156
Boeing 787-8	7	—	18	256	274
Boeing 787-9	4	—	26	276	302
Boeing 787-9	2	—	16	304	320
Embraer E190	4	—	12	84	98
Total	61	5			

=== Recent developments ===
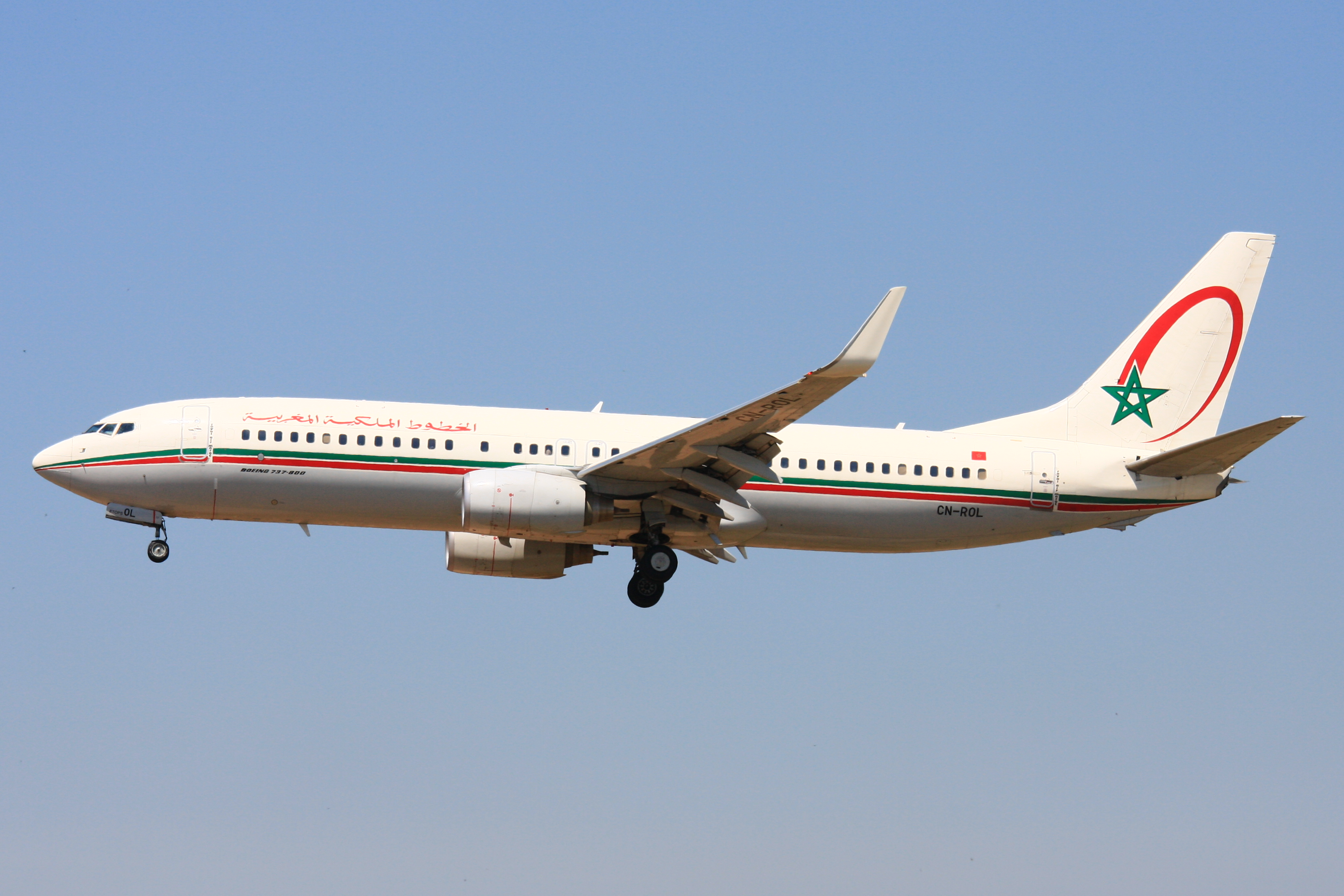
Royal Air Maroc Boeing 737-800 in the airline's previous livery.

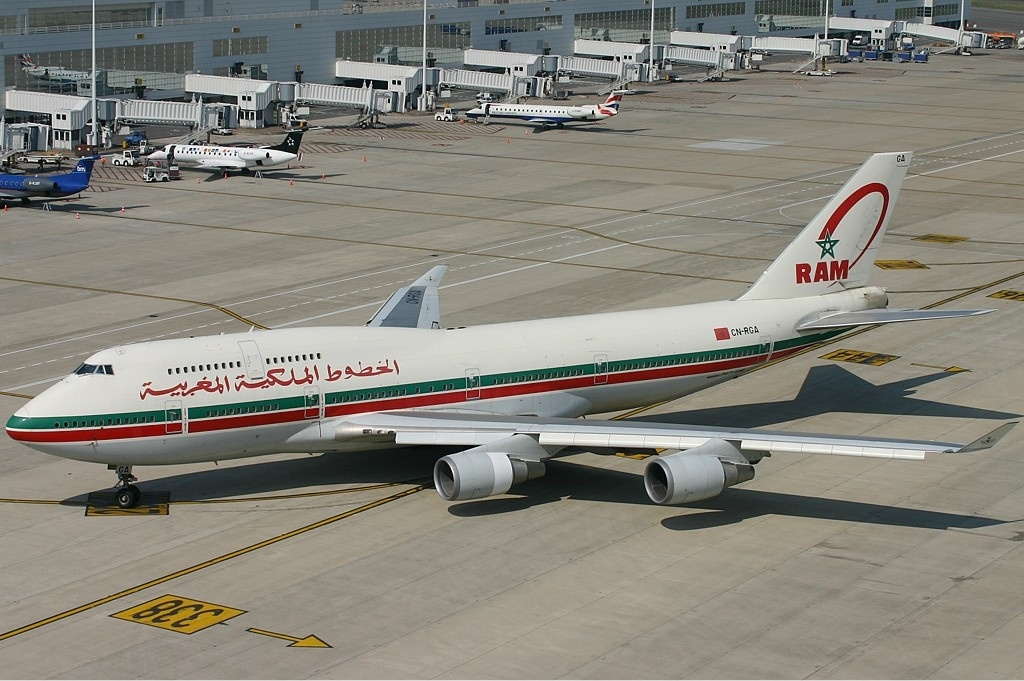
A former Royal Air Maroc Boeing 747-400.

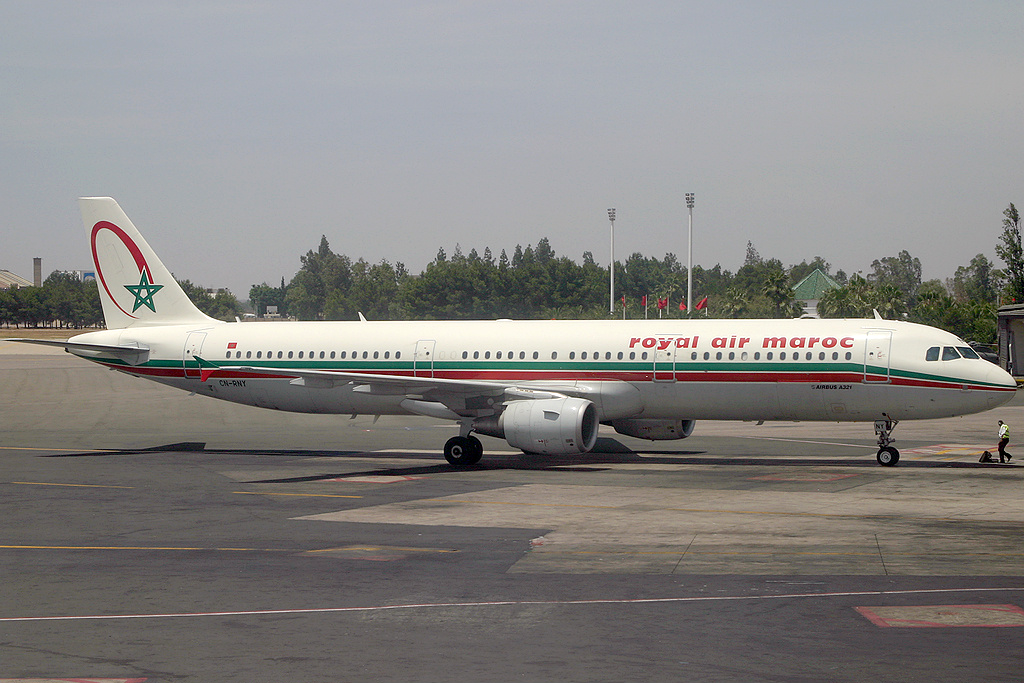
A former Royal Air Maroc Airbus A321-200.

As of March 2013, Royal Air Maroc (RAM) operated an all-Boeing fleet. RAM placed an order for nine Boeing 737 Next Generation in October 1996; the first of these aircraft the airline took possession of, in July 1998, was a Boeing 737-800, making the carrier the first scheduled one outside the United States to take delivery of this model. RAM received its first Boeing 737-700 in April 1999. In March 2001, RAM placed orders for 20 new Boeing 737NGs plus two wide-bodied Boeing 767-300ERs in a deal worth about US$1.4 billion. That same year, RAM became a new Airbus customer when it bought four Airbus A321s. In January 2002, the airline took delivery of its first Boeing 767-300ER.

After the carrier's Board of Directors agreed to buy a number of Boeing 787s on 29 July 2005, a memorandum of understanding for the acquisition of these aircraft was signed with Boeing on 31 Jul the same year. The deal, worth US$650 million and including five Dreamliners, was confirmed in early November that year, with initial delivery slated for October 2008. The purchase contract was signed in December 2005, and also included an aircraft of the type on option. Following an over-US$100 million-worth contract that was signed in February 2006, these aircraft will be powered with General Electric GEnx engines. Boeing delivered RAM's first Dreamliner in December 2014.

RAM was the launch customer for the ATR 72-600, when it took delivery of two of these aircraft, on behalf of its regional subsidiary RAM Express, in August 2011. The carrier had placed an order for four aircraft of the type in March 2009, along with two ATR 42-600s.

In September 2018, RAM retired its sole Boeing 747-400. In December 2018, RAM took delivery of its first Boeing 737 MAX 8 and Boeing 787-9.

In August 2023, RAM signed a $300 million long-term lease contract with Air Lease Corporation for five Boeing 737 aircraft, including four new Boeing 737 MAX 8s and one Boeing 737-800 which are expected to be delivered in 2024.

=== Future plans ===
In June 2013, RAM's CEO indicated that the airline was seeking new generation aircraft as a replacement for its ageing fleet, adding that the carrier will need some 20 to 30 new aircraft by 2020, and that the Boeing 787 was being considered for long-haul routes, whereas the Airbus A220, the Airbus A320neo, the Boeing 737 MAX, and Embraer E-Jet E2 families were all being considered for medium-haul flights. A contract for the lease of four Embraer E190s was signed in mid 2014; the carrier took delivery of the first of these aircraft in November the same year.

As of 2023, the airline Royal Air Maroc is preparing to launch a call for tenders for new single-aisle and wide-body aircraft, in order to respond to the increase in tourism and strengthen the role of Casablanca as a hub for sub-Saharan Africa. The airline's CEO declared on 13 June 2023 to the Bloomberg agency that RAM is “putting the final touches” to a call for tenders for the purchase of new long and medium-haul aircraft, and plans to raise debt to help finance these acquisitions.

=== Previously operated ===
Throughout its history, the carrier operated the following equipment:

- Airbus A310-300
- Airbus A321-200
- Airbus A330-200
- ATR 42-300
- Boeing 707-120B
- Boeing 707-320
- Boeing 707-320B
- Boeing 707-320C
- Boeing 720B
- Boeing 727-200
- Boeing 737-200
- Boeing 737-200C
- Boeing 737-300F
- Boeing 737-400
- Boeing 737-700
- Boeing 737-500
- Boeing 747-100
- Boeing 747-200B
- Boeing 747-300
- Boeing 747-400
- Boeing 747SP
- Boeing 757-200
- Boeing 767-300ER
- Britannia 300
- Caravelle III
- Caravelle VI-R
- Douglas C-47
- Douglas C-47A
- Embraer E190-100LR
- Douglas C-54A
- Douglas C-54B
- Fokker 100
- L-749 Constellation

== Incidents and accidents ==
=== Fatal accidents ===
- 1 April 1970: A Caravelle III, registration CN-CCV, flying the first leg of a scheduled Agadir–Casablanca–Paris flight, crashed on approach to Nouasseur Airport when control was lost at about 500 feet (150 m). Of the 82 people aboard, 61 perished.
- 22 December 1973: a leased Caravelle VIN, registration OO-SRD, on the first leg of a non-scheduled Paris–Tangier–Casablanca passenger service, crashed into mountainous terrain about 40 kilometres (25 mi) from Tangier Airport on approach. All 106 passengers and crew were killed.
- 3 August 1975: Royal Air Maroc leased a Boeing 707-321C (registration JY-AEE) from Jordanian World Airways and was operating a charter flight from Le Bourget Airport in Paris, France to Inezgane Airport in Agadir, Morocco. The aircraft approaching Agadir in poor visibility and not following a positive course, flew into the Atlas Mountains, killing all 181 passengers and 7 crew members on board.
- 21 August 1994: an ATR 42-300, registration CN-CDT, operating Flight 630 on a domestic Agadir-Casablanca route, entered a steep dive at 16,000 ft (4,900 m) and crashed into nearby mountains. Investigators concluded that the pilot deliberately disengaged the autopilot and directed the aircraft into the ground. All 44 passengers and crew died.

=== Non-fatal hull losses ===
- 14 November 1958: The undercarriage of a Douglas C-47A, registration CN-CCJ, collapsed on landing at Tangier Airport.
- 26 March 2003: The nosegear of a Boeing 737-400, registration CN-RNF, collapsed after landing at Oujda-Les Angades Airport.

== See also ==
- Transport in Morocco

== Bibliography ==
- Guttery, Ben R. (1998). Encyclopedia of African Airlines. Jefferson, NC: McFarland & Company. ISBN 0-7864-0495-7.
