= Casablanca–Agadir expressway =

Road in Morocco

A3 motorway

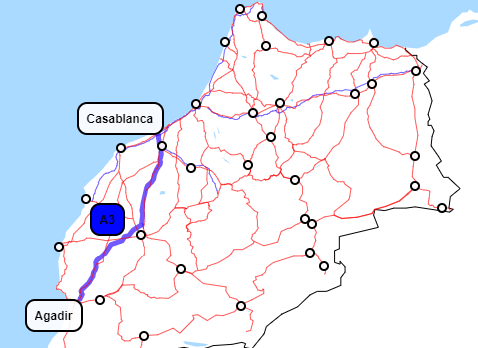

Route information
- Length: 429 km (267 mi)
- Existed: 2000–present
- History: Completed on 21 June 2010

Major junctions
- North end: Casablanca
- South end: Agadir

Location
- Country: Morocco

Highway system
- Transport in Morocco

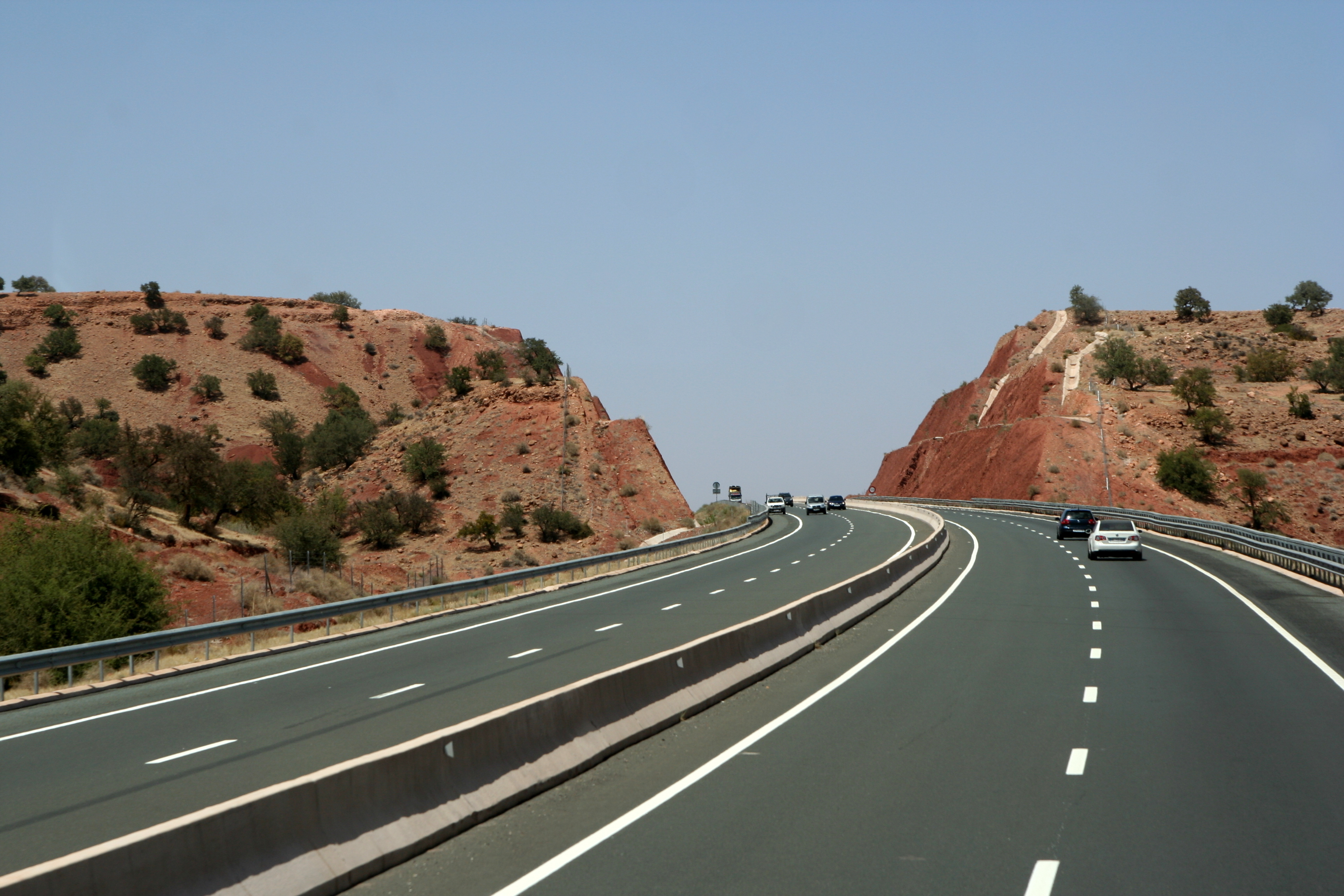
A3 motorway in Morocco

The Autoroute Casablanca–Agadir is a new main road in Morocco. Building began in 2000 and the road was inaugurated on 21 June 2010 by Prince Moulay Rachid.

The road is 429 km (267 mi) long and connects the cities of Casablanca and Agadir through the city of Marrakesh and High Atlas mountains.

== Casablanca–Marrakesh ==
It has been designated A3 as its identity marker. Total length is 210 km: 52 km Casablanca–Settat and 158 km Settat–Marrakesh, including A301.

The expressway takes its origins south of the residential area of Casablanca, at the interchange with the A1 Rabat-Safi expressway. It continues south past Bouskoura and serves the Mohamed V airport with an exit. A toll station is placed just south of there. The road then circumvales the town of Berrechid serving it with an exit north of it for south-bound traffic and one south of it for north-bound traffic.

The road was opened in 2002 to Settat, and construction on the remaining part started in 2003 reaching Marrakesh in 2007. In 2005 the 17 km bypass of Settat opened. When the Marrakesh–Agadir expressway opened in 2009 it was directly connected to this A3.

The Casablanca–Marrakesh highway was completed and opened to traffic on April 17, 2007.

Toll-revenues of this road, including the Casablanca bypass, totaled 219 million dirhams, reaching 3rd spot of top earners

== Marrakesh–Agadir ==
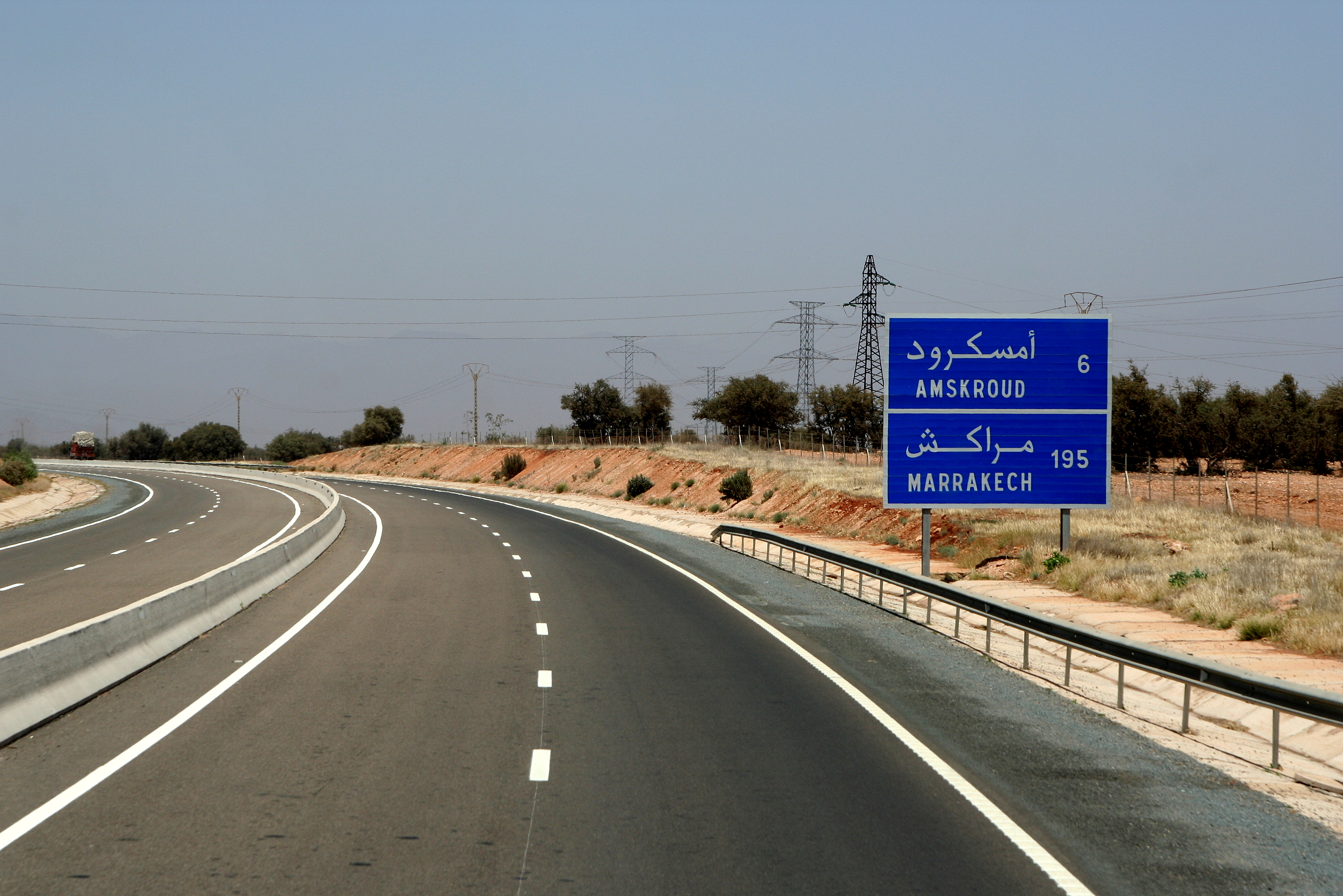
A3 motorway, Agadir-Marrakesh

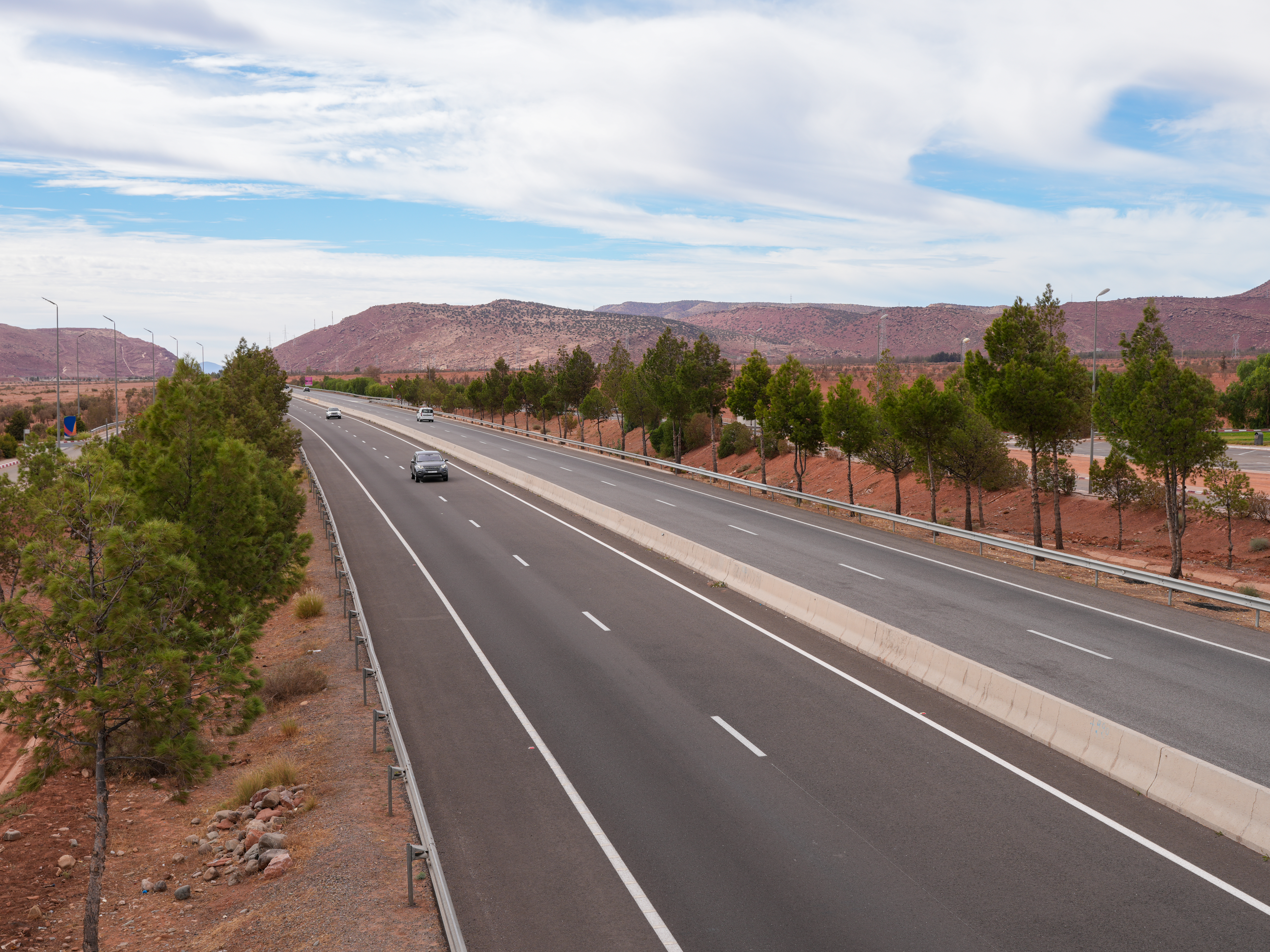
A3 motorway at the Imintanoute service area

=== Financial ===
In June 2004 the Moroccan operator of expressways ADM signed an agreement with the Hasan II Society for economic and social development for a refinancing scheme of the ADM. This financial injection made construction of new roads possible and construction started in 2006.

The road is a toll road or péage to pay back the investments.

Beside the ADM several other parties are involved. Some major investors participate in specific sections of the road or a general goal.

The main investors are (in million dirham)

- BID - Islamic Bank for Development - 965 MDH
- FADES -Arab Fund for social and economic development - 920
- FKDEA- Kuwait Fund for Arab and Economic Development - 450
- BAD - African Bank for Development - 1315
- JBIC- Japan Bank for International Cooperation - 1370

=== Overview ===
Below is a short overview of the different sub-projects, the costs (against the estimated costs) and the main contractors for that section. For some sections, only contractors for initial work are reported.

#	from	via	to	length	real and (est cost) in M Dh	contractors	from
1	Marrakesh	–	Marrakesh West; Interchange	33 km	583 (783)	El Hajji; Srfiani; The Arab Contractors	Morocco; Egypt
2	Marr. West Interchg.	-	Chichaoua	51 km	810 (1060)	Burhan	Kuwait
3	Chichaoua	–	Imintanoute	33 km	753 (975)	SEPROB; SNCE	Morocco
4	Imintanout	PK13	Argana	59 km	2125 (2644)	TECNOVIA; COVEC	Portugal; China
5	Argana	PK 20	Ameskroud	46 km	1754 (2132)	DOGUS	Turkey
6	Ameskroud	-	Agadir	11 km	287 (293)	Planum; Mostogradnja	Serbia

=== Construction ===
Work is divided into several main sections, each with their own contractors and workers. Construction of a 4-lane motorway through the mountains of the High Atlas requires many structures as fly-overs, viaducts and bridges. The existing national road (route nationale) is used for transportation of building material etc. Along this route, new exits and side roads are constructed to several main working locations and temporary factories (concrete, storage, camp-sites for builders, etc.).

The new road crosses the existing road several times and follows more or less the same route through the mountains.

==== Layout ====
Over the full length the new autoroute has:

- two standard traffic lanes in each direction, each 3.5 meters wide with a central separation zone of at least 3 meters
- one emergency lane / hard shoulder in each direction of 1.5 meters wide

The road has 8 exits/entries, 9 toll-port gates and 4 rest stops with petrol stations, cafés and a room or building for praying. Thirteen viaducts and one tunnel were built to complete the road (excluding viaducts built over the road and/or tunnels under the road for crossing inferior local roads or feet-bridges: if you include these another 100 structures can be included.

=== Toll road ===
As (nearly) all Moroccan expressways this new section is also a toll road.

The existing national road will remain open as a toll-free alternative for the autoroute as well as allowing access to smaller villages and roads. Traveling time between Marrakesh and Agadir will be reduced greatly as the autoroute allows overtaking everywhere (4 lane), bypasses villages and allows higher speeds. Possible speed on 2-lane national roads is often greatly reduced due to very slow lorries crawling up a hill while steep bends and traffic from the other side make overtaking hazardous or impossible.

The Marrakesh–Agadir section completes a north–south corridor of expressways that shortens the travel-distance on the route Tangier to Agadir by nearly 50 km (via toll-roads the distance is 776 and via the Route Nationale 824 km. But the biggest save is driving-time: the average travelling time Tangier–Agadir over national (free) roads is 14.5 hours while the same via the different toll-roads is under 7.5 hours

== Route ==
Exit	Distance	Direction	Roads
Junction between A3 and A1	km 0	حد الســوالــم الجـديـدة; Had Soualem; El Jadida	A1
Junction between A3 and A1	km 0	الـربــاط طـنـجـة وجــدة; Rabat; Tanger; Oujda	A1
32	2 kilometres (1.2 mi)	الـمـديـنـة الخـضـراء بــوسـكــورة; Ville Verte; Bouskoura	P3011
37	7 kilometres (4.3 mi)	بـوسـكـورة; Bouskoura	P3013
313	13 kilometres (8.1 mi)	مطـار محمد الـخامـس; Airport Mohammed V	P3038
Toll (Agadir - Casablanca direction)	15 kilometres (9.3 mi)	Nouaceur toll station	
Toll (Casablanca - Agadir direction); 321 (Casablanca - Agadir direction)	21 kilometres (13 mi)	Berrechid toll station شمـال بــرشـيــد; Berrechid North	N12
Junction between A3 and A4	25 kilometres (16 mi)	خـريـبــڭـة بــنـي مــلال; Khouribga; Béni Mellal	A4
Junction between A3 and Tit Mellil-Berrechid expressway (Agadir - Casablanca direction)	25 kilometres (16 mi)	Tit Mellil-Berrechid expressway under construction	
332	32 kilometres (20 mi)	جنوب بـرشـيــد خـريـبــڭـة بــنـي مــلال; Berrechid South; Khouribga; Béni Mellal	N12
	35 kilometres (22 mi)	Service area Berrechid	
352	52 kilometres (32 mi)	شمال سطات; Settat North	P3606
365	65 kilometres (40 mi)	وسط سطات البـــروج; Settat Center; El Borouj	R308
	75 kilometres (47 mi)	Service area Settat	
3104	104 kilometres (65 mi)	مــشــرع بن عــبــو; Machraa Ben Abbou	P3503
Oued	106 kilometres (66 mi)	Oued Oum Rbia	
	107 kilometres (66 mi)	Service area Oum Rbia	
3127	127 kilometres (79 mi)	صخور الرحامنة; Skhour Rhamna	N9
	154 kilometres (96 mi)	Service area Ben Guerir	
3160	160 kilometres (99 mi)	ابـن جــريــر الــيــوسفـيـة قـلـعـة الـسـراغـنـة; Ben Guerir; Youssoufia; El Kelaa des Sraghna	R206
(Casablanca - Agadir direction)	194 kilometres (121 mi)	Rest area Sidi Bou Othmane	
(Agadir - Casablanca direction)	194 kilometres (121 mi)	Service area Sidi Bou Othmane	
Junction between A3 and A301	198 kilometres (123 mi)	مــراكـش الـنخـيـل; Marrakesh Palmeraie	A301
3214	214 kilometres (133 mi)	مــراكـش تامنصورت آســـفـــي الـجـديــدة; Marrakesh Tamansourt; Safi; El Jadida	N7
	228 kilometres (142 mi)	Service area Marrakesh	
3232	232 kilometres (144 mi)	مــراكـش تـارڭـة; Marrakesh Targa	P2006
3248	248 kilometres (154 mi)	مـراكـــــش الاوداية سـيدي الــزويــن; Marrakesh Loudaya; Sidi Zouine	N8
	km 279	Service area Chichaoua	
3282	282 kilometres (175 mi)	شــيــشـاوة الــصـويــرة عبر الطريق السريع; Chichaoua; Essaouira per toll-free expressway	N8
3310	310 kilometres (190 mi)	إيـمـنـتانـوت; Imintanoute	N11
Tunnel	325 kilometres (202 mi)	Zaouiat Ait Mellal tunnel	
	345 kilometres (214 mi)	Service area Imintanoute	
3370	370 kilometres (230 mi)	أرڭـانـة; Argana	N11 P1713
(Casablanca - Agadir direction)	406 kilometres (252 mi)	Service area	
Toll	419 kilometres (260 mi)	Amskroud toll station	
3420	420 kilometres (260 mi)	أمسـكــرود تـارودانــت; Amskroud; Taroudannt	N11 R114A
	424 kilometres (263 mi)	Service area Amskroud	
Junction between A3 and N11A; End of expressway	429 kilometres (267 mi)	أڭــاديــر; Agadir	N11A N1

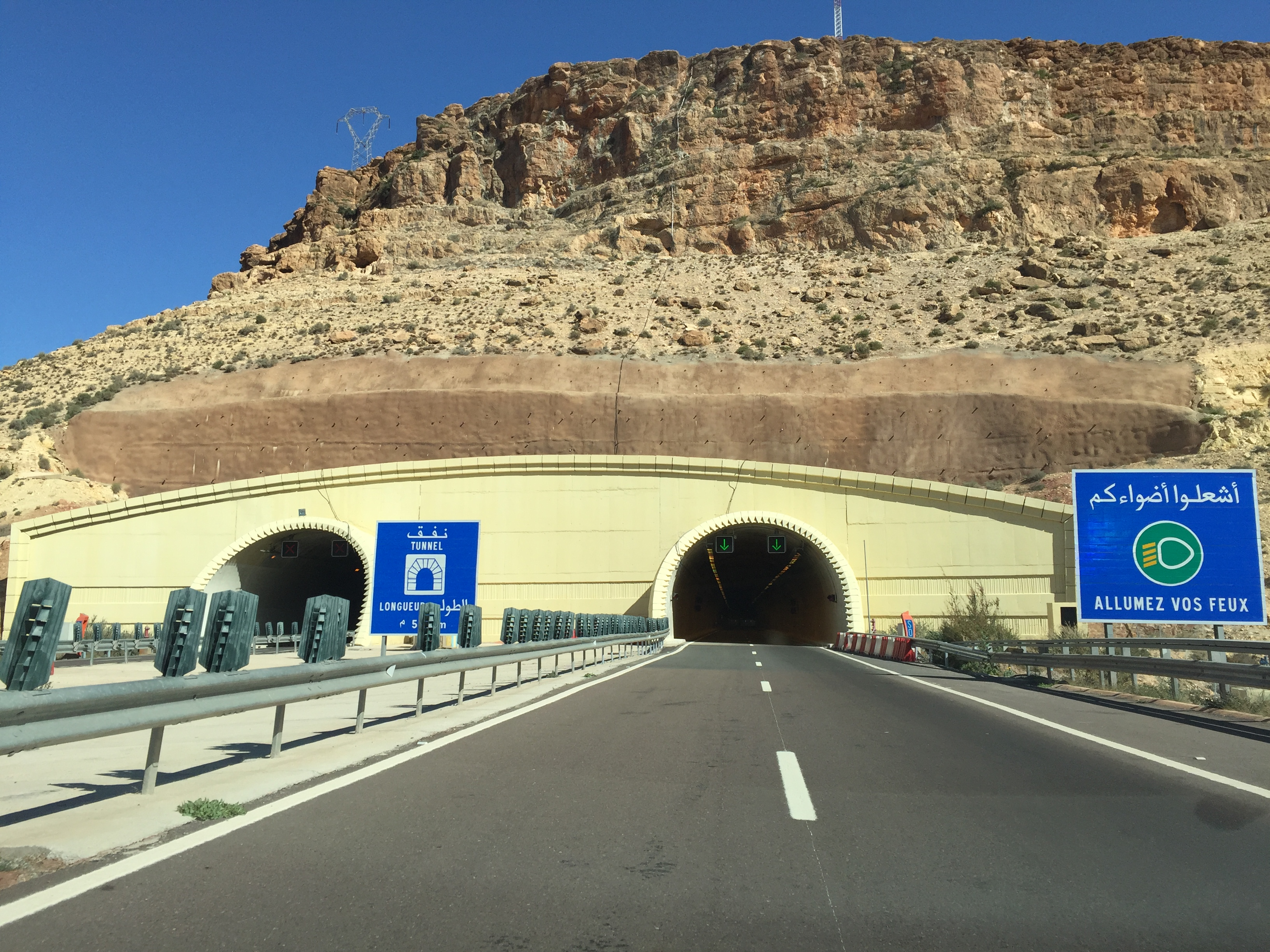
Zaouiat Aït Mellal Tunnel
