= Berrechid–Beni Mellal expressway =

Expressway in Morocco

A4 motorway

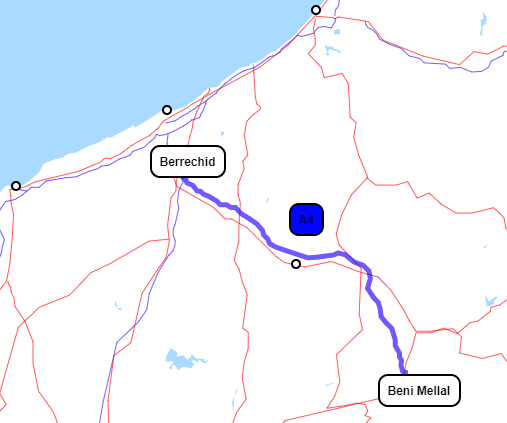

Route information
- Length: 173 km (107 mi)
- Existed: 2014–present

Major junctions
- West end: Berrechid
- East end: Beni Mellal

Location
- Country: Morocco

Highway system
- Transport in Morocco

The Berrechid–Beni Mellal expressway (A4) was inaugurated in 2015. It runs mainly parallel with the existing Route Nationale 12.

== History ==
=== Start of building ===
On 12 April 2010 King Mohammed VI of Morocco formally started the building-activities for this 173 km (107 mi) long toll-road. Between this date and the opening in 2015, some 35 billion cubic metres (1,200×10^{9} ft^{3}) of soil/ground were moved.

=== Financing ===
The total building costs are budgeted on 6.050 million Dirham and these investments are made via: FADES: The Arab Fund for Social and Economical Development,
the European Investment Bank and the government of China. This investment will be retrieved via the income from the toll-road, the exploration of the rest- and service stations. Three service-stops will be built lying max. 52 km (32 mi). apart from each other. The five parts were meant to be built at the same time so that the whole road can be opened for traffic in 2013. However, due to expropriation issues, Khouribga - Beni Mellal section opened in 2014 and the inauguration of Berrechid - Khouribga section was postponed to 2015.

This investment is part of the main-project plan 2008–2015 between the ADM and the government of Morocco. This masterplan was signed on 8 July 2008 during a formal meeting which was attended by King Mohammed VI of Morocco.

=== Construction ===
The first section between Berrechid and Ben Ahmed (38.6 kilometres (24.0 mi)) was built by China International Water & Electric Corporation (CWE). The second section, between Ben Ahmed and Khouribga (38.5 kilometres (23.9 mi)), and the third section between Khouribga and Oued Zem (33 kilometres (21 mi)), were built by four local Moroccan contractors: Sintram, LRN, Seprob and the SNCE. The fourth one between Oued Zem and Kasba Tadla (40 kilometres (25 mi)) was built by a Moroccan contractor, Houar. The fifth and last one, between Kasba Tadla and Beni Mellal ( 22 kilometres (14 mi)) was by another Chinese contractor, Covec.

== Purpose ==
This expressway aims to support the development of Béni Mellal-Khénifra region and to reduce road traffic on the National road 11. This expressway links Beni Mellal, capital of Béni Mellal-Khénifra region, to Casablanca, the economic capital and the largest city in Morocco, serving the province of Khouribga, an area of great industrial potential thanks to large phosphate reserves. The Béni Mellal-Khénifra region's agricultural and tourism sectors are also expected to benefit from this expressway.

With traffic estimated at 3,700 vehicles per day (2018), the expressway serves the cities of Ben Ahmed, Khouribga, Oued Zem, Bejaad and Kasba Tadla. It includes 7 junction and 3 bridges across the Oum Errabiaa, Oued Derna and Oued Oum Errabia Bouqroum rivers as well as 28 underground and aerial passages.

== Route ==
The total length of the new expressway from Berrechid to Beni Mellal is 174 km (108 mi).

Exit	Kilometer	Direction	Route
Junction between A3, A4 and Tit Mellil-Berrechid expressway	km 0	بــرشــيــد مــراكــــش أڭـــاديـــر; Berrechid; Marrakesh; Agadir	A3
Junction between A3, A4 and Tit Mellil-Berrechid expressway	km 0	مطــار محمد الخامس الدار البيضــاء; Airport Mohammed V Casablanca	A3
Junction between A3, A4 and Tit Mellil-Berrechid expressway	km 0	Tit Mellil-Berrechid expressway under construction	
	16 kilometres (9.9 mi)	Service area Ben Ahmed	
438	38 kilometres (24 mi)	بـن أحـمـد الــڭـارة الـبـــروج; Ben Ahmed; El Gara; El Borouj	N23
	72 kilometres (45 mi)	Service area Khouribga	
477	77 kilometres (48 mi)	خريــبــڭــة; Khouribga	R403
4107	107 kilometres (66 mi)	وادي زم الرماني عبـر ط و 25; Oued Zem; Rommani per N25	N25
4117	117 kilometres (73 mi)	وادي زم عبر ط و 12 أبـي الجعد عبر ط و 12; Oued Zem per N12; Bejaad per N12	N12
	119 kilometres (74 mi)	Service area Oued Zem	
4135	135 kilometres (84 mi)	أبــي الــجعـد الفـقيه بـن صالح عبر ط ج 310; Bejaad; Fkih Ben Saleh per R310	R310
4152	152 kilometres (94 mi)	قـصـبـة تـادلة خـنـيـفـرة; Kasba Tadla; Khénifra	R308
Toll	173 kilometres (107 mi)	Beni Mellal toll station	
Junction between A4 and N8; End of expressway	174 kilometres (108 mi)	بـنـي مـلال; Béni Mellal	N8

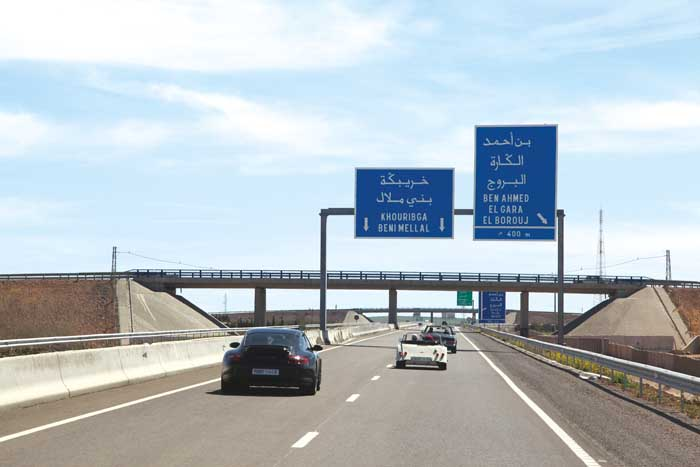
Ben Ahmed exit on the A4
