= Casablanca–Marrakesh expressway =

Road in Morocco

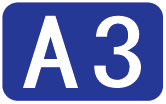
A3 motorway

Route information
- Length: 220 km (140 mi)
- Existed: 2000–present
- History: Completed in

Major junctions
- North end: Casablanca
- Casablanca-Rabat expressway A1
- South end: Agadir

Location
- Country: Morocco

Highway system
- Transport in Morocco

The Casablanca–Marrakesh (or Marrakech) expressway is an expressway in Morocco. It has been designated A3 as its identity marker. Total length is 220 km: 17 km Casablanca bypass, 57 km Casablanca-Settat and 146 km Settat-Marrakesh

The expressway takes its origins south of the residential area of Casablanca, at the interchange with the A1 Casablanca bypass. It continues south past Bouskoura and serves the Mohamed V airport with an exit. A toll station is placed just south of there. The road then circumvales the town of Berrechid serving it with an exit north of it for south-bound traffic and one south of it for north-bound traffic.

The road was opened in 2002 to Settat, and construction on the remaining part started in 2003 reaching Marrakesh in 2007. In 2005 the 17 km bypass of Settat opened. When the Casablanca–Agadir expressway opened in 2009 it was directly connected to this A3.

The Casablanca-Marrakesh highway was completed and opened to traffic on April 17, 2007.

Toll-revenues of this road, including the Casablanca bypass, totaled 219 million dirhams, reaching 3rd spot of top earners.
