= Transport in Morocco =

There are around 56,986 km (35,409 mi) of roads (national, regional and provincial) in Morocco. In addition to 1,808 km (1,123 mi) of highways (August 2016).

The Tangier–Casablanca high-speed rail link marks the first stage of the ONCF's high-speed rail master plan, pursuant to which over 1,500 km (930 mi) of new railway lines will be built by 2035. The high speed train - TGV - will have a capacity of 500 passengers and will carry 8 million passengers per year. The work on the High Speed Rail project was started in September 2011. Construction of infrastructure and delivery of railway equipment will end in 2014 and the HSR will be operational by December 2015.

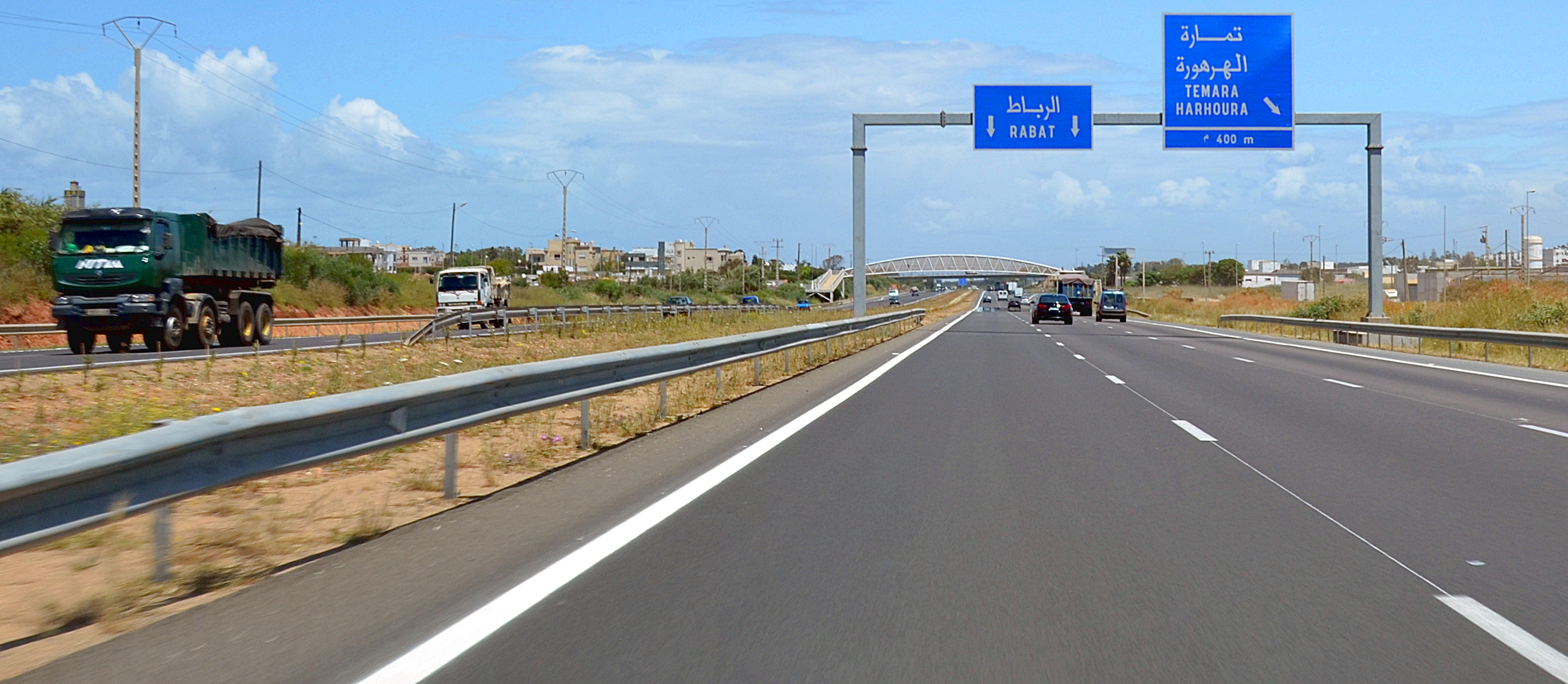
Autoroute A1 (Rabat–Casablanca, 95 km)

== Government policy ==
With billions of dollars committed to improving the country's infrastructure, Morocco aims to become a world player in terms of marine transport. The 2008–2012 investment plan aims to invest $16.3 billion and will contribute to major projects such as the combined port and industrial complex of the Tanger-Med and the construction of a high-speed train between Tangier and Casablanca. The plan will also improve and expand the existing highway system and expand the Casablanca Mohammed V International Airport. Morocco's transport sector is one of the kingdom's most dynamic, and will remain so for years to come. The improvements in infrastructure will boost other sectors and will also help the country in its goal of attracting 10 million tourists by 2010.

== Railways ==
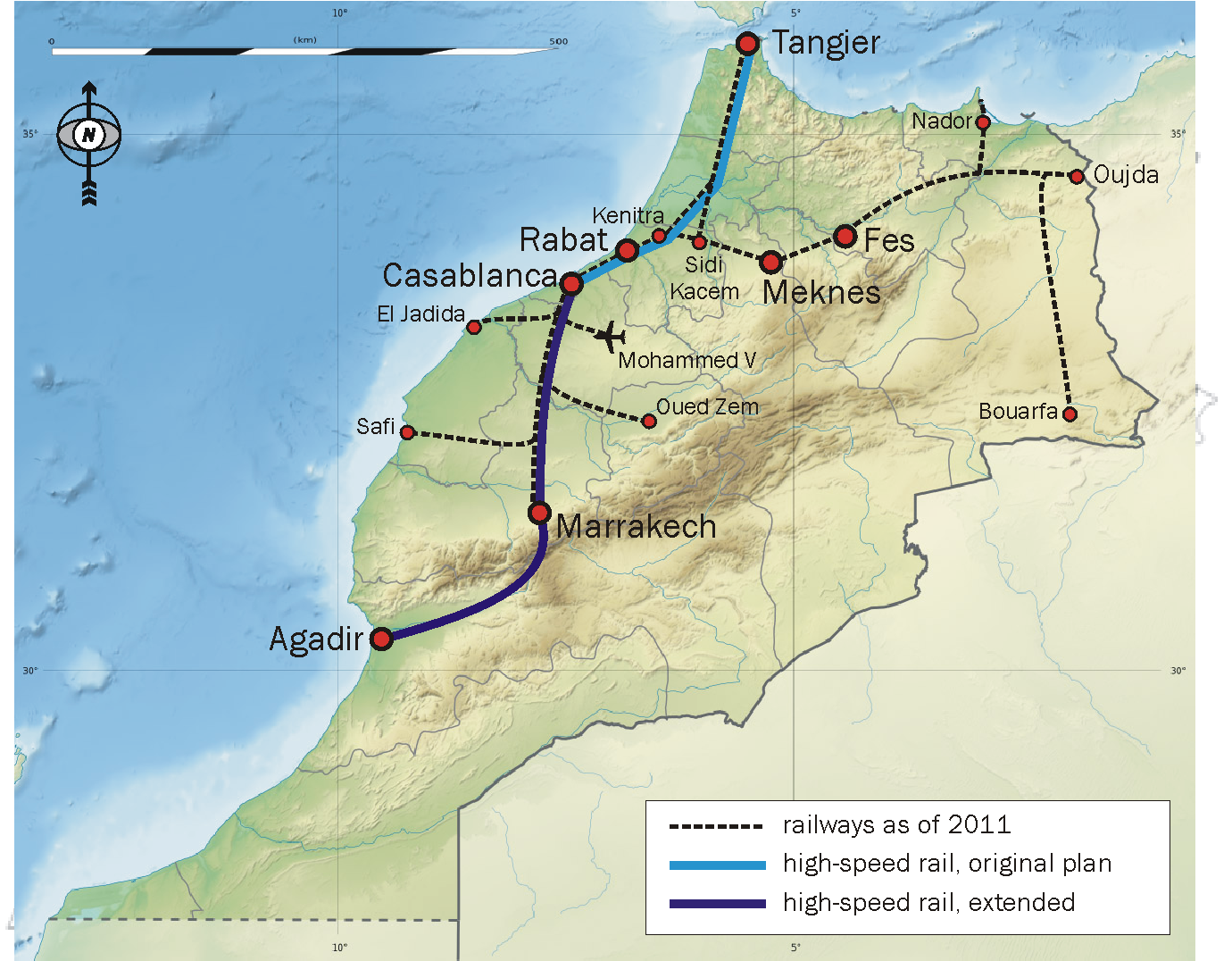
Railways of Morocco, with planned high-speed lines

1907 km 1,435 mm (4 ft 8 1/2 in) standard gauge, 1003 km electrified with 3 kV DC.

=== High speed lines ===
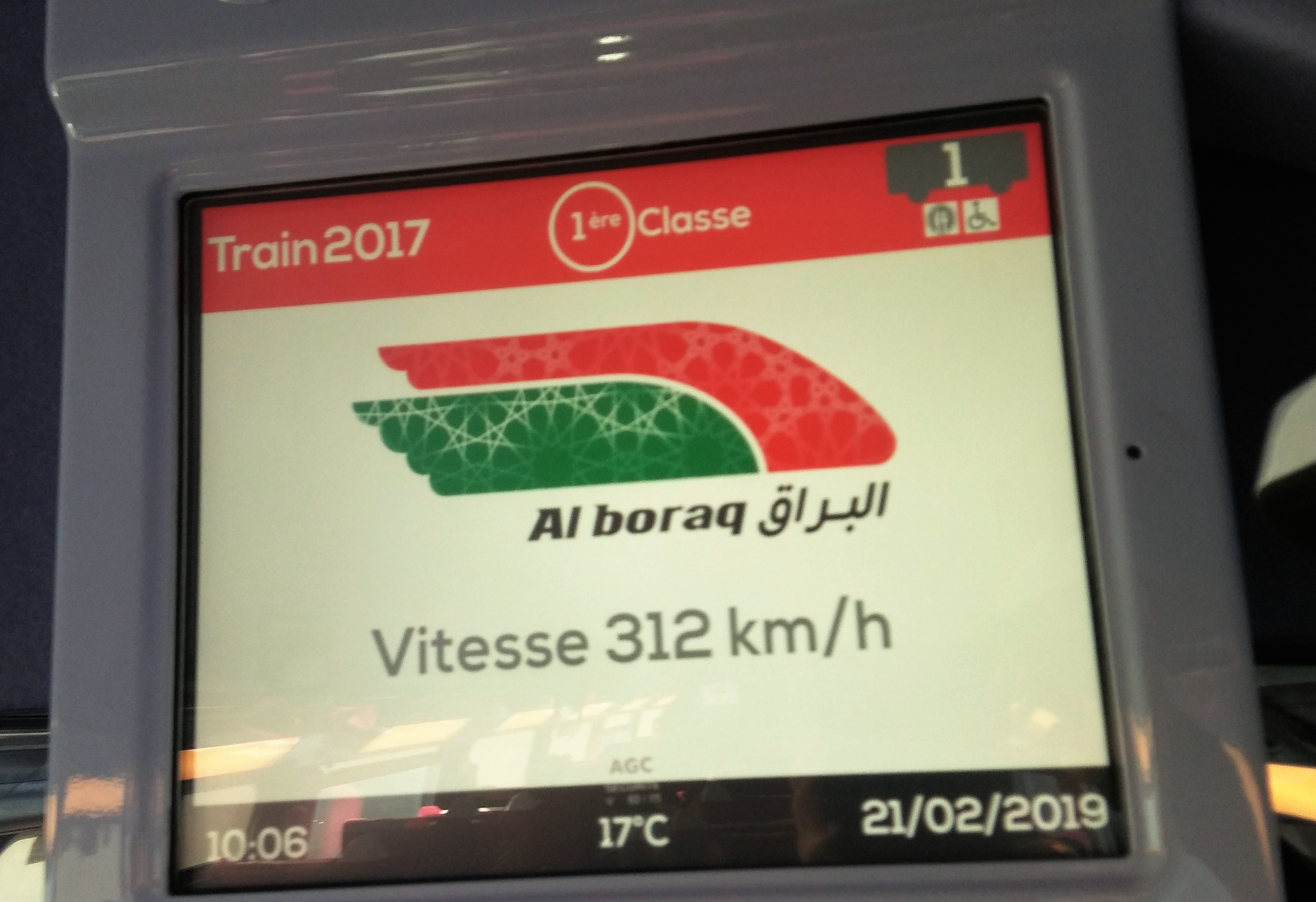
An on-board train speed reading 312 km/h on high-speed line, 2019

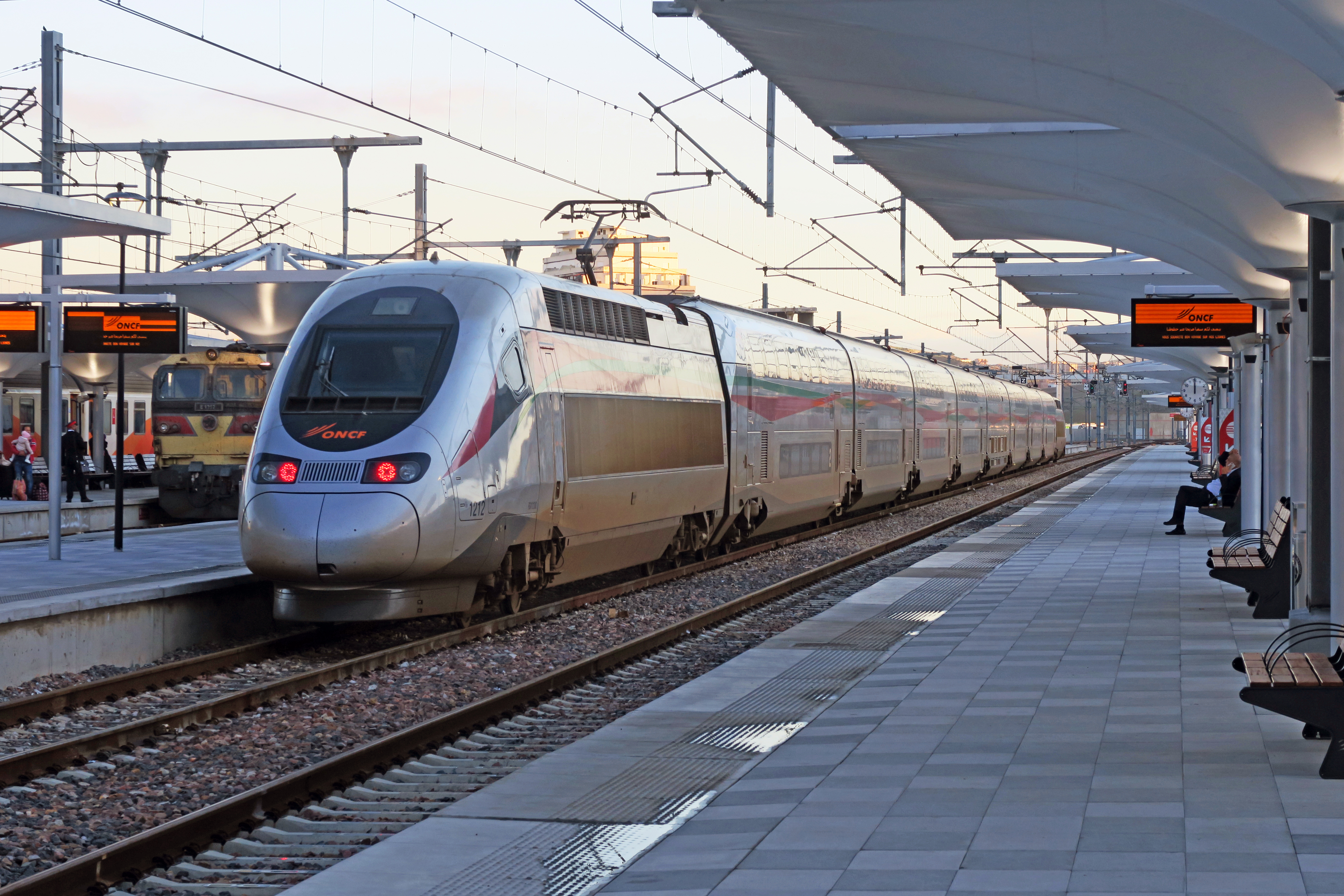
An ONCF Al Boraq Alstom RGV2N2 high-speed train, Tanger-Ville railway station, November 2018

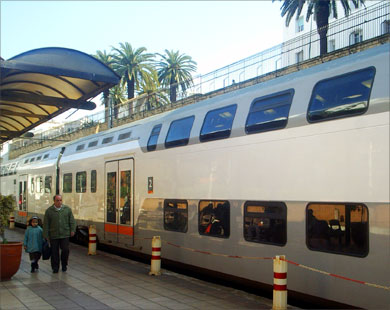
Train of Morocco.

Morocco has one high-speed line with plans for several additional high-speed lines extensions.

Since 2018, the first high-speed rail line connects Casablanca and Tangier. This line is the first of its kind on the African continent. The line was inaugurated on 15 November 2018, by King Mohammed VI of Morocco. It is called Al Boraq (البُراق) in reference to the mythical creature that transported the Islamic prophets. On 26 November 2018, it was launched. This high-speed line allows a 323-kilometer-long (201 mi) high-speed rail service. The service is operated by the ONCF.

The high-speed line required over a decade of planning and construction. Work by ONCF began in September 2011 on a first section from Tangier to Kenitra.

The current high-speed line Tangier-Kenitra under construction was impacted by delays resulting from issues about land acquisitions because this operation was performed by different provincial governors, in order to avoid such delays on the next high-speed rail Marrakech-Essaouira, the national railway company ONCF was given the green light to start the land acquisition and expropriation procedure.

==== Proposed high speed extensions ====
There are plans for extensions on two core lines: a first one from Tangier in the north via Marrakesh to Agadir in the south, and a second 600-km east-west line from Casablanca on the Atlantic to Oujda on the Algerian border (dubbed the "Maghreb Line"),. If all of these plans are approved, building the 1,500 km of tracks may last until 2035 to complete at a cost of around 100 billion dirhams ($10 billion).

The high-speed rail is expected to drastically shorten times between major Moroccan cities. Travel time from Casablanca to Marrakesh will drop from 3 hours to 1 hour and 20 minutes, and from the capital Rabat to Tangier from 4.5 hours to 1.5 hours.

The second High-Speed Rail (HSR) line planned after Tangier-Kenitra section is the HSR Marrakech-Essaouira line (180 km) followed by a new HSR Rabat-Meknes line (130 km). The last high-speed lines will connect these two former imperial cities to the Atlantic coast in less than one hour compared to the two hours currently needed.

In December 2024, Morocco secured $14 billion in investments to expand Morocco's high speed rail. The goal of the project is to increase the high speed rail network of 320 km to over 1,280 km by 2040, this would significantly enhance the country's connectivity, reduce travel times, and contribute to a greener, more sustainable transport system.

The high-speed rail linking Kenitra to Marrakech via Casablanca's Mohammed V Airport is currently under construction. Completion is intended for 2029 to precede Morocco's co-hosting of the 2030 World Cup and the accommodate the expected influx of visitors attending matches. Journeys to Marrakech will only take 2 hours and 45 minutes, compared from 7 hours. Another line connecting Marrakech to Agadir could be ready as soon as mid-2025.

=== Other routes ===
A railway connecting Nador to the existing network at Taourirt was finished in 2010, after it had been under construction since 2007.

== Tramways ==
- Rabat-Salé tramway (2011)
- Casablanca Tramway (2012)

== Roads ==
As of 2006 there were around 57625 kilometres of roads (national, regional and provincial) in Morocco, and an additional 1808 kilometers of highways (August 2016).

Principal national roads:

- National Route 1 (Morocco)
- National Route 2 (Morocco)
- National Route 3 (Morocco)
- National Route 4 (Morocco)
- National Route 5 (Morocco)
- National Route 6 (Morocco)
- National Route 7 (Morocco)
- National Route 8 (Morocco)
- National Route 9 (Morocco)
- National Route 10 (Morocco)
- National Route 11 (Morocco)
- National Route 12 (Morocco)
- National Route 13 (Morocco)
- National Route 14 (Morocco)
- National Route 15 (Morocco)
- National Route 16 (Morocco)

=== Highways ===
- Rabat Ring Road (42 km)
- A1 Casablanca-Rabat (86 km)
- A1 Casablanca–Safi (255 km)
- A2 Rabat-Fes (190 km)
- A2 Fes-Oujda (306 km)
- A3 Casablanca-Marrakesh (220 km)
- A3 extension to Agadir (233 km)
- A4 Berrechid-Benni Mellal (172 km)
- A5 Rabat-Tangier Med (308 km)
- A7 Tetouan-Fnideq (28 km)

== Major airports ==
- Agadir -- Agadir Al Massira Airport: (AGA) Flights to most major European cities.
- Al Hoceima -- Cherif Al Idrissi Airport: (AHU) Flights to Brussels, Amsterdam and Rotterdam
- Casablanca -- Mohammed V International Airport: (CMN) Royal Air Maroc hub. Arrivals and departures to worldwide destinations.
- Essaouira -- Essaouira Mogador Airport: (ESU) Flights to Brussels, Bordeaux, London, Paris, Madrid and Marseille.
- Fez -- Fes Saïss Airport: (FEZ) Flights to Europe and Casablanca
- Laayoune -- Hassan I Airport: (EUN) Flights to Agadir, Casablanca, Dakhla and Las Palmas.
- Marrakesh -- Marrakesh Menara Airport: (RAK) Flights all major international airports in Western Europe
- Nador -- Nador International Airport: (NDR) Flights to Amsterdam, Brussels, Casablanca, Cologne, Düsseldorf and Paris.
- Oujda -- Angads Airport: (OUD) Flights to Amsterdam, Casablanca, Marseille and Paris.
- Ouarzazate -- Ouarzazate Airport: (OZZ) Flights to Casablanca and Paris.
- Rabat -- Rabat–Salé Airport: (RBA) Flights to Paris, Brussels, Barcelona, London, Madrid, Rome, Düsseldorf, Toulouse, Marseille and Seville.
- Tangier -- Tangier Ibn Battouta Airport: (TNG) Flights all major international airports in Western Europe
- Tetouan -- Tetouan Saniat Rmel Airport: (TTU) Flights to Brussels, Malaga, Seville, Madrid, Al Hoceima and Casablanca.

== National airlines ==
- Air Arabia Maroc
- Royal Air Maroc
- Royal Air Maroc Express

== Merchant marine ==
Total: 35 ships (1,000 GT or over) by type:

- cargo ship 3,
- chemical tanker 6,
- container ship 8,
- passenger/cargo ship 12,
- petroleum tanker 1,
- refrigerated cargo ship 1,
- roll-on/roll-off 4

Foreign-owned: 14 (France 13, Germany 1) (2007)

- Registered in other countries: 4 (Gibraltar)

== Maritime companies ==
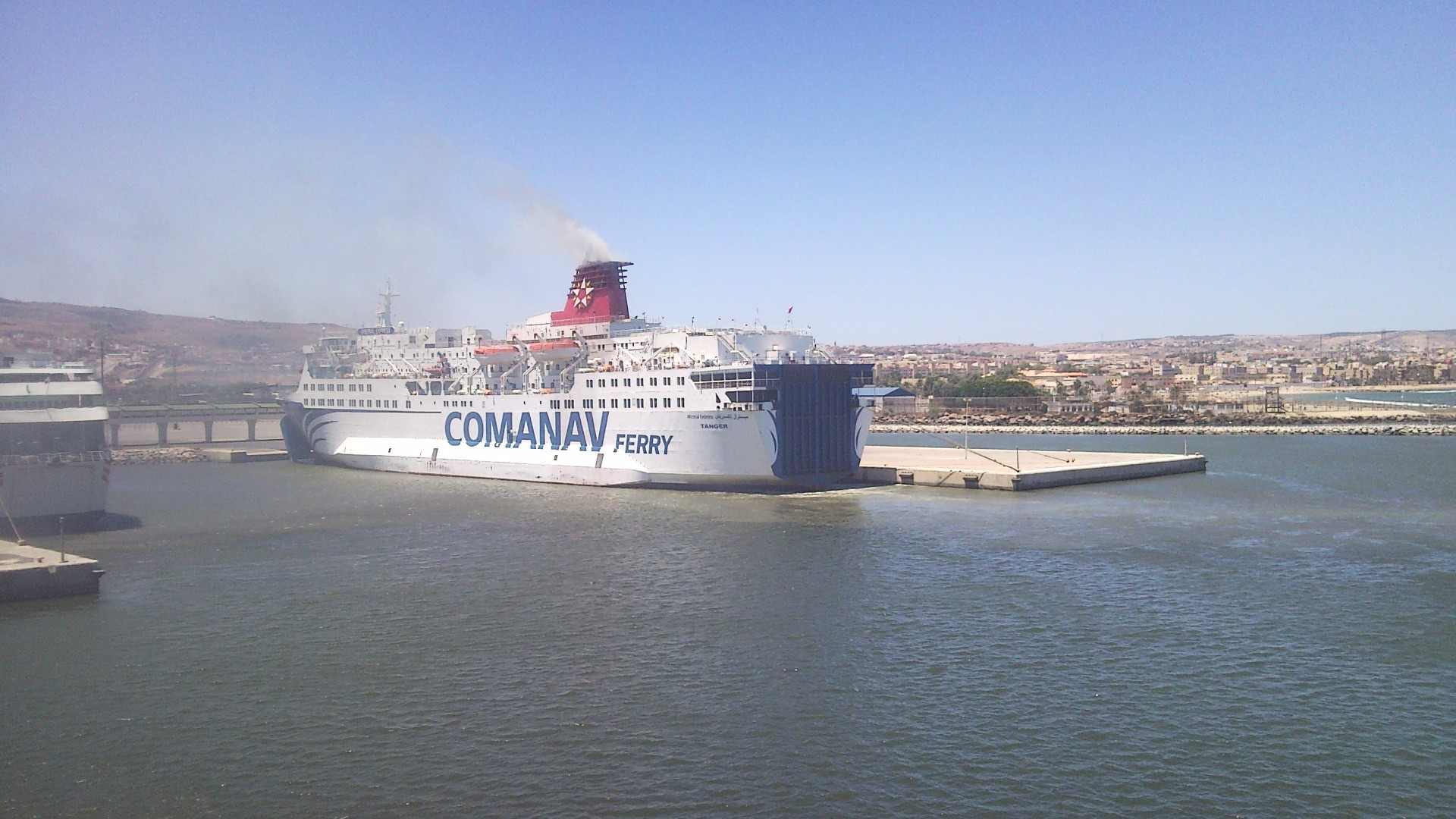
A Comanav ROPAX ferry in the Nador Port

- Acciona Trasmediterránea
- Baleària
- Comanav
- Comarit
- FerriMaroc
- FRS Iberia
- Grandi Navi Veloci
- Grimaldi Lines
- International Maritime Transport Corporation
- Naviera Armas

== Intercity bus companies ==
Bus service in Morocco offers access almost to every corner of the country. There's a wide range of bus companies offering services at bus stations, among them:

- CTM
- Supratours

== Sports car ==
- Laraki
