= JS Saoura in African football =

Algerian football club

- Club: JS Saoura
- Most appearances: Mohamed El Amine Hammia 21
- Top scorer: Mohamed El Amine Hammia 5
- First entry: 2017 CAF Champions League
- Latest entry: 2021–22 CAF Confederation Cup

JS Saoura, an Algerian professional association football club, has gained entry to Confederation of African Football (CAF) competitions on several occasions. They have represented Algeria in the Champions League on two occasions and the Confederation Cup on one occasion.

== History ==
JS Saoura whose team has regularly taken part in Confederation of African Football (CAF) competitions. Qualification for Algerian clubs is determined by a team's performance in its domestic league and cup competitions, JS Saoura is the first club from the south of Algeria to participate in a continental competition, and that was in 2017 in the CAF Champions League as the runner-up of the Ligue Professionnelle 1 and they eliminated in the preliminary round against Enugu Rangers and the first continental goal scored by Abderrahmane Bourdim. Two years later, JS Saoura returned to participate in the same competition, where they qualified for the group stage with Al-Ahly, AS Vita Club and Simba of Tanzania. In the first round, JS Saoura was defeated by Simba 3-0. away from home, then achieved two draws against AS Vita Club and Vita Club, then two victories against Vita Club and Simba, and in the last round, it was defeated against AS Vita Club, ending the group stage in third place with 8 points.

== CAF competitions ==
JS Saoura results in CAF competition
Season	Competition	Round	Opposition	Home	Away	Aggregate
2017	Champions League	Preliminary Round	(Nigeria) Enugu Rangers	1–1	0–0	1–1 (a)
2018–19	Champions League	Preliminary Round	(Ivory Coast) SC Gagnoa	2–0	0–0	2–0
2018–19	Champions League	First round	(Morocco) Ittihad Tanger	2–0	0–1	2–1
2018–19	Champions League	Group stage	(Tanzania) Simba	2–0	0–3	3rd place
2018–19	Champions League	Group stage	(Egypt) Al-Ahly	1–1	0–3	3rd place
2018–19	Champions League	Group stage	(Democratic Republic of the Congo) AS Vita Club	1–0	2–2	3rd place
2021–22	Confederation Cup	Second round	(Mauritania) ASAC Concorde	1–1	2–1	3–2
2021–22	Confederation Cup	Play-off round	(Ghana) Hearts of Oak	4–0	0–2	4–2
2021–22	Confederation Cup	Group stage (Note: JS Saoura play their group stage home matches at Stade du 5 Juillet, Algiers, instead of their regular home stadium Stade 20 Août 1955, Béchar, which did not meet CAF requirements.)	(South Africa) Orlando Pirates	0–2	0–2	3rd place
2021–22	Confederation Cup	Group stage	(Eswatini) Royal Leopards	2–0	2–0	3rd place
2021–22	Confederation Cup	Group stage	(Libya) Al Ittihad	1–0	1–1	3rd place
2022–23	Confederation Cup	Second round	(Ivory Coast) Gagnoa	0–0	0–1	0–1

== Non-CAF competitions ==
Non-CAF competition record
Season	Competition	Round	Opposition	Score
2019–20	Arab Club Champions Cup	Preliminary round	(Comoros) Volcan Club	5–0 (Stade Municipal de Berrechid, Berrechid)
2019–20	Arab Club Champions Cup	Preliminary round	ASAS Djibouti Télécom	1–0 (Stade Municipal de Berrechid, Berrechid)
2019–20	Arab Club Champions Cup	Preliminary round	(Tunisia) CA Bizertin	1–0 (Stade Municipal de Berrechid, Berrechid)
2019–20	Arab Club Champions Cup	First round	(Saudi Arabia) Al-Shabab	1–3 (Stade 20 Août 1955, Béchar); 2–0 (Prince Faisal bin Fahd Stadium, Riyadh)
2023	Arab Club Champions Cup	First round	Kuwait SC	1–0 (Al-Kuwait Sports Club Stadium], Kuwait City); 1–1 (Miloud Hadefi Stadium, Oran)

== Statistics ==
=== By season ===
Information correct as of 15 October 2022.
Key

- Pld = Played
- W = Games won
- D = Games drawn
- L = Games lost
- F = Goals for
- A = Goals against
- Grp = Group stage
- PR = Preliminary round
- R1 = First round
- R2 = Second round
- SR16 = Second Round of 16
- R16 = Round of 16
- QF = Quarter-final
- SF = Semi-final

Key to colours and symbols:

W	Winners
RU	Runners-up

JS Saoura record in African football by season
Season	Competition	Pld	W	D	L	GF	GA	GD	Round
2017	CAF Champions League	2	0	2	0	1	1	+0	PR
2018–19	CAF Champions League	10	4	3	3	10	10	+0	Grp
2021–22	CAF Confederation Cup	10	5	2	3	13	9	+4	Grp
2022–23	CAF Confederation Cup	2	0	1	1	0	1	−1	R2
Total		24	9	8	7	24	21	+3	

=== By competition ===
==== In Africa ====
As of 15 October 2022:

CAF competitions
Competition	Seasons	Played	Won	Drawn	Lost	Goals For	Goals Against	Last season played
Champions League	2	12	4	5	3	11	11	2018–19
CAF Confederation Cup	2	12	5	3	4	13	10	2022–23
Total	4	24	9	8	7	24	21	

==== Non-CAF competitions ====
As of 21 March 2023:

Non-CAF competitions
Competition	Seasons	Played	Won	Drawn	Lost	Goals For	Goals Against	Last season played
Arab Champions League	2	7	3	1	3	9	7	2023
Total	2	7	3	1	3	9	7	

== Statistics by country ==
Statistics correct as of game against SC Gagnoa on October 15, 2022

=== CAF competitions ===
Country	Club	P	W	D	L	GF	GA	GD
Ivory Coast	SC Gagnoa	4	1	2	1	2	1	+1
Subtotal		4	1	2	1	2	1	+1
Morocco	Ittihad Tanger	2	1	0	1	2	1	+1
Subtotal		2	1	0	1	2	1	+1
Tanzania	Simba	2	1	0	1	2	3	−1
Subtotal		2	1	0	1	2	3	−1
Egypt	Al-Ahly	2	0	1	1	1	4	−3
Subtotal		2	0	1	1	1	4	−3
Ghana	Hearts of Oak	2	1	0	1	4	2	+2
Subtotal		2	1	0	1	4	2	+2
(Democratic Republic of the Congo) DR Congo	AS Vita Club	2	1	1	0	3	2	+1
Subtotal		2	1	1	0	3	2	+1
Nigeria	Enugu Rangers	2	0	2	0	1	1	+0
Subtotal		2	0	2	0	1	1	+0
Mauritania	ASAC Concorde	2	1	1	0	3	2	+1
Subtotal		2	1	1	0	3	2	+1
South Africa	Orlando Pirates	2	0	0	2	0	4	−4
Subtotal		2	0	0	2	0	4	−4
Libya	Al Ittihad	2	1	1	0	2	1	+1
Subtotal		2	1	1	0	2	1	+1
Eswatini	Royal Leopards	2	2	0	0	4	0	+4
Subtotal		2	2	0	0	4	0	+4
Total		24	9	8	7	24	21	+3

=== Non-CAF competitions ===
Result summary by country
Country	Pld	W	D	L	GF	GA	GD
Saudi Arabia	2	0	0	2	1	5	−4
Comoros	1	1	0	0	5	0	+5
Djibouti	1	1	0	0	1	0	+1
Kuwait	2	0	1	1	1	2	−1
Tunisia	1	1	0	0	1	0	+1
Total	7	3	1	3	9	7	+2

== African competitions goals ==
Statistics correct as of game against SC Gagnoa on October 15, 2022

Position	Player	TOTAL	CL1	CCC
1	(Algeria) Mohamed El Amine Hammia	5	4	1
2	(Algeria) Aimen Lahmeri	4	–	4
=	(Algeria) Oussama Bellatreche	4	–	4
4	(Algeria) Sid Ali Yahia-Chérif	3	3	–
5	(Algeria) Abdeldjalil Saâd	1	–	1
=	(Algeria) Abderrahmane Bourdim	1	1	–
=	(Algeria) Mohamed Boulaouidet	1	1	–
=	(Algeria) Ziri Hammar	1	1	–
=	(Algeria) Belaid Hamidi	1	–	1
=	(Algeria) Mohamed Amine Ouis	1	–	1
=	(Algeria) Ismaïl Saâdi	1	–	1
=	(Senegal) El Hadji Youssoupha Konaté	1	1	–
Totals		24	11	13

=== Two goals one match ===
N	Date	Player	Match	Score
1	16 October 2021	Aimen Lahmeri	ASAC Concorde – JS Saoura	1–2
2	5 December 2021	Oussama Bellatreche	JS Saoura – Hearts of Oak	4–0

== Non-CAF competitions goals ==
P	Player	Goals
1	(Algeria) Billel Messaoudi	3
2	(Algeria) Oussama Meddahi	1
=	(Algeria) Mohamed El Amine Hammia	1
=	(Algeria) Fateh Talah	1
=	(Algeria) Nacereddine Khoualed	1
=	(Algeria) Sid Ali Yahia-Chérif	1

== List of all-time appearances ==
This list of all-time appearances for JS Saoura in African competitions contains football players who have played for JS Saoura in African football competitions and have managed to accrue 10 or more appearances.

Gold Still playing competitive football in JS Saoura. (Note: Statistics correct as of game against Gagnoa on October 15, 2022.)

#	Name	Position	CL1	CCC	SC	TOTAL	Date of first cap	Debut against	Date of last cap	Final match against
1	(Algeria) Mohamed El Amine Hammia	AM	14	7	–	21	10 Feb 2017	Enugu Rangers	—	—
2	(Algeria) Adel Bouchiba	DM	9	11	–	20	27 Nov 2018	SC Gagnoa	—	—
3	(Algeria) Imadeddine Boubekeur	CB	3	9	–	12	5 Dec 2018	SC Gagnoa	—	—
4	(Algeria) Aimen Lahmeri	LW	3	11	–	13	12 Jan 2019	Simba	—	—
5	(Algeria) Oussama Bellatreche	RW	–	12	–	12	16 Oct 2021	ASAC Concorde	—	—
6	(Algeria) Messala Merbah	AM	11	–	–	11	10 Feb 2017	Enugu Rangers	16 Mar 2019	Al-Ahly
7	(Algeria) Hamza Zaidi	LW	10	–	–	10	10 Feb 2017	Enugu Rangers	16 Mar 2019	Al-Ahly
8	(Algeria) Abdeldjalil Saâd	AM	–	11	–	11	16 Oct 2021	ASAC Concorde	—	—
9	(Algeria) Ibrahim Bekakchi	CB	10	–	–	10	27 Nov 2018	SC Gagnoa	16 Mar 2019	Al-Ahly
