= National Route 6 (Morocco) =

Road in Morocco

National Route 6

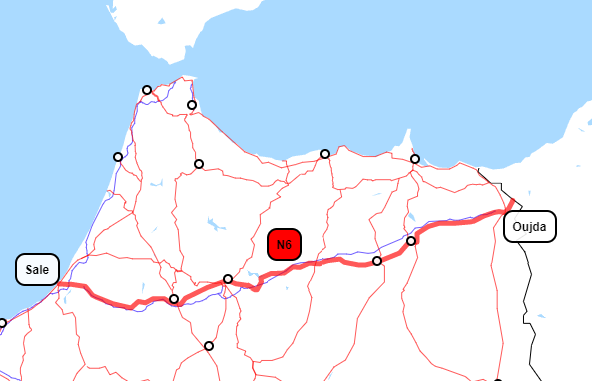

Major junctions
- West end: Rabat
- East end: Maghnia, Algeria

Location
- Country: Morocco

Highway system
- Transport in Morocco

National Route 6 (N6) is a national highway of Morocco. It is one of the most important road networks linking the west of the country to the east, connecting the capital Rabat and Salé on the west coast to Maghnia, Algeria on the border. It passes through many of Morocco's major cities such as Oujda, Fes, Meknes and Khemisset. For much of the Fes- Rabat leg is runs parallel with the A2 Rabat–Fes expressway.
