= National Route 12 (Morocco) =

Road in Morocco

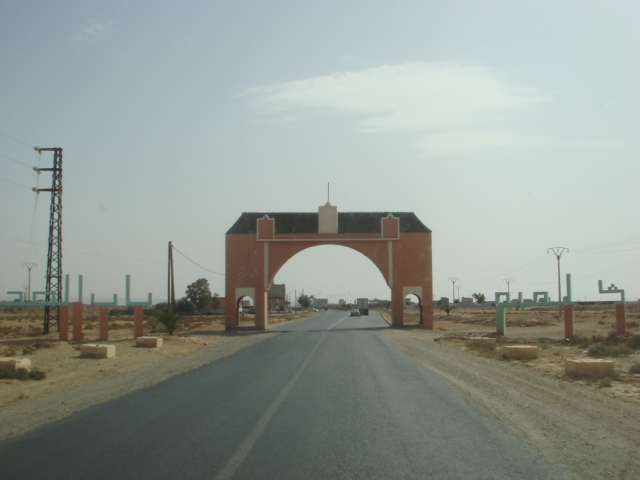

Route 12 is approximately 450 kilometers (280 miles) long, running eastward from Berrechid through several notable towns, including Khenifra, Demnate, and Tinghir. The route connects the Casablanca-Settat region to the Drâa-Tafilalet region, providing access to the High Atlas Mountains and connecting travelers to destinations in Morocco’s inland and southern regions.

== Key locations along Route 12 ==
- Berrechid: The route begins in Berrechid, a city located to the southwest of Casablanca. Berrechid is a key urban center in the Casablanca-Settat region, known for its agricultural production and proximity to major commercial hubs like Casablanca. From https://saharadiscovery.com/tours-from-casablanca/ Berrechid, travelers head east toward the mountains and desert.
- Khenifra: Situated along the N12, Khenifra is a significant town located in the Middle Atlas mountains. It is known for its proximity to the Michlifen Ski Resort and its agricultural activities, including farming and livestock.
- Demnate: Another key town along Route 12, Demnate is located at the foothills of the High Atlas Mountains. It is known for its proximity to the Ouzoud Waterfalls.
- Tinghir: The route ends in Tinghir, a town located near the edge of the Sahara Desert. Tinghir is famous for its proximity to the Todra Gorge, a dramatic canyon carved by the Todra River. The town is a hub for visitors exploring the Dades Valley, the Todra Gorge, and the surrounding desert landscapes.

== Geography and terrain ==
The terrain along Route 12 is varied, transitioning from the fertile plains of the Casablanca-Settat region to the rugged, mountainous landscapes of the Middle Atlas and High Atlas ranges. The route travels through both agricultural and desert regions.

Notable landscapes include the Ouzoud Waterfalls near Demnate, the Todra Gorge near Tinghir, and the valleys of the High Atlas Mountains. The mountainous sections, particularly around Khenifra and Demnate, feature winding roads that offer views of cliffs, valleys, and local villages.

== Climate ==
The climate along Route 12 varies depending on the region and altitude. The area near Berrechid is generally mild with Mediterranean influences, while higher elevations, such as those near Khenifra and Demnate, can experience cooler temperatures, particularly in the winter months. In the desert region around Tinghir, the climate is arid, with hot summers and cooler winters.

Travelers should be prepared for temperature fluctuations, especially when transitioning from the mountain regions to the desert. Summers can be very hot in the southern parts of the route, while winters can bring snow to the higher mountain areas.
