= Tinghir =

Tinghir تنغير (Arabic) ⵜⵉⵏⵖⵉⵔ (Standard Moroccan Tamazight)
- City
- Interactive map of Tinghir
- Coordinates: 31°30′53″N 5°31′58″W
- Country: Morocco
- Region: Drâa-Tafilalet
- Province: Tinghir

Population (2024)
  - Total: 44,239
- Time zone: UTC+0 (GMT)
- Postal code: 45800

Tinghir (Note: Arabic: تنغير, Standard Moroccan Tamazight: ⵜⵉⵏⵖⵉⵔ, romanized: Tinɣir) is a city in the region of Drâa-Tafilalet, south of the High Atlas and north of Saghro. It is the capital of Tinghir Province.

Lush palm trees cover about 38 km on tracts 500 to 1500 metre wide along the Wadi Todgha. After the Todra Gorge, Wadi Todgha has a difficult passage along the southern slopes of the Atlas Mountains (Tizgi); it then flows across the plain, meandering slightly over 20 kilometres (12 mi) to Ferkla. The palm oasis, dense and widespread, is irrigated by a network of pipes and irrigation canals. Occasional heavy rains are absorbed in a few days.

The city has a population of 44,239 according to the 2024 Moroccan census.

== Name ==
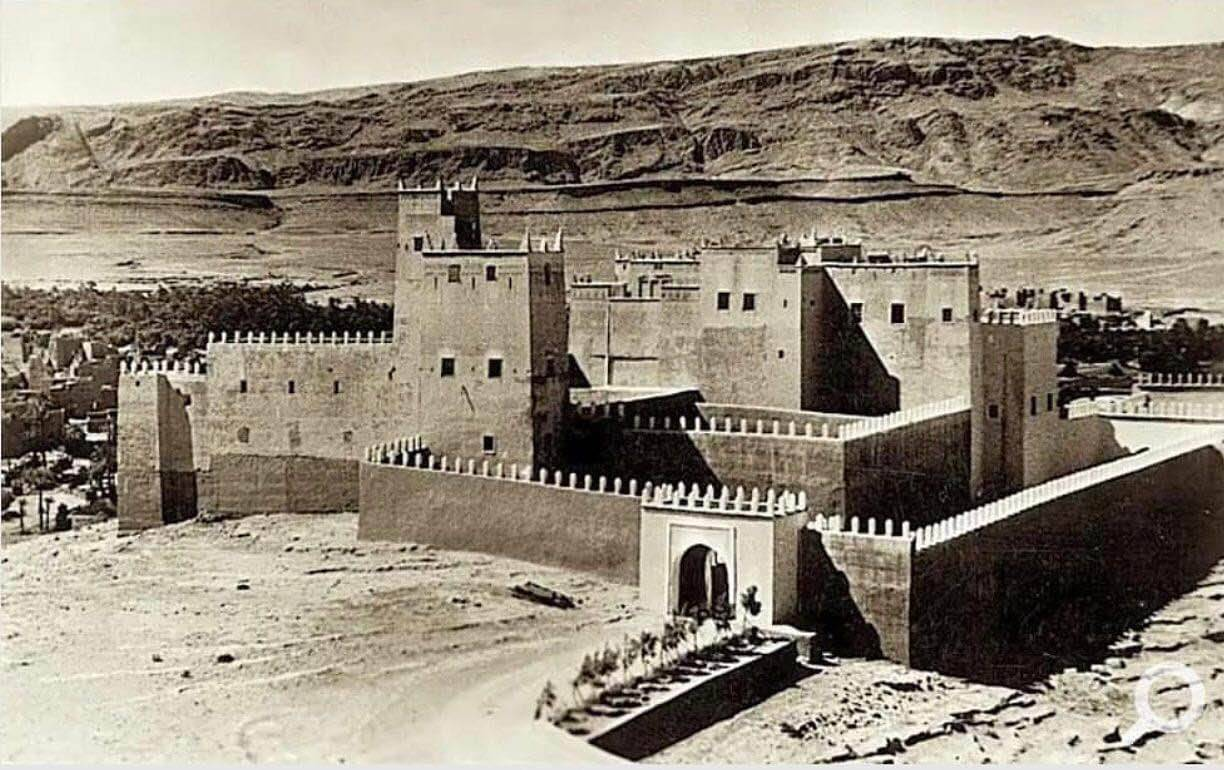
The Kasbah (igherm) of Tinghir c. 1920

According to Moroccan historian Ahmed Toufiq the names of Tinghir and Tangier (ancient name Tingi) have the same etymology, composed of "Tin", which is a feminine particle that could be translated as "owner" or "she who has", and "gi" which may have originally been "ig", meaning "high location". A similar construction can be found in the name of Tinmel, the first capital of the Almohads, which is composed of "Tin", and "Amlel" meaning "at foot of the mountain" or "at a low location".

== Economy ==
The economy of Tinghir is based on agriculture, trade and tourism. In addition, many families live on money sent home by relatives working in Europe. Social and cultural activities are increasing; education projects for young children are increasing in many villages, as well as literacy projects aimed at adults (particularly women). These projects are supported by local and nongovernmental organisations.

== Geography ==
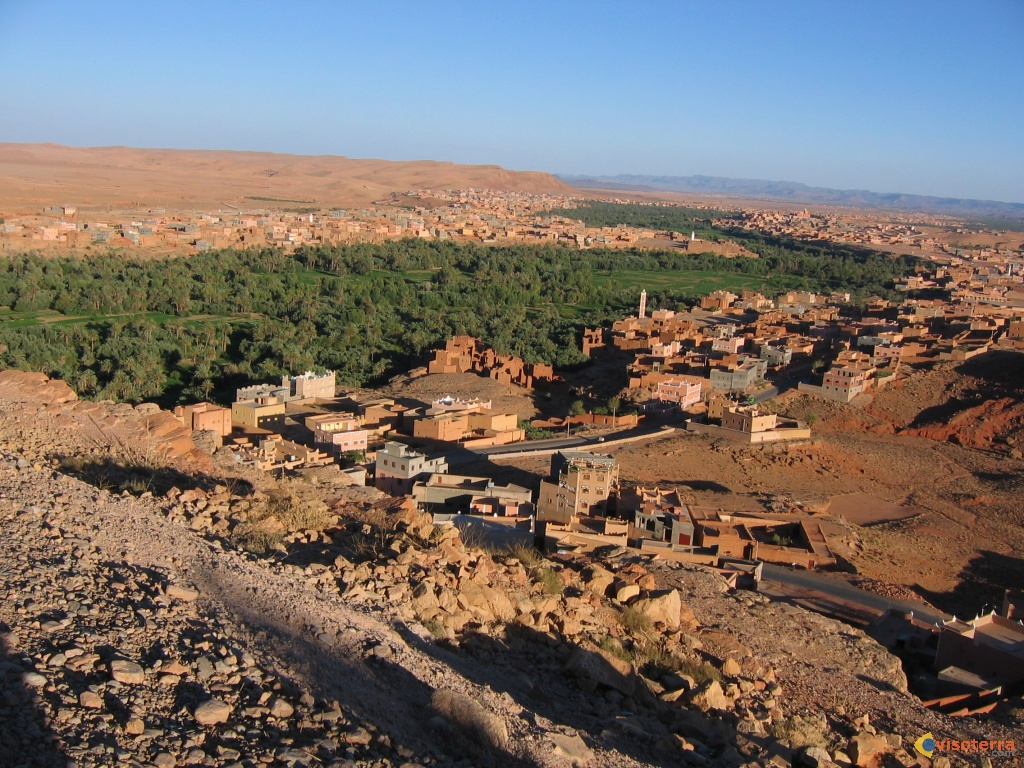
Tinghir oasis

Todgha Gorge, near Tinghir

Tinghir is an oasis about 30 kilometres (19 mi) long and about 4 kilometres (2.5 mi) wide. The climate is arid subtropical: hot, dry winters about altitude (1,430 metres (4,690 ft)). There are a few rainy days per year, with the greatest precipitation in fall and winter.

The Tinghir region is wedged between two mountain ranges, stretching over 700 kilometres (430 mi) southwest to northeast Morocco: the High Atlas in the north, with a high peak of over 4,167 metres (13,671 ft), and the Saghro in the south. The road from Ouarzazate to Imtghren parallels the mountains. During the Mesozoic, the region was submerged by the sea, where thick deposits of sediments rich in marine fossils (particularly of the ammonitida class). The uplift of the Atlas Mountains (primarily during the Neogene) caused the withdrawal of the sea and the deformation of rocks into folds and faults. Wind and river erosion eventually shaped the desert landscape of limestone and clay. The Todgha River has widened these layers of rock, giving rise to canyons 300 metres (980 ft) high but in some places only 10 metres (33 ft) wide. The river widens, developing an oasis edged with the red ochre of the desert.

== Government ==
King Mohammed VI gave his approval on 21 January 2009 to make Tinghir an administrative center, an initiative that met the needs of its inhabitants; it provides a legal and institutional framework for the reform of territorial administration based on good governance and local self-administration.
