= Todgha Gorge =

Canyon in Morocco

- View from the canyon floor
- Floor elevation: approx. 1,500 metres (4,921 ft)
- Length: 15 miles (24 km)
- Width: 10 to 1,000 metres (33 to 3,281 ft)

Geography
- Location: Tinghir Province
- Coordinates: 31.59°N 5.59°W
- Interactive map of Todgha Gorge

The Todgha Gorges (Berber languages: ⵜⵉⵣⵉ ⵏ ⵜⵓⴷⵖⴰ; Arabic: مضيق تودغا‌) are a series of limestone river canyons, or wadi, in the eastern part of the High Atlas Mountains in Morocco, near the town of Tinghir. Both the Todgha (or Todra) River and the neighbouring Dadès River are responsible for carving out these deep cliff-sided canyons, on their final 40 kilometres (25 mi) through the mountains. The height of the canyon walls can vary, but in some places can be up to 400 metres (1,312 ft) high.

== Description ==
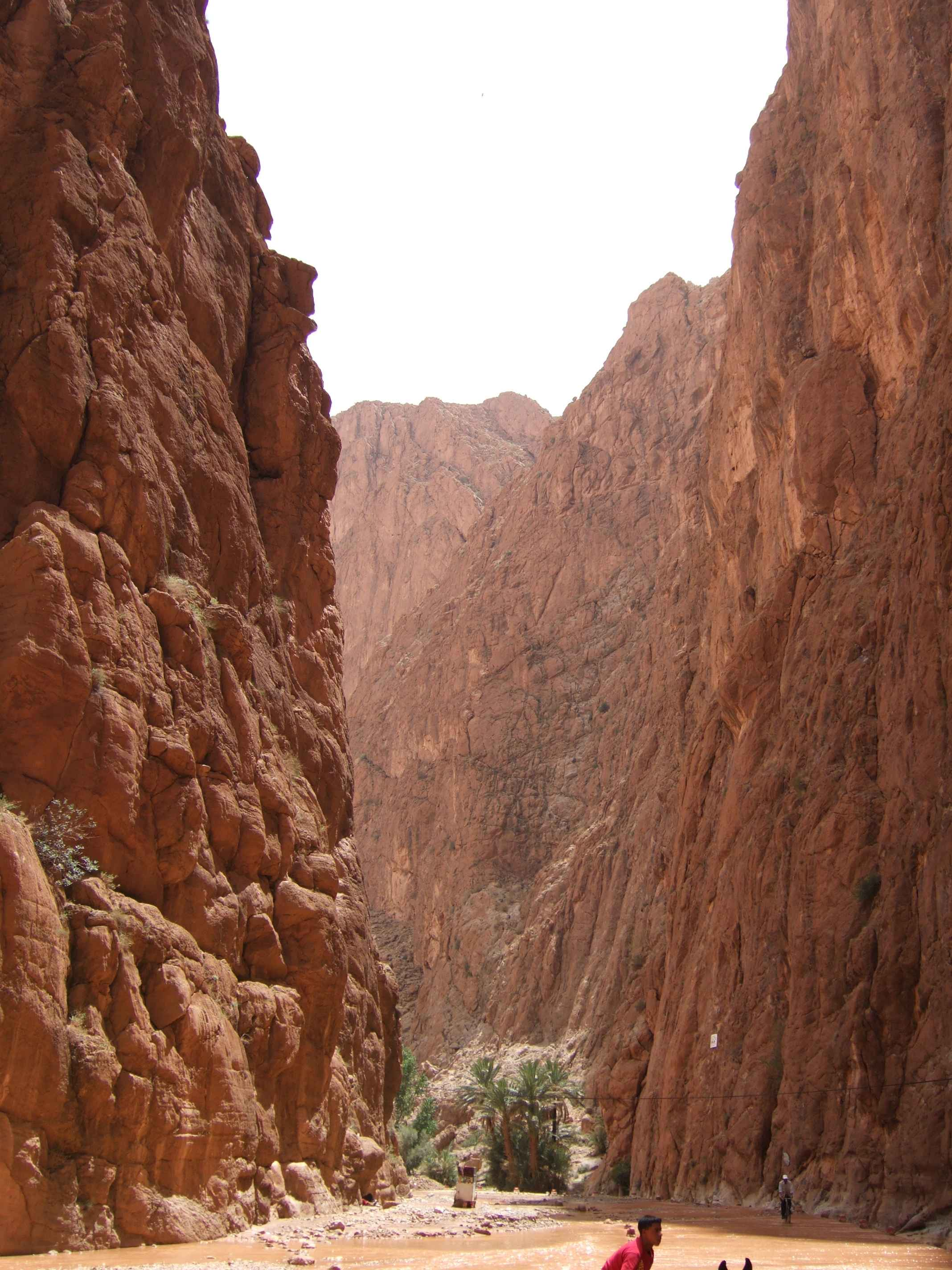
Todgha gorge at its narrow mouth during flooding

The last 600 metres (1,969 ft) of the Todgha gorge are the most spectacular. Here the canyon narrows to a flat stony track, in places as little as 10 metres (33 ft) wide, with sheer and smooth rock walls up to 160 metres (525 ft) high on each side.

During the dry season, the canyon floor is mostly dry; at most there will be a small stream of water. During this time, the wadi floor is easily traversed by travelers. During the rainy season, however, the Todra can expand massively, covering the canyon floor in a strong torrent.
