= Argana =

Coordinates: 30°47′N 9°07′W

- Rural commune and town
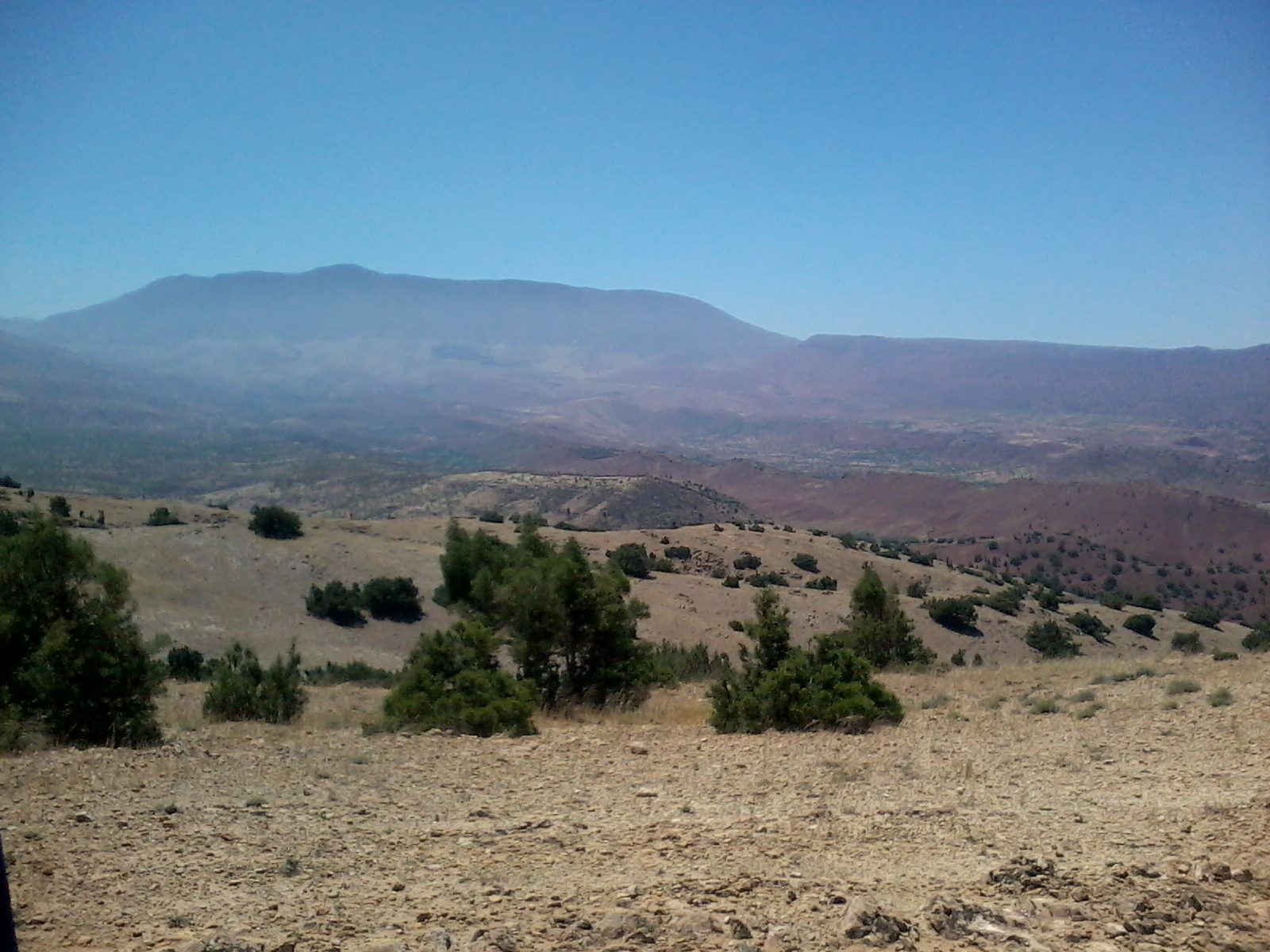
- Interactive map of Argana
- Country: Morocco
- Region: Souss-Massa-Drâa
- Province: Taroudant Province

Population (2004)
  - Total: 5,327
- Time zone: UTC+0 (GMT)

Argana is a small town and rural commune in Taroudant Province of the Souss-Massa-Drâa region of Morocco. At the time of the 2004 census, the commune had a total population of 5327 people living in 915 households.
