= Mohammed V International Airport =

Airport serving Casablanca, Morocco

Mohammed V International Airport مطار محمد الخامس الدولي
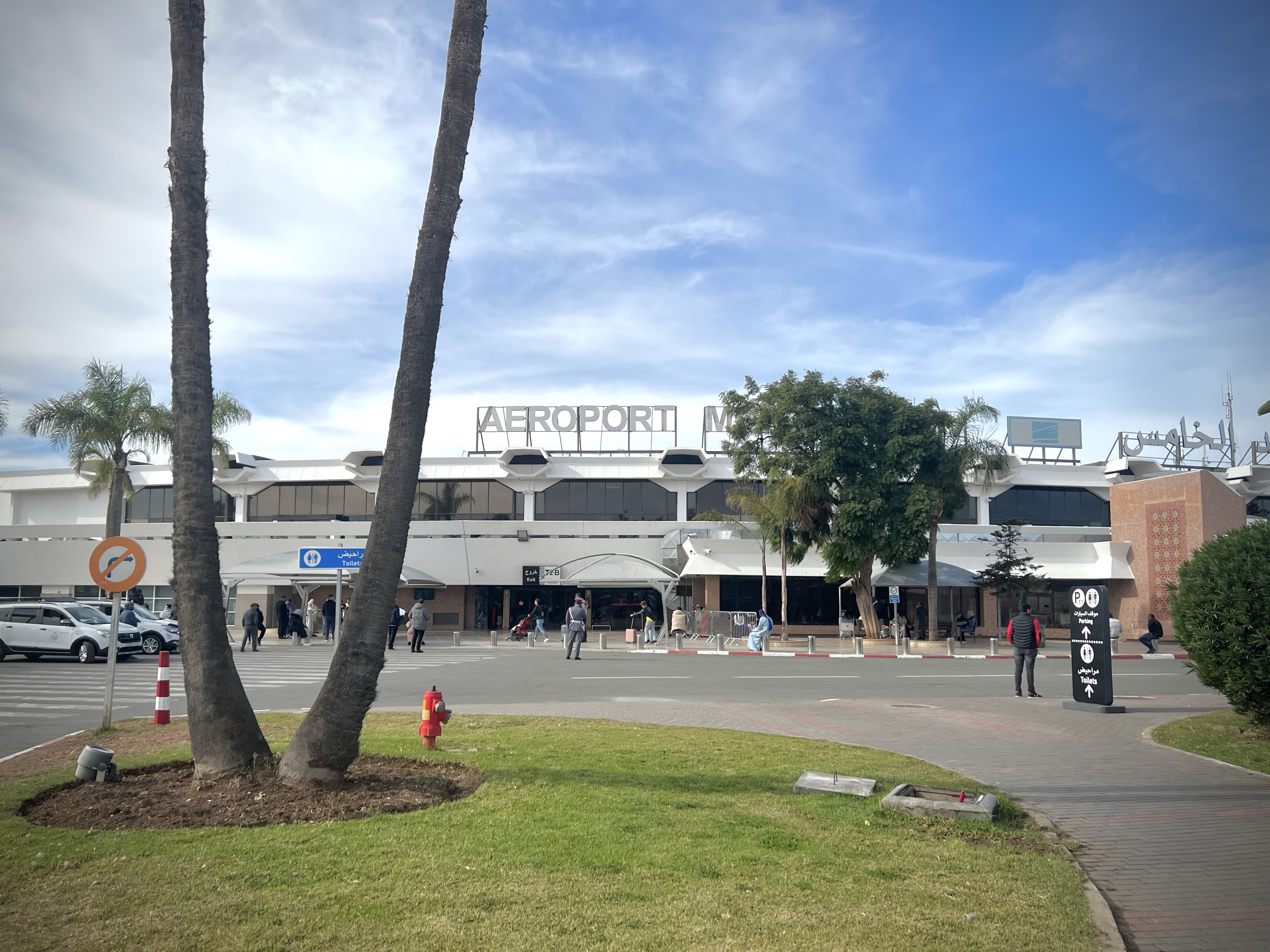
- IATA: CMN; ICAO: GMMN

Summary
- Airport type: Public
- Operator: Airports of Morocco
- Serves: Casablanca, Morocco
- Location: Nouasseur
- Hub for: Air Arabia Maroc; Royal Air Maroc; Royal Air Maroc Express
- Elevation AMSL: 656 ft (200 m)
- Coordinates: 33°22′02″N 007°35′23″W
- Website: www.aeroportcasablanca.ma/en/

Map
- Location of airport in Morocco

Runways
Direction	Length		Surface
Direction	m	ft	Surface
17L/35R	3,720	12,205	Asphalt
17R/35L	3,720	12,205	Asphalt

Statistics
- Passengers (2024): 10,449,372
- Aircraft movements (2022): 67,074
- Economic impact (2012): $731 million
- Sources: France Aviation Civile Services and Ecquants

Mohammed V International Airport (Note: Arabic: مطار محمد الخامس الدولي, Matar Muhammad al-Khamis ad-Dowaly; Berber languages: ⴰⵣⴰⴳⵯⵣ ⴰⴳⵔⵖⵍⴰⵏ ⵎⵓⵃⵎⵎⴷ ⵡⵙ5; French: Aéroport International de Mohammed V) IATA: CMN, ICAO: GMMN is an international airport serving Casablanca, Morocco. Located in Nouaceur Province, it is operated by Airports of Morocco.

With about 7.6 million passengers passing through the airport in 2022, it was the busiest airport in Morocco and in the top 10 of busiest airports in Africa. Passenger traffic in 2022 had recovered to 74% of the total pre-pandemic numbers of 2019. The airport serves as hub for Royal Air Maroc, Royal Air Maroc Express and Air Arabia Maroc. The airport is named after King Mohammed V of Morocco.

== History ==
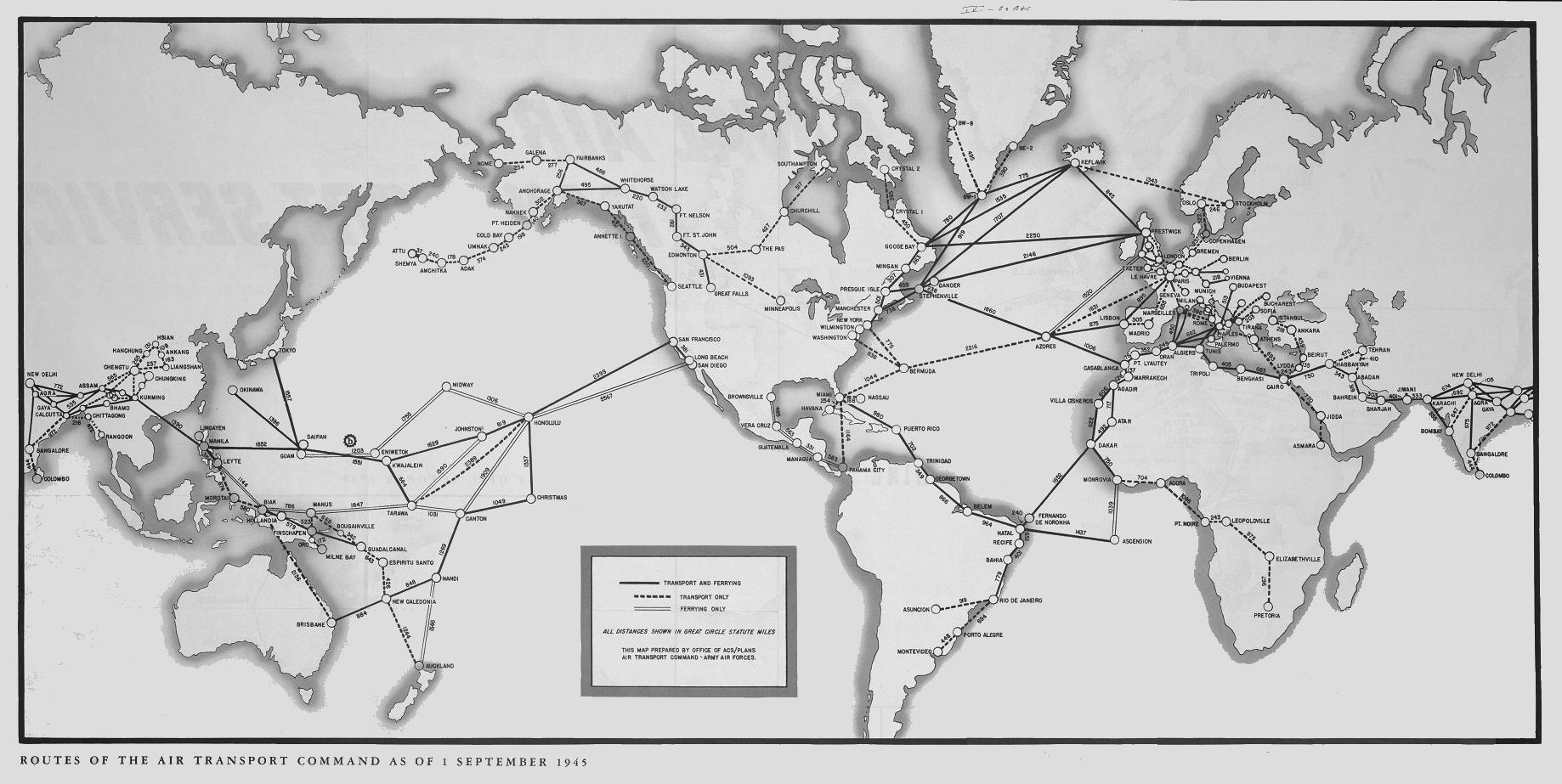
Transatlantic routes from Casablanca, September 1945

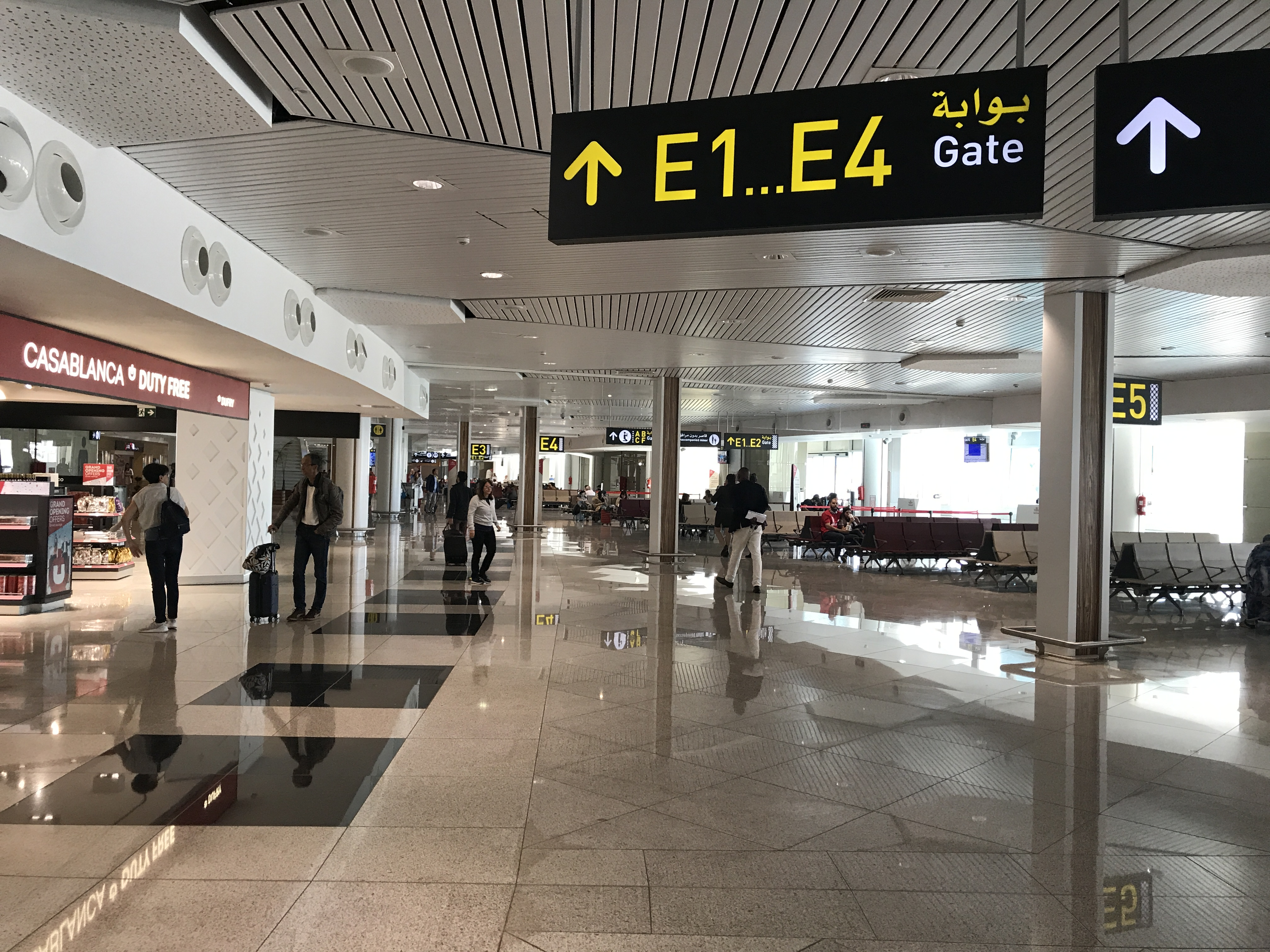
Terminal 1 interior

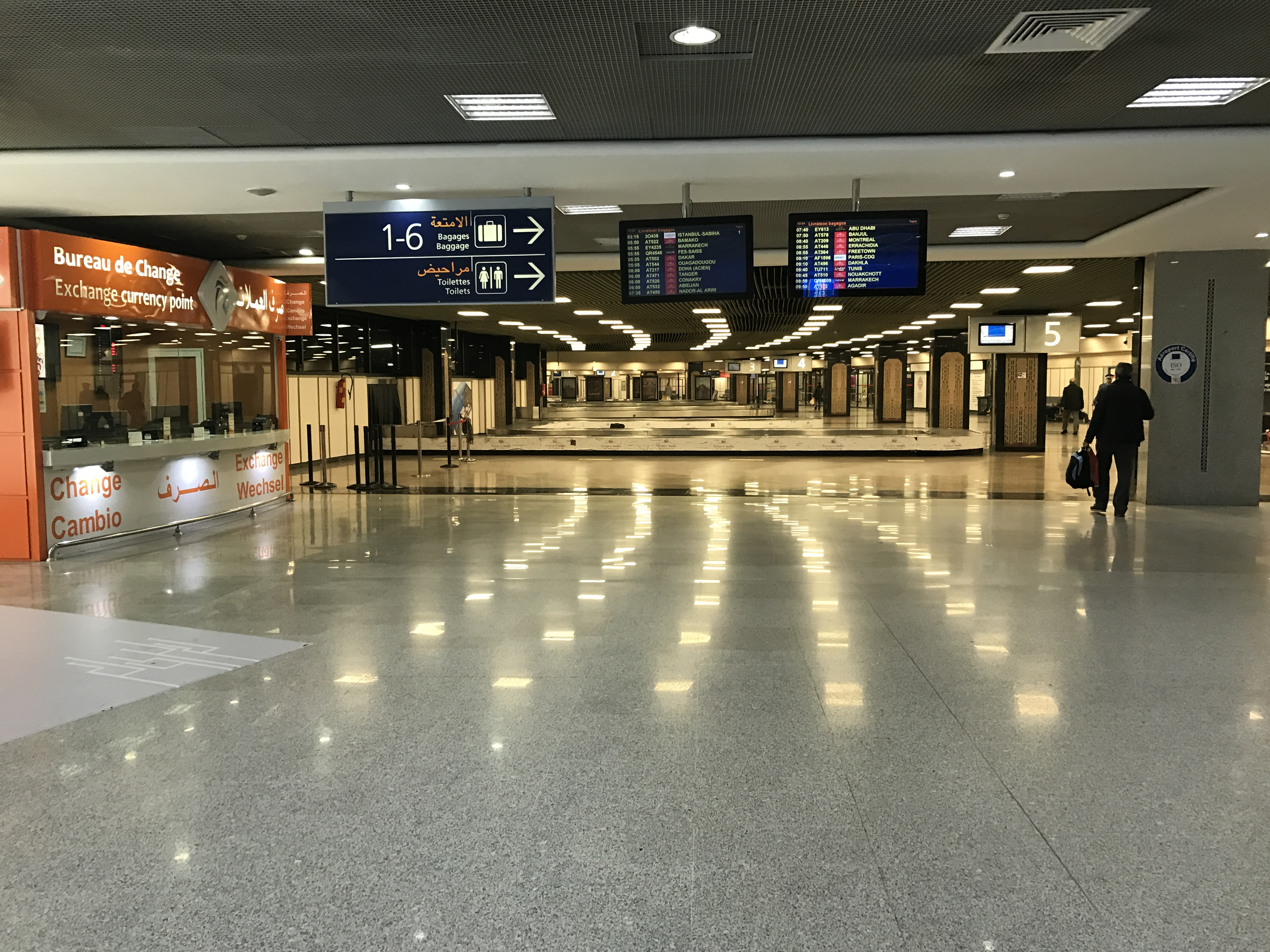
Arrivals area

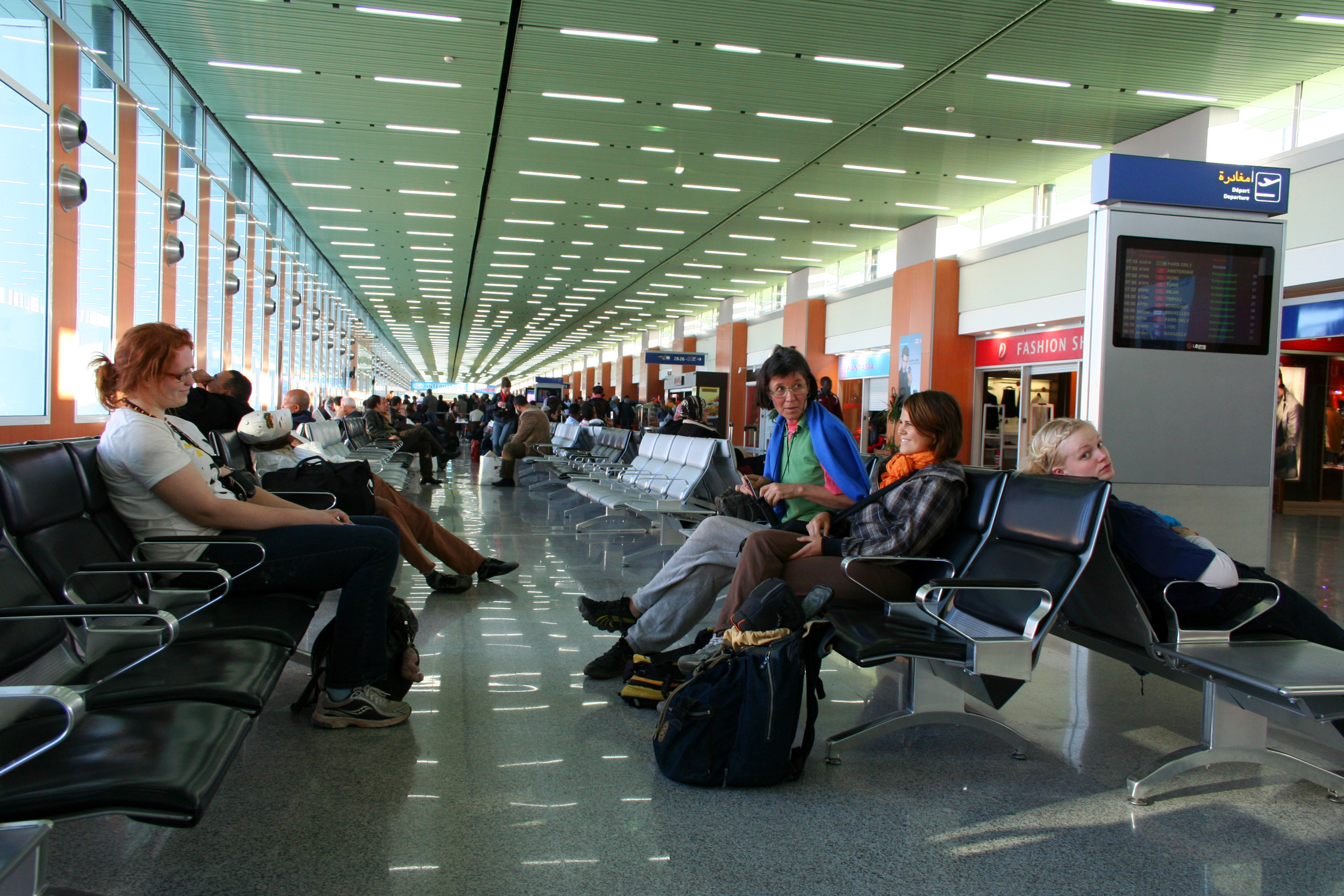
Departure gates

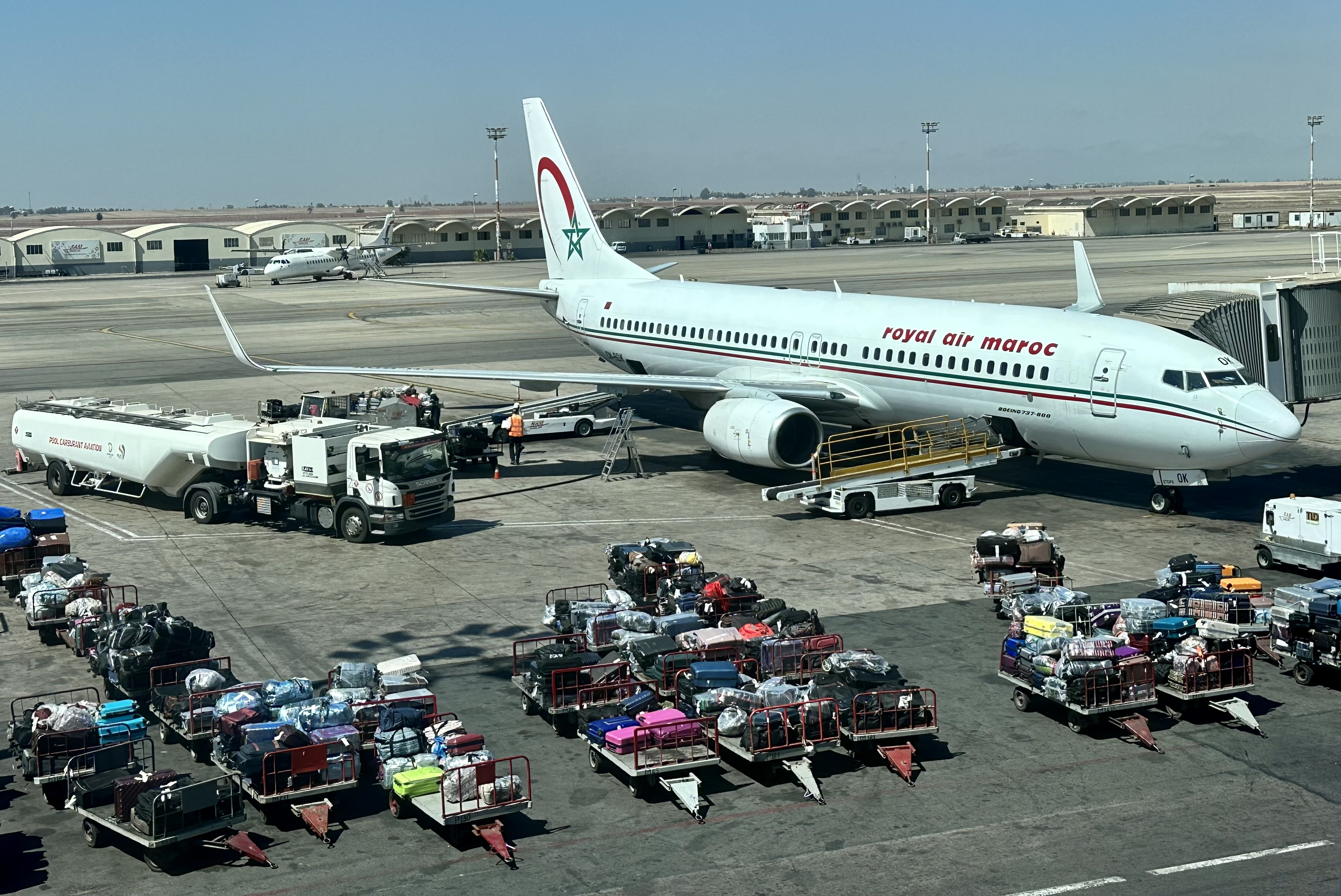
Royal Air Maroc Boeing 737–800

=== 1940s ===
The Casablanca Mohammed V Airport was originally built by the United States in early 1943 following Operation Torch in World War II. It was named Berrechid Airfield and it served as an auxiliary airfield for Casablanca's Anfa Airport. The airfield handled diverse military traffic as a stopover en route to Port Lyautey Airfield, and to Marrakesh Menara Airport on the North African Cairo-Dakar route. In addition, it was the terminus of Mid-Atlantic route transatlantic flights via the Azores to Nova Scotia and airfields on the East Coast of the United States.

In addition to its transportation role, the airfield supported the North African Campaign with the Twelfth Air Force 68th Reconnaissance Group operating photo-reconnaissance versions of the P-38 Lightning and P-51 Mustang. Part of the 68th first arrived at Angads Airport in Oujda in November 1942 and moved to Berrechid in March 1943 upon its completion. It flew both antisubmarine missions over the Atlantic and photo-reconnaissance combat missions over German-held territory until early September when it moved east to Massicault Airfield in Tunisia. With the end of the war in 1945, the airfield was handed over to the civil government.

=== 1950s ===
During the Cold War in the early and middle 1950s, the airfield was reopened as Nouasseur Air Base and was used as a United States Air Force Strategic Air Command staging area for B-47 Stratojet bombers pointed at the Soviet Union. These operations later moved to Ben Guerir Air Base.

With the destabilisation of French government in Morocco, and Moroccan independence in 1956, the government of Mohammed V wanted the US Air Force to pull its bases out of Morocco, insisting on such action after American intervention in Lebanon in 1958. The United States agreed to leave in December 1959, and was fully out of Morocco by 1963. The U.S. felt that, with the long range of the B-52 and completion of Spanish bases in 1959, the Moroccan bases were no longer important.

=== 2020s ===
In 2022, Mohammed V Airport was ranked the 4th busiest airport in Africa.

==== New terminal project (2025–2029) ====
In May 2025 Morocco's airports authority Moroccan Airports Authority launched an international tender to build a new H-shaped terminal at Mohammed V International Airport in Casablanca at an estimated cost of US$1.6 billion. The terminal, designed in a “hub-style”, will increase capacity from roughly 15 million to 35 million passengers per year. It will form part of Morocco's Airports 2030 strategy and is expected to be completed by 2029 in time for the 2030 FIFA World Cup which Morocco will co-host with Spain and Portugal.

The expansion project features:

- A new 3,700 m parallel runway, extended taxiways and a new 42 m air traffic control tower.
- An integrated high-speed rail (LGV) station linking the airport with Casablanca, Rabat and Marrakesh via the Al Boraq line.

Earthworks began in mid-2025 with main construction slated to follow and full operation targeted for 2029.

== Airlines and destinations ==
=== Passenger ===
The following airlines operate regular scheduled and charter flights at Casablanca Mohammed V International Airport:

Airlines	Destinations
Aegean Airlines	Athens
Air Arabia	Barcelona, Basel/Mulhouse, Bergamo, Bologna, Brussels, Catania, Cuneo, Geneva, Istanbul–Sabiha Gökçen, Lyon, Madrid, Málaga, Montpellier, Naples, Pisa, Venice
Air Cairo	Seasonal: Alexandria, Sharm El Sheikh
Air Canada	Montréal–Trudeau
Air France	Paris–Charles de Gaulle, Paris–Orly
Air Senegal	Dakar–Diass
Alexandria Airlines	Seasonal charter: Sharm El Sheikh
Binter Canarias	Gran Canaria
Egyptair	Cairo
Emirates	Dubai–International
Etihad Airways	Abu Dhabi
Eurowings	Seasonal: Düsseldorf
Flynas	Jeddah
Gulf Air	Bahrain
Iberia	Madrid
Kuwait Airways	Kuwait City
Lufthansa	Frankfurt
Mauritania Airlines	Nouakchott
Pegasus Airlines	Istanbul–Sabiha Gökçen
Qatar Airways	Doha
Royal Air Maroc	Abidjan, Abuja, Accra, Agadir, Amsterdam, Bamako, Bangui, Banjul, Barcelona, Beijing–Daxing, Bissau, Bologna, Bordeaux, Brazzaville, Brussels, Cairo, Catania, Conakry, Cotonou, Dakar–Diass, Dakhla, Doha, Douala, Dubai–International, Errachidia, Frankfurt, Freetown, Geneva, Istanbul, Jeddah, Kinshasa–N'djili, Laayoune, Lagos, Libreville, Lisbon, Lomé, London–Gatwick, London–Heathrow, London–Stansted, Los Angeles, Luanda, Lyon, Madrid, Malabo, Manchester, Marrakesh, Marseille, Medina, Miami, Milan–Malpensa, Monrovia–Roberts, Montpellier, Montréal–Trudeau, Moscow–Sheremetyevo, Munich, Nantes, Naples, N'Djamena, New York–JFK, Niamey, Nice, Nouakchott, Ouagadougou, Oujda, Paris–Charles de Gaulle, Paris–Orly, Porto, Praia, Riyadh, Rome–Fiumicino, Saint Petersburg, Sal, São Paulo–Guarulhos, Seville, Strasbourg, Tenerife-South, Toronto–Pearson, Toulouse, Tunis, Turin, Venice, Washington–Dulles, Yaoundé, Zurich
Royal Air Maroc Express	Agadir, Al Hoceima, Fez, Gran Canaria, Málaga, Marrakesh, Nador, Ouarzazate, Oujda, Tangier, Tan Tan, Tétouan, Valencia, Zagora
Royal Jordanian	Amman–Queen Alia
Saudia	Jeddah, Medina, Riyadh
Shanghai Airlines	Marseille, Shanghai–Pudong
TAP Air Portugal	Lisbon
Transavia	Amsterdam, Lyon, Nantes, Paris–Orly; Seasonal: Marseille
TUI fly Belgium	Bologna, Brussels, Lille, Paris–Orly, Rotterdam
Tunisair	Tunis
Turkish Airlines	Istanbul; Seasonal: Antalya

=== Cargo ===
Airlines	Destinations
Air France Cargo	Paris–Charles de Gaulle
Lufthansa Cargo	Frankfurt
Med Airlines	Bamako, Dakar–Senghor, Lisbon, Paris–Orly, Tangier
Qatar Airways Cargo	Doha
Royal Air Maroc Cargo	Abidjan, Accra, Bamako, Brussels, Douala, Frankfurt, Lagos, Libreville, London–Gatwick, Madrid
Turkish Cargo	Istanbul

== Traffic ==
Traffic	2010		2009		2008		2007		2006		2005		2004	Average growth 2004–2009
Aircraft movements	n/a	–	69,119	+1.11%	68,362	−2.5%	70,080	+7.6%	65,111	+9.2%	59,621	+13.9%	52,336	+5.86%
Passengers	7,245,508	+13,28	6,395,862	+2.95%	6,209,711	+6.0%	5,858,192	+15.5%	5,071,411	+12.1%	4,456,639	+17.1%	3,803,479	+10.73%
Freight (tons)	n/a	–	53,469	-6.06%	56,919	−6.5%	60,682	+9.3%	55,673	+10.7%	50,285	+6.5%	47,152	+2.79%

== Ground transport ==
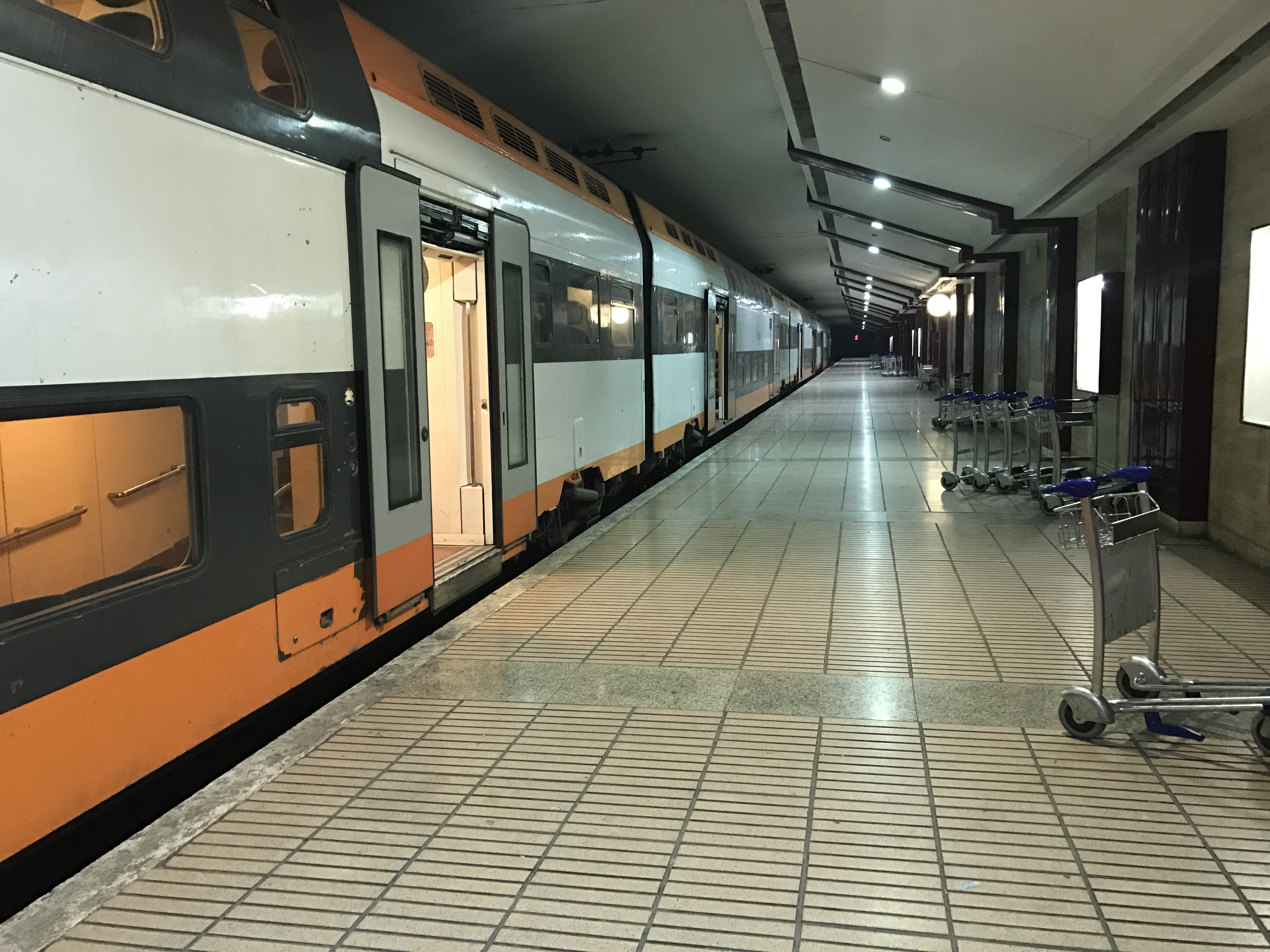
The train station in Casablanca Mohammed V Airport

=== Rail ===
The Al Bidaoui train service, operated by ONCF from 04:00 to 23:00, is available every hour and connects the airport to Casablanca's two main railway stations, Casa-Port Railway Terminal and Casa-Voyageurs Railway Station.

=== Car ===
- From Casablanca main access is by A3 Motorway;
- From Rabat by A1 Motorway through Tit Mellil and A31 Motorway;
- From Beni Mellal by A4 Motorway;
- From Marrakesh by A3 Motorway exit km 225;
- From El Jadida by A1 Motorway and A3 Motorway.

== Incidents and accidents ==
- On 1 April 1970, a Royal Air Maroc Sud Aviation SE-210 Caravelle crashed on approach to Casablanca Mohammed V airport when it lost control at a height of about 500 feet. The fuselage broke in two. Sixty-one of the eighty-two passengers and crew were killed.

== See also ==
- Transport in Morocco
