= National Route 8 (Morocco) =

Road in Morocco

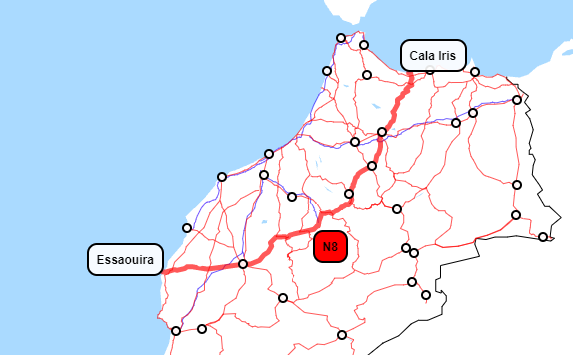

Major junctions
- West end: Agadir
- East end: Fez

Location
- Country: Morocco

Highway system
- Transport in Morocco

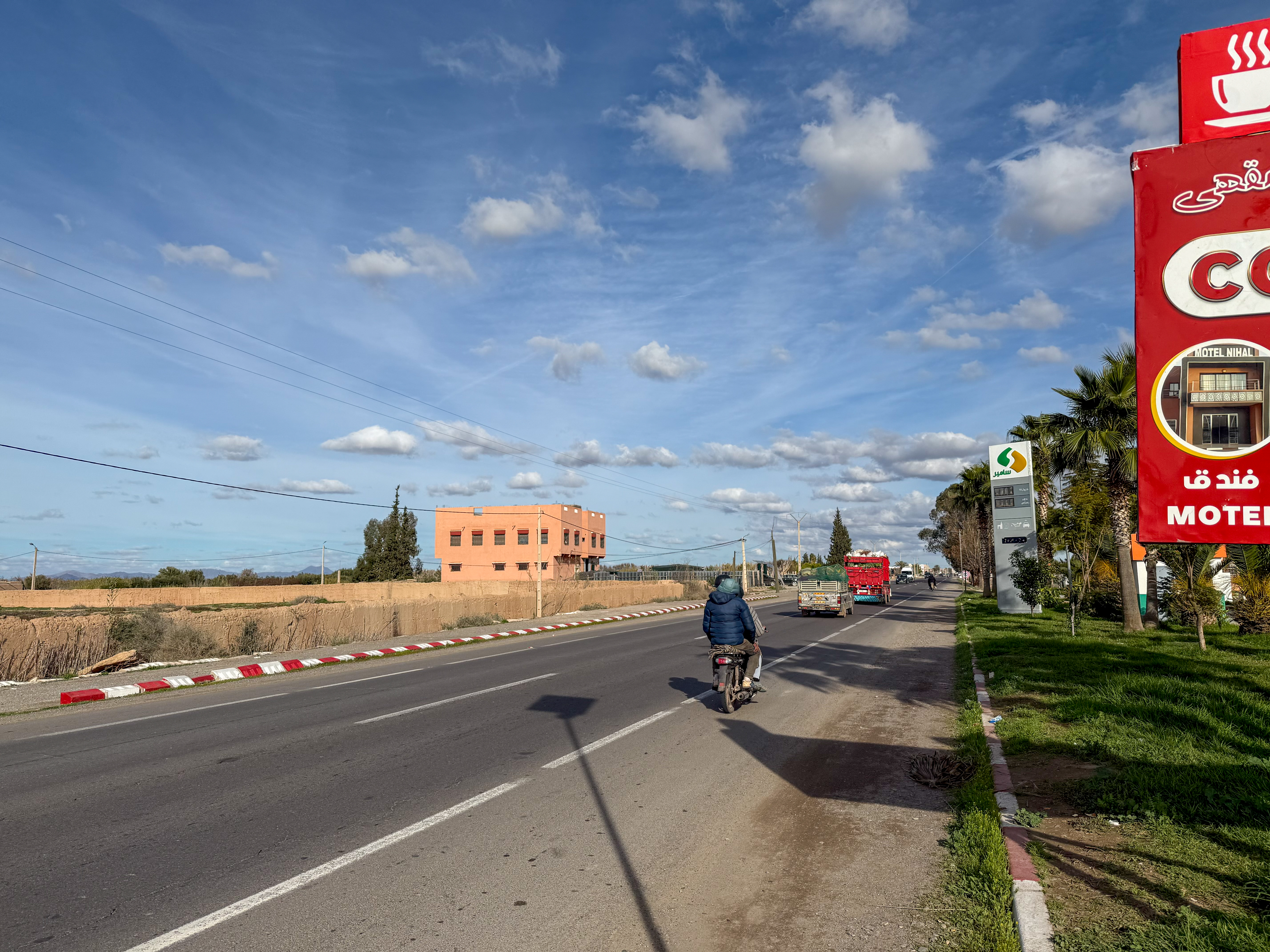
National Route 8 near Marrakesh

National Route 8 (N8) is a national highway of Morocco. It is one of the most important road networks running through mid-central Morocco. It links with National Route 1 in Inezgane, a southern suburb of Agadir near the Atlantic coast to the central mountainous area of the country. The highway passes through cities such as Chichaoua, Marrakesh, Beni Mellal, Khenifra, Fez, and the ski resort in the Atlas Mountains, Ifrane. At Marrakech it connects with the National Route 9.

In June 2010 the main-section from Marrakech to Agadir with a length of 180,5 km was completed. Other sections around Marrakech were completed in January 2009: a 17 km stretch from the exit Marrakech West to the RN8 and the ring-road around Marrakech of 33 km. The total building costs of these three parts were 34,71 Million Dirhams
