= National Route 11 (Morocco) =

Road in Morocco

Route National N11 in Morocco runs from Berrechid to Beni-Mellal.

To ease the load on this RN straight through the Atlas Mountains the Société Nationale des Autoroutes du Maroc started in 2010 the development of a toll-road/expressway: A11. This expressway will be 172 km. long and will be opened in 2013.
