= National Route 1 (Morocco) =

Major road in Morocco

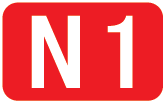
National Route 1

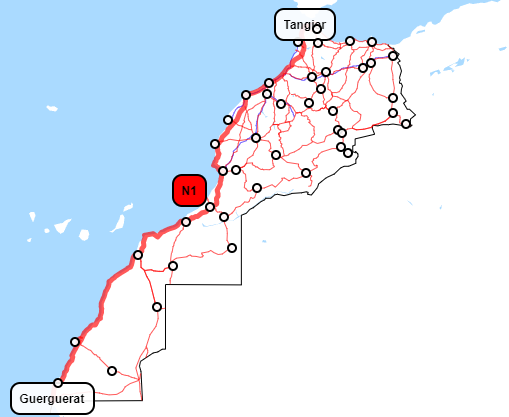
- Road N1 in red

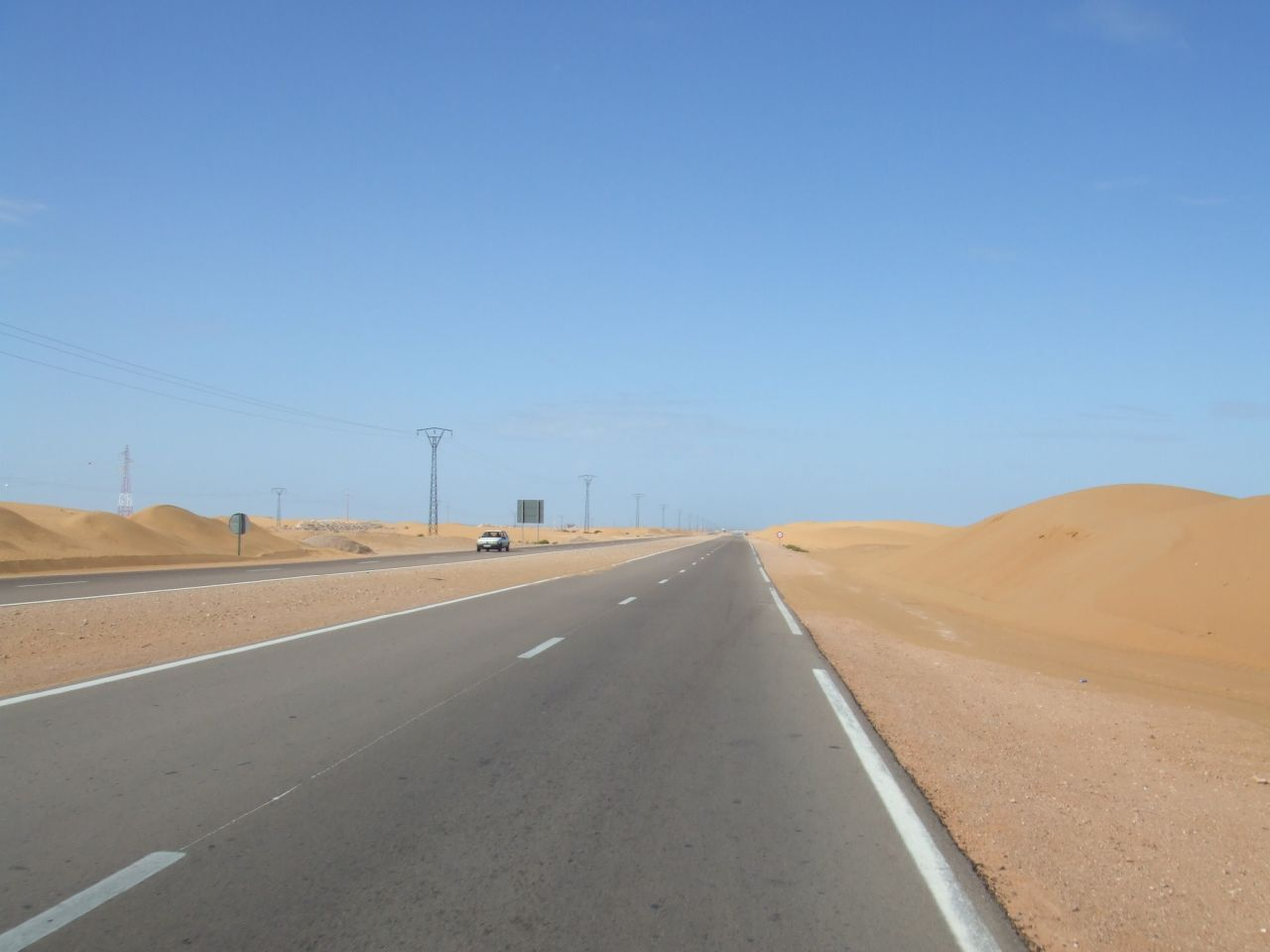

Major junctions
- South end: Guerguerat, Western Sahara
- North end: Tangier, Morocco

Location
- Country: Morocco

Highway system
- Transport in Morocco

National Route 1 (N1) is a national highway of Morocco. It connects Guerguerat in Moroccan-occupied Western Sahara (near the border with Mauritania) to Tangier on the northwest coast of Morocco. It is an important highway running along the western Atlantic coast of Morocco and Western Sahara. It passes through Rabat, Larache and other important cities and for a substantial part of the Rabat-Tangier leg runs parallel with the A1 Rabat–Tangier expressway. It is the longest national motorway in Morocco.

Between Tan-Tan and Tarfaya, the route runs through Khenifiss National Park. National Route 1 is a part of a major transport corridor which runs from Morocco via Mauritania to Dakar in Senegal.

In July 2026, US president Donald Trump shared an AI-generated video announcing that the Tiznit–Dakhla segment of the highway had been renamed the President Donald J. Trump Highway to honor the United States's recognition of Morocco's sovereignty over the Western Sahara. On August 2, 2026, the Moroccan government officially confirmed the naming via the state news agency MAP, noting King Mohammed VI's decision to name the route the Donald J. Trump Highway as a mark of deep appreciation.
