= Berrechid =

Berrechid برشيد ⴱⵕⵕⵛⵉⴷ
- Municipality and city
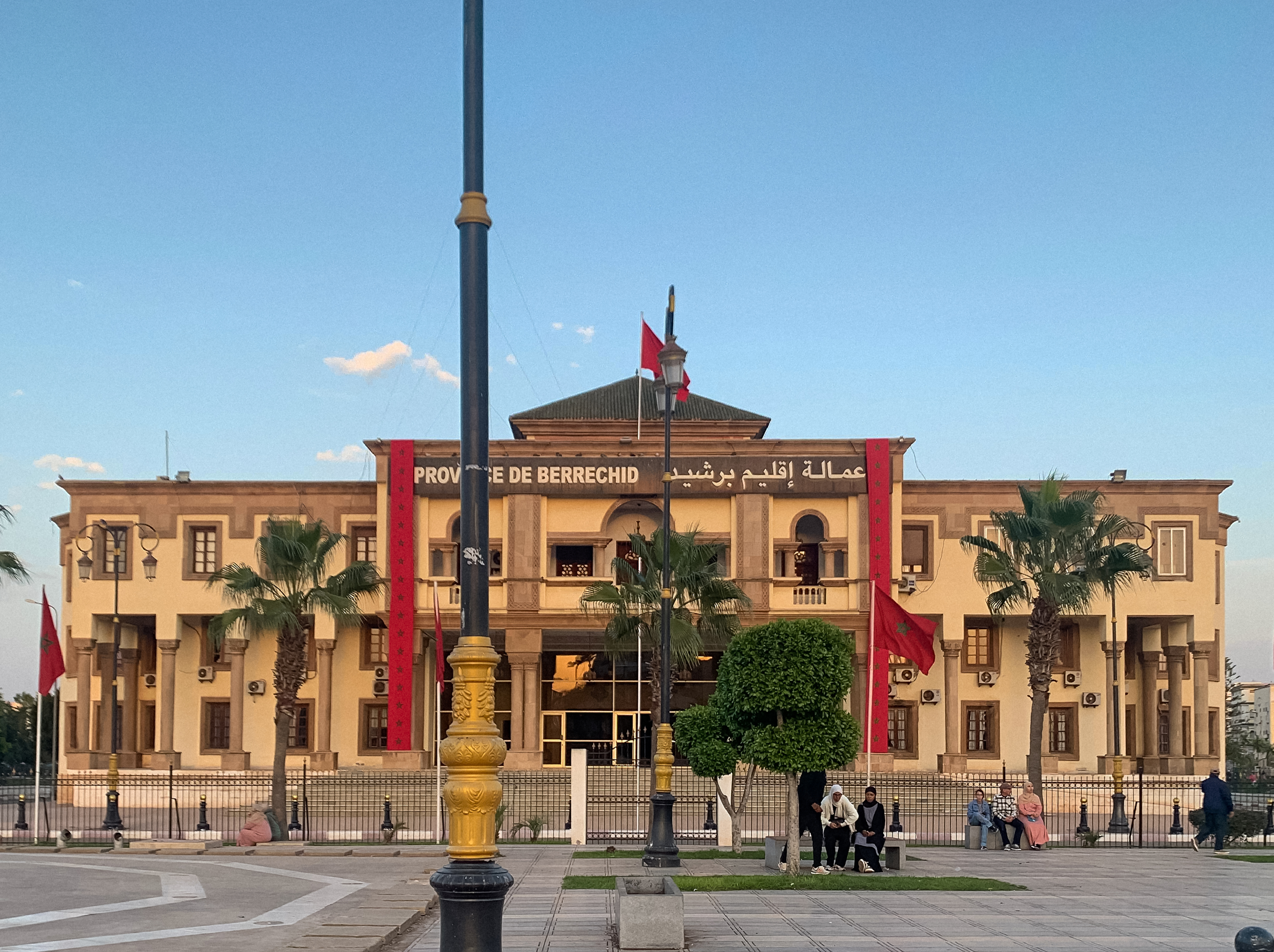
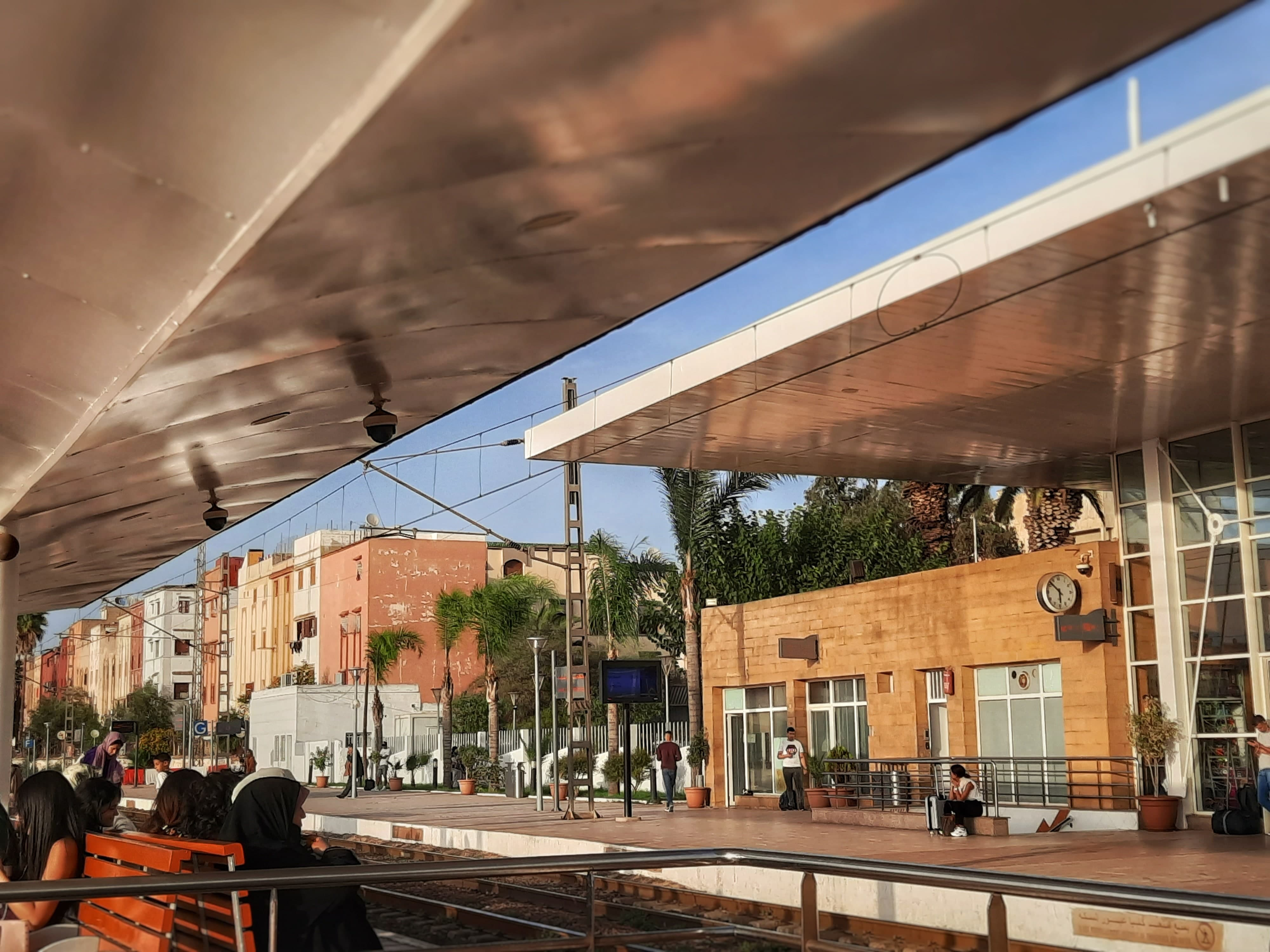
- Interactive map of Berrechid
- Country: Morocco
- Region: Casablanca-Settat
- Province: Berrechid
- Elevation: 213 m (699 ft)

Population (2024)
  - Total: 168,687
  - Rank: 22rd in Morocco
- Time zone: UTC+0 (GMT)

Berrechid (Arabic: برشيد; Standard Moroccan Tamazight: ⴱⵕⵕⵛⵉⴷ) is a city and municipality in Berrechid Province of the Casablanca-Settat region of Morocco. The city is located about 39 kilometres (24 mi) from Ben Ahmed, 34 kilometres (21 mi) from Settat, 32 kilometres (20 mi) south of Casablanca, 196 kilometres (122 mi) from Marrakesh, and 90 kilometres (56 mi) from El Jadida.

It recorded a population of 168,687 inhabitants in the 2024 Moroccan census.

"Berrechid" is also a metonym for Berrechid Hospital, which first opened as a European-style asylum in 1919 under French colonial rule and was the first place for psychiatric treatment in Morocco.
