= Kenitra–Marrakesh high-speed rail line =

High-speed rail line project in Morocco

Overview
- Native name: القطار فائق السرعة القنيطرة–مراكش
- Status: Under construction
- Owner: Morocco
- Locale: Morocco
- Termini: Kenitra Railway Station; Marrakesh Railway Station

Service
- Type: High-speed rail
- Operator: ONCF
- Rolling stock: Euroduplex, Avelia Horizon

History
- Planned opening: 2029

Technical
- Line length: ~430 km (270 mi)
- Track gauge: 1,435 mm (4 ft 8 1/2 in) standard gauge
- Electrification: Overhead line: 25 kV 50 Hz AC; 3,000 V DC
- Operating speed: 320 km/h (199 mph)

The Kenitra–Marrakesh high-speed rail line (Arabic: القطار فائق السرعة القنيطرة–مراكش, romanized: al-qiṭār fā'iq as-sur'a al-qunayṭira–marrākush) is an under construction high-speed rail project in Morocco. It will become an extension of the existing Tangier–Kenitra line marking the second phase in the development of the Moroccan high-speed rail network. It is aimed for completion sometime before the end of 2029 and will reduce travel time between Tangier and Marrakesh to 2 hours and 40 minutes. King Mohammed VI formally launched construction work for the project on 24 April 2025.

The project is managed by the Moroccan National Railways Office (ONCF), and it is part of the broader "Plan Rail Maroc 2040" program, aiming to build a 1,300-kilometer high-speed network and 3,800 kilometers of conventional lines linking Moroccan urban centers, linking 43 agglomerations (compared to the current 23) and 87% of the population (compared to the current 51%).

The line will expand dedicated high-speed infrastructure across Morocco's primary central-western economic corridor, providing high-capacity passenger transport connecting Kenitra, Rabat, Casablanca and Marrakesh. It incorporates high-speed alignments, complex urban underground crossings in Rabat, a dedicated metropolitan passenger bypass around Greater Casablanca, multimodal hub integrations, and an extensive fleet renewal program. It spans 430 kilometers of newly built and realigned railway corridors. The project serves as a pillar for Morocco’s transport commitments as co-host of the 2030 FIFA World Cup.

The program's budget (including RER lines and an HSR extension to Agadir), mobilizes a total investment capital of 134 billion dirhams, increased from 96 billions when the program was launched in April 2025, 53 of which were allocated for infrastructure and equipment related to the Kenitra–Marrakesh line.

== Background ==
Following the successful implementation of the Tangier–Kenitra high speed line, which transported more than 38.5 million passengers in 2019, ONCF launched the Kenitra–Marrakesh high-speed rail line project in 2022, with construction formally launched by King Mohammed VI on 24 April 2025. Morocco's high-speed trains run through a very optimized exploitation model, which allows ONCF to retain a high profit margin similar to those of European operators.

The project also increased in importance following Morocco's successful bid to co-host the 2030 FIFA World Cup alongside Spain and Portugal.

== Route ==
The total length of the line is estimated to be 430 kilometers. The platform provides for a double electrified track under an industrial voltage of 25 kV 50 Hz AC, with a standard gauge of 1.435 meters and modern signaling operated according to either the European level 2 standard or European level 1 standard (still unspecified as of October 2026). The design speed of the track geometry is set at 350 km/h, allowing for regular commercial operation at a speed of 320 km/h for two-level Al Boraq (Euroduplex) trains.

=== Transit impact ===
The line will considerably shorten long-distance travel times along Morocco's main north–south axis.

Travel time reduction after line entry into service
| Line | Conventional Rail Travel Time | High-Speed Target Travel Time |
|---|---|---|
| Tangier–Marrakesh | 5 hours 45 minutes | 2 hours 40 minutes |
| Fez–Marrakesh (via bypass) | 7 hours 10 minutes | 3 hour 45 minutes |
| Marrakesh–Mohammed V Airport | 3 hours 15 minutes | 55 minutes |
| Rabat–Mohammed V Airport | 1 hour 30 minutes | 35 minutes |
| Tangier–Rabat | 1 hour 20 minutes | 1 hour |

=== Kenitra to Rabat segment ===
The Rabat-Agdal railway station, already serviced by Al Boraq.

Starting from the southern terminus of the Tangier–Kenitra high-speed line near the Kenitra maintenance base and the Sidi Ichou junction, the line will extend south towards Rabat. The high-speed tracks will go underground through a 6-km long tunnel, ending at the Bouregreg valley, where two bridges will be built for the line. The lines will then enter a second 3.3-km long tunnel under the city and the Rabat-Ville station until a test ground 1 kilometer away from the Rabat-Agdal station. The high-speed train will go through newly-built Hay Riad station on rare exceptions during important events such as the 2025 Africa Cup of Nations.

=== Rabat to Casablanca segment ===
The line will continue after exiting Rabat-Agdal southward along a dedicated corridor past Aïn Atiq towards Zenata. It will then go underground through a 6-km long tunnel located near the Asment factory, as to avoid existing habitations.

To overcome network chokepoints near Casablanca, a grade-separated high-speed passenger bypass (Casablanca bypass) will be built. This bypass will diverge near Zenata routing high-speed passenger services around Casablanca's urban perimeter toward Mansouria in the Benslimane province. It will stop near the under-construction Hassan II Stadium, providing high-capacity rail connectivity to the 2030 FIFA World Cup venue. It will then curve south toward the newly established multimodal interchange at Nouaceur. This new multimodal southern hub will combine conventional, high-speed and RER lines, and will be built in the vicinity of Mohammed V International Airport, near a future new terminal. Future travelers will be able to choose which route suits them depending on their end destination.

== Construction ==
Earthworks for the line near Douar Aït Hanncha in November 2026.

ONCF divided the main greenfield civil engineering works (earthworks, structures, and fencing from Sidi Ichou to central Marrakesh) into seven main lots awarded by to Chinese, Moroccan, and French-affiliated contractors. Two 100-hectare logistics work bases support track laying: the Kenitra maintenance base (also referred to as the Kenitra North base), which will be expanded by 50 hectares from its original 50-hectare footprint to house concrete sleeper production and steel rail welding factories, and the Benguerir base.

=== Civil engineering and track work packages ===
Civil engineering Lot 1 of the high-speed line, spanning 62–63 km from Sidi Ichou (Kenitra) to Rabat, was awarded to Chinese state-owned contractor China Railway No. 4 Engineering Group (CREC 4) for approximately 3.4 billion Moroccan dirhams (MAD).

The 3.3 km underground railway crossing beneath Rabat (consisting of a 2,750 m single-tube double-track tunnel, a 50 m open-air section, and a 500 m four-track cut-and-cover trench near Rabat-Agdal station) was awarded for 1.4 billion MAD with a 42-month execution timeline to a consortium of SGTM (Morocco) and Sinohydro Bureau 5 (China).

Civil engineering Lot 2, running 64 km between Rabat-Agdal and Zenata, was awarded to Chinese group Shandong Hi-Speed Engineering-Construction for between 4.05 and 4.5 billion MAD.

Civil engineering Lot 3, covering the high-speed Casablanca bypass toward Berrechid across approximately 36–40 km, was awarded to French group Colas via its Moroccan subsidiary Grands Travaux Routiers (GTR) for approximately 2.15 billion MAD (about €180 million).

Civil engineering Lot 3-bis, covering connector earthworks and engineering structures in the Casablanca/Benslimane corridor, was awarded in November 2024 to Moroccan contractor Société de Travaux Agricoles Marocains (STAM) for 2.4 billion MAD under Moroccan national preference rules.

Civil engineering Lot 4, spanning 51 km between Berrechid and Settat, was awarded in September 2024 to Moroccan construction firm Travaux Généraux de Construction de Casablanca (TGCC) for 2.83 billion MAD.

Civil engineering Lot 5, covering 35.4–36 km between Settat and Benguerir (from PK 401+366 to PK 436+800), was awarded to China Railway 20th Bureau Group (CRCC 20) with bids and commitments ranging between 1.8 and 2.83 billion MAD.

Civil engineering Lot 6, covering 60 km of earthworks, engineering structures, and track restoration between Benguerir and Marrakech-Palmeraie, was awarded in October 2024 to Moroccan contractor Jet Contractors for approximately 2.10 billion MAD.

Earthworks for the line near the A301 highway entering Marrakesh.

Civil engineering Lot 7, covering earthworks, structures, communication lines, and fencing on the final approach from the Marrakesh outskirts into the city center, was awarded in October 2024 to Moroccan firm Mojazine for 2.0 billion MAD.

The northern package for track laying, catenaries, work bases, and electrical substations (covering 346 km of single-track equivalent high-speed line and 112 km of regional track) was awarded to Colas Rail in partnership with engineering firm SETEC for approximately €200 million (~2.15 billion MAD).

The southern track, catenary, and electrification package (designated Lot 2 of the track equipment tenders), covering roughly 200 km between Sidi El Aïdi and Marrakesh, was awarded to Italian rail infrastructure specialist Generale Costruzioni Ferroviarie (GCF) as consortium leader alongside Transalp Renouvellement, GCF Elettriche, and GCFMA for €140 million (~1.5 billion MAD). The strategic project management assistance contract (French: assistance à maîtrise d'ouvrage / AMO) for the entire 430 km high-speed corridor was awarded in August 2024 to a French-Moroccan consortium of Egis Rail, Systra, and Novec for 1.385 billion MAD (~€130 million).

Civil engineering, tunneling, and track work packages for the Kenitra–Marrakesh HSR line
| Lot / Package | Section / Scope | Length | Contractor(s) | Country | Contract Value | Award Date |
|---|---|---|---|---|---|---|
| Civil Lot 1 | Sidi Ichou (Kenitra) – Rabat | 62 km (39 mi) | China Railway No. 4 Engineering Group (CREC 4) | China | 3.40 billion MAD | 2024 |
| Rabat Tunnel | Rabat underground crossing (2,750 m double-track tunnel + 500 m four-track trench) | 3.3 km (2.1 mi) | SGTM – Sinohydro consortium | Morocco / China | ~1.40 billion MAD | May 2025 |
| Civil Lot 2 | Rabat-Agdal – Zenata | 64 km (40 mi) | Shandong Hi-Speed Engineering-Construction | China | 4.05–4.50 billion MAD | 2024 |
| Civil Lot 3 | Casablanca Bypass – Berrechid | 36 km (22 mi) | Grands Travaux Routiers (GTR, Colas subsidiary) | France / Morocco | 2.15 billion MAD (€180M) | 2024 / Jan 2025 |
| Civil Lot 3-bis | Greater Casablanca / Benslimane connector earthworks & structures | — | Société de Travaux Agricoles Marocains (STAM) | Morocco | 2.40 billion MAD | Nov 2024 |
| Civil Lot 4 | Berrechid – Settat | 51 km (32 mi) | Travaux Généraux de Construction de Casablanca (TGCC) | Morocco | 2.83 billion MAD | Sep 2024 |
| Civil Lot 5 | Settat – Benguerir (PK 401+366 to 436+800) | 35.4 km (22.0 mi) | China Railway 20th Bureau Group (CRCC 20) | China | 1.80–2.83 billion MAD | Oct 2024 |
| Civil Lot 6 | Benguerir – Marrakech-Palmeraie | 60 km (37 mi) | Jet Contractors | Morocco | 2.10 billion MAD | Oct 2024 |
| Civil Lot 7 | Marrakech-Palmeraie – Marrakech-Guéliz | — | Mojazine | Morocco | 2.00 billion MAD | Oct 2024 |
| Track & Catenary North | Kenitra – Sidi El Aïdi track, catenary & substations | 346 km (215 mi) (single-track eq.) | Colas Rail – SETEC | France | ~2.15 billion MAD (€200M) | Jan 2025 |
| Track & Catenary South (Lot 2) | Sidi El Aïdi – Marrakesh track & electrification | ~200 km (120 mi) | Generale Costruzioni Ferroviarie (GCF) consortium | Italy | Undisclosed | 2025 |
| Project Management (AMO) | Overall project management assistance | 430 km (270 mi) | Egis Rail – Systra – Novec | France / Morocco | 1.385 billion MAD | Aug 2024 |
