= High-speed rail in Morocco =

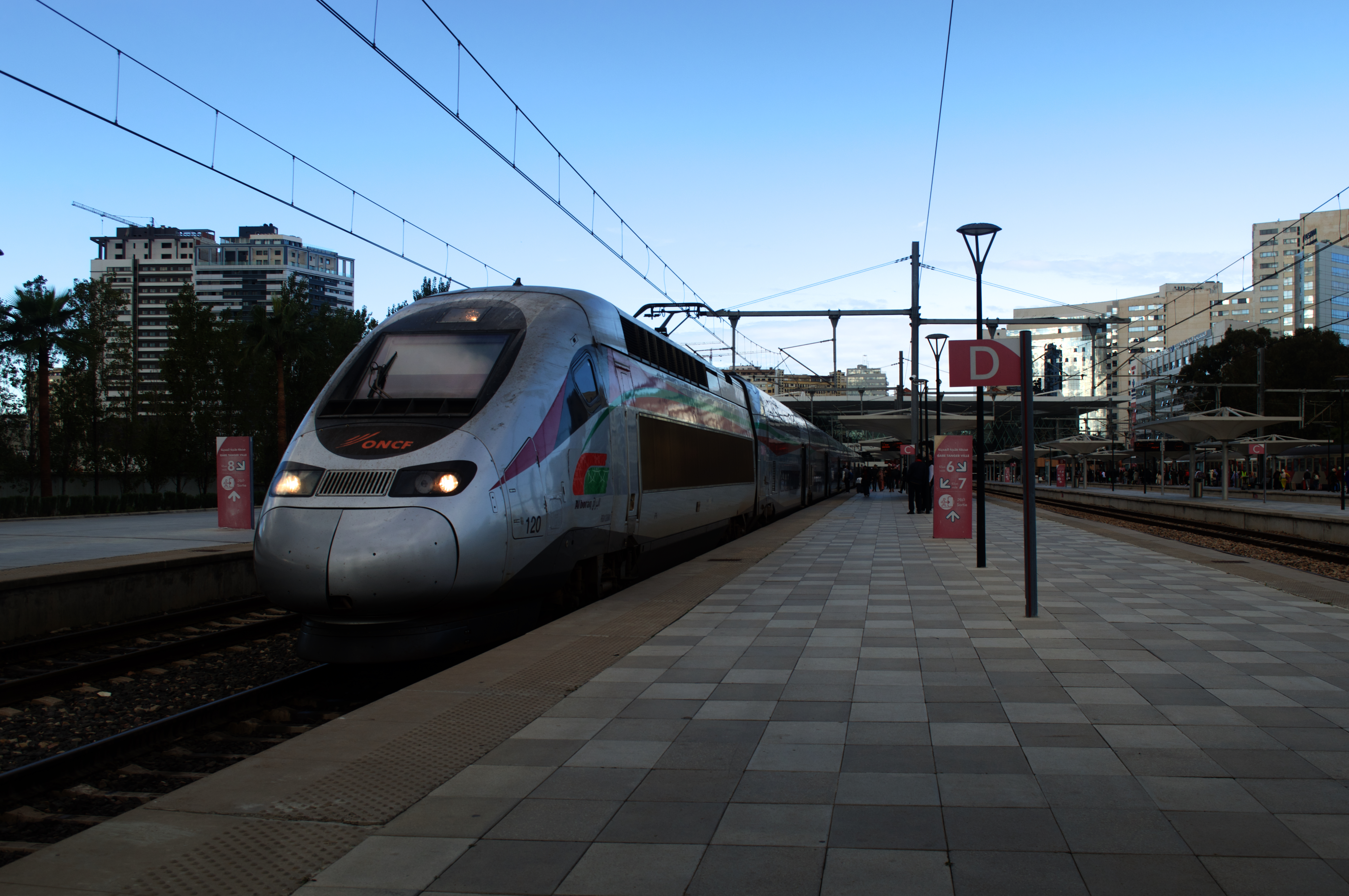
A Al Boraq Alstom Euroduplex at Tangier's Tanger-Ville Railway Terminal

Morocco's high-speed rail network was created when the Al Boraq service commenced in 2018. The Al Boraq and other conventional passenger rail services are operated by Morocco's national railway operator ONCF (from French: Office National des Chemins de Fer). Al Boraq runs on a 323 km (201 mi) line that connects the Moroccan cities of Tangier and Casablanca via Rabat, with a 186 km (116 mi) segment that enables speeds up to 320 km/h (200 mph). As of March 2025 the Kenitra – Tangier high-speed rail line is the only high-speed rail line in the country, with an extension to Marrakesh and high speed track to Rabat and Casablanca expected to be completed by 2030. Under the 2040 Rail Strategy a total of 1,100 km (680 mi) of high-speed rail is planned. These future projects would link the cities of Agadir, Fez, and Oujda to the nationwide network.

The Al Boraq service is the first high-speed rail service on the African continent, and as of March 2025 it is the only high-speed rail service in Africa until the completion of Egypt's high-speed rail project.

== Rolling stock ==
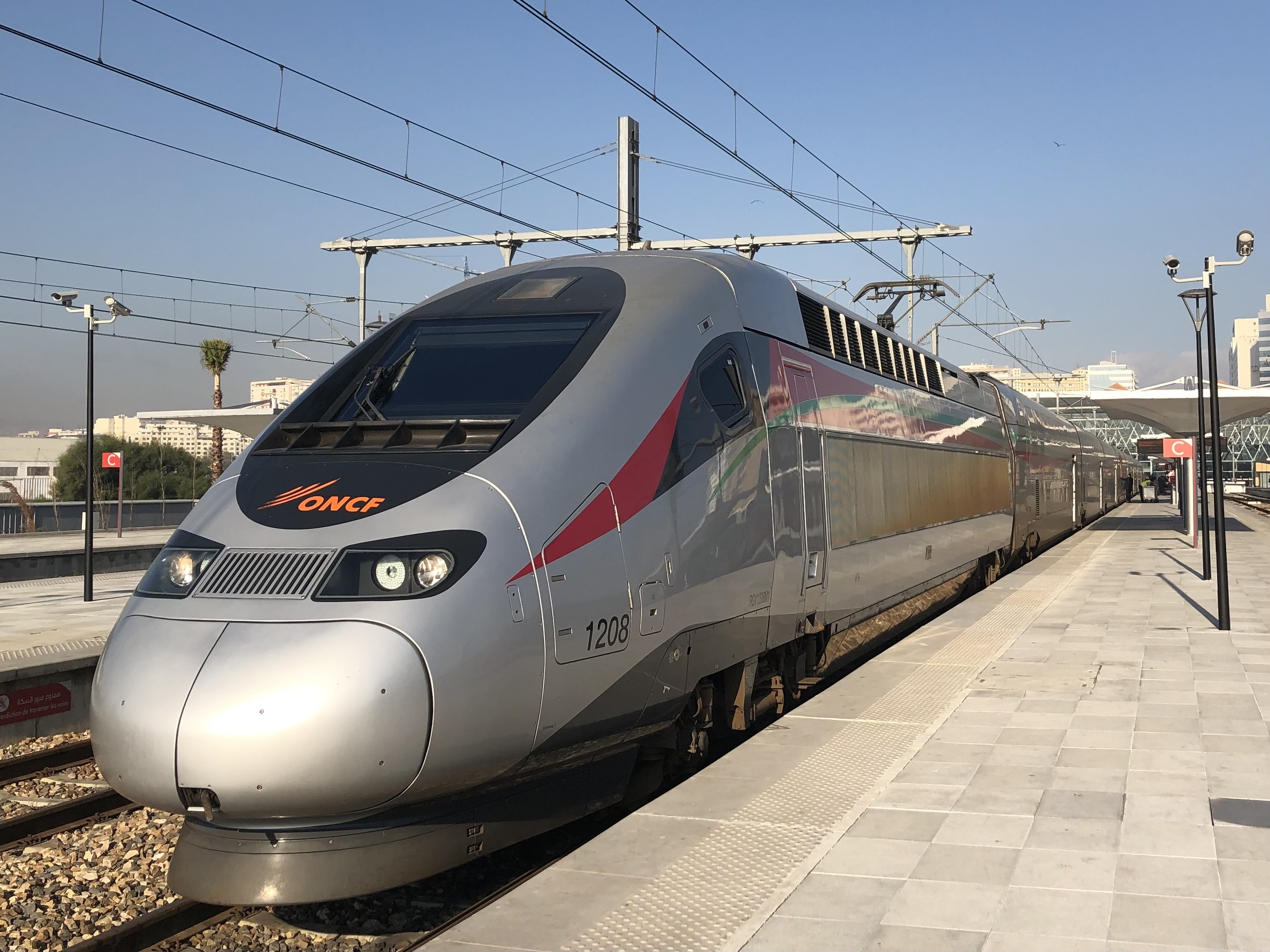
ONCF Alstom Euroduplex (Al Boraq)

High-speed service is provided by ONCF with its Al Boraq service. Currently there is only one type of high-speed train operating in Morocco although there are orders for more:

- Alstom Euroduplex: operates at speeds up to 320 km/h (200 mph) in service and it's electrified at 25 kV and 3 kV. ONCF currently operates 12 train sets in a configuration of 2 first-class, 5 second-class, and a catering coach. Each train can carry 533 passengers.
- Alstom Avelia Horizon: it is planned to reach a top speed of 320 km/h (200 mph) in service. ONCF currently has 18 of these train sets on order with deliveries starting in 2027. These additional train sets will help add service when the extension to Marrakesh opens.

== Lines in operation ==
Map of the Morocco high-speed rail network as of April 2025

Currently there is only one high-speed rail line of which only 186 km (116 mi) is considered actual high-speed rail. This section is the first phase of a planned Atlantic line which would eventually run from Tangier to Agadir.

| Line | Connecting cities | Opening date | Travel time | Top speed | Length |
|---|---|---|---|---|---|
| Tangier-Kenitra high-speed rail line | Tangier · Kenitra | 15 November 2018 | 0h45 | 320 km/h (200 mph) | 186 km (116 mi) |

=== Casablanca — Tangier Corridor ===
The Casablanca to Tangier line is currently the only line in Morocco which facilitates true high speed rail. This rail line is made up of two sections. The 186 km (116 mi) section which sees a top speed of 320 km/h (199 mph) is a newly built rail line between Tangier and Kenitra. Between Kenitra and Casablanca the Al Boraq service runs on conventional rail line with a top speed of 160 km/h (99 mph). High-speed services on the conventional portion is planned to be replaced by an all new rail line operating at a speed of 320 km/h (200 mph) which is due to open by 2030.

The opening of the high-speed section reduced the travel time from Tangier to Casablanca to 1h30 down from a previous 4h45.

== Lines under construction ==
| Line | Connecting cities | Opening date | Travel time | Top speed | Length |
|---|---|---|---|---|---|
| Kenitra-Marrakesh high-speed rail line | Kenitra · Rabat · Casablanca · Marrakesh | 2029 | 2h00 | 320 km/h (200 mph) | 430 km (267 mi) |

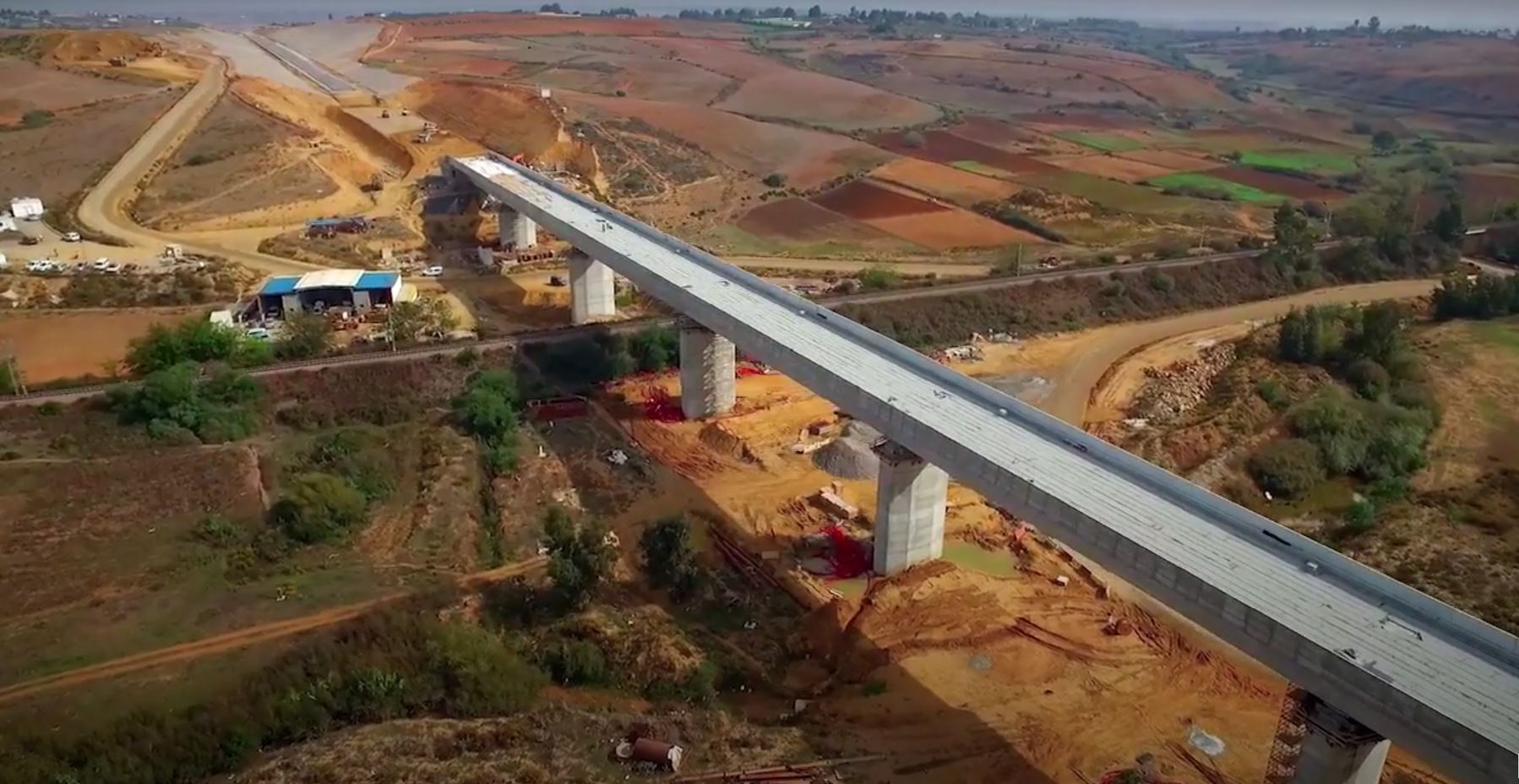
A bridge under construction on the Tangier-Casablanca line

A high-speed line completing the Casablanca — Tangier corridor and extending to Marrakesh has been mostly tendered out as of April 2025 and construction is expected to begin imminently. The project was officially launched by King Mohammed VI on 24 April. With the completion of the project the cities of Tangier and Marrakesh will have travel time of 2 hours and 40 minutes, down by 2 hours. The project includes a 35 minute connection to Mohammed V International Airport from Rabat. Construction of the line is expected to be completed for an amount of 53 billion MAD. This 430 km line will be built double tracked electrified with it being designed for speeds up to 350 km/h (217 mph), although only speeds up to 320 km/h (200 mph) will be used in service. As part of the project a 3.3 km (2 mi) tunnel will be built in Rabat connecting Sale and Rabat-Agdal station.

== Lines planned ==
Currently, only the lines to Agadir and Fez are in the planning or feasibility study phase. The extension to Oujda is considered part of a future expansion but is not yet under active planning or study.

| Line | Connecting cities | Opening date | Travel time | Top speed | length |
|---|---|---|---|---|---|
| Marrakesh-Agadir high-speed rail line | Marrakesh · Chichaoua · Agadir | TBD | 1h00 | 320 km/h (200 mph) | 239 km (149 mi) |
| Rabat-Fez high-speed rail line | Rabat · Meknes · Fez | TBD | TBD | 320 km/h ( 200 mph) | 150 - 216 km (93-134 mi) |
| Fez-Oujda high-speed rail line | Fez · Taza · Taourirt · Oujda | TBD | TBD | 320 km/h (200 mph) | TBD |

=== Marrakesh to Agadir Corridor ===
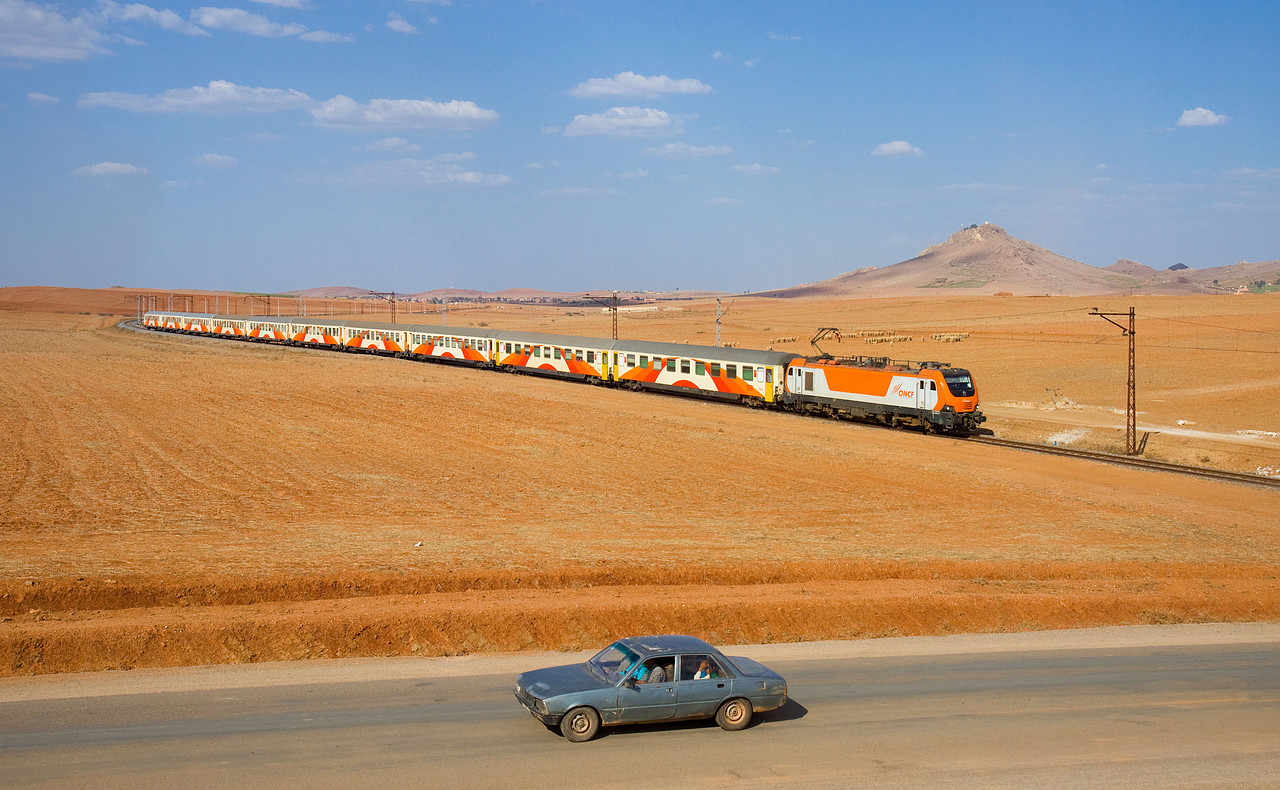
Al Atlas train service operating between Rabat and Marrakesh

A line from Marrakesh to Agadir is currently in the planning phase and land procurement has already begun. ONCF have also announced that the high-speed line will have a stop at Chichaoua, a small town of less than 16,000. Originally the line was meant to extend to the resort town of Essaouira. However, due to the economics of the proposed project and the difficult terrain of the area the extension plans will not be moving forward. Instead it is proposed that Essaouira and Chichaoua be connected by a 200 km/h (124 mph) service such as a inter-city train service like the Al Atlas. Currently both Agadir and Essaouira are served by bus services operated by Morocco's national bus carrier, Supratours, a subsidiary of ONCF.

=== Rabat to Oujda Corridor ===
A proposed high-speed rail line from Rabat to Fez via Meknes is undergoing feasibility studies. Currently there are no further studies for line extensions from Fez, however ONCF have announced the intent to build a line all the way up to Oujda connecting the cities of Taza and Taourirt along the way. The axis starting from Rabat has been dubbed the Maghreb line. There have also been talks of eventually expanding the line into nearby Algeria and its capital city of Algiers which would then connect to Tunis in Tunisia. This extension would cut the travel time between Casablanca and Tunis down from 48 to under 25 hours. The construction of the high-speed line would closely follow the current conventional rail line that stretches from Kenitra to Oujda. It is currently not know if the line to Meknes would start from Kenitra or Rabat. The route is currently served by long distance and sleeper train services.

=== Morocco to Spain Connection ===
Despite the Strait of Gibraltar being just 14 km or 9 miles wide at its narrowest point, no rail connection across it exists. Despite this, a crossing between Spain and Morocco remains a "strategic project" for both nations. The crossing would be similar to that of the Channel Tunnel linking the UK and France but would be significantly deeper. As of January 2025, Spain has contracted a company to complete a feasibility study into a project with it expected to be completed in June of the same year. The link would span from Cadiz in Spain to Tangier in Morocco.
