= Marrakesh–Agadir high-speed rail line =

High-speed rail line project in Morocco

Overview
- Native name: خط القطار فائق السرعة مراكش–أكادير
- Status: Land acquisition phase
- Owner: ONCF
- Termini: Marrakesh; Agadir
- Continues from: Marrakesh
- Stations: 3

Service
- Operator: ONCF
- Rolling stock: Euroduplex

History
- Work began: 2026

Technical
- Line length: 230–240 km (140–150 mi)
- Num of tracks: 2
- Track gauge: 1,435 mm (4 ft 8 1/2 in) standard gauge
- Electrification: Overhead line: 25 kV 50 Hz AC; 3,000 V DC
- Operating speed: 320 km/h (200 mph)
- Signalling: ETCS

The Marrakesh–Agadir high-speed rail line (Arabic: خط القطار فائق السرعة مراكش–أكادير, Standard Moroccan Tamazight: ⴰⴱⵔⵉⴷ ⵓⵍⴰⵡⴰⵢ ⵉⵜⵜⴰⵣⵣⵍⵏ ⴱⴰⵀⵔⴰ ⵎⵕⵕⴰⴽⵛ–ⵓⴳⴰⴷⵉⵔ), is a planned high-speed rail project that aims to link Marrakesh and Agadir to the rest of the Moroccan high-speed rail network.

It aims to reduce travel time between the two cities from around 3 hours using the current highway to 1 hour using the new high-speed rail line. The project is part of Morocco's broader strategy to expand its high-speed rail network, following the successful implementation of the Tangier–Kenitra high-speed line. This will be the first time Agadir is connected to the Moroccan rail network.

A secondary upgraded line to Essaouira is also planned, which will connect the coastal city to Marrakesh and the rest of the Moroccan rail network in 1 hour, compared to the current travel time of 3 hours by road. However, it will not be a high-speed line, but rather an upgraded conventional line capable of reaching speeds up to 200 km/h.

The line is part of a broader 2030–2035 rail development plan announced by the El Mansouri government in October 2026, but no precise timeline or scheduled date for the project was announced. Technical studies concluded and land acquisition began in September 2026.

== Background ==
Since the inauguration of the line connecting Casablanca to Marrakesh in 1928, Marrakesh has remained the southernmost point of the Moroccan railway network. Agadir, whose agglomeration exceeded one million inhabitants during the 2014 census, and with it Souss-Massa and the rest of Southern Morocco, remained disconnected from the national rail network.

The Casablanca–Agadir expressway, opened in 2010, helped open up Agadir but the lack of train line was often labeled as an anomaly and economically detrimental. In a 2019 speech, King Mohammed VI formally called for the study of a rail line between Agadir and Marrakesh, within the framework of an eventual extension to the south. This project is part of a larger railway expansion program (Plan Rail Maroc 2040) that aims to link 43 agglomerations (compared to the current 23) and 87% of the population (compared to the current 51%), through the construction of 1,300 new kilometers of high-speed rail lines and 1,600 new kilometers of conventional rail lines, for an estimated budget of 375–400 billion dirhams. A high-speed rail line was chosen because conventional lines are not financially viable anymore according to ONCF.

== Route ==
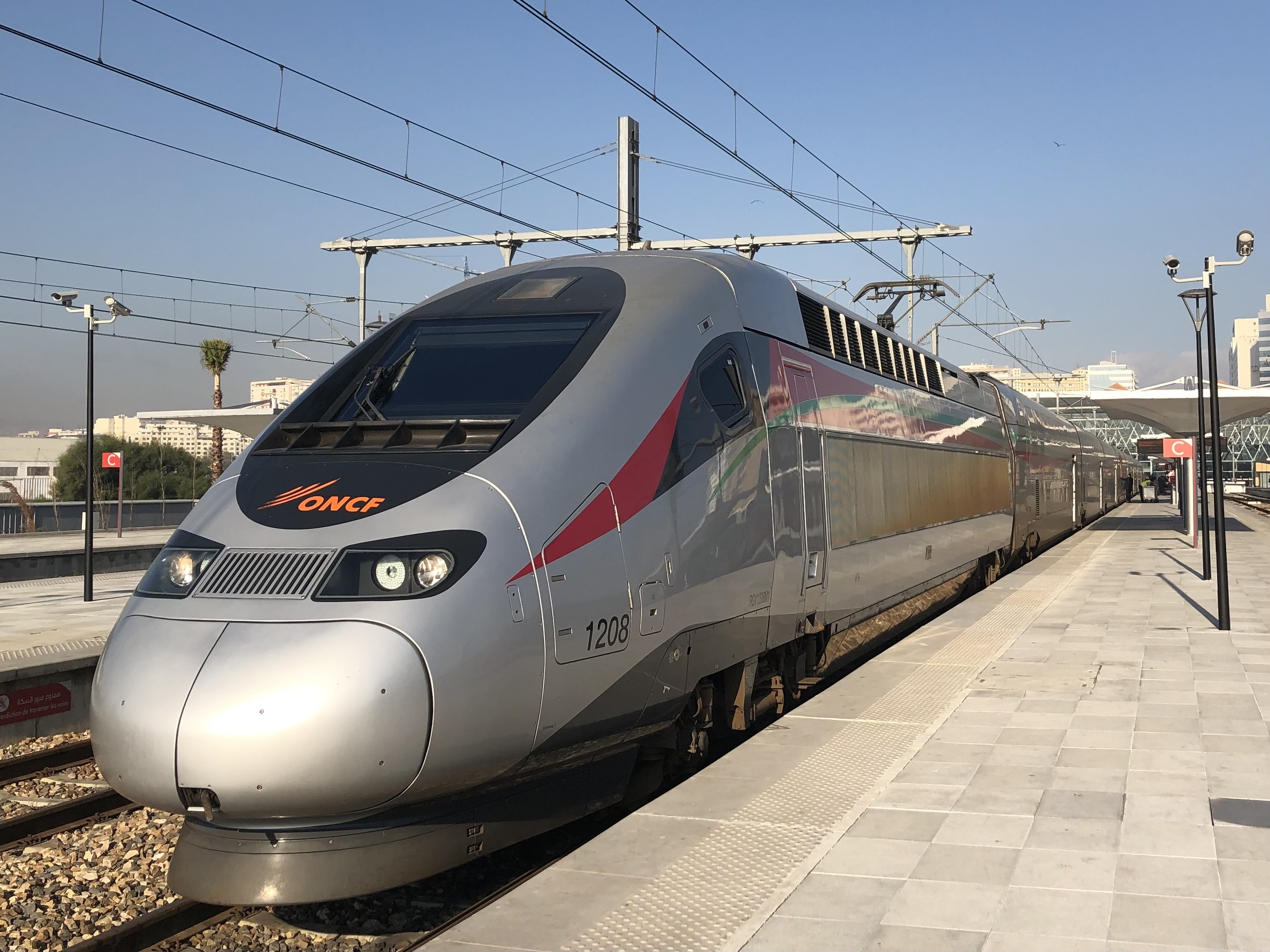
The Al Boraq train planned for operation along the line.

The total length of the line is estimated to be between 230 and 240 kilometers (depending on the final chosen route variants). The platform provides for a double electrified track under an industrial voltage of 25 kV 50 Hz AC, with a standard gauge of 1.435 meters and modern signaling operated according to the European level 2 standard. The design speed of the track geometry is set at 350 km/h, allowing for regular commercial operation at a speed of 320 km/h for two-level Al Boraq (Euroduplex) trains. The line will also be open to rail freight transport at 100 km/h.

The route crosses the administrative areas of the prefecture of Marrakesh, the province of Chichaoua, and the prefecture of Agadir Ida-Outanane. It includes a bifurcation located at Chichaoua to connect Essaouira. Operational decisions establish that the Chichaoua-Essaouira railway branch will be operated as a "High-Performance Train" running up to 200 km/h, allowing for a travel time of about one hour between Marrakesh and Essaouira. The line to Agadir will go through the High Atlas mountains.

In February 2024, the leader of the delegation of the China Design Railway Corporation (CRDC) communicated the new train stations planned for construction in the framework of this high-speed rail line: the Sidi Zouine railway station, the Chichaoua railway station and the Agadir railway station along the main line. The Essaouira railway station is also planned for construction after the bifurcation.

== Plans and construction ==
=== Early studies ===
Fierce competition initially existed between French, Chinese and South Korean companies, and early studies were awarded to the China Railway Design Corporation cabinet. Early plans considered bypassing the High Atlas mountains by connecting Agadir directly through Essaouira, but the plan was rejected in December 2020 in favor of the High Atlas corridor route, 25 billion dirhams cheaper according to former Moroccan minister of transport and logistic Mohamed Abdeljalil.

=== Construction ===
A map of the Western High Atlas, where the majority of the construction work will be done.

In May 2026, the Moroccan ministry of transport and logistics announced that all preliminary studies were completed, and that almost 70% of all construction work will be done in the High Atlas mountain range, including viaduct construction and 37 kilometers of tunnels.

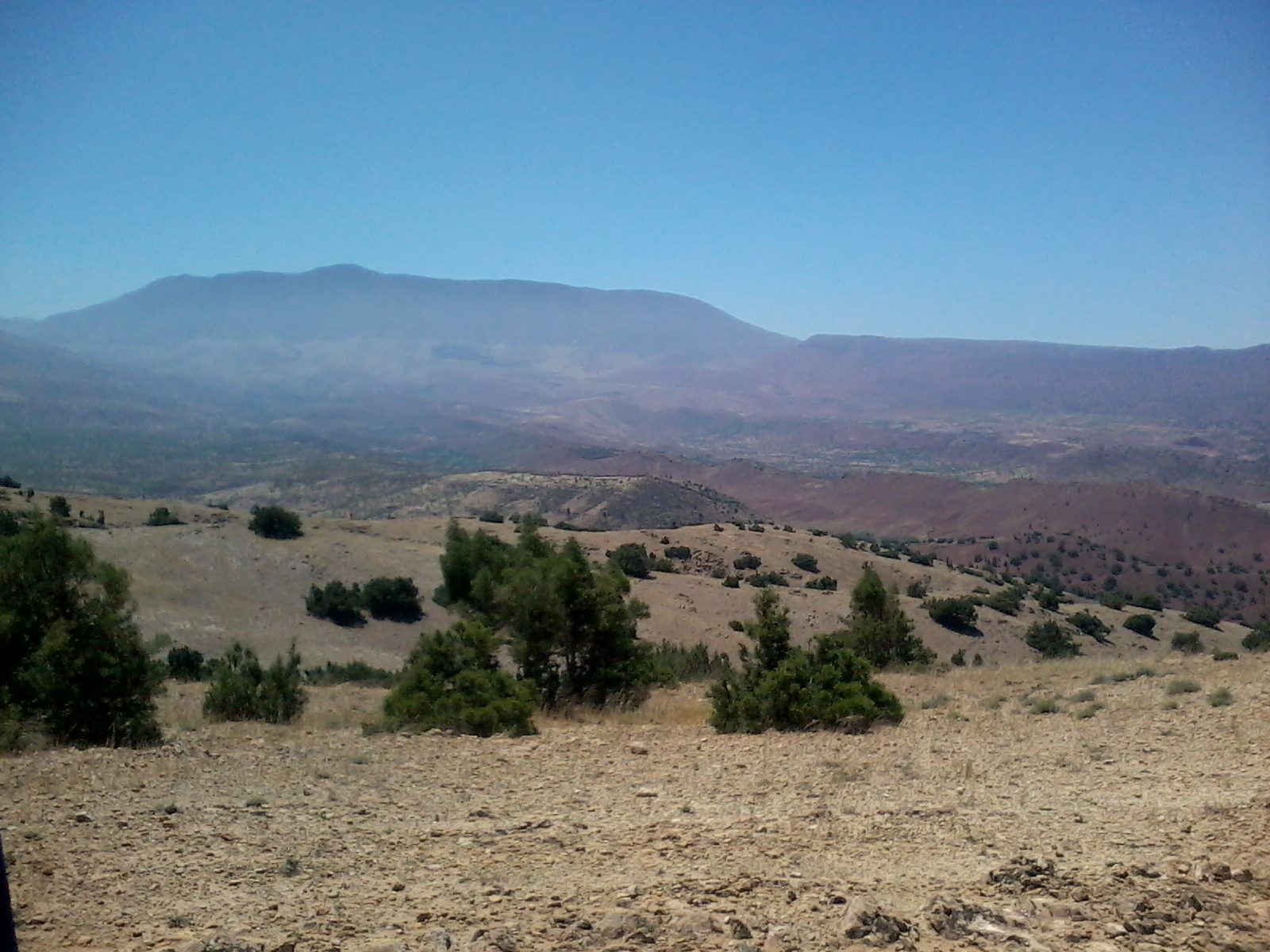
A view of the High Atlas range, taken from the vicinity of Argana

In September 2026, the government published an executive decree officially recognizing the Marrakesh–Agadir rail line and the Chichaoua-Essaouira branch line as being in the public interest, allowing the state to expropriate terrains for the construction of these two lines. However, it did not specify either the timeline for the construction work or the scheduled date for the future lines to begin operations, although the project initially planned to link all Moroccan host cities of the 2030 FIFA World Cup (Agadir being one of them) to the national rail network before the start of the event, and some reports claimed the line was to be completed by 2025.

=== Railway stations ===
==== Agadir passenger and freight railway stations ====
In February 2020, a decree allowed terrain expropriation for the construction of the future Agadir railway station in the Hay Mohammadi district, covering 4 hectares of surface area. In May 2020, a decree allowed terrain expropriation for an additional 16 hectares of terrain, bringing the future station's total footprint to 20 hectares. A freight-only railway station is also planned. A 10 km corridor was allocated for the construction of the line inside the city.

==== Chichaoua railway station ====
The future Chichaoua railway station will act as a splitting point for the coastal branch to Essaouira, where trains capable of speeds up to 200 km/h will link the two cities.
