= Setec =

Setec may refer to:

- Setec (Company of Finland), the former Bank of Finland's banknote printer.
- Société d'études techniques et économiques, a French engineering company.
