= Ministry of Equipment and Transport =

Ministry of Equipment and Transport may refer to:

- Ministry of Equipment and Transport (Belgium), a former ministry in Belgium
- Ministry of Equipment and Transport (Morocco)
- Ministry of Equipment and Transport (Mali)

See also:

- Ministry of Transport
