= Moroccan Agency for Logistics Development =

Moroccan government agency for logistics sector development

- Agence Marocaine de Développement de la Logistique (French) الوكالة المغربية لتنمية الأنشطة اللوجيستيكية (Arabic) ⵜⴰⵙⵏⵓⵔⴰⵢⵜ ⵜⴰⵎⵖⵔⵉⴱⵉⵜ ⵏ ⵜⴳⵎⵉ ⴷ ⵜⵍⵓⵊⵉⵙⵜⵉⵜ (Standard Moroccan Tamazight)
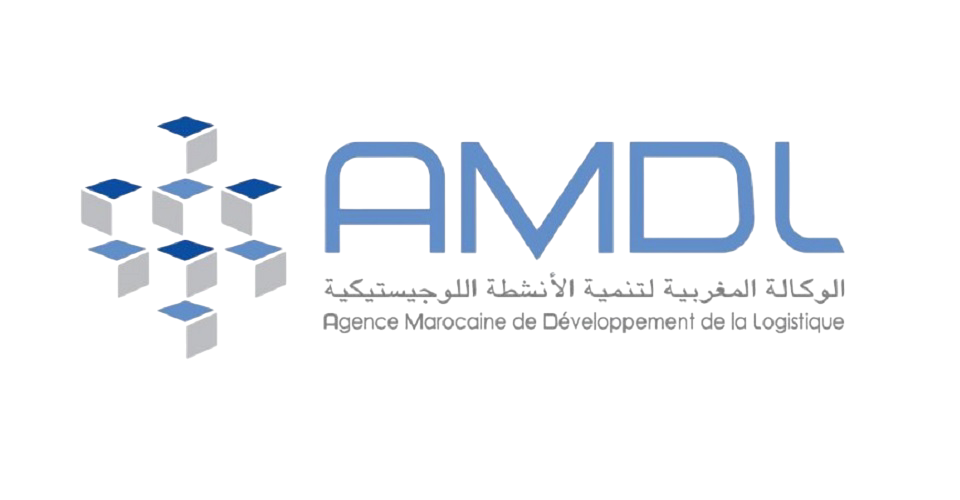

Agency overview
- Formed: 2011; 15 years ago
- Jurisdiction: Morocco
- Headquarters: Rabat, Morocco
- Annual budget: 660 million MAD (2026)
- Agency executive: Ghassane El Machrafi, Director General
- Parent agency: Ministry of Transport and Logistics
- Website: www.amdl.gov.ma

The Moroccan Agency for Logistics Development (Arabic: الوكالة المغربية لتنمية الأنشطة اللوجيستيكية, French: Agence Marocaine de Développement de la Logistique; AMDL) is a public institution responsible for coordinating and implementing the national logistics strategy in Morocco. Established in 2011, the agency aims to enhance the competitiveness of the national economy by reducing logistics costs and improving supply chain efficiency.

== See also ==
- Economy of Morocco
- National Ports Agency (Morocco)
- Transport in Morocco
