= Rabat-Agdal Station =

Railway station in Morocco

Rabat-Agdal محطة الرباط أكدال
- Passenger building, opened 2018

General information
- Location: Agdal, Rabat; Morocco
- Coordinates: 34.0013°N 6.8575°W
- Owner: ONCF
- Operator: ONCF
- Line: Tangier - Casablanca

History
- Opened: 1925

Services
Preceding station		Following station
Kenitra towards Tanger-Ville Terminal	Al-Boraq	Casa-Voyageurs Terminus
Al Boraq
Trains Grande Ligne
TNR
Le Bouregreg
Location

Rabat-Agdal train station (Arabic : محطة الرباط أكدال) is located in the Agdal district, in Rabat, Morocco. It was first renovated in 2004, before undergoing a major redevelopment in the 2010s to accommodate the Al Boraq high-speed service.

== History ==
The station was originally built in 1925..

It was rebuilt to accommodate the Al Boraq service in 2018.

== Passenger service ==
=== Train services ===
The station is notably served by the Al Boraq high-speed service.

=== Intermodal connections ===
The station is served by buses from the ALSA-City Bus network:

- Along the Avenue Haj Ahmed Cherkaoui - lines 30 (Trambus) and 35;
- Along the Avenue Hassan II - lines 31, 32, 33, 34, 34B, 36, 38, 101 and 106.

=== See also ===
- Le Bouregreg, railway network of the Rabat metropolitan area
- Rail transport in Morocco
