= Thame Valley Viaduct =

- Coordinates: 51.8237°N 0.8633°W
- OS grid reference: SP784145
- Carries: High Speed 2
- Crosses: River Thame
- Locale: Aylesbury, Buckinghamshire, England

Characteristics
- Material: Concrete
- Total length: 880 m (2,890 ft)
- Width: 12 m (39 ft)
- Height: 3 m (9.8 ft) (ground to underside of the deck)
- No. of spans: 36

Rail characteristics
- No. of tracks: 2
- Track gauge: 1,435 mm (4 ft 8 1/2 in)
- Electrified: 25 kV 50 Hz AC

History
- Architect: Moxon Architects
- Designer: ASC (Arcadis, Setec and COWI)
- Constructed by: EKFB (Eiffage, Kier, Ferrovial Construction and BAM Nuttall)
- Construction end: 2025

The Thame Valley Viaduct is a viaduct which will carry the High Speed 2 railway line in the United Kingdom. It traverses the River Thame near Aylesbury in Buckinghamshire.

As early as February 2020, specific consultancies regarding the viaduct have been conducted. A competitive tender for its construction was undertaken during mid-2021. During April 2022, the final design for the viaduct was revealed. It is to be constructed by a joint venture of Eiffage, Kier, Ferrovial Construction and BAM Nuttall, collectively called EKFB.

The viaduct shall be largely pre-fabricated and assembled onsite; this approach is claimed to save time and money, while also aiming to reduce any impact upon the local community. Measures to minimise and mitigate the auditory and visual presence of the structure have been incorporated into the design. Once completed, the viaduct will have a length of 880 metres (2,890 feet) across its evenly-spaced 36 spans, while only having a height of 3 m (9.8 ft). It is intended to be an aesthetically pleasing structure, making use of modern construction techniques and innovations from international high speed railway projects.

== Location and history ==
The planned route for the High Speed 2 railway line crosses the flood plain of the River Thame near Aylesbury in Buckinghamshire; it was decided that a viaduct would be the optimal means to crossing both the river and the surrounding wetlands. The affected area has not been accessible to the public, largely comprising grazing farmland interspersed with ditches, hedgerows, and occasional trees. It is visible from a mid-distance from several rights of way. Public consultancies specific to the proposed viaduct have been conducted since as early as February 2020. On 14 May 2021, a competitive tender for the viaduct's construction was launched, and was closed on 4 June 2021.

During April 2022, the final design for the viaduct was revealed. It was designed by the architecture company, Moxon, in conjunction with the ASC joint venture, comprising Arcadis, Setec and COWI A/S; construction will undertaken by a joint venture of Eiffage, Kier, Ferrovial Construction and BAM Nuttall, collectively referred to as EKFB. Precast beams for the viaduct, deck slabs, parapets and 68 piers were cast by Pacadar UK, at their factory on the Isle of Grain, Kent.

== Design ==
The completed structure will have a length of 880 m (2,890 ft) across 36 spans, each 25 m (82 ft) long, while sitting 3 metres (9.8 feet) above ground. Lessons from the construction of high-speed railway infrastructure in Spain was a reported influence on the design. Efforts were also made to make the viaduct aesthetically pleasing; to minimise its presence, it is set intentionally low into the landscape and additional planting has been proposed to better hide the structure. Measures to mitigate and minimise the noise generated by high speed trains traversing it have also been incorporated, such as modular noise barriers; other dampening measures have also been evaluated.

The viaduct has been designed so that every major structural element can be manufactured off-site and assembled from these pre-fabricated sections, an approach that is claimed by the construction consortium to have made its construction carbon neutral. This extends to the 35 concrete piers that support the structure, each of which comprise two pier stems that rest upon a pile cap. It uses two wide ‘box girder’ beams per span instead of eight smaller beams, to simplify and speed up assembly. Unlike conventional beams, which are secured together above each piers with the aid of a concrete diaphragm, these precast beams are larger and can be secured directly to one another, eliminating the diaphragm, providing for greater durability and reliability while reducing the time, cost, and labour involved. New Civil Engineer has praised the approach as "a game-changer for the industry".

Furthermore, the viaduct's design was optimised to consume less materials, such as concrete and steel, to construct. This approach was also applied to the construction process itself, it is promoted as producing less waste and requiring less deliveries by trucks, thereby reducing the impact of construction on the local community. Work onsite shall be largely performed via a causeway that shall run parallel to the completed structure.
