= Le Bouregreg =

Rapid transit system in Morocco

Le Bouregreg is a rapid transit system serving Rabat, the capital of Morocco, and the nearby city of Salé. it commenced construction in 2008. Start operations in 2012.

== Stations ==
- Temara
- Rabat-Agdal
- Rabat-Ville
- Salé-Ville
- Salé-Tabriquet
- Sidi Bouknadel

== Map ==
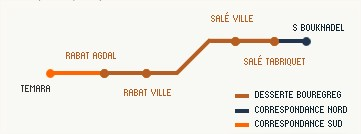
Le Bouregrag (Rabat & suburd rapid rail transit)
