= Euroduplex =

French high-speed train

Avelia Euroduplex
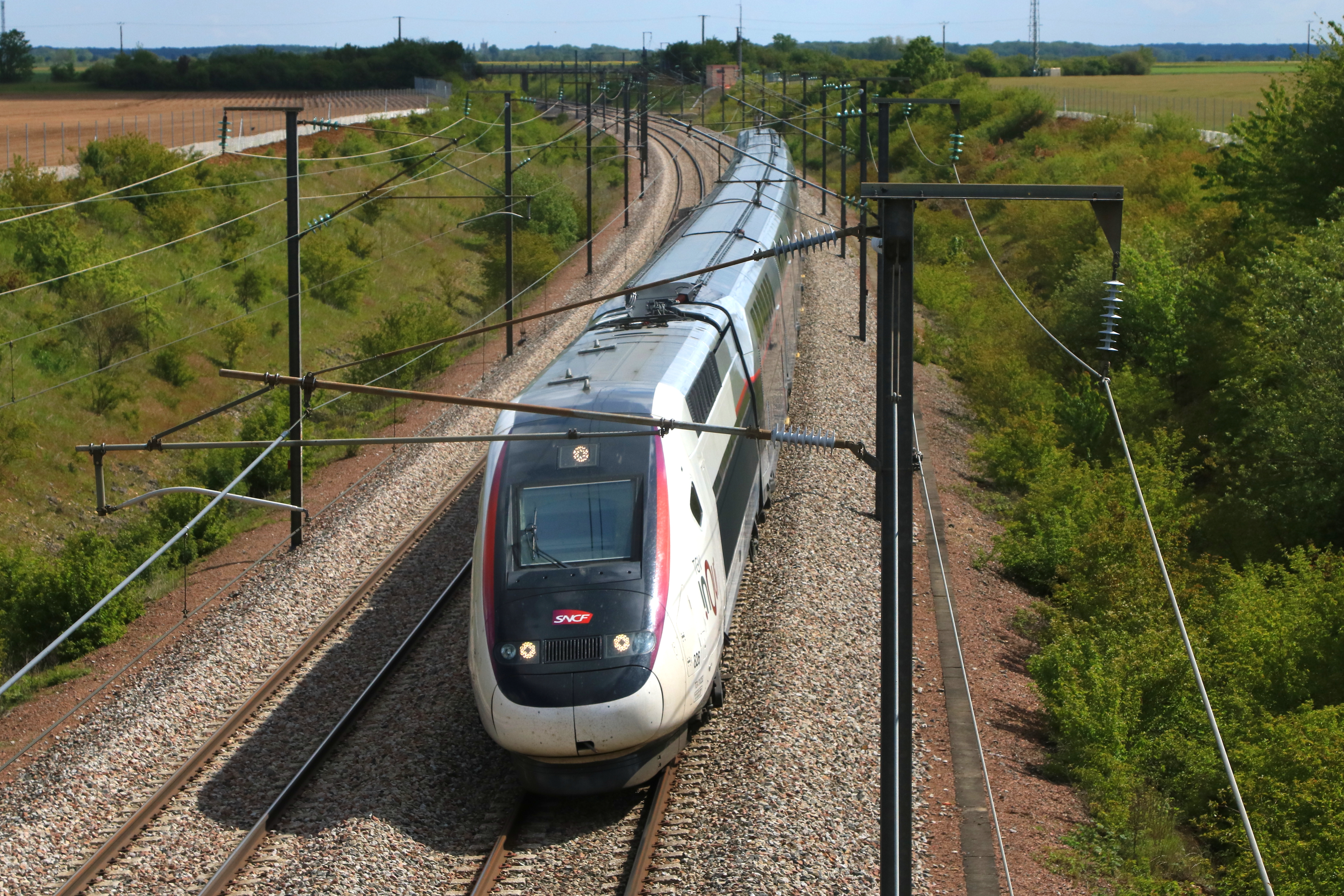
- Euroduplex at Boinville-le-Gaillard on the LGV Atlantique
- Stock type: High-speed trainset
- In service: 2011–present
- Manufacturer: Alstom
- Family name: Avelia · TGV
- Constructed: 2011–2023
- Entered service: 2011–present (SNCF); 2018–present (ONCF)
- Number built: 134 trainsets
- Number in service: 134 trainsets (+2 power cars) (122 SNCF, 12 ONCF) (as of April 2023)
- Formation: 10 cars (2 power cars + 8 trailers)
- Fleet numbers: 801-893, 4701-4730 (SNCF); 1201-1212 (ONCF)
- Capacity: 509 seats (SNCF, 55 trainsets); 556 seats (SNCF, 67 trainsets); 533 seats (ONCF)
- Operators: SNCF; ONCF

Specifications
- Train length: 200.19 m (656 ft 9 in)
- Car length: Power car: 22.15 m (72 ft 8 in); End car: 21.845 m (71 ft 8.0 in); Intermediate car: 18.7 m (61 ft 4 in)
- Width: 2.904 m (9 ft 6.3 in)
- Height: 4.32 m (14 ft 2 in)
- Doors: One per side per passenger car
- Maximum speed: 320 km/h (200 mph)
- Weight: 399 t (393 long tons; 440 short tons)
- Traction system: Alstom ONIX IGBT-VVVF
- Traction motors: 8× Alstom 6 FHA 3657 1,160 kW (1,556 hp) asynchronous motors
- Power output: 9,280 kW (12,445 hp)(25 kV 50 Hz AC); 6,800 kW (9,119 hp)(15 kV 16.7 Hz AC); 3,680 kW (4,935 hp) (1,500 V DC)
- Electric systems: Overhead line: 25 kV 50 Hz AC; 15 kV 16.7 Hz AC; 1,500 V DC; 3,000 V DC
- Current collection: Pantograph
- UIC classification: Bo′Bo′+2′(2)′(2)′(2)′(2)′(2)′(2)′(2)′2′+Bo′Bo′
- Braking systems: Regenerative and pneumatic
- Safety systems: ERTMS level 2, KVB, TVM 430, ASFA, LZB, PZB, ZUB, Integra
- Coupling system: Scharfenberg
- Multiple working: Up to two trains
- Track gauge: 1,435 mm (4 ft 8 1/2 in) standard gauge

Avelia Euroduplex, more commonly known simply as Euroduplex or TGV 2N2 in France, is a high-speed double-decker train manufactured by Alstom. It is primarily operated by the French national railway company SNCF, and also in operation with the Moroccan national railway company ONCF. It is the 3rd generation of the TGV Duplex.

The Euroduplex trains are interoperable, containing equipment allowing them to travel between several European continental countries with various types of electrification and signalling systems. A Moroccan variation is the first high-speed train to operate in Africa.

== Description ==
The Euroduplex trains are an evolution of the TGV Duplex Dasye and still share the main features. The drive is of type SNCF TGV POS asynchronous traction motors, European signaling system European Rail Traffic Management System. The trailers feature improved information systems and the 3UFC type feature new interiors with rotating seats and USB sockets.

The main differences with the TGV Duplex Dasye:

- UIC loading gauge with more headroom upstairs
- Improved windows
- Passenger Information System (SIVE) with voice announcements as in the TER trains.
- Outside SIVE dynamic light display indicating the number of the train, its route and the number of the car
- Fixed filler gaps on all doors,
- Control over the train hot boxes (two sensors per box for redundancy)
- Overall control of each axle
- Improved accessibility for wheelchairs

The 3UFC type have new interiors that include:

- New seat design in both classes
- Rotating seats in first class
- USB sockets
- Individual lights are now included in the seats

== History ==
Riding on the success of the concept TGV Duplex, the company decided to develop a fleet of interoperable trains, especially suitable for 15 kV 16 2/3 Hz. The train is a tricurrent version of TGV Duplex.

The Euroduplex entered commercial operation by SNCF on 11 December 2011.

In parallel with the development of high-speed lines internationally, Alstom SA won a tender for the supply of equipment for a high-speed TGV for Morocco, the first high-speed train on the African continent.

== Operators ==
=== SNCF ===
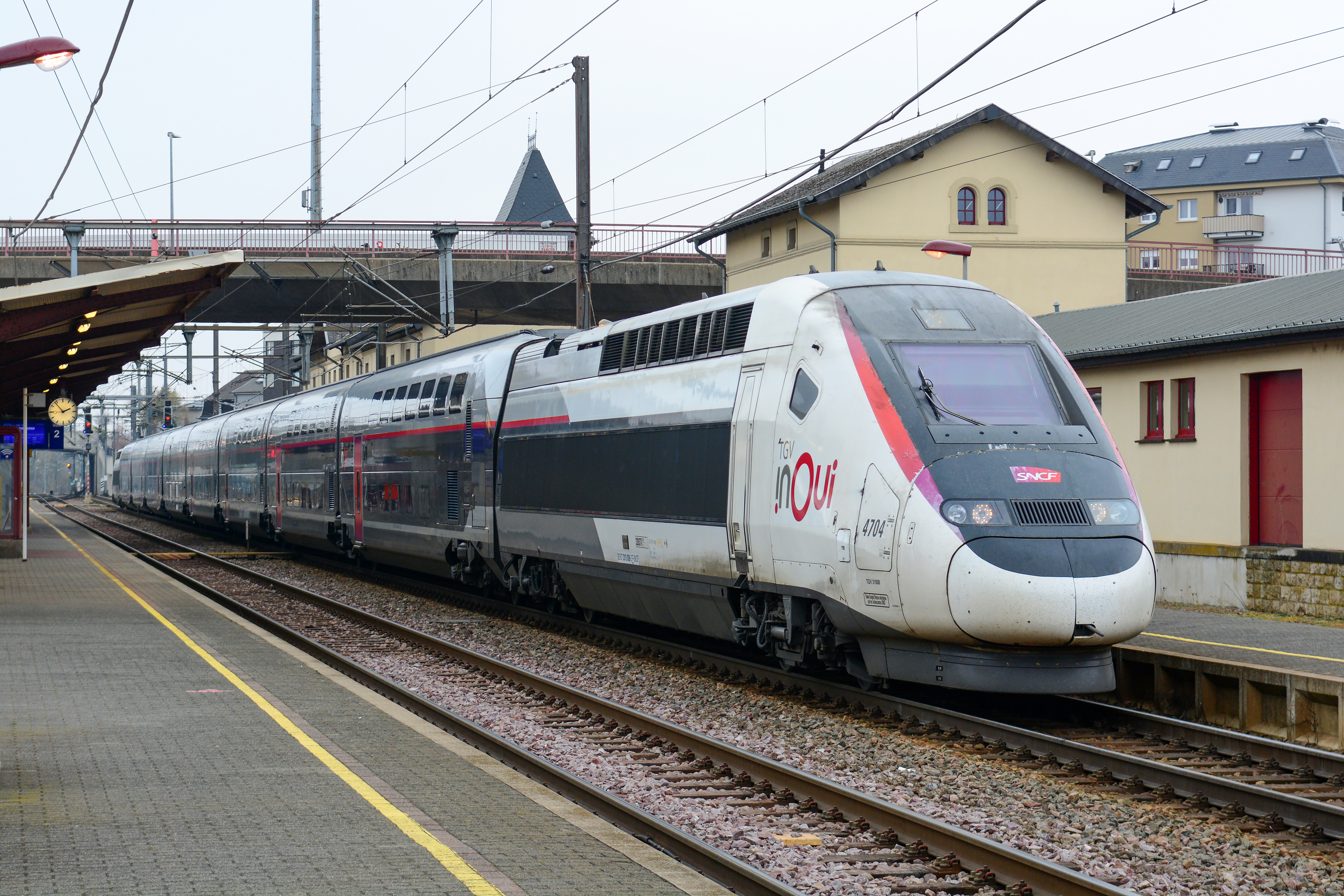
TGV Euroduplex (2N2) number 4704 train in Gare de Bettembourg.

In June 2007, in addition to 25 extra TGV Dasye sets (+ 3 others 2008), the SNCF has placed a large order for 55 Alstom tricurrent high-speed trains, TGV 2N2.

These 55 trains can be divided into:

- 30 trains "3UA" (tricurrent Germany), numbered 4701-4730 (4 international) for services from France to Germany and Switzerland. Prototypes were tested from August 2010, the remaining deliveries expected between 2011 and 2014;
- 10 trains "3UH" (bicurrent Spain), numbered 801 to 810, for services between France and Spain (deliveries from 2013);
- 15 trains "3UF" (bicurrent France), numbered 811-825, intended for domestic traffic in France (deliveries from 2014);
- A Power Reserve "3UA" compatible with the 55 cars and also for the TGV POS and TGV Duplex Dasye.

In April 2010, the first train RGV, numbered 4701, was tested at La Rochelle. On 16 June 2010, the train arrived at the site of ELWT Conflans to be equipped with different systems to perform many tests in the coming months before commercial operation. Between 20 and 30 July 2010, the train conducted speed tests in Switzerland, Germany, the Netherlands, Belgium and the French Alps.

SNCF and Alstom organized the symbolic delivery of the first train on 30 May 2011 on the LGV Est.

The 2007 contract included an option for 40 additional trains. SNCF exercised this option to take delivery of the second batch of Euroduplex sets from 2015. These are the 3UFC type (the "C" stands for capacity) and named "Océane". They were delivered between 2016 and 2019 and have replaced some sets on TGV Atlantique with the opening of the LGV Sud Europe Atlantique. They offer a new interior design and a capacity expanded by 10% mainly due to the third car being multi-class, and were delivered between 2016 and 2019 and are numbered from 851 to 891 (minus 866, which only consists of power reserve motors).

To save the workforce of the Alstom factory in Belfort, the French government announced in October 2016 the purchase of fifteen trains to be used on the intercity line between Bordeaux, Toulouse and Marseille. SNCF carried out the order in February 2017. These trains, of the 3UFC type, are numbered from 836 to 850 and have been delivered since August 2019.

In July 2019, SNCF announced an order of twelve trains that would be delivered between 2021 and 2023 (shortly before the arrival of the first Avelia Horizon) with the last trainset being delivered in April 2023. The complete fleet would consist of 122 trains.

=== Services ===
Since its introduction into commercial service, the 4700 numbered trains operate priority international services:

- Alleo Paris-Est — Stuttgart — Munich (via LGV East Europe)
- Alleo Frankfurt — Strasbourg — Lyon-Part-Dieu — Marseille (via the LGV Rhin-Rhône and Mediterranean)
- Lyria Paris-Gare de Lyon — Basel — Zürich (via the Rhine-Rhône) since January 2012 (three of the six round trips, the others were being operated by TGV POS until 15 December 2019 where Lyria started operating exclusively with the Euroduplex)

The trains are used on domestic routes (via the LGV Est to Strasbourg, Reims, Remiremont, but also via the Rhin-Rhône to Colmar and Mulhouse among others).

The 800 numbered trains are designed to provide international services to Spain:

- Elipsos: Paris-Gare de Lyon — Lyon Part Dieu — Montpellier — Figueres — Barcelona (in a pool with TGV Duplex Dasye)

The 3UFC are all operating from Paris Montparnasse firstly towards Bordeaux — Agen — Montauban — Toulouse — Arcachon — Dax — Bayonne — Biarritz — Saint-Jean-de-Luz — Saint-Jean-de-Luz — Pau — Lourdes — Tarbes. Then towards Le Mans — Rennes — Quimper — Brest — Angers — Nantes — Saint-Nazaire — Le Croisic — Les Sables-d'Olonne. Since 2021 some trains started operations from Paris Lyon towards Lyon, Saint-Étienne, Marseille and Nice.

=== ONCF ===
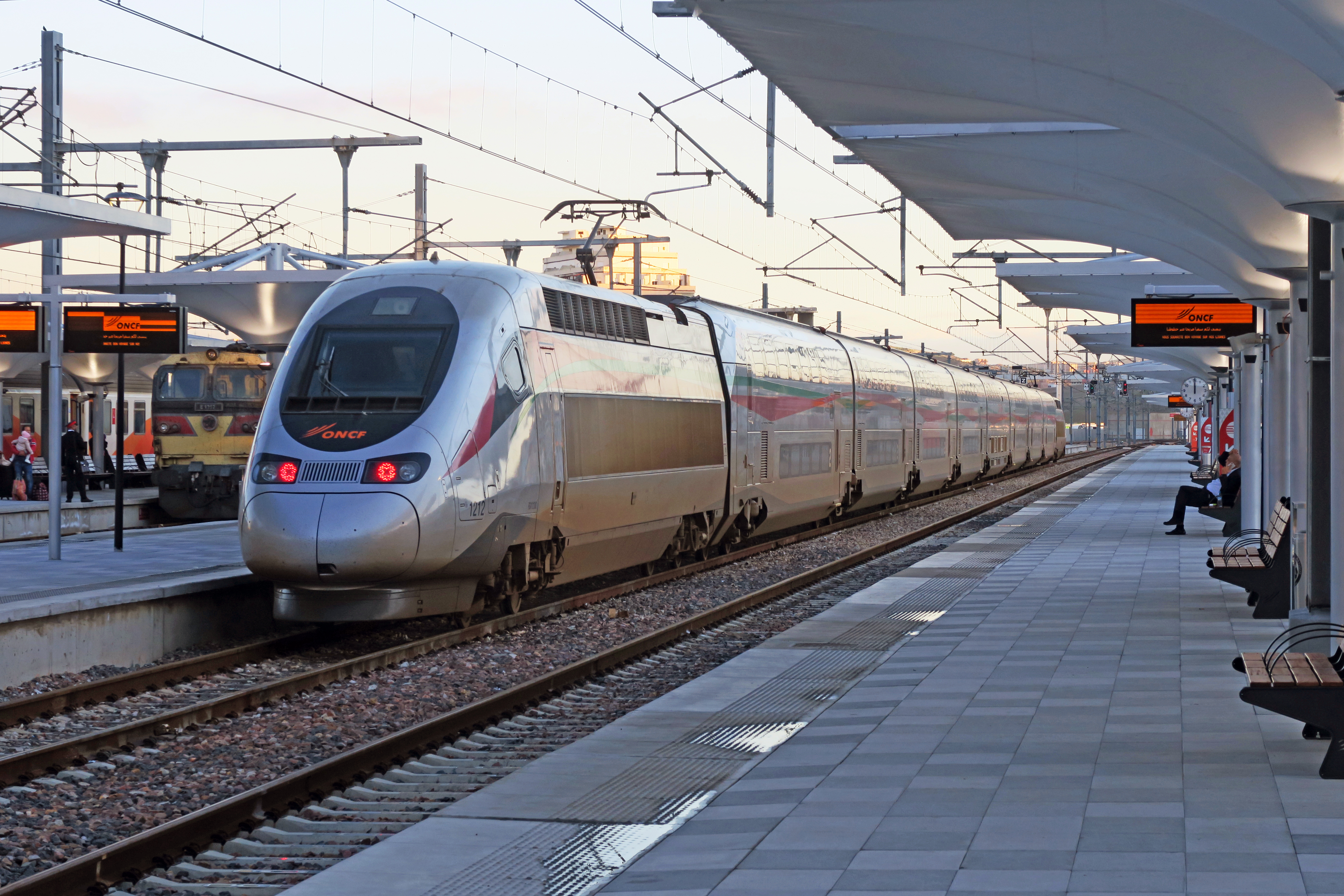
RAn ONCF Alstom RGV2N2 high-speed trainset at Tanger Ville railway station in November 2018.

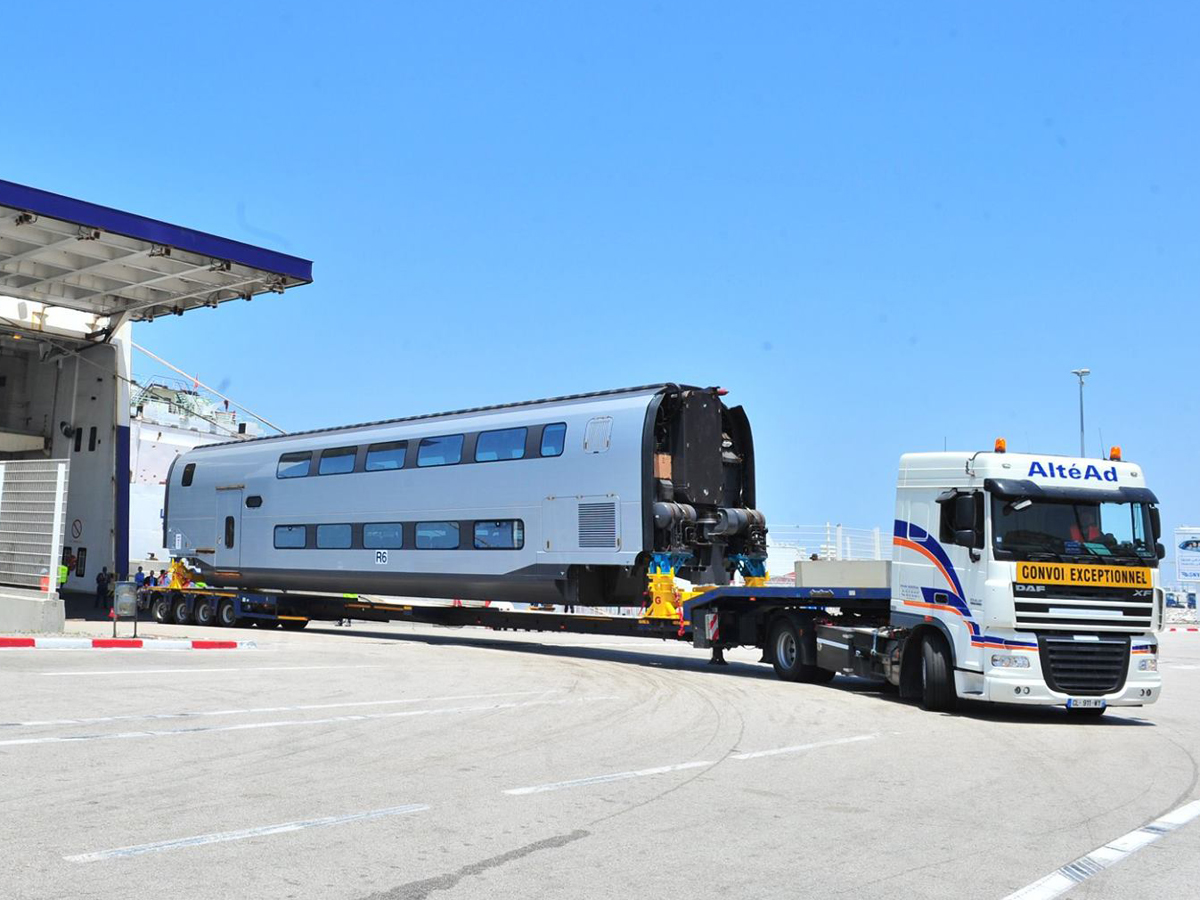
ONCF Moroccan TGV coach delivery.

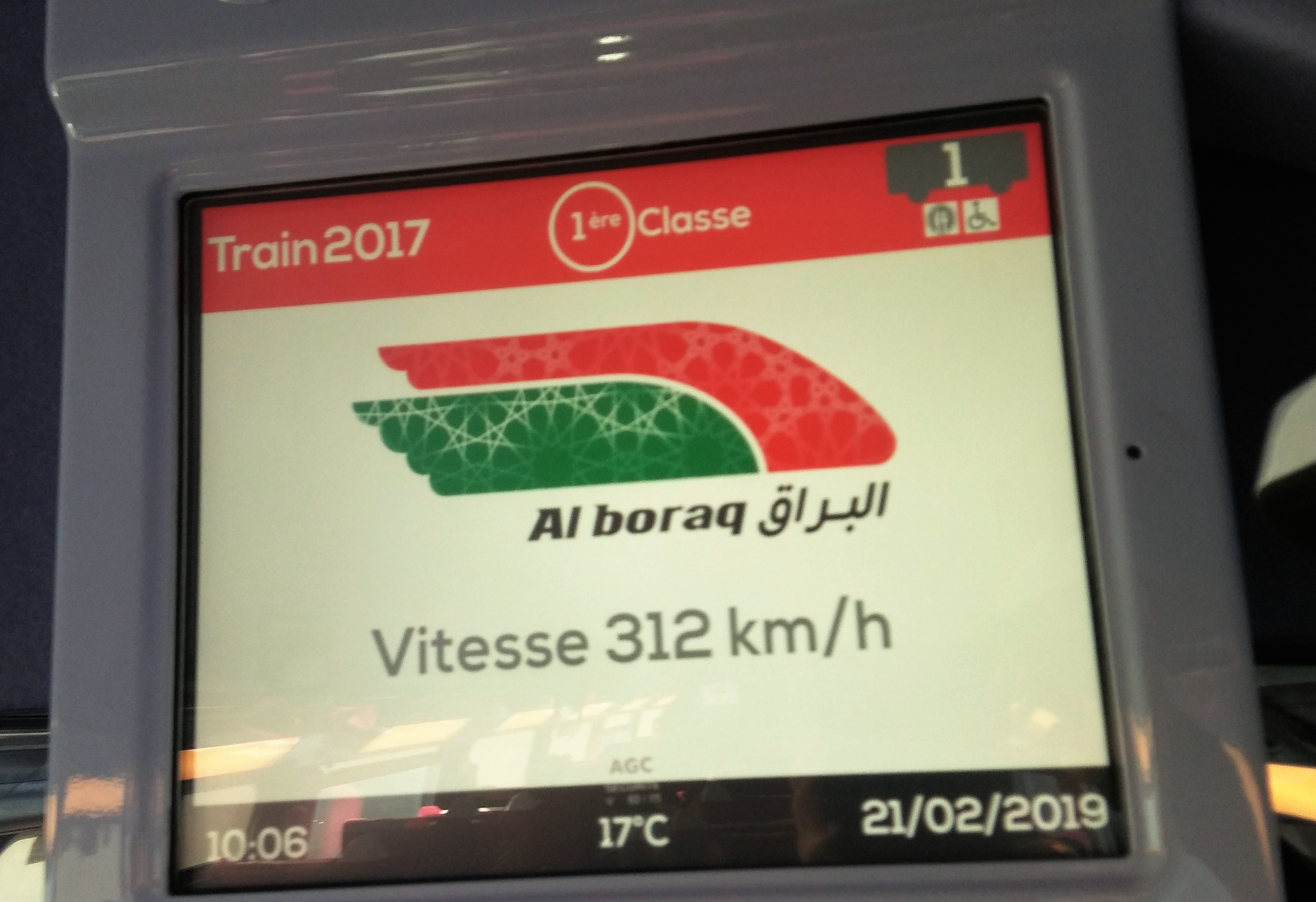
The Moroccan fast train Al Boraq (The Lightning) traveling near its top speed.

In December 2010, the Moroccan company ONCF ordered 14 sets of the Euroduplex for Kenitra–Tangier high-speed rail line. The contract of €400 million expected commissioning in 2015. The ordered trains are electrified at 25 kV and 3 kV and can operate up to 320 km/h (200 mph) on the section Tangiers — Kenitra and between 160–220 km/h (99–137 mph) on the Moroccan conventional network.

The Moroccan trainsets have a total capacity of 533 passengers in two first-class carriages, five second class carriages, and a catering coach, instead of the French configuration of three first class coaches, four second-class coaches, and a catering coach. The modifications were made according to the Moroccan climatic and environmental conditions. The first two cars will be delivered during the summer of 2015, transported from the port of La Rochelle by the ship Ville de Bordeaux. The project being more than two years late on its initial schedule (due to land acquisition difficulties), Alstom Transport incurs additional costs, in particular through the forced storage of several trains in its factories. The first dynamic tests of a train (No. 1201, specially assigned to tests) began in January 2016, on the classic line connecting Tangier to Casablanca, with drivers who were specially trained (partly in France, by the SNCF ); these tests were completed in July 2016. At the same time (on 11 July), the twelve trains were delivered. LGV testing began in February 2017 and was completed in June 2018; during one of them, carried out on 4 May 2018, the train achieved a speed of 357 km/h (220 mph) (which constitutes the record of rail speed in Africa). During this period, Alstom delivered 12 trains for the Tangier-Casablanca railway section. King Mohammed VI and French President Emmanuel Macron participated in the inauguration. Upon launch, it became the first high-speed railway line in Africa.

The maintenance center, with a total capacity of 30 trains and an area of 14 hectares, is located in Tangier-Moghogha.

=== Services ===
Since 26 November 2018, the Moroccan trains make the connections between Tanger and Casablanca via Rabat. The name of the commercial service is Al Boraq.

It is operated in partnership with SNCF, within the framework of the joint venture "Moroccan high-speed train maintenance company".

== See also ==
- Avelia Horizon
- Avelia Liberty
