= Sidi El Aidi =

Coordinates: 33.1228°N 7.6219°W

Sidi El Aidi سيدي العايدي
- Rural commune and town
- Interactive map of Sidi El Aidi
- Country: Morocco
- Region: Chaouia-Ouardigha
- Province: Settat Province

Population (2004)
  - Total: 13,273
- Time zone: UTC+0 (GMT)

Sidi El Aidi is a small town and rural commune in Settat Province of the Chaouia-Ouardigha region of Morocco. At the time of the 2004 census, the commune had a total population of 13273 people living in 2226 households.
