= Al Boraq =

High speed railway in Morocco

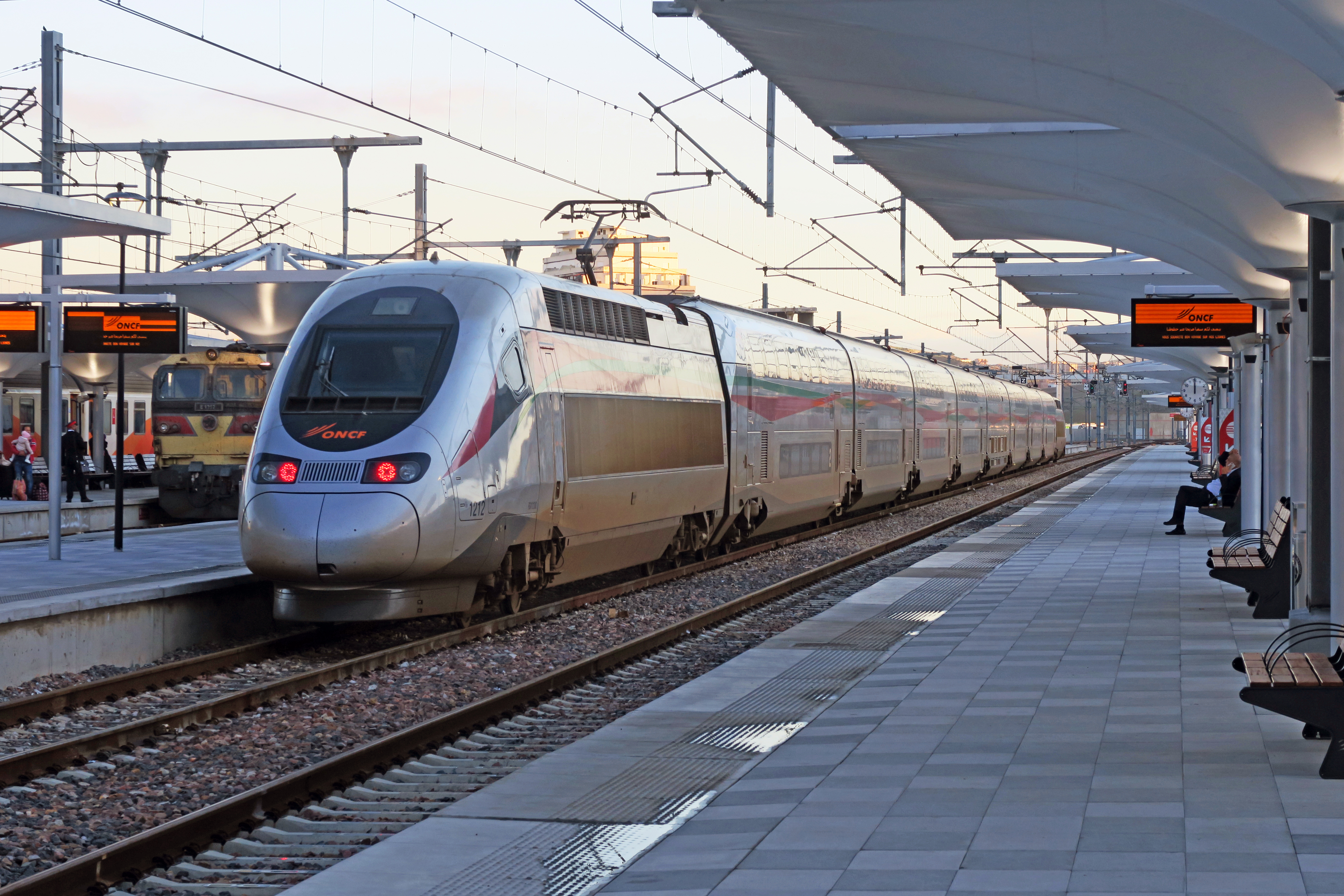
- An ONCF Al Boraq Alstom RGV2N2 high-speed trainset at the Tanger-Ville Railway Terminal, November 2018

Overview
- Native name: البُراق
- Owner: Morocco
- Locale: Morocco
- Termini: Tanger-Ville Railway Terminal (Tangier); Casa-Voyageurs Railway Station (Casablanca)

Service
- Type: High-speed rail
- Operator: ONCF
- Rolling stock: Euroduplex
- Ridership: > 5,5 million (2024)

History
- Opened: 15 November 2018; 7 years ago

Technical
- Line length: 350 km (220 mi)
- Track gauge: 1,435 mm (4 ft 8 1/2 in) standard gauge
- Electrification: Overhead line: 25 kV 50 Hz AC; 3,000 V DC
- Operating speed: 320 km/h (200 mph)
Route map
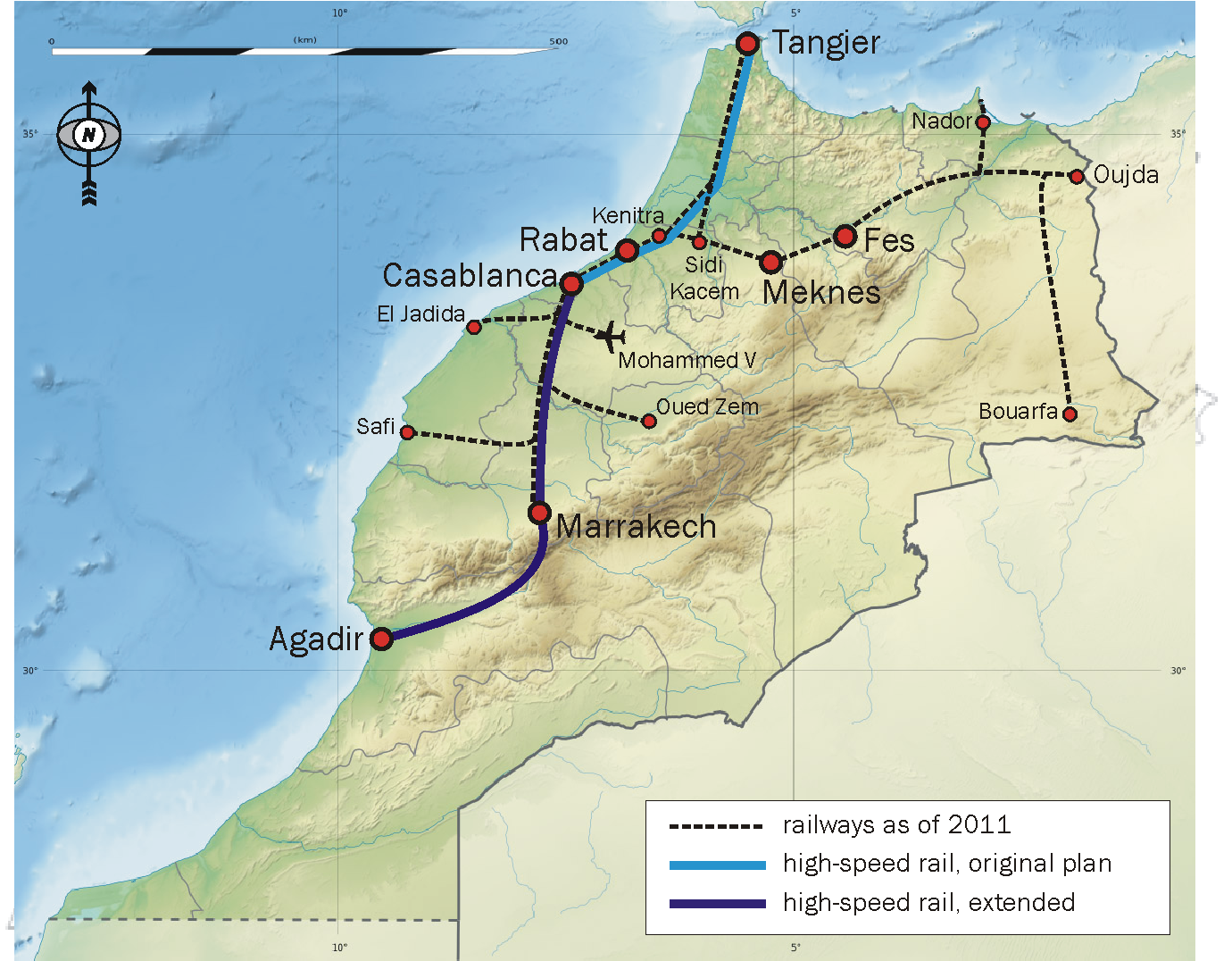

Al Boraq (Arabic: البُراق, romanized: al-burāq) is a 323-kilometre (201 mi) high-speed rail service between Casablanca and Tangier in Morocco. The first of its kind on the African continent, it opened on 15 November 2018 after a decade of planning and construction by ONCF, Morocco's national railway company.

On the 186 km (116 mi) section from Tangier to Kenitra, trains run on a dedicated high-speed line and travel up to 320 km/h (199 mph). For the final 137 km (85 mi), trains run on an upgraded mainline from Kenitra through Rabat and Morocco’s most populous corridor to Casablanca.

It is the first phase of the country's planned 1,500-kilometre (900 mi) high-speed rail network.

== Name ==
King Mohammed VI of Morocco named the service Al Boraq (البُراق) after the creature in Islamic tradition believed to have transported some prophets, including the Islamic prophet Muhammad from Mecca to Jerusalem during the night journey.

== History ==
Early studies into the feasibility of high-speed rail in Morocco began in 2003, and by 2006 the route between Tangier and Kenitra had been identified as being among the first lines to be constructed. In 2007, preliminary agreements to manage the project were signed, and ONCF announced plans to purchase 18 Alstom trainsets. In 2008, ONCF said that it planned to begin construction that year, with operations to begin in 2013.

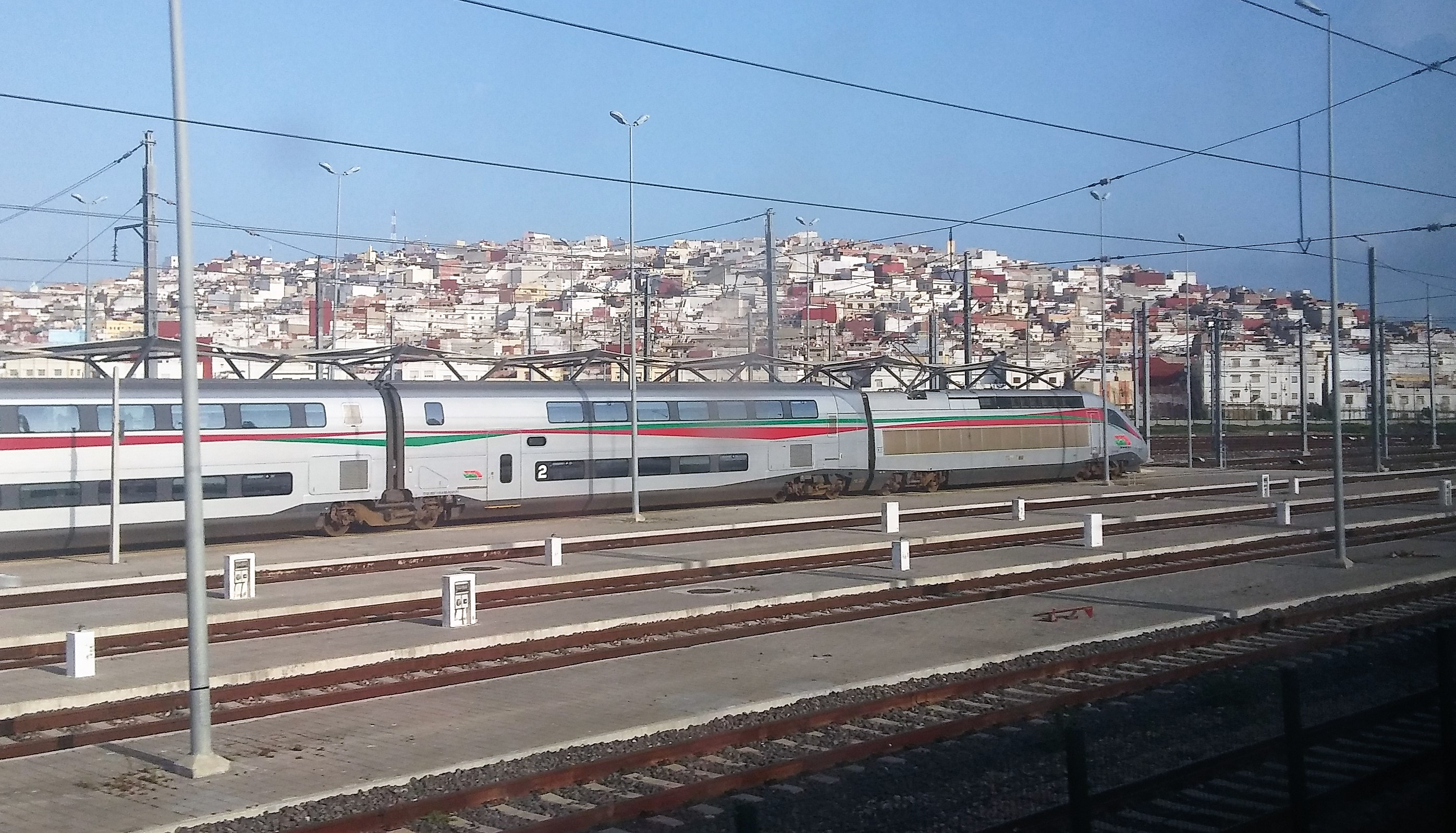
Al Boraq RGV2N2 in Tangier.

Financing was not finalised until February 2010, when ONCF signed agreements worth 20 billion dirhams (DH). Direct investments came from the Moroccan government, which allocated DH4.8 billion to the project, and European sources, which invested a total of DH1.9 billion, while the remaining DH12.3 billion came from commercial loans. DH10 billion were to be spent on infrastructure, with DH5.6 billion going to supporting equipment and DH4.4 billion to rolling stock. At the time, work was expected to start in mid-2010, with service beginning in December 2015. In December 2010, ONCF signed a final agreement to purchase 14 Alstom Euroduplex trainsets. Following further delays, construction of the line began on 29 September 2011, when a groundbreaking ceremony took place in Tangier.

On 25 September 2012, work began on a project to increase capacity on the trackage between Kenitra and Casablanca by constructing a dedicated freight track in the existing right of way, allowing for passenger trains to access Casablanca from the high-speed line to Tangier. In addition to the rail construction, stations in four locations (Tangiers, Kenitra, Rabat/Agdal, and Casablanca) were either constructed from the ground up or rebuilt from existing facilities. On 19 June 2015, rolling stock deliveries began with the arrival of the first trainset in Tangier. In September, the service facility for the trains in Tangier was completed and a joint venture between ONCF and French rail operator SNCF was established to maintain the trains for a 15-year contract. In February 2017, testing of the trains at revenue speeds began; during the test program, an African rail speed record of 357 kilometres per hour (222 mph) was set.

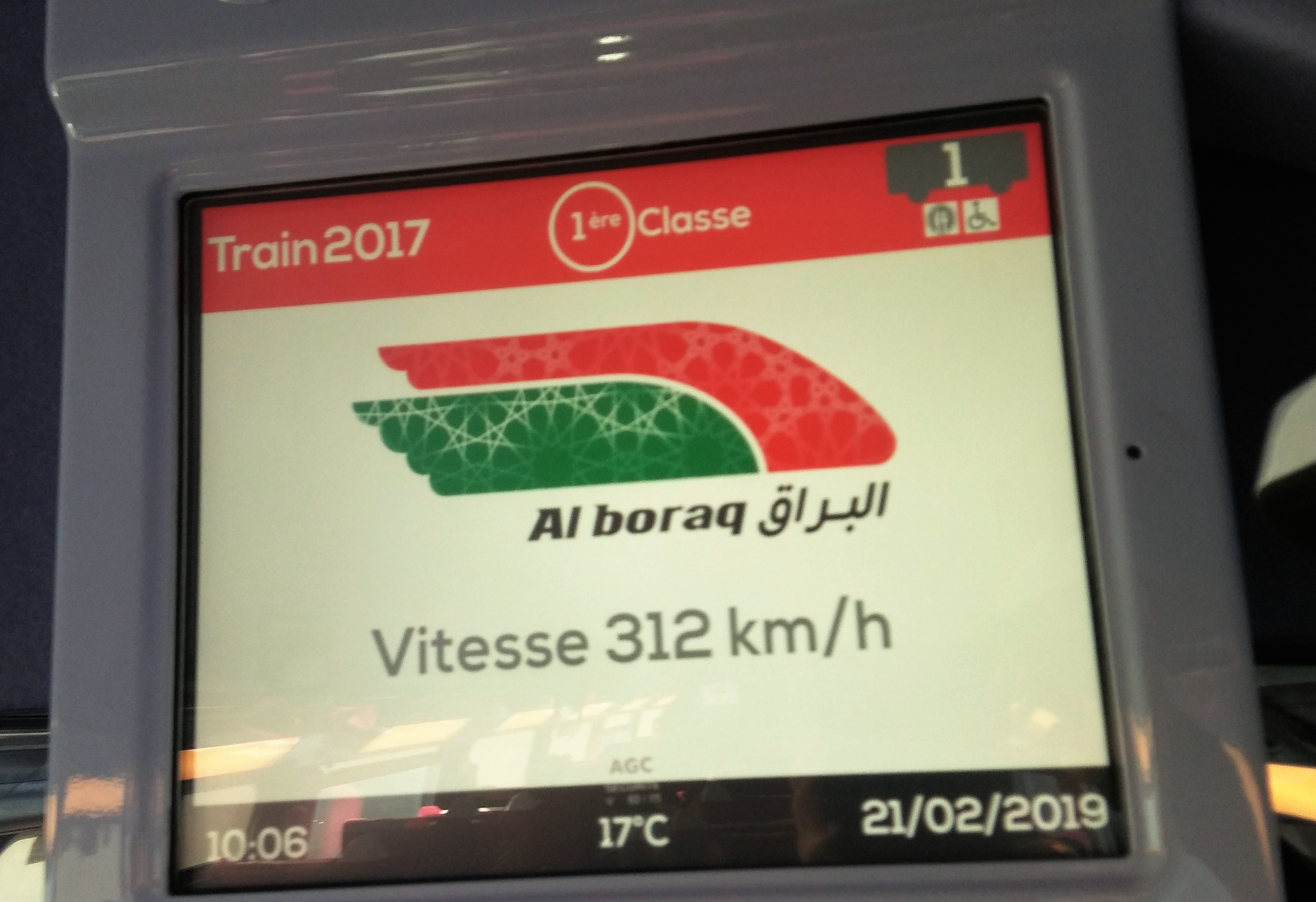
An on-board train speed reading 312 km/h.

In October 2017, track construction was completed, followed by installation of the new electric catenary that November. The electrical system was energised for the first time in January 2018, and the line's control facility came online the following month. By mid-2018, the stations had been completed, though the expected entry into service was pushed back to the end of the year, as trial runs over the route had yet to be operated.

On 15 November 2018, the Al Boraq service was inaugurated at a Tangier ceremony on a special train that traveled to Rabat; revenue service was to begin by the end of the year. By 25 December 2018, trains were scheduled to depart Casablanca every two hours from 06:00 until 21:00.

The inauguration of the high-speed rail service also came with the opening of several new or renovated train stations: Tanger-Ville Railway Terminal, Kenitra Station, Rabat-Agdal Station, and Casa-Voyageurs Railway Station.

In January 2022, Mohamed Abdeljalil, Morocco's Minister of Transport and Logistics, announced that the Al-Boraq network would eventually terminate in Agadir and announced the construction of a high-speed line which would connect Agadir with Marrakesh. In November 2022, Abdeljalil announced the construction of dedicated high-speed tracks that would connect Marrakesh to the original line via Kenitra. The construction is to take place in three segments, with the 150-kilometre-long (93 mi) segment connecting Kenitra with Aïn Sebaâ to be constructed first. Then a 130-kilometre-long (81 mi) extension will be built from Aïn Sebaâ to Nouaceur, and then finally the construction of new tracks from Nouaceur to Marrakesh, with the cities 212 km (132 mi) apart. Tests were run on the current tracks from Casablanca to Marrakesh in January 2023, reaching 80 kilometres per hour (50 mph). The plan is to continue to test the current tracks between Casablanca and Marrakesh, with ONCF hoping that a top speed of 160 kilometres per hour (99 mph) can be reached safely.

== Infrastructure ==
The line is made up of two sections—a new route from Tangier to Kenitra and an upgrade of the existing route from Kenitra to Casablanca. The 186-kilometre-long (116 mi) Tangier–Kenitra line has a top speed of 320 km/h (199 mph), while the 137-kilometre-long (85 mi) Kenitra–Casablanca line was rated for 160 km/h (99 mph) when service began, with a planned upgrade to 220 km/h (137 mph). The trackage from Kenitra to Casablanca is to be eventually replaced by a new high-speed right of way, with construction scheduled to begin in 2020. Two electrification types are used—from Tangier to Kenitra, the new trackage was built with 25 kV 50 Hz AC electrification while the line from Kenitra to Casablanca retained the existing 3,000 V DC catenary. The ETCS-type signal system was installed by Ansaldo STS and Cofely Ineo.

At service launch in 2018, travel time between Casablanca and Tangier dropped from 4 hours and 45 minutes to 2 hours and 10 minutes. Completion of dedicated high-speed trackage to Casablanca would further reduce travel time to 1 hour and 30 minutes.

== Rolling stock ==
The twelve (14 were originally ordered) Alstom Euroduplex trainsets operating on the line are bilevel and have a passenger capacity of 533. Each trainset is composed of two power cars and eight passenger cars (two first-class cars, five second-class cars, and a buffet car).

18 Avelia Horizon trains were ordered from Alstom in March 2025, at a value of €781 million.

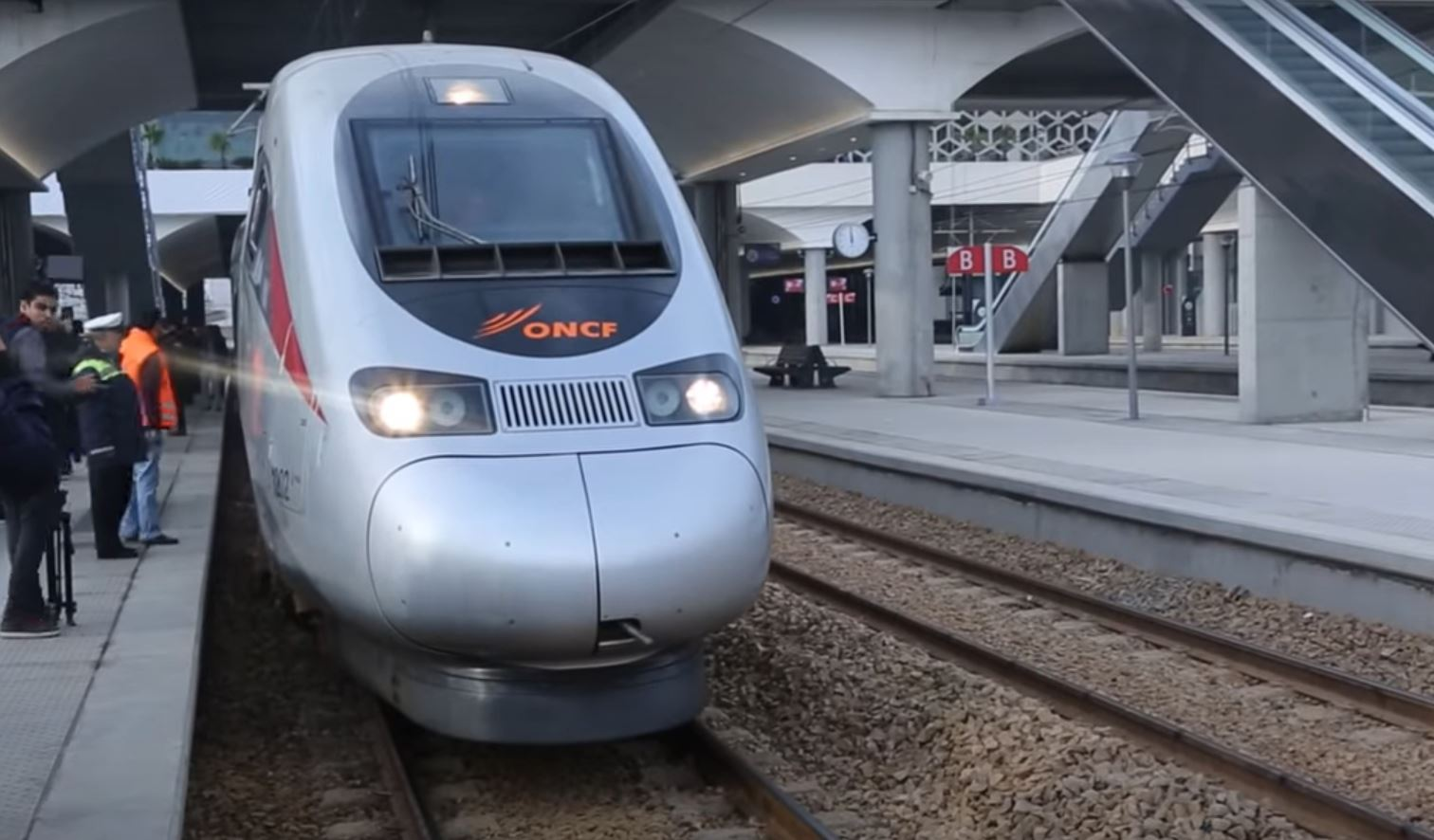
ONCF RGV2N2.

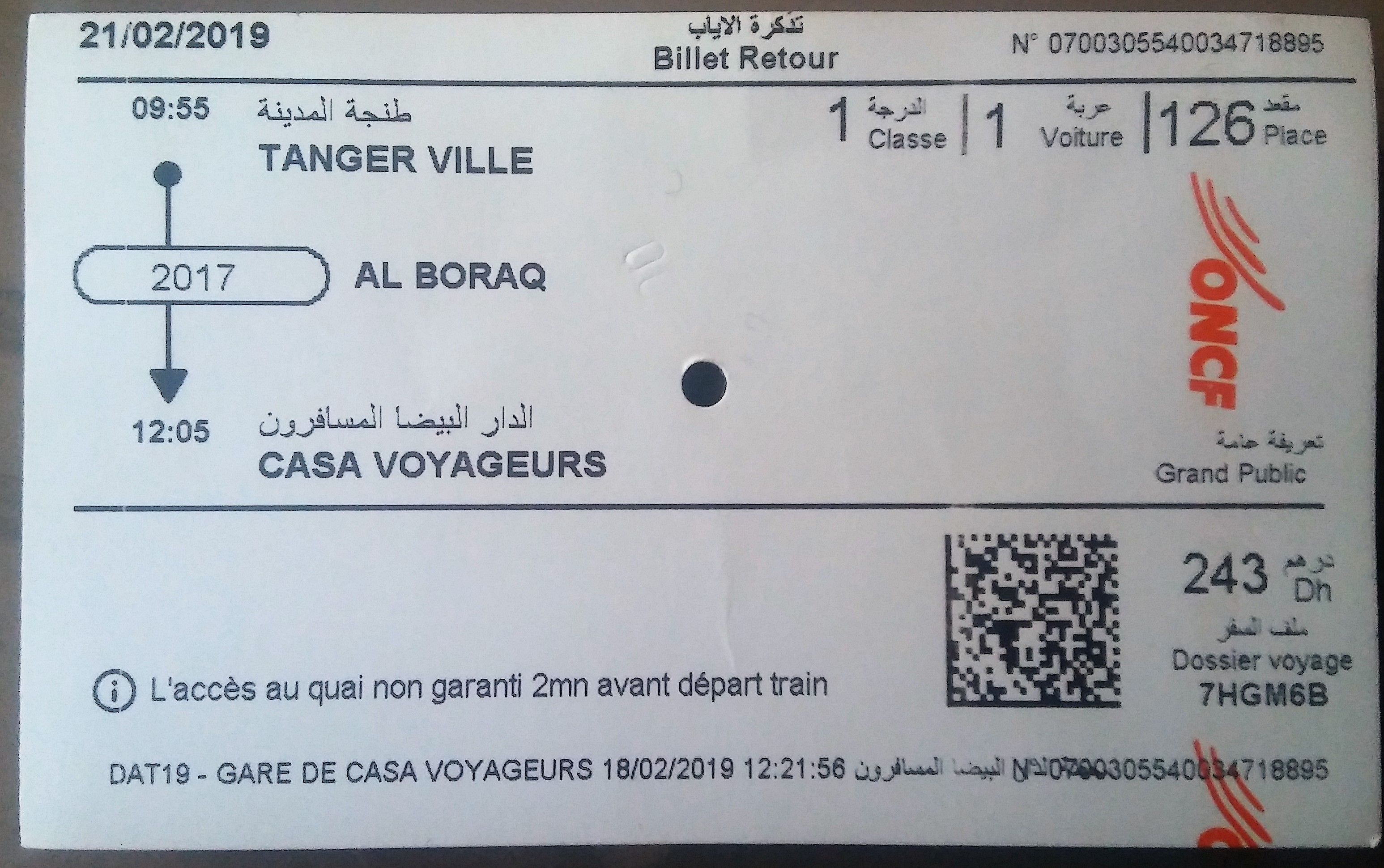
Train ticket from Tangier to Casablanca

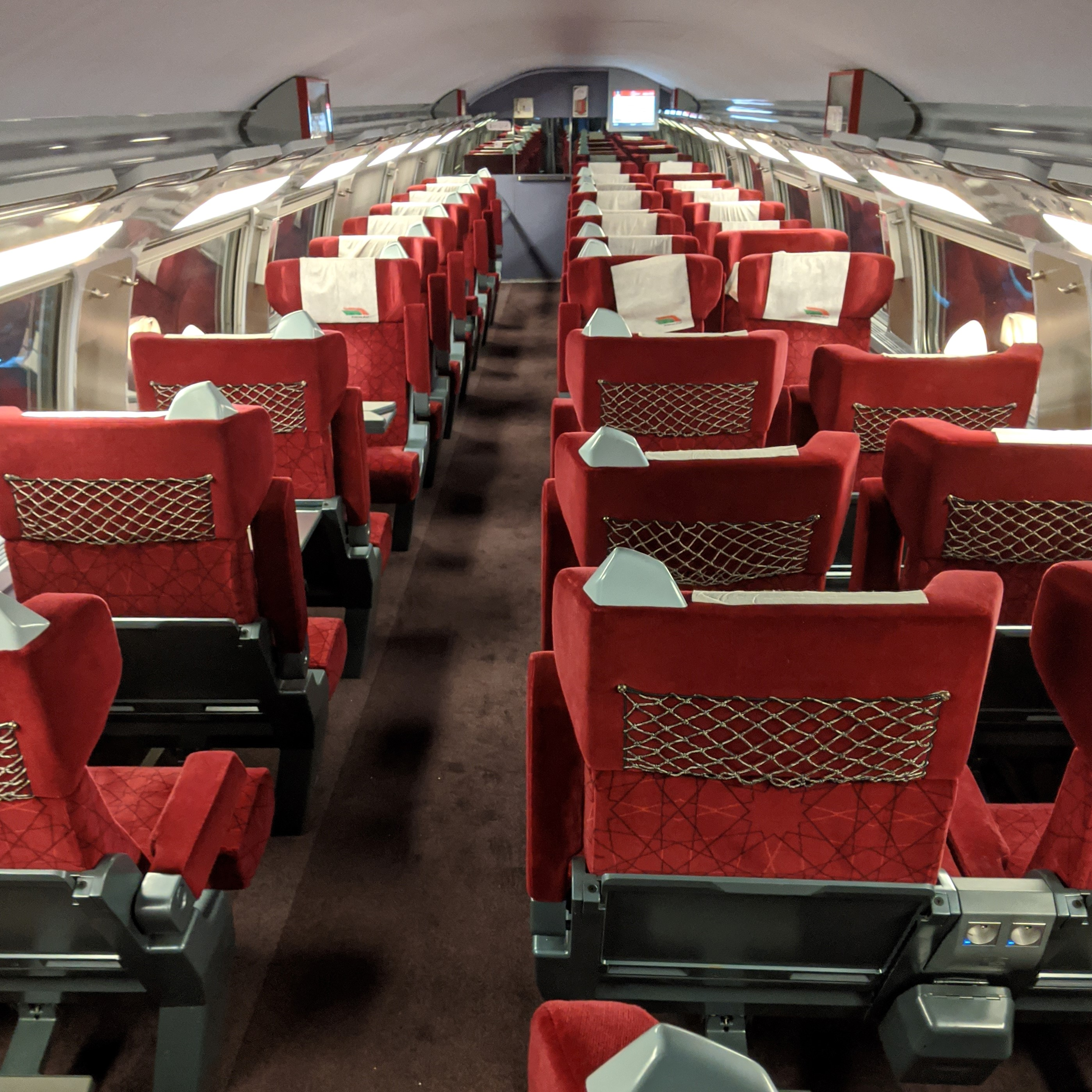
View of first-class seats

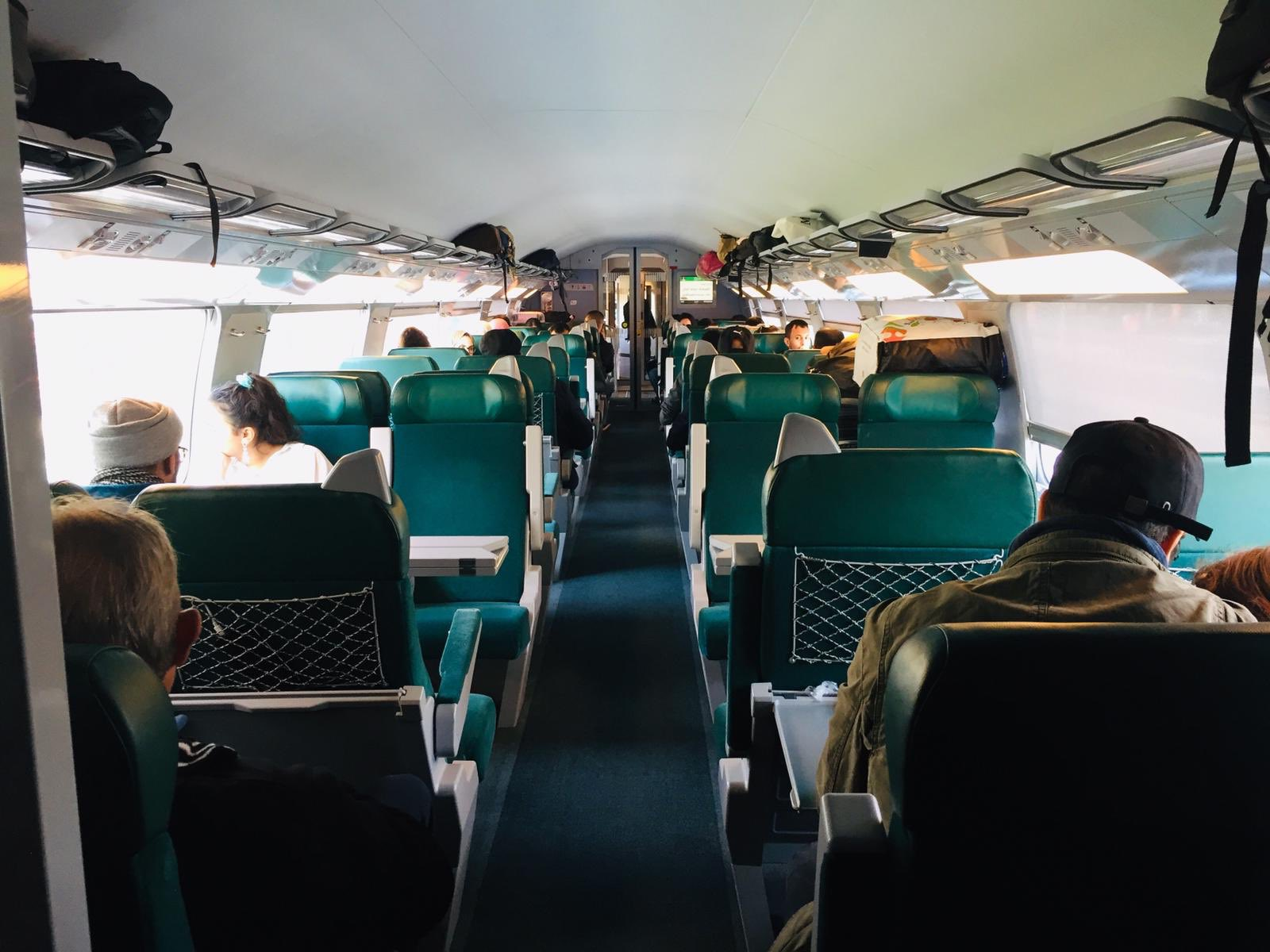
View of second-class seats

== Performance ==
Number of passengers transported by high-speed services on the line:

| | 2018 | 2019 | 2020 | 2021 | 2022 | 2023 | 2024 |
|---|---|---|---|---|---|---|---|
| Passenger numbers (millions) | | 3 | 1,3 | 2,4 | 4,2 | 5 | 5,5 |

== See also ==
- Transport in Morocco
- Alstom E 1400
- Corail
