= Alleo =

Historical railway company (2007–2018)

Overview
- Service type: high-speed rail
- First service: 2007; 19 years ago
- Last service: 2018; 8 years ago
- Current operators: DB Fernverkehr; SNCF Mobilités
- Website: www.alleo.eu

Alleo was a railway company between 2007 and 2018 that managed high-speed rail passenger services between France and Germany. The company was a joint subsidiary of SNCF Mobilités and Deutsche Bahn (DB) with headquarters in Saarbrücken and later Strasbourg.

== History ==
Rhealys is a consortium of Deutsche Bahn (DB), French (SNCF), Luxembourg (CFL) and Swiss (SBB) railways preparing high-speed railways between Paris, Luxembourg, Switzerland and south west of Germany. The registered office is at Luxembourg. Although Rhealys prepared the connections, the international train connections between France and Germany were operated since mid-2007 by the newly founded German-French company Alleo.

On 23 May 2005, the then CEOs of DB and SNCF, Hartmut Mehdorn and Louis Gallois, signed a letter of intent to offer common high speed services between southern Germany and Paris from 2007 onwards.

The joint venture agreement was signed by Mehdorn and Anne-Marie Idrac, the former CEO of SNCF, on 25 May 2007 in Paris. Tasks are taken over by the project company Rhealys. Prior to 2016, the enterprise was based at Saarbrücken. In total, only seven employees are employed. The joint venture was initially contractually secured until 2012. However, unlike similar business models such as Lyria between SNCF and SBB, Alleo is not externally communicated and has not been introduced as a trademark.

Since the summer of 2008, ICE units have repeatedly failed on the north-east, so that substitute TGVs were used, the connection was frequently broken in Saarbrücken or trains failed completely. In addition to the disturbances and failures, rail traffic on this axis is considered to be less competitive than other modes of transport because of travel time.

In March 2008, Hoffmann announced the positive development of the first financial year, in the future, new stops (such as the station Gare de Champagne-Ardenne TGV) and destinations (such as the Marne la Vallée-Chessy station, which connects the Disneyland Resort Paris to the French high-speed network) to want. However, with the timetable change in December 2009, the stops of trains to and from Frankfurt at the Lorraine TGV station were cancelled.

Since 23 March 2012, the cooperation of the two railways on the new route from Frankfurt am Main via Strasbourg and Lyon to Marseille on the opened in December 2011 LGV Rhin-Rhône continued. In 2013, a market share of 58% was achieved on the Stuttgart-Paris route. On the Frankfurt-Paris route, the market share of rail is 26% compared to the aircraft. Between 2008 and 2014, the number of passengers using the service had reportedly increased by 44 percent.

On 23 September 2014, DB CEO Rüdiger Grube and SNCF CEO Guillaume Pepy both signed an agreement to expend their cooperation in German-French high-speed traffic until 2020.

The trains of the 407 series, launched in mid-2015 in German-French high-speed traffic, have replaced the series 406 trains eligible for franking, which were dismantled and thus lost their license for traffic to France. From April 2016, the ICE offer should have been expanded from five to six trains per day. Of these, four were to travelled via Saarbrücken and two via Strasbourg.

Between 2007 and 2016, the range of flights between Stuttgart and Paris dropped from over 60 to around 25 flights per week. With the commissioning of the 106 km long and 320 km / h passable new construction section between Baudrecourt and Strasbourg, the travel time should first be reduced from July 3 by ten minutes to three and a half hours, and the offer be extended from four to five train pairs. Later, another shortening is done at 3 hours and 10 minutes. In 2016, the headquarters were moved from Saarbrücken to Strasbourg. Liquidation of the company has been decided at the end of 2018.

The cooperation between DB and SNCF for high-speed services between France and Germany is still continuing outside of Alleo as of 2019.

== Services ==
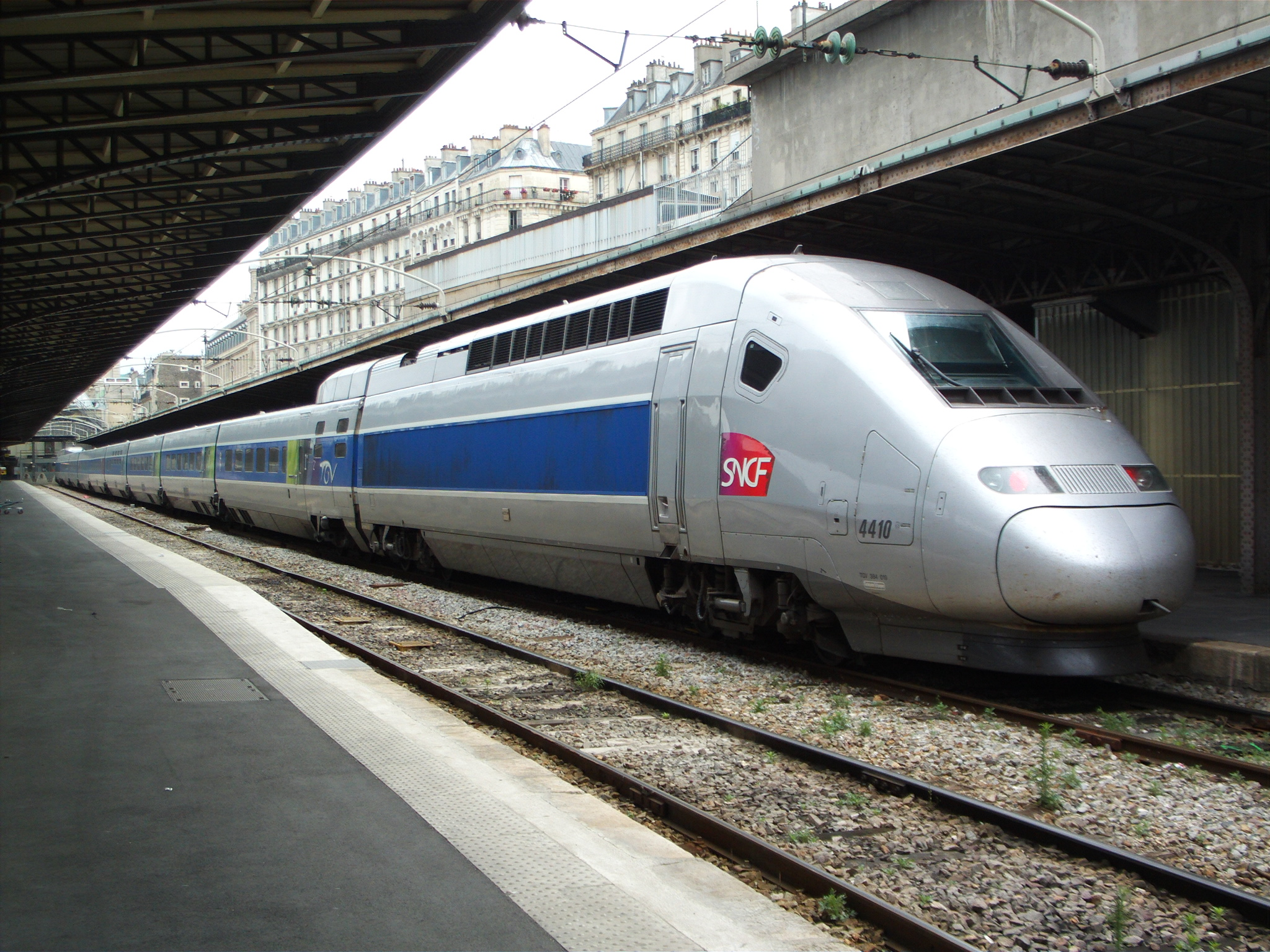
A TGV POS used for Alleo services.

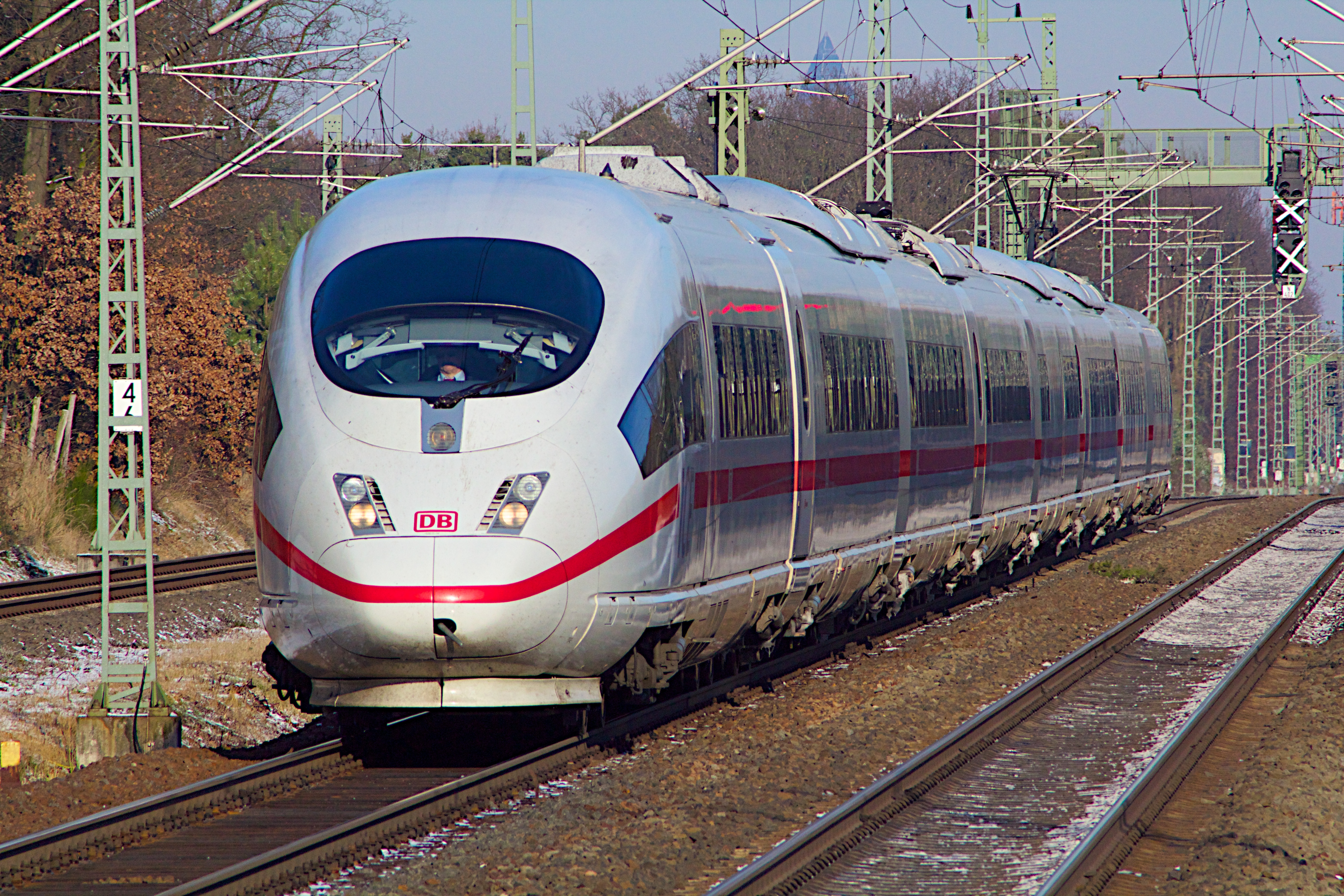
An ICE 3 (Class 406) used for Alleo services.

=== History ===
From 10 June 2007, the Frankfurt-Main-Paris route was served for the time being with one train pair per day; two more operated only between Saarbrücken and Paris. From December 2007, the operation with five train pairs daily was fully recorded throughout the route. Modified ICE 3 trains and the French TGV POS, which has been tested on German routes since November 2005, are used for international traffic. On the German side the trains stop in Mannheim, Kaiserslautern and Saarbrücken. The maximum operating speeds in France are 320 km/h, between Mannheim and Saarbrücken only 160 km/h. One of the reasons is the lack of the safety system (LZB) required for faster driving in Germany on this upgraded route; In view of the ETCS system under development, the Federal Minister of Transport has banned retrofitting the route with LZB. There are also railroad crossings to be removed, especially between Neustadt an der Weinstraße and Kaiserslautern. The track allows in places only a maximum speed of 80 km/h because of the many curves. At the same time, traffic on the Stuttgart - Paris route was recorded with four daily pairs of trains.

From December 2007, a train pair was tied to Munich. Only the TGV POS was used there.

The start of operations on this route with speeds up to 320 km / h took place on 10 June 2007 (see main article: LGV Est).

=== Routes ===
At the time of closure, Alleo managed the following lines:

- Paris–Saarbrücken–Kaiserslautern–Mannheim–Frankfurt/Main (4 pair)
- Paris–Strasbourg–Karlsruhe–Mannheim–Frankfurt/Main (2 pair)
- Paris–Strasbourg–Karlsruhe–Stuttgart (3 pair)
- Paris–Strasbourg–Karlsruhe–Stuttgart–Ulm–Augsburg–Munich (1 pair)
- Frankfurt/Main–Mannheim–Karlsruhe–Baden-Baden–Strasbourg–Mulhouse–Belfort–Besançon–Lyon–Avignon–Aix-en-Provence–Marseille (1 pair)

== See also ==
- Eurostar, another operator of high-speed services between Germany and France
- Elipsos, a joint-venture between SNCF and Renfe
