= Société d'études techniques et économiques =

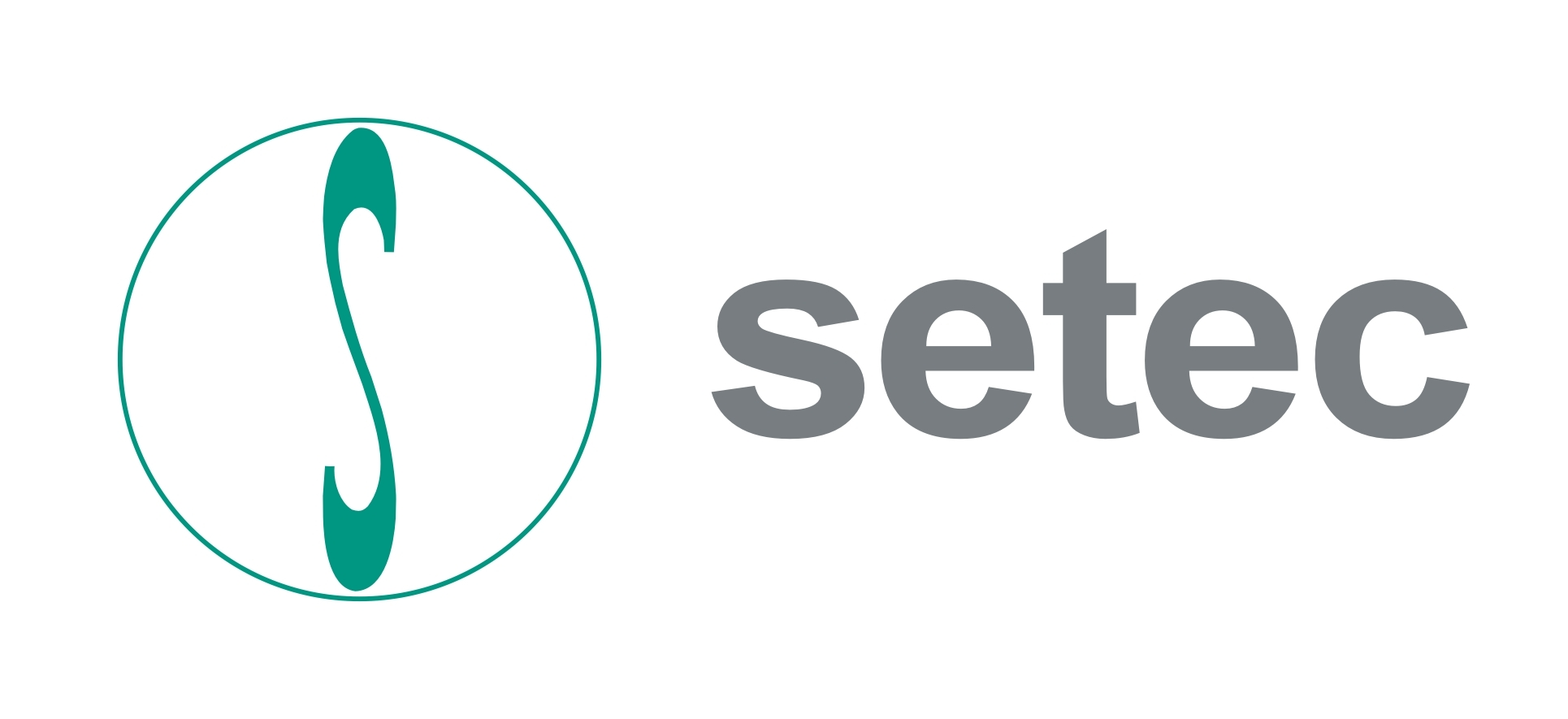
- Company type: Private
- Industry: engineering and consulting services
- Founded: Paris, France (1957)
- Founder: Henri Grimond & Guy Saias
- Headquarters: Paris, France
- Revenue: ▲€235 million (2011)
- Number of employees: ▲2,100 (2011)
- Website: setec.fr

Setec is the fifth largest French engineering and consulting group, involved in infrastructure and transport systems, planning, economics, waste, project, telecommunication, water, energy, geotechnical and environmental management. Setec was created in 1957 as an acronym of the French Société d'Études Techniques et ÉConomiques, which means "technical and economical design company".

Its headquarters are located in Paris, near the Seine. Setec has been involved in various large-scale projects; these include the Channel Tunnel, the Millau Viaduct, the LGV Rhin-Rhône and LGV Est, the Peking opera, the Cœur Défense skyscraper, the Macau Light Rail Transit, and the Fondation Louis Vuitton pour la création amongst others. Since the 1960s, the company began to organise into different subsidiaries and to develop its international business. In 2012, Setec acquired the American MWH's Brazilian subsidiary, after which it was rebranded as setec hidrobrasileira.

== History ==
Setec was established in 1957 by two engineers, Henri Grimond and Guy Saias, with the goal of carrying out complex and innovative construction projects. One of the first activities undertaken by the firm was a technical study for the then-proposed Channel Tunnel between the UK and France. Setec went on to secure work on multiple aspects of the Channel Tunnel, including as the independent engineering project manager for its construction as well as to produce assessments of claimed costs by contractors. Even following its completion in 1994, the company continued to be periodically involved in the tunnel's operations. Following the 1996 Channel Tunnel fire, Setec assessed the structural damage to the tunnel's concrete lining ahead of repairs commencing. It has also been involved a design study on the potential use of the Channel for cooling purposes.

In 1998, it was involved in the Cœur Défense skyscraper; two years later, Setec also worked on the Peking opera.

Setec, alongside the SNCF, was the project manager for the Millau Viaduct, the world's tallest bridge at the time of its completion in 2003. It has also undertaken multiple projects involving Charles de Gaulle Airport, including the CDG Express rail link.

Setec has been involved in various civil engineering works for the UK's High Speed 2 railway line; as a member of the ASC joint venture with Arcadis and COWI A/S, it devised the prefabricated modular construction approach for the Thame Valley Viaduct, as well as the route's longest bridge, the Colne Valley Viaduct.

In 2009, it became involved in the Flamanville Nuclear Power Plant and the first ERP reactor. Via the ICOSH consortium, Setec has also been partially responsible for the design of the UK's next generation of civil nuclear powerplants, having been appointed to work on both the Sizewell C plant in Suffolk and Hinkley Point C in Somerset.

== Key figures ==
Setec group key figures setec:
Year	2000	2001	2002	2003	2004	2005	2006	2007	2008	2009	2010	2011	2012
Revenue (€m)	105	105	110	112	125	129	134	143	170	186	201	235	250
Employees	870	900	950	961	1,017	1,100	1,200	1,300	1,500	1,700	1,900	2,100	2,200
