= Ministry of Transport and Logistics (Morocco) =

Government ministry of Morocco

- وزارة النقل واللوجيستيك ⵜⴰⵎⴰⵡⴰⵙⵜ ⵏ ⵡⴰⵙⵙⴰⵢ ⴷ ⵜⵍⵓⵊⵉⵙⵜⵉⵜ; Ministre du Transport et de la Logistique

Ministry overview
- Jurisdiction: Government of Morocco
- Headquarters: Rabat, Morocco
- Ministry executive: Abdessamad Kayouh, Minister of Transport and Logistics
- Website: www.transport.gov.ma/fr

The Ministry of Transport and Logistics (Note: Arabic: وزارة النقل واللوجيستيك Standard Moroccan Tamazight: ⵜⴰⵎⴰⵡⴰⵙⵜ ⵏ ⵡⴰⵙⵙⴰⵢ ⴷ ⵜⵍⵓⵊⵉⵙⵜⵉⵜ French: Ministère du Transport et de la Logistique) is the ministry of the Government of Morocco responsible for transport policy and for the regulation of logistics activities in Morocco. Its remit covers road, rail, maritime and air transport, as well as road safety and the development of logistics infrastructure and services.

The ministry's headquarters are located in Rabat. Since 2024, the Minister of Transport and Logistics has been Abdessamad Kayouh.

== History ==
The administration responsible for transport in Morocco traces its origins to 1912, when these functions were incorporated into the General Directorate of Public Works. During this period, this administration oversaw the development of major public infrastructure, including roads, ports and railways, alongside other sectors such as mining and telecommunications.

The institutional framework governing transport has since been modified several times. In 1977, the transport sector was separated from the Ministry of Public Works with the creation of a dedicated ministerial department. In 2002, the transport and public works portfolios were brought together again within a single ministry. In 2013, responsibility for logistics was added to the department’s scope. The present Ministry of Transport and Logistics was established in 2021, following the separation of the transport and logistics portfolio from the Ministry of Equipment, Transport, Logistics and Water.

== Missions ==
Within the framework of the legislative and regulatory provisions in force, and in coordination with other ministerial departments and public institutions concerned, the Ministry of Transport and Logistics is responsible for the development and implementation of government policy in the fields of road transport, merchant shipping, civil aviation, rail transport and logistics.

Its main responsibilities include:

- Developing and implementing government policy relating to road, rail and maritime transport;
- Preparing and coordinating the implementation of government policy concerning air transport, airport infrastructure and air navigation;
- Developing and coordinating national policy on road safety;
- Implementing government policy for the development of logistics activities;
- Promoting cooperation with national and international stakeholders involved in the transport and logistics sectors.

Within the limits of its legal competences, the ministry may also, at the request of other ministerial departments, local authorities, public establishments, associations recognized as being of public utility or state-owned companies:

- Conduct, monitor or supervise technical studies;
- Carry out technical works or ensure the technical supervision of works carried out by third parties.

== Organization ==
The ministry is organized around a central administration that includes:

- General Secretariat
- General Inspectorate
- Directorate of Strategy, Steering and Coordination with Transport Modes
- Directorate of Administrative, Legal and General Affairs
- Directorate of Information Systems
- General Directorate of Civil Aviation
  - The Direction Générale de l’Aviation Civile serves as Morocco’s civil aviation authority, while the Bureau d’Enquêtes et d’Analyses d’Accidents d’Aviation Civile is responsible for the investigation of civil aviation accidents.
- Directorate of Air Transport
- Directorate of Civil Aviation
- Directorate of Road Transport
- Directorate of Merchant Marine

== Establishments under its supervision ==
- National Railways Office (ONCF)
- The National Agency for Road Safety (NARSA)
- The Moroccan Agency for Logistics Development (AMDL)
- The National Company of Transport and Logistics (SNTL)
- Airports of Morocco
- Royal Air Maroc (RAM)
- The Mohamed VI International Academy of Civil Aviation (AIAC)
- The Higher Institute of Maritime Studies (ISEM)

== See also ==
- Transport in Morocco
- Rail transport in Morocco
