= Mohamed Abdeljalil =

Moroccan politician (born 1968)

Mohammed Abdeljalil

Minister of Transport & Logistics
- In office 7 October 2021 – 23 October 2024
- Monarch: Mohammed VI of Morocco
- Prime Minister: Aziz Akhannouch
- Preceded by: Abdelkader Aamara
- Succeeded by: Abdessamad Kayouh

Personal details
- Born: 4 August 1968 (age 58)
- Education: École des ponts ParisTech (B); Hassania School of Public Works (MBA)

Mohammed Abdeljalil (born 4 August 1968) is a Moroccan politician. Previously, he had served as Minister of Transport & Logistics from 7 October 2021 until 23 October 2024.

== Education ==
Abdeljalil holds a Bachelor of Engineering (1991) from the École des ponts ParisTech and a Master of Business Administration (2001) from the Hassania School of Public Works.

== Career ==
From 1991 until 1993, Abdeljalil worked at the American company Arthur Andersen in Paris as an auditor.

In 1993, he returned to Morocco to work for Bymaro as manager for the pretreatment station of El Hank and later as commercial director.

In 2003, Abdeljalil was appointed director of programs and studies at the Ministry of Equipment and Transport.

Between 2005 and 2021, he worked at the Office for Port Operations (ODEP), which became Marsa Maroc in 2006. He was Director General of the Office of Port Operations and then chairman of the board of directors of Marsa Maroc.

Between 7 October 2021 and 23 October 2024, Abdeljalil was the Minister of Transport and Logistics.
