= Tanger-Ville Railway Terminal =

Train stop in Morocco

Tanger-Ville محطة طنجة المدينة
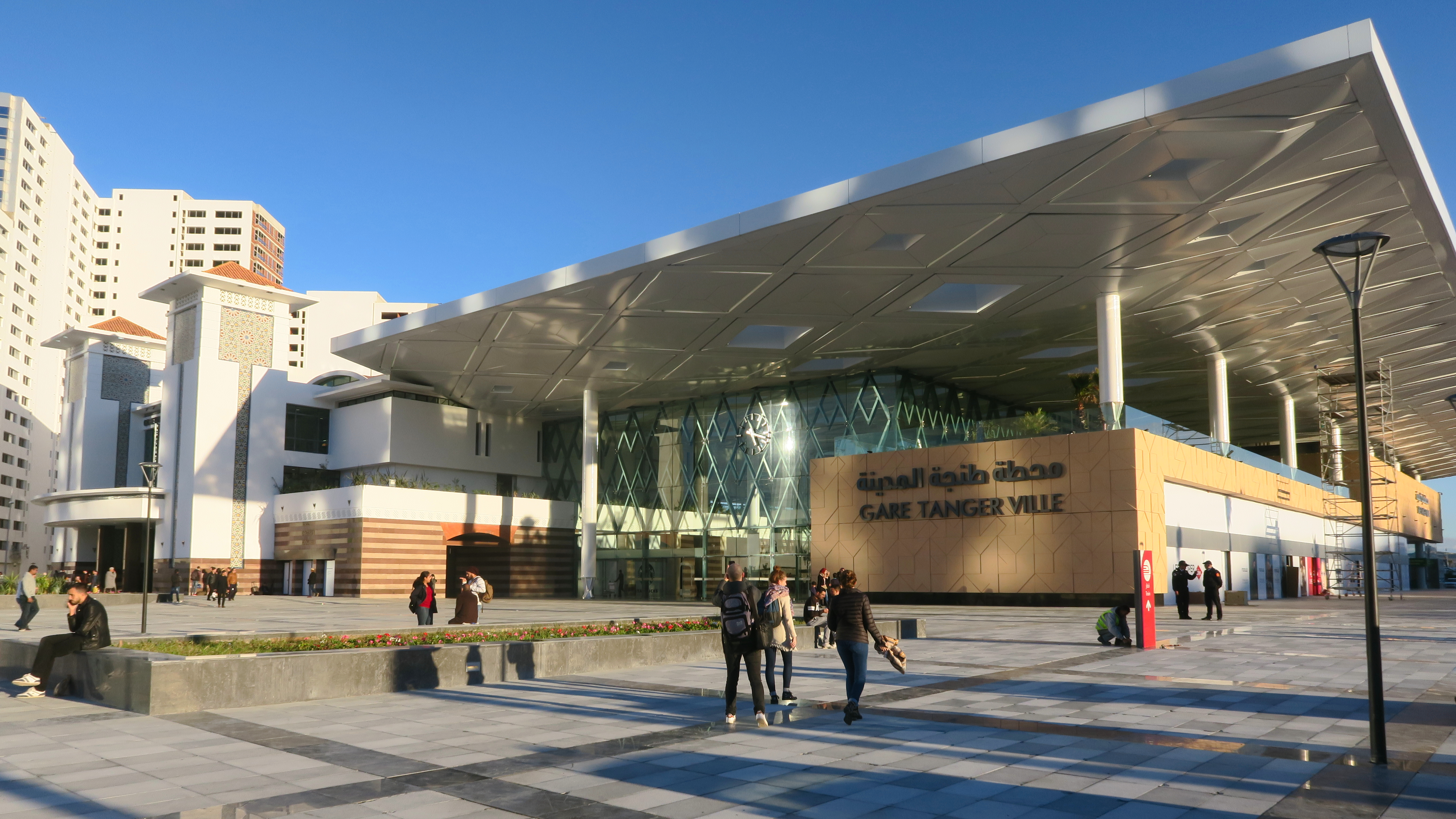
- The station in 2018, following the opening of the high-speed line

General information
- Location: Tangier; Morocco
- Coordinates: 35°46′17″N 5°47′10″W
- Owner: Kingdom of Morocco
- Operator: ONCF
- Platforms: 2 side platforms, 3 island platforms
- Tracks: 8

History
- Opened: 2003

Services
Preceding station		Following station
Terminus	Al-Boraq	Kenitra towards Casa-Voyageurs
Location
- Location within Morocco

The Tanger-Ville Railway Terminal (Arabic: محطة طنجة المدينة; French: Gare Tanger Ville) is a train terminal administered by ONCF in Tangier, Morocco. The station is the terminus of the Al-Boraq line, which was inaugurated as the first high-speed rail line in Africa in November 2018.
