= Railway stations in Morocco =

This article shows a list of railway stations in Morocco. The stations are managed by the national operator ONCF.

== Stations served ==
In cooperation with bus-operator Supratours the ONCF offers combination-tickets to many cities without a railway station. These destinations are not included in the list below.

=== Existing ===
Station name	Date of opening	City	Coordinate location	Image
Aïn Sebaâ train station		Casablanca	33.6086°N 7.52444°W	
Amir Abdelkader train station		Meknes	33.8999°N 5.54557°W	
Asilah train station		Asilah	35.4823°N 6.02377°W	
Ben Guerir train station		Ben Guerir	32.2465°N 7.95864°W	
Bouskoura train station		Casablanca	33.4608°N 7.65133°W	
Bouznika train station		Bouznika	33.7903°N 7.16195°W	
Casa-Port railway station	1907	Casablanca	33.599181°N 7.611875°W	
Casablanca Voyageurs	1923	Casablanca	33.5895°N 7.5908°W	
El Jadida train station		El Jadida	33.2184°N 8.51061°W	
Ennassim train station		Casablanca	33.5175°N 7.65839°W	
Faculties train station		Casablanca	33.5412°N 7.64991°W	
Fes railway station	2009-11-27	Fez	34.0475°N 5.00564°W; 34.04778°N 5.005°W	
Kenitra-Medina train station		Kenitra	34.2519°N 6.58028°W	
Kénitra-Ville railway station	1920	Kenitra	34.2519°N 6.58028°W	
Khouribga train station	1923	Khouribga	32.8837°N 6.90891°W	
Ksar Sghir train station		Ksar es-Seghir	35.8452°N 5.54797°W	
Marrakesh railway station	1923; 2008	Marrakesh	31.630944°N 8.01725°W	
Meknes city train station		Meknes	33.896954°N 5.531962°W	
Melloussa train station		Melloussa	35.7218°N 5.65932°W	
Mers Sultan train station		Casablanca	33.5698°N 7.60868°W	
Mohammed V airport train station		Casablanca	33.3738°N 7.57993°W	
Mohammedia train station		Mohammedia	33.6954°N 7.38762°W	
Oasis railway station	1912	Casablanca	33.554527°N 7.631508°W	
Oujda train station	1928	Oujda	34.685585°N 1.926057°W	
Rabat-Agdal	1925	Rabat	34.002°N 6.856253°W	
Rabat-City train station	1923	Rabat	34.016525°N 6.835566°W	
Safi train station		Safi	32.2858°N 9.24416°W	
Salé-City train station		Salé	34.0379°N 6.81568°W	
Salé-Tabriquet Railway Station		Salé	34.0525°N 6.80537°W	
Settat train station		Settat	32.994°N 7.6233°W	
Sidi Ichou train station		Kenitra	34.3027°N 6.4315°W	
Sidi Kacem train station		Sidi Kacem	34.2316°N 5.71901°W	
Skhirat train station		Skhirat	33.8544°N 7.03905°W	
Skhour Rehamna train station		Skhour Rehamna	32.4695°N 7.9121°W	
Tanger-Med train station		Tangier	35.8843°N 5.5°W	
Tanger-Morora		Tangier	35.7527°N 5.7872°W	
Tanger-Ville	2003	Tangier	34.2519°N 6.58028°W	
Taourirt train station		Taourirt	34.4088°N 2.89794°W	
Témara train station		Temara	33.9175°N 6.93082°W	
Zenata train station		Casablanca	33.6083°N 7.5244°W	

=== Proposed ===
The current line to Oued Zem will be extended to Beni Mellal.

=== Under Construction ===
The TNR and possibly other rail services will have an infill station at Hay Riad, already under construction.

=== Closed ===
- Bab Ftouh, Fez
- Sidi Hrazem, Fez

=== Freight only ===
Only passenger railway stations are listed above. Settlements such as Agadir and Tetouan have stations exclusively for the cement/freight network.

== See also ==
- Transport in Morocco
