= Morocco 2026 FIFA World Cup bid =

Football World Cup host nation bid

2026 FIFA World Cup Bid
Morocco 2026 ⵍⵎⵖⵔⵉⴱ 2026 (Tamazight) 2026 المَغْرِبْ (Arabic)

Tournament details
- Host country: Morocco
- Teams: 48 (from 6 confederations)
- Venue: 14 (in 12 host cities)

The Morocco 2026 FIFA World Cup bid was Morocco's unsuccessful bid to host the 2026 FIFA World Cup. It competed with the United 2026 bid of Canada, Mexico, and the United States for hosting rights.

== Background ==
The 2026 bid was Morocco's fifth bid to host the FIFA World Cup after four unsuccessful attempts in 1994, 1998, 2006 and 2010 lost out to the United States, France, Germany and South Africa. If successful, it would have been the second African country, after the 2010 tournament in South Africa, to host a World Cup.

== Bid process ==
Bidding for the 2026 FIFA World Cup was postponed due to the 2015 FIFA corruption case and the subsequent resignation of Sepp Blatter. It was then restarted following the FIFA Council meeting on 10 May 2016, wherein the bidding process consisted of four phases:

- May 2016 – May 2017: a new strategy and consultation phase
- June 2017 – Dec 2017: enhanced phases for bid preparation
- March 2018 – June 2018: bid evaluation
- June 2018: final decision

With no rival bid having emerged since April 2017, the CONCACAF member federations of Canada, Mexico and the United States sent a joint request to FIFA to hasten the bid process. Canada, Mexico, and the United States wanted FIFA to award the bid outside the traditional bidding process at the June 2018 FIFA Congress in Moscow if the CONCACAF bid met FIFA requirements.

However, the FIFA Council decided on 8 May 2017 that FIFA would have a full bidding procedure. To ensure continental rotation of hosting duties, only the member associations of CAF, CONCACAF, CONMEBOL and the OFC were invited, as these continental confederations had not hosted the two previous World Cups. A date of 11 August 2017 was set for submission of an intention to bid, and on that day, the Royal Moroccan Football Federation announced that it would submit a bid for the 2026 FIFA World Cup. In March 2018, the Morocco 2026 bid committee stated their plan to spend $16 billion on preparing for the tournament, including building new transportation infrastructure, 21 new hospitals, a large number of new hotels and leisure facilities, and building and/or renovating new stadiums.

== FIFA Football tournament hosting experiences ==
Morocco has previously hosted a number of international football events.

- 1988 Africa Cup of Nations
- 1997 African Youth Championship
- 2011 CAF U-23 Championship
- 2013 African U-17 Championship
- 2013 FIFA Club World Cup
- 2014 FIFA Club World Cup
- 2018 African Nations Championship
- 2022 FIFA Club World Cup
- 2022 Women's Africa Cup of Nations
- 2023 U-23 Africa Cup of Nations
- 2024 Women's Africa Cup of Nations
- 2024 CAF Women's Champions League
- 2025 FIFA U-17 Women's World Cup
- 2025 U-17 Africa Cup of Nations
- 2025 Africa Cup of Nations
- 2026 U-17 Africa Cup of Nations

== Bid committee ==
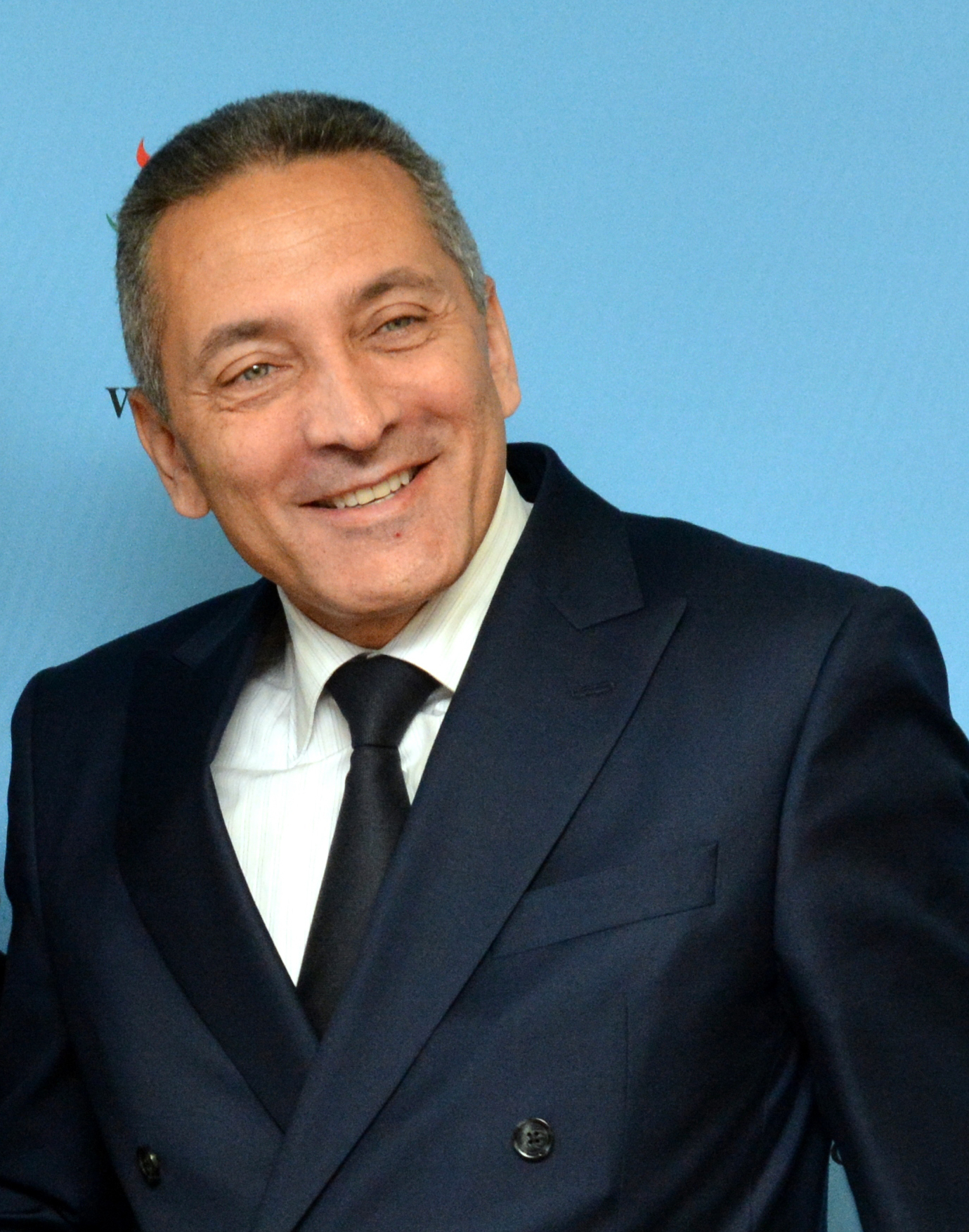
Moulay Hafid Elalamy in March 2014

On 10 January 2018, King Mohammed VI appointed Moulay Hafid Elalamy as chairman of the bid committee.

Two days later the London-based agency VERO Communications was appointed as Lead Communications and Strategy Consultants of the Moroccan bid.

- Transportation infrastructure: new rail connections, new roads as well as highways and new aeroports or terminals.
- The healthcare system: about 21 new hospitals.
- The tourism industry: a large number of new hotels and leisure facilities.
- Sports infrastructure: about 130 football stadiums will be built or renovated (Morocco presently has 38 stadiums with 10,000 or more capacity)

== Bid venues ==
Stadiums must have been able to accommodate a 1,900-square-metre (20,000 sq ft) hospitality village no more than 150 metres (490 ft) from the stadium. They must also have had a capacity of at least 40,000 for group and second round matches, 60,000 for the semi-finals, and 80,000 for the opening match and final. On 22 August 2017, Morocco established a list of stadia for its bid.

| Casablanca | | Marrakesh | |
|---|---|---|---|
| Grand Stade de Casablanca (planned) | New Modular Stadium (planned) | Marrakesh Stadium (to be renovated) | Stade Mohammed V (planned) |
| Capacity: 93,000 | Capacity: 46,000 | Capacity: 45,250; Capacity for WC: 69,565 | Capacity: 46,000 |
| Rabat | Agadir | Tangier | Fez |
| Prince Moulay Abdellah Stadium (to be renovated) | Adrar Stadium (to be renovated) | Ibn Batouta Stadium (to be renovated) | Fez Stadium (to be renovated) |
| Capacity: 52,000; Capacity for WC: 46,500 | Capacity: 45,480; Capacity for WC: 46,048 | Capacity: 45,000; Capacity for WC: 65,000 | Current capacity 45,000; Capacity for WC: 46,092 |
| Tétouan | Morocco 2026 FIFA World Cup bid is located in Morocco | | Oujda |
| Stade de Tétouan (Cancelled) | Morocco 2026 FIFA World Cup bid is located in Morocco | | Stade d'Oujda (Ongoing construction start) |
| Capacity: 55,000 | Morocco 2026 FIFA World Cup bid is located in Morocco | | Capacity: 45,600 |
| Meknes | Nador | El Jadida | Ouarzazate |
| Grand stade de Meknès (New Modular Stadium) (planned) | New Modular Stadium (planned) | New Modular Stadium (planned) | New Modular Stadium (planned) |
| Capacity: 46,000 | Capacity: 46,000 | Capacity: 46,000 | Capacity: 46,000 |

=== Urban public transportation system ===
- Taxi: all the proposed cities have their own Taxi fleet.
- Bus: all the proposed cities have their own bus system for the urban public transportation.
- Tram:
  - Existing and under extension/expansion: Rabat/Salé, Casablanca
  - Planned: Tangier, Marrakesh, Fez, Agadir.
- Metro:
  - Planned and temporarily abandoned: Casablanca
- Regional Express Network (RER):
  - Existing and under expansion: Rabat/Salé, Casablanca

=== Highways and roads ===
The Moroccan highway network connects most large cities in the country, being part of the transportation infrastructure in Morocco.

=== Rail network and rail transport ===
Additionally the rail network connects all the proposed venues except Tétouan, Ouarzazate and Agadir. However, there were plans for projects to connect Agadir to the Moroccan high speed network (TGV) via Marrakesh, and to connect Tétouan to the classic rail network via Tangier.

=== Airports and air transport ===
All the selected cities (except El Jadida and Meknes) have their own airports; see list of airports in Morocco. The Mohamed V International Airport in Casablanca is the main international gateway into Morocco.

== Support ==
=== Football confederations ===
- CAF

=== FIFA members ===
- Algeria
- Angola
- Belgium
- Botswana
- Cameroon
- (Democratic Republic of the Congo) Congo DR
- Egypt
- France
- (The Gambia) Gambia
- Guinea-Bissau
- Kenya
- Lebanon
- Libya
- Luxembourg
- Myanmar
- Nigeria
- Palestine
- Qatar
- Russia
- Seychelles
- Senegal
- Serbia
- Tunisia
- Uganda
- Zambia

=== Public opinion ===
The bid committee showed that 97% of Moroccans were in favour of the World Cup, including 81% with strong support. 93% of Moroccans thought the event would have had a positive impact on economy and employment, 91% of Moroccans thought the event would have had a positive impact on sports participation, and 95% of Moroccans were interested in playing football.

=== Government support ===
In January 2018, the Moroccan government stated its full support for Morocco's bid to host the 2026 World Cup.

== Marketing ==
The logo was unveiled on 23 January 2018; it was inspired by the pentagram found on the Moroccan flag. The pentagram was surrounded by seven red leaves and kicking a football.

The slogan for the bid "Together for One Goal" (Arabic: معا لهدف واحد, romanized: maʿan li-hadaf wāḥid) (French: Ensemble pour le même but) was launched on 17 March 2018.

== Concerns, criticism and controversies ==
In FIFA's evaluation report of the two bids, Morocco's bid was rated as being "high risk" for the organisation, compared with the other bid being labelled as low risk. The three categories with the worst scores were: stadiums, accommodation and transportation, which were the most important parts of any bid for the World Cup. The overall bid scored 275 out of 500 points, significantly lower than the 402 scored by the other bid.

In Morocco's previous World Cup bids, it was discovered that in two of those instances, the country's stakeholders tried to bribe voting officials. FIFA issued an integrity warning to the Moroccan bid in January 2018. The general secretary of FIFA Fatma Samoura warned voters in a letter "not to accept any technical or development support which may unduly affect the integrity of the bidding procedure". Moroccan bid officials had at one point discussed a formal relationship with the Confederation of African Football (CAF) which would allow for training camps and other development activities for countries on the continent.

The aforementioned Samoura was referred to FIFA's ethics committee after it was discovered she had familial links to El Hadji Diouf, an ambassador of the bid. There was a complaint that deemed this relationship to be a conflict of interest.

The transportation plans put forward by the bid team were rated as being of high risk for FIFA. Out of all the sections of the bid that were scored, the transportation section received the lowest at 2.1 out of 5. Concerns were raised over the dependence of just one airport for most of the flights (in Casablanca) and the lack of transportation links within cities and stadiums. According to FIFA, the bid relied on high cost infrastructure across all modes of transportation in a shorter amount of time.

The Moroccan bid would have needed to spend about US$16 billion in upgrades to stadiums, building new stadiums and infrastructure. This represented about 16% of the country's GDP (US$100 billion). This was compared with only 6% for public health. Increased spending for the World Cup, with social services receiving cuts, had caused numerous protests during the last World Cup held in 2014 in Brazil. There were no legacy plans for all the newly built stadiums. This was in contrast to the North American bid, which exclusively used existing stadiums and did not require any of the host countries to take on debt.

FIFA had to make a second unscheduled visit to Morocco, after the governing body was not satisfied with the requirements presented in the bid book as deficiencies were discovered, unlike the North American bid. Morocco's bid leader "acknowledged it had to improve the quality of the submission made to FIFA in March [2018] because inadequacies were identified" (by FIFA). When the bid was announced, only a two sentence statement was announced announcing the country's entrance into the competition. With less than six months remaining, Morocco named a chairman for its bid committee and did not have a logo or a website. This was in contrast with the North American bid, which was well ahead in planning at that point.

FIFA's bid evaluation committee expressed concerns over the quality of stadiums proposed by the Moroccan bid. The committee "'noticed some deviations from the initial planned program" [in relations to the stadiums proposed]. Concerns were also raised over the quality of training grounds proposed. The president of the bid, Moulay Hafid Elalamy, mentioned that there was a need to "improve the quality of our bid book". The Moroccan stadiums need extensive modernisation to match the stadiums proposed by the North American bid. The stadium plans put forward by the bid team were rated as being of high risk for FIFA.

FIFA criticised the bid for including several potential white elephant stadiums — expensive venues which their owners could not dispose of and whose costs, particularly those for maintenance, were out of proportion to their usefulness — compared with the North American bid, which used venues that were already in use by professional sports teams. This was done after Morocco complained of the bid process. FIFA replied, "In order to avoid unsustainable bids ... with the creation of 'white elephants' – something FIFA has been heavily criticised for in the past – the scoring system evaluates with objective criteria how meaningful and sustainable is the infrastructure presented in the bids". Morocco was expected to spend US$16 billion if successful in tournament infrastructure, while the North American bid needed no new tournament-specific infrastructure. This put much more risk on FIFA if it selected the Moroccan bid, as listed in the evaluation committee's review of the two bids. The Moroccan bid committee accepted the fact that it could not host the event tomorrow, but the North American bid could.

Security was a concern for the bid. Morocco is in the North African region which has experienced political instability and terrorist attacks in neighbouring countries of Tunisia, Libya and Egypt. A terror attack happened in 2011 in Marrakesh, a proposed host city for the bid. A total of 17 people were killed in the attack at Jemaa el-Fnaa Square, which was also the proposed fan site if the bid was successful.

FIFA rated the bid with a medium risk for human rights and labour standards. Further concerns were raised when stray dogs were put to death by gunshot while the FIFA inspection committee was there.

Morocco did not mention that homosexuality is illegal in the country in its bid book. There was also no attempt how this would be mitigated (for LGBT athletes and fans) if the country was given the right to host the World Cup. FIFA's guidelines for World Cup hosts explicitly mentioned that "host countries must guarantee there is no discrimination of any nature". Ahmed El Haij, president of the Moroccan Association for Human Rights, told the Associated Press, "it is evident that if Morocco was to host the World Cup, LGBT people coming to watch the games will face a lot of discrimination. The state will not be able to protect them nor will it be able to commit in preventing measures that could be taken against them by both the state and society".

The Morocco bid projected a revenue of just US$785 million, which was less than half of what the North American bid projected (at US$1.8 billion). This was the primary reason that FIFA president Gianni Infantino thought of preferring the North American bid.

In its bid book, Morocco acknowledged issues with "ultra" fans, which are also known as violent supporters. This was highlighted in February 2018, when 65 people were arrested and vandalism was caused at a stadium in Marrakesh.

FIFA expressed concerns over Morocco's hotel capacity. The country was expected to invest US$3.2 billion in hotel capacity in the lead-up to 2026, if successful in the bid. The evaluation committee had multiple questions in regards to the capacity of the accommodation proposed. About an additional 30,000 hotel rooms were thought to be needed for Morocco to stage the World Cup. The accommodation plans put forward by the bid team were rated as being of high risk for FIFA, while the North American bid was rated as low risk.

There were calls in some countries to not support the bid, due to the Western Sahara conflict. South Africa did not support the bid, after ties between the two nations were strained since 2004 over the Western Sahara issue. Other countries such as Namibia also ruled out voting for Morocco, after it claimed, "It will never support nor align itself with a coloniser".

== Aftermath ==
After losing the 2026 bid, Morocco went on to bid for the 2030 edition and in December 2024 was later unanimously awarded in a joint bid with Portugal and Spain, with centenary games to be held in the South American countries of Argentina, Paraguay and Uruguay.
