= Casablanca railway station =

Casablanca railway station may refer to:

- Casa-Voyageurs railway station, the main terminus and hub
- Casa-Port railway station, a secondary terminus serving suburban lines and the port
- Oasis railway station, serving suburban lines
