= Oasis railway station =

Railway station in Casablanca, Morocco

Oasis Casa-Oasis
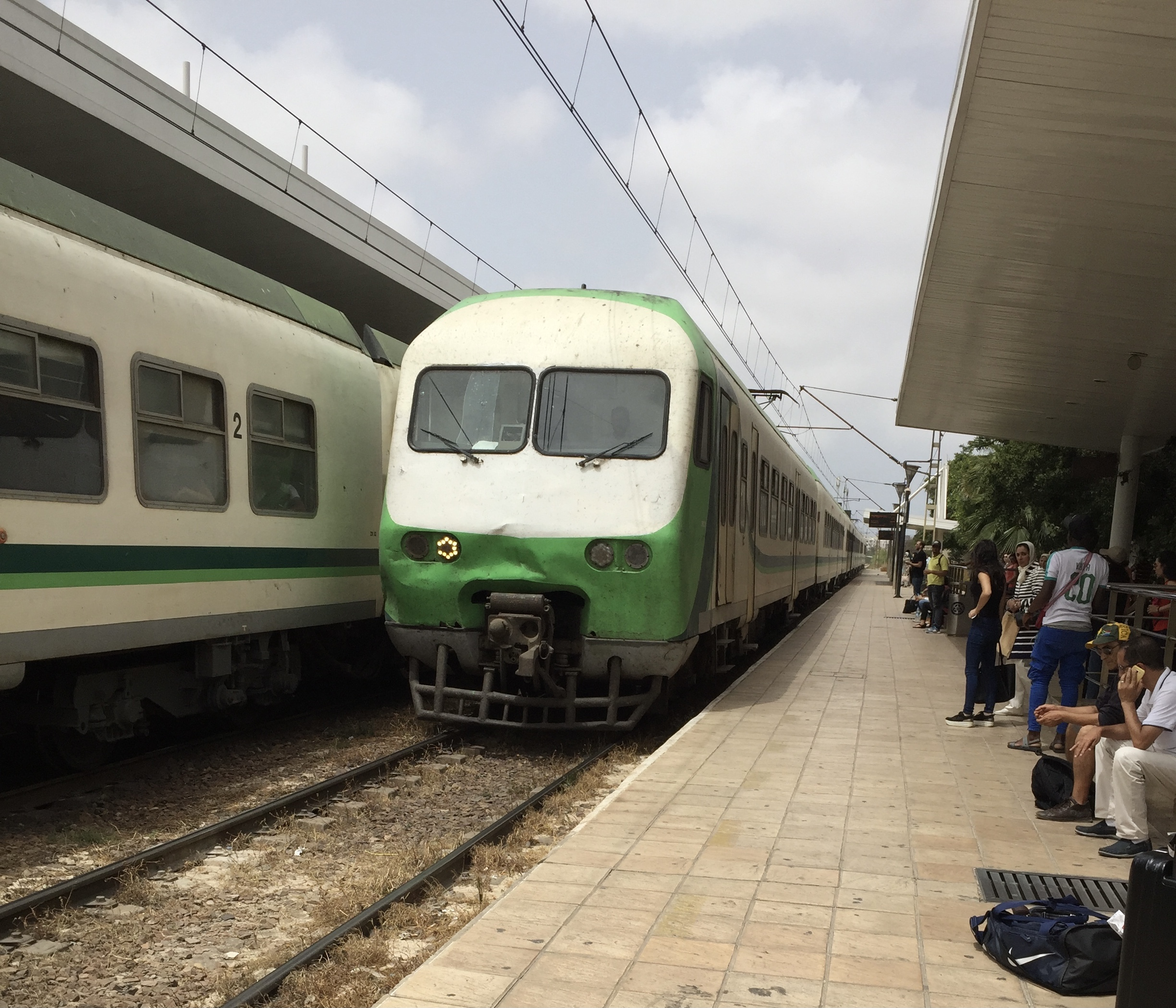

General information
- Location: Route de l'Oasis, 20410 Casablanca-Oasis; Morocco
- Coordinates: 33°33′16″N 7°37′53″W
- Owner: Kingdom of Morocco
- Operator: ONCF
- Platforms: 2
- Connections: Casablanca Tramway Line T1

History
- Opened: 1912
- Rebuilt: 4 January 2005

Services
Preceding station		Following station
Faculté towards Mohammed V Airport	Al Bidaoui	Mers Sultan towards Casa-Port Terminal
Location

Oasis or Casa-Oasis is a railway station in Casablanca in Morocco.

== History ==
The newly renovated station was officially opened on 4 January 2005 after major modernisation work by the ONCF, with a total MAD 13 m investment. The renovations were made to relieve congestion at Casa-Port and Casa-Voyageurs stations. All southern inter-city train services to and from Casa-Voyageurs now call at Casa-Oasis.

== Services ==
Al Bidaoui
TNR Casablanca – Settat
TNR Casablanca – El Jadida
Main line trains
