= TNR =

TNR may refer to:

- TNR, the gene that encodes the protein Tenascin-R
- Ivato International Airport, Antananarivo, Madagascar, IATA code
- The New Republic, an American magazine of politics and the arts
- Times New Roman, a popular typeface installed on most desktop computers
- Train Navette Rapide, an express train service in Morocco
- Trap-neuter-return, a method for managing feral cats
- T.N.Rajarathnam Pillai (1898-1956), Indian musician
- True negative rate, in statistics
