= Casablanca Metro =

Proposed public transport system in Morocco

The Casablanca Metro was a public transport project dating from the 1970s in Casablanca, Morocco. It was designed to address the need for public transport in Casablanca, which suffers from traffic congestion caused by the city's growth. The project was abandoned and then reopened several times, most recently in 2013, when the city announced that it will build a 15-kilometer long metro line above ground, connecting the city's Sidi Moumen neighbourhood with the Boulevard de la Corniche near the Hassan II Mosque. However, on June 30, 2014, the Casablanca city council decided to abandon the metro project due to high costs; instead, the city will focus on expanding its existing tram lines.

== History ==
Formally launched in the 1980s, the project has never been continued due to geographical reasons. A lot of alternatives were presented and accepted, like the combination of the Casablanca Tramway and RER system, which is designed to offer coverage similar to the planned metro system.

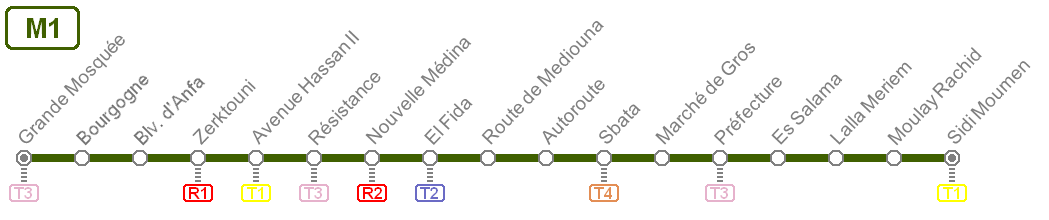
The Casablanca elevated metro line, as proposed in 2013.
