= Belvedere (Casablanca) =

Coordinates: 33.5904°N 7.6007°W

Belvedere is a neighborhood of central Casablanca, Morocco. It is in the administrative district of Roches Noires. Belvedere is home to the Casa-Voyageurs Railway Station and the Tachfine Center shopping mall.
