= Casablanca Busway =

Busway system in Casablanca, Morocco

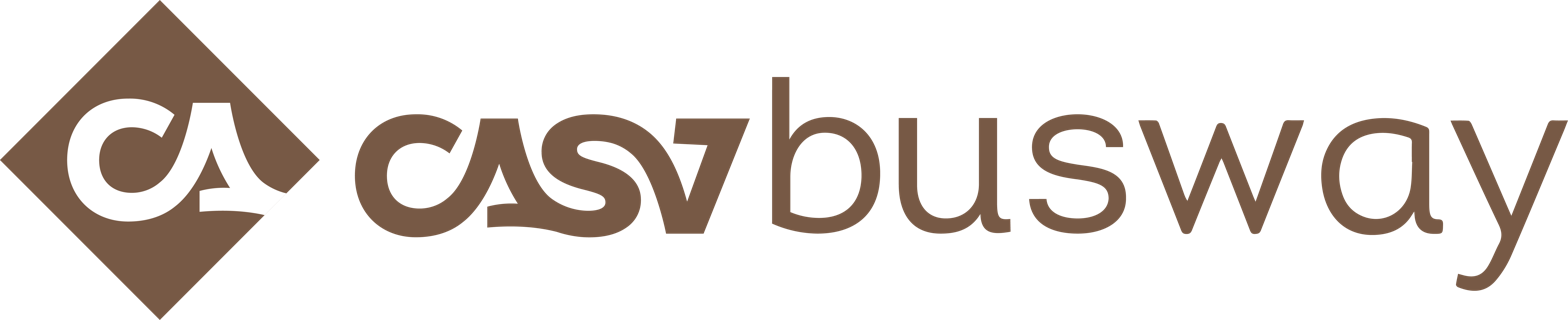

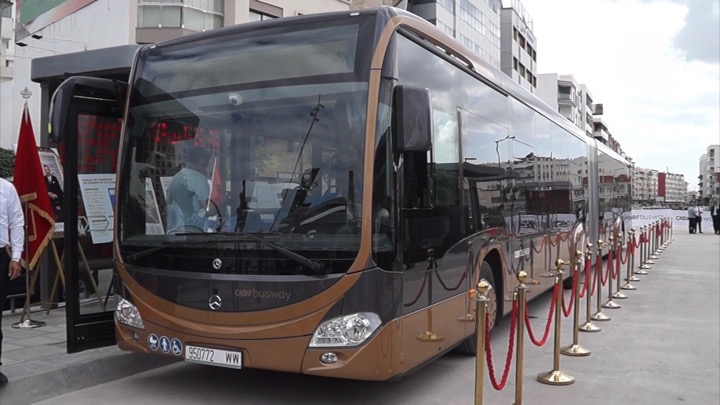
- Mercedes-Benz vehicle on line L6 at CIL station

Overview
- Native name: Arabic: باصواي الدار البيضاء
- Locale: Casablanca, Morocco
- Stations: 42
- Website: https://dimaqrib.ma

Service
- Type: Bus rapid transit
- Services: 2
- Operator: RATP Dev Casablanca
- Rolling stock: 40 Mercedes-Benz.

History
- Opened: 1 March 2024

Technical
- Line length: 24.5 km (15.2 mi)
Route map
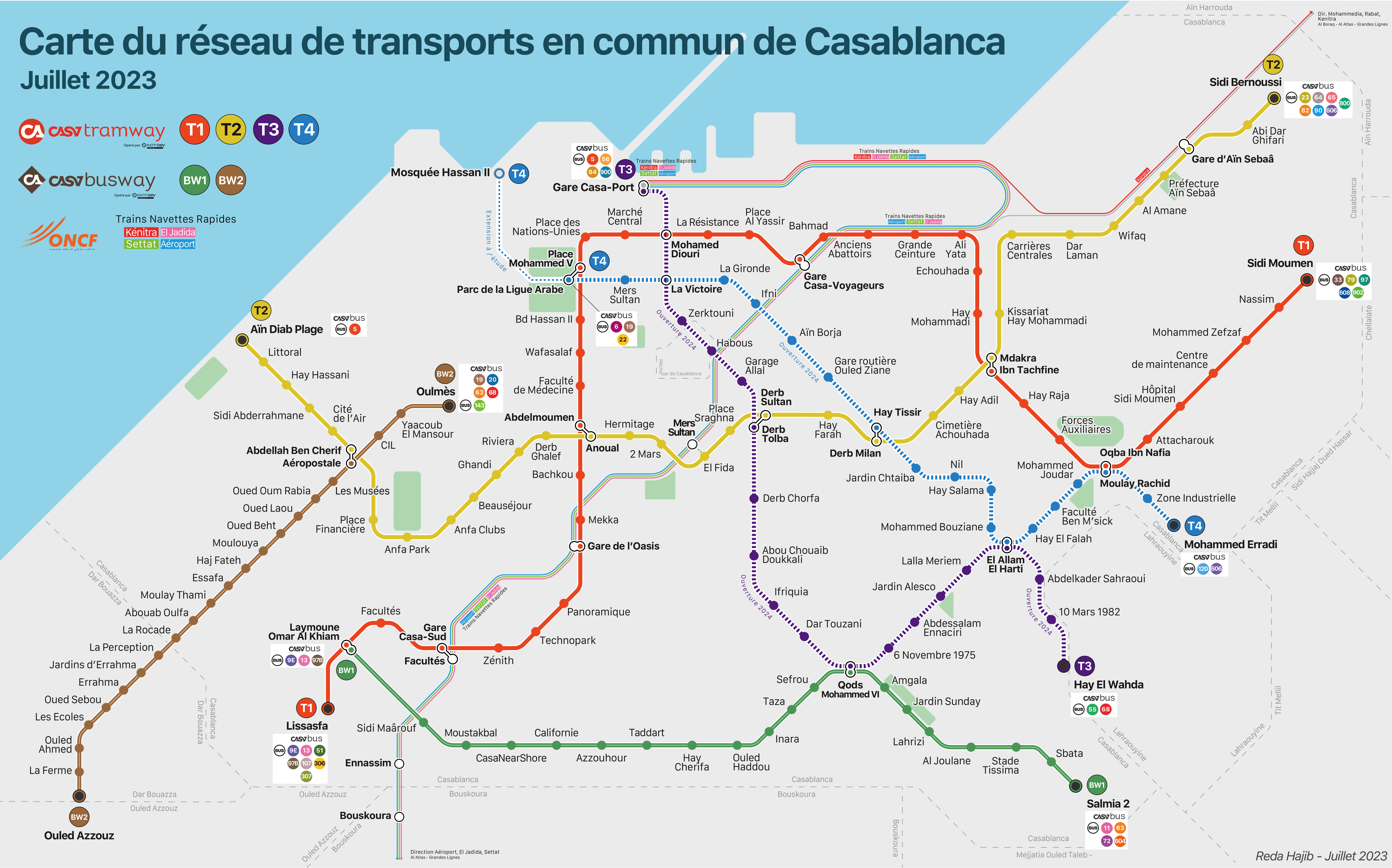

The Casablanca Busway Arabic: باصواي الدار البيضاء Bāswāy ad-Dār al-Bayḍā’) is a high-level bus network serving the city of Casablanca in Morocco since 1st March 2024. The network consists of two lines, line BW1 and the line BW2 .

== Current network ==
Line	Terminus	Opening	Length (km)	Stations
BW1	Laymoune to Salmia 2	2023	12,5	20
BW2	Oulmès to Oued Sebou	2023	12	18
TOTAL			24,5	38

=== Line BW1 ===
As of 2023, Line 1 of the Casablanca Busway serves 20 stations between termini in Salmia and Lissasfa. The line is 12.5 km (7.8 mi).

=== Line BW2 ===
As of 2023, Line 2 of the Casablanca Busway serves 20 stations between termini in Maarif and Errahma. The line is 12 km (7.5 mi). An extension of the BW2 line is being built beyond Errahma to reach the rural commune of Ouled Azzouz. The call for tenders relating to the completion of this extension project was launched in January 2023. This 2.5 km extension has 4 stations, which are as follows: Les Ecoles, Ouled Ahmed, La Ferme and Oulad Azzouz.

== See also ==
- Casablanca Tramway
