= Fez railway station =

Railway station in Fez, Morocco

Coordinates: 34.047964°N 5.001507°W

Front view

The Fez railway station (French: Gare de Fes) is the main station in the Moroccan city of Fez. While there are secondary stations for local connections, this station serves long-distance mainline trains.

== Rail network ==
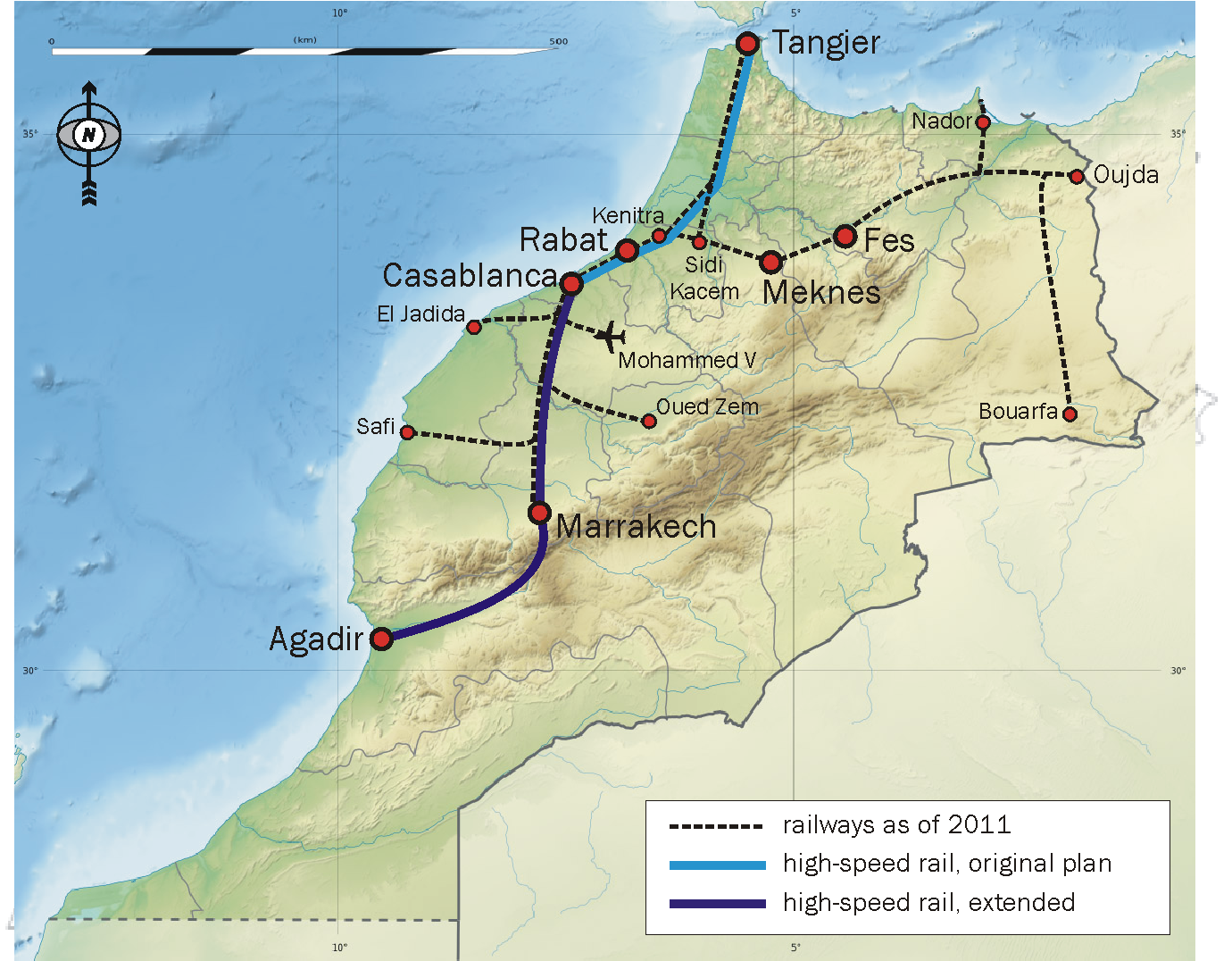
Map of the mainline

Fez lies on the east–west mainline in northern Morocco and offers direct connections to Oujda and Nador in the east, Tangier in the north, and via transfer at Meknes, the main northwest line to Rabat, Casablanca, and Marrakesh.

== Electrification ==
A part of the Moroccan mainline network is electrified. On the west-to-east mainline, Fez is the endpoint of the electrified tracks. Trains to and from Taourirt, Oujda, and Nador are powered by diesel locomotives, while trains from the west terminating in Fez or heading to Tangier use electric locomotives.

== Connections ==
There are four trains per day from Nador to Fez, with the same frequency from Oujda. One of the daily trains to and from Oujda is a hotel train offering only couchette places, with couchette tickets available on all night trains. Travel time from Fez to Nador is approximately 6 hours, and to Oujda, about 5.5 hours.

The Fez–Meknes–Rabat route, continuing to Casablanca, is by far the busiest long-distance line, with 18 daily trains, 8 of which continue from Casablanca to Marrakech. The journey to Marrakech railway station takes approximately 8.5 hours.

== Modernising ==
The Office National des Chemins of Fer (ONCF), the state company operating the railways, invests significant resources into modernising the network. The stations in Marrakech and Fez have been rebuilt in recent years, and the Taourirt-Nador branch line was constructed between 2006 and 2009. A bypass is also being constructed around the city of Meknes to allow some trains to bypass the city.

Additionally, a high-speed line is being built between Tangier and Casablanca, as part of the Kenitra–Tangier high-speed rail line, though this service will not stop at Fez.
