= Marrakesh Railway Station =

Railway station in Marrakesh, Morocco

Marrakesh Railway Station محطة قطار مراكش

General information
- Location: Marrakesh; Morocco
- Coordinates: 31°37′52″N 8°01′02″W
- Owner: ONCF
- Tracks: 6

History
- Opened: 1923
- Rebuilt: 2008

Passengers
- 2007: 3 million
Location

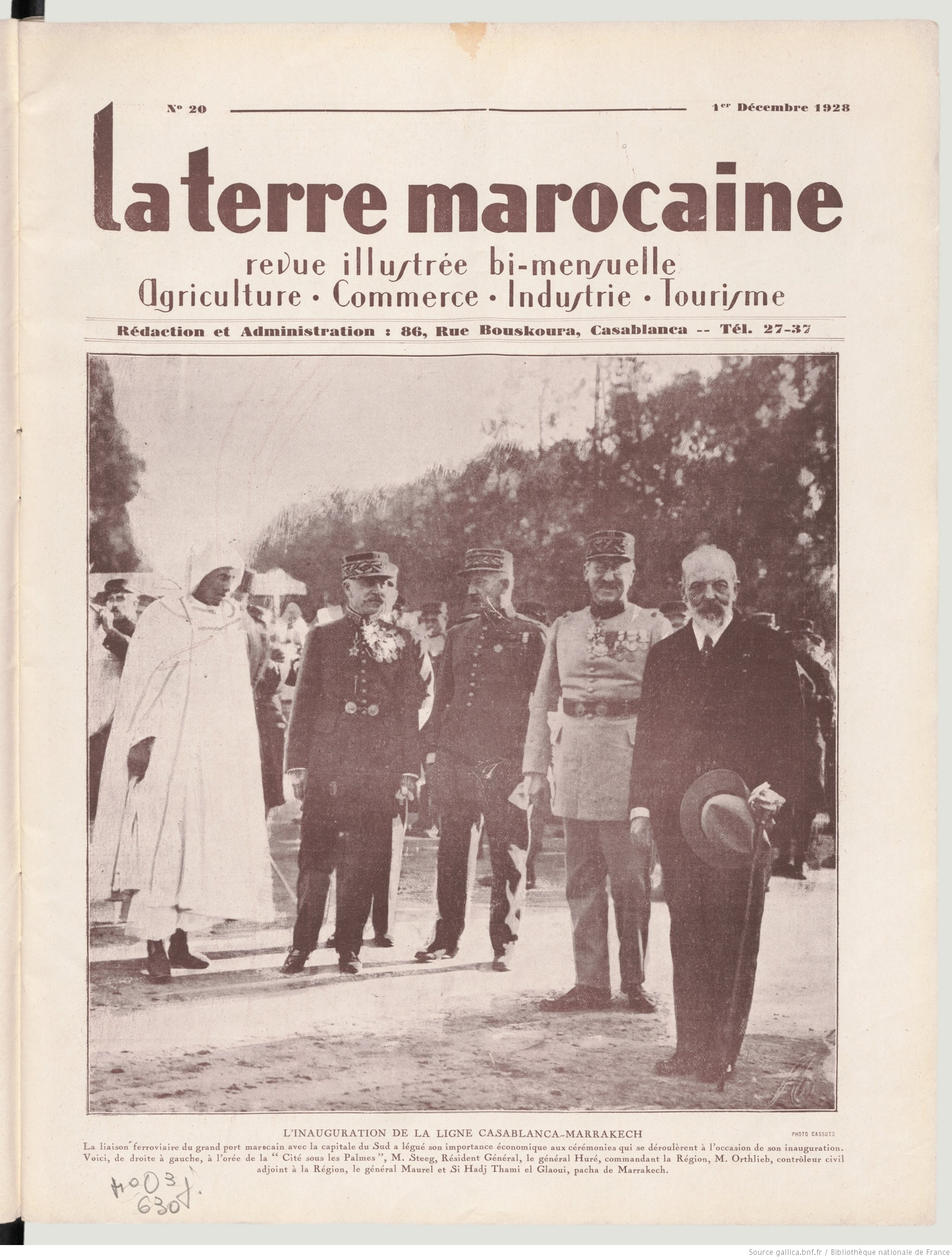
Pasha of Marrakesh, Thami El Glaoui, with Resident-General Théodore Steeg and other colonists celebrating the inauguration of the Casablanca-Marrakesh railway line December 1, 1928.

The Marrakesh Railway Station (Arabic: محطة قطار مراكش) is a railway station in Marrakesh, Morocco; it is currently the southern end-point of the Moroccan railway system. The current station was opened on August 10, 2008.

From Marrakesh there is a direct rail link to Casablanca and Fez. Station Casablanca Voyageurs offers connections to Tangier or Oujda.

== Station building ==
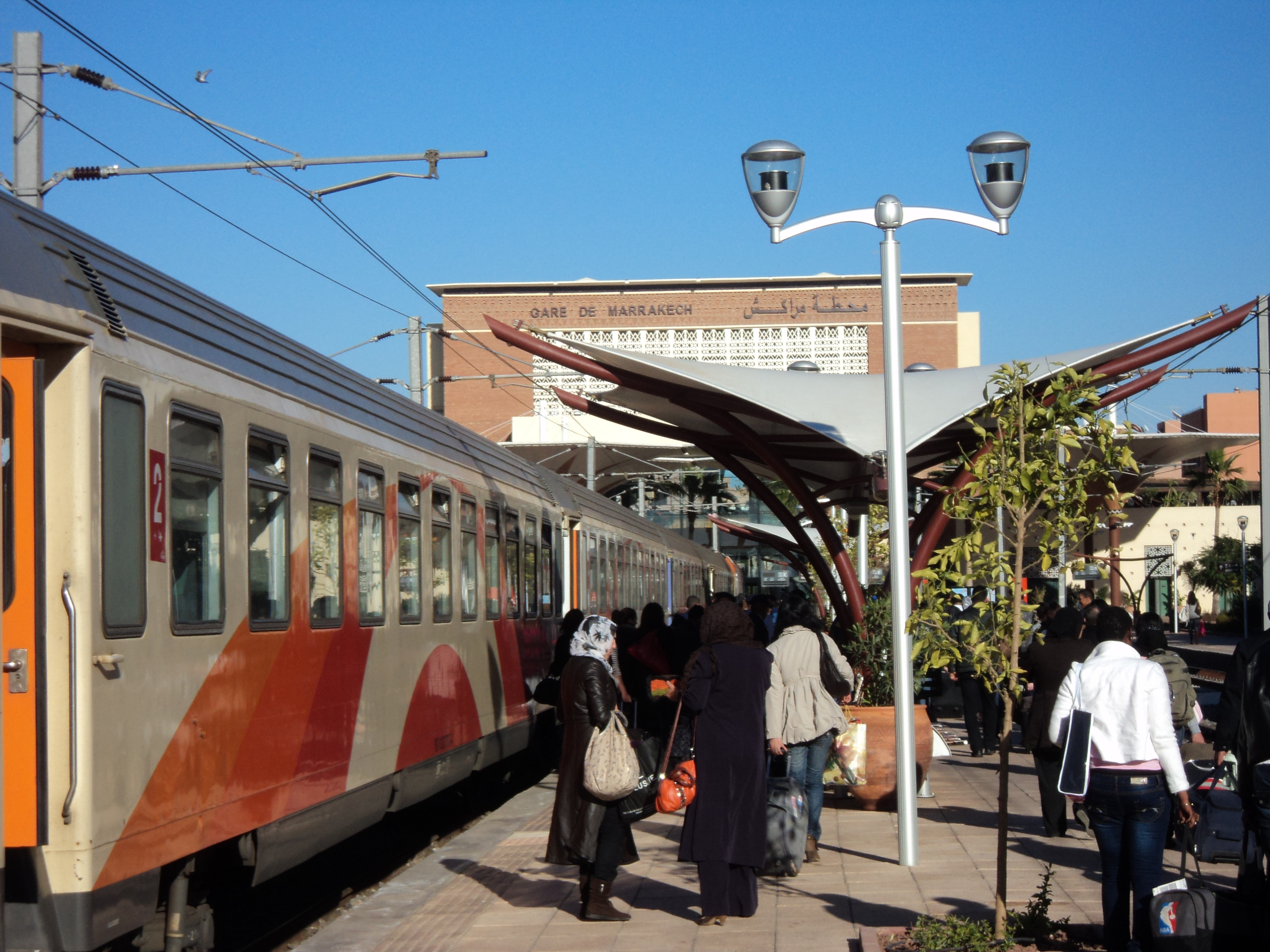
Platforms at Marrakesh Railway Station

The old station, built in 1923 during French protectorate time, was located along Hasan II Avenue and served as a terminus of the rail system. It was within walking distance of the new city-centre (French Quarter) district and Royal Theatre.

In 2008 a newly constructed station was opened adjacent to the old building and tracks were extended. The new station, located 100 meters closer to the city-centre district (and directly opposite the Royal Theatre), is larger and was built to serve the planned extension of the rail network towards Agadir and Laayoune. It contains several shops and fast food restaurants.

An Ibis Hotel is located directly adjacent to the station.

== Destinations ==
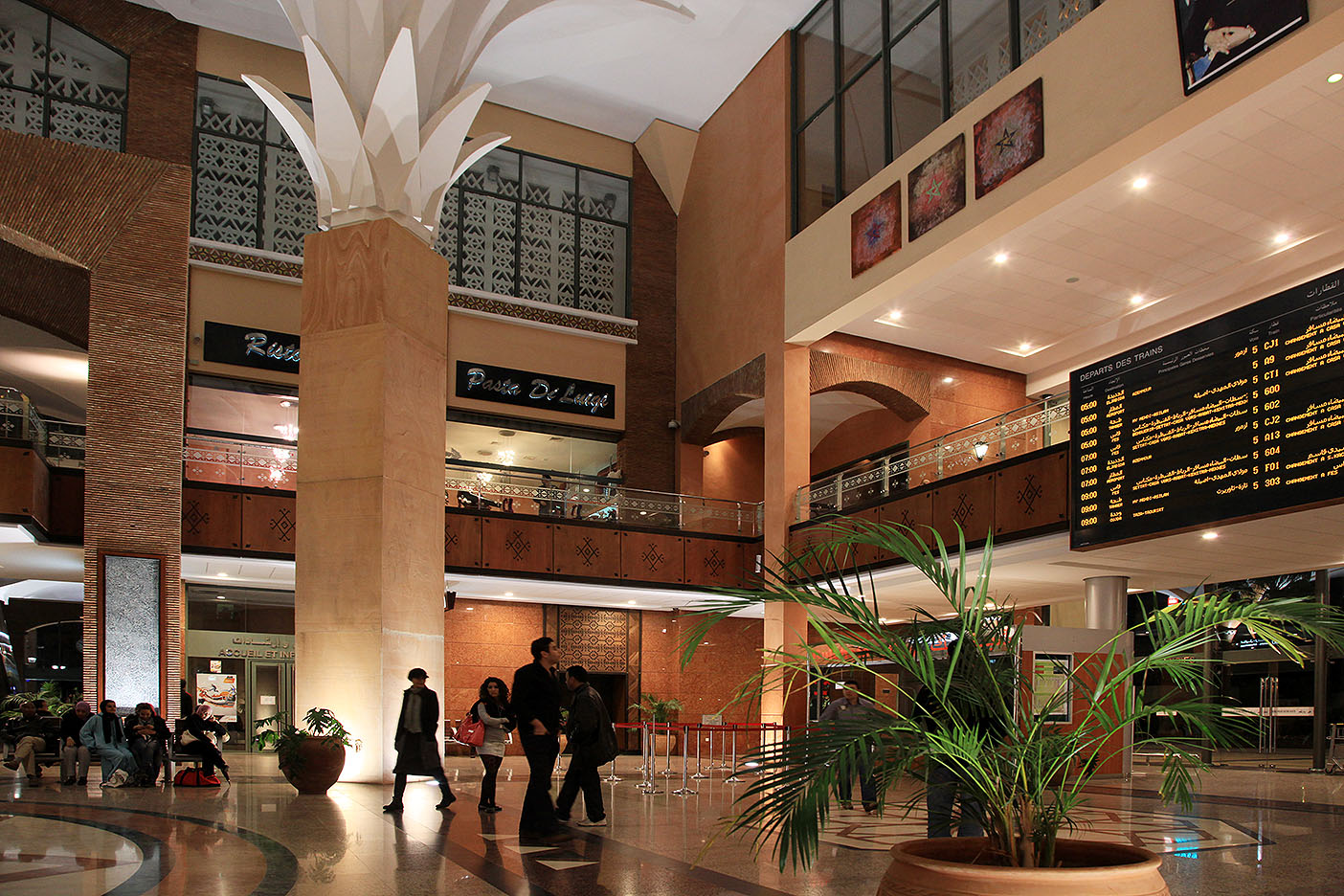
The interior of the Marrakesh Railway Station

There are 16 daily direct trains to Fez via Casablanca Voyageurs station and another two direct connections to Tangier.

Transfers to the main east–west link to Oujda (for Algeria) via Casablanca Voyageurs are possible, as well as the airport shuttle to Mohammed V International Airport. Besides the two direct trains, Tangier can also be reached with a transfer in Casablanca.

The new station was built to facilitate planned high-speed trains and the network will be expanded towards Agadir and Laayoune. In the future, trains will reverse using a new triangular junction west of the station to continue south.

== Use in popular culture ==
Crosby, Stills & Nash referenced the railway in "Marrakesh Express" on their debut album.

== See also ==
- Rail transport in Morocco
- ONCF
