= Rabat–Salé tramway =

Tram system in the Moroccan agglomeration of Rabat and Salé cities

Rabat-Salé tramway
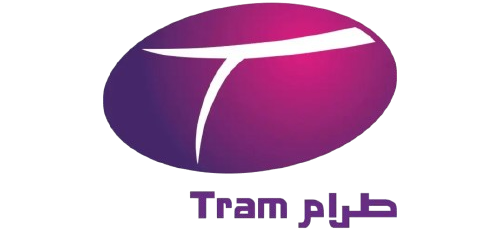

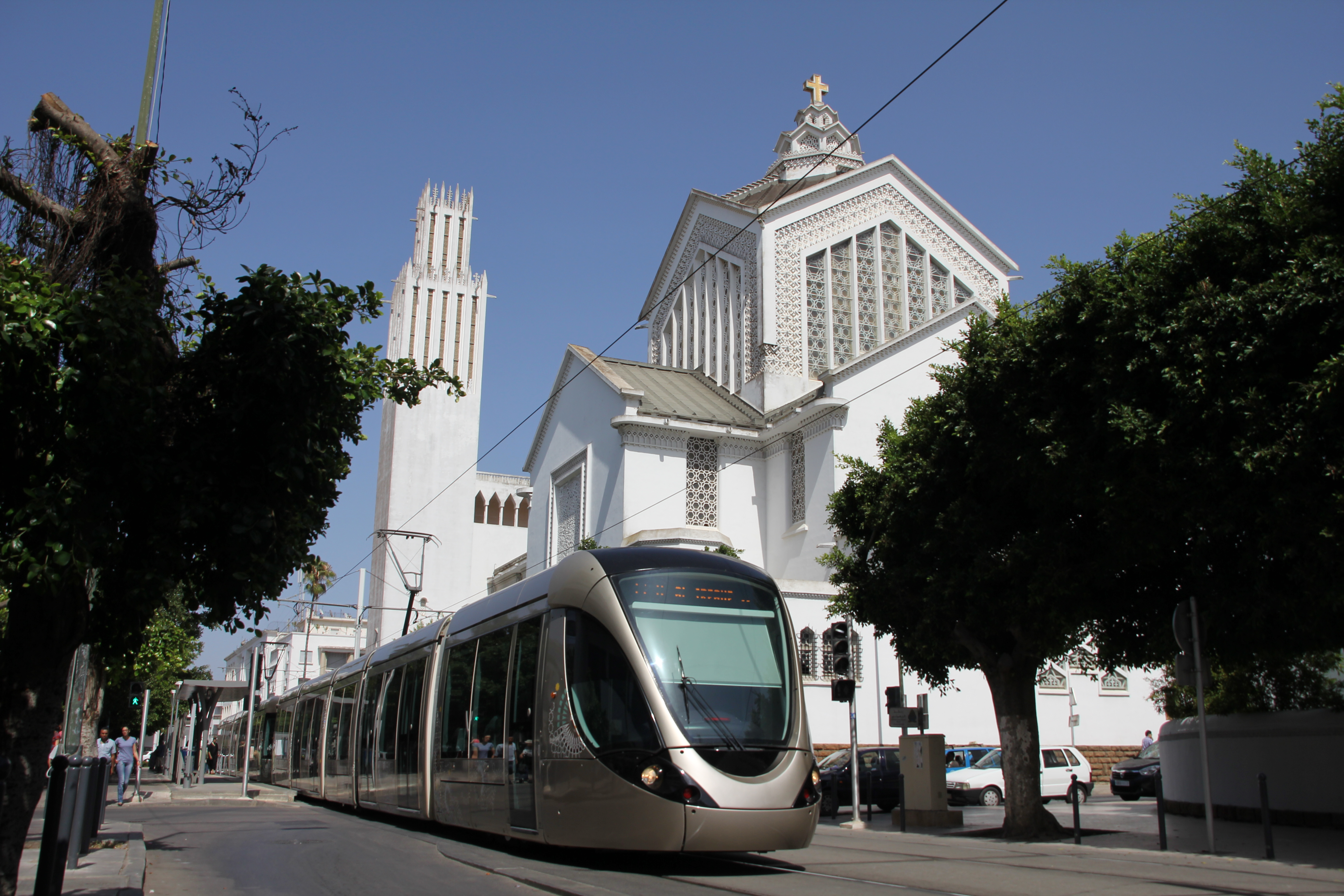

Overview
- Locale: Rabat and Salé, Morocco
- Transit type: Tram
- Number of lines: 2
- Number of stations: 42
- Website: https://www.tram-way.ma/

Operation
- Began operation: 23 May 2011
- Operator: Transdev

Technical
- System length: 26 km (16.2 mi)
- Track gauge: 1,435 mm (4 ft 8 1/2 in) standard gauge
System map
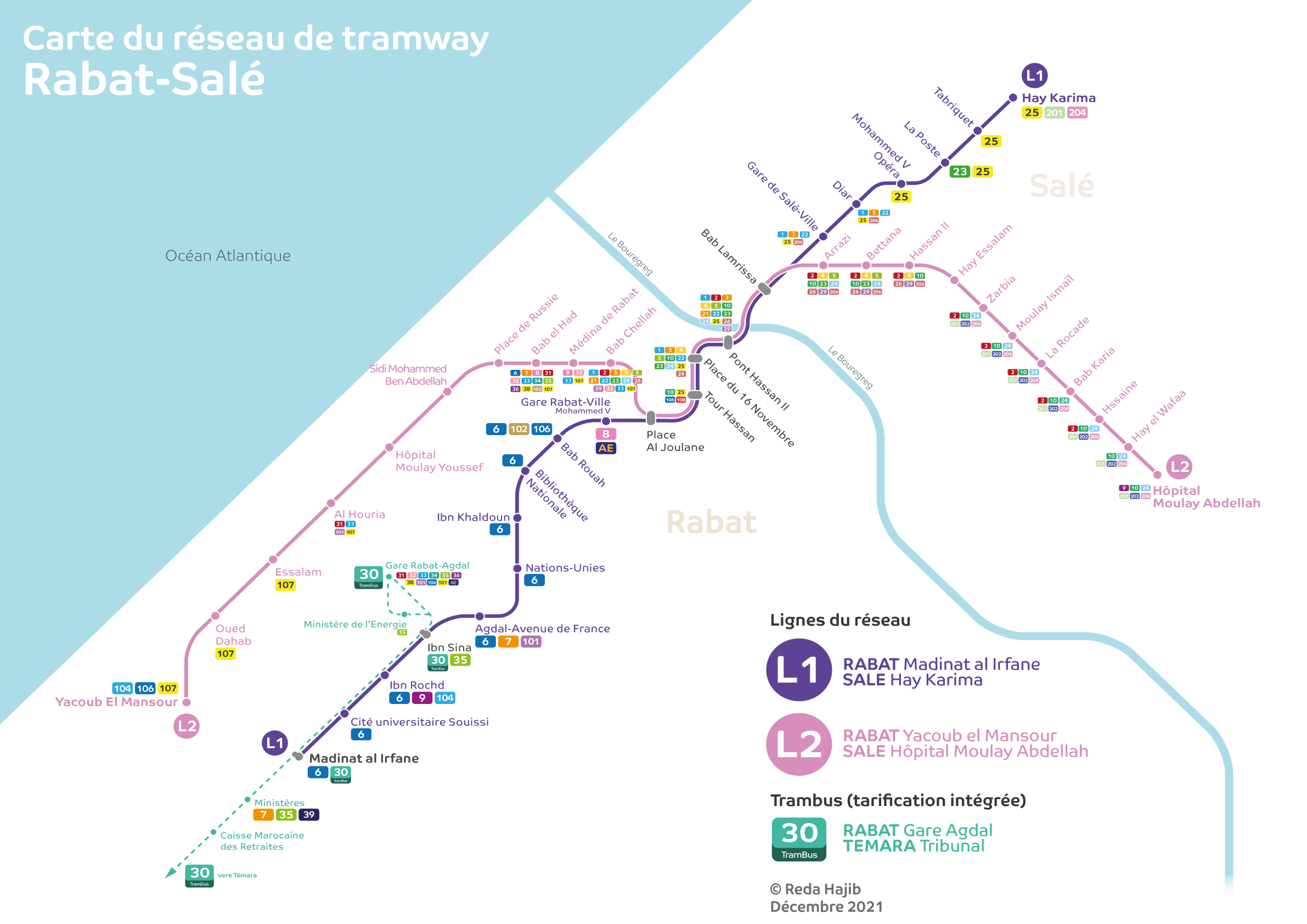

The Rabat–Salé tramway (Arabic: طرامواي الرباط - سلا, lit. 'Ṭrāmwāy ar-Ribāt - Salā') is a tram system in the Moroccan agglomeration of Rabat and Salé cities which opened on 23 May 2011.

== Network ==
The first tram network to exist in Rabat was inaugurated in 1917 and operated until 1930 when it was replaced by trolleybuses.

The modern system is 26 km (16.2 mi) long with 42 stops. It has two lines (1 and 2) with a combined section and frequency of 8 minutes in peak hours. It has a calculated ridership of 172,000 passengers per day. It is operated by Transdev with Alstom Citadis articulated modern trams consisting of two 5-piece sections. The lines use the special new Hassan II bridge over the Bou Regreg and pass near Rabat-Ville station and through the specially arranged aperture in the medieval city's wall. Expansion of existing lines and two more lines (3 and 4) were under construction, with opening scheduled for 2019 or 2020. The tramway is operated under contract by Transdev.

=== Lines ===
- L1: exists and is under extension.
- L2: exists and is under extension.

== History ==
Construction of the network began in February 2007 and its operations began on 23 May 2011. In January 2017, a seven-kilometre extension to the network was announced. The extension opened on 16 February 2022.

== Tram Mobile ==
On 11 October 2021, the Rabat-Salé Tramway Company launched its first mobile app, allowing passengers to purchase and validate tickets, as well as pay for other services such as student and public subscriptions. Tram Mobile will be scalable to include other details such as real-time information on tram arrivals, and the availability of slots in dedicated parking.

== Rolling stock ==
To commence operations, 44 Alstom Citadis trams were purchased. In 2017 it was announced that a further 22 would be delivered in 2019.

== See also ==
- Casablanca Tramway
- Rail transport in Morocco
