= Train Navette Rapide =

Moroccan rail service

Train Navette Rapide Casablanca-Kenitra
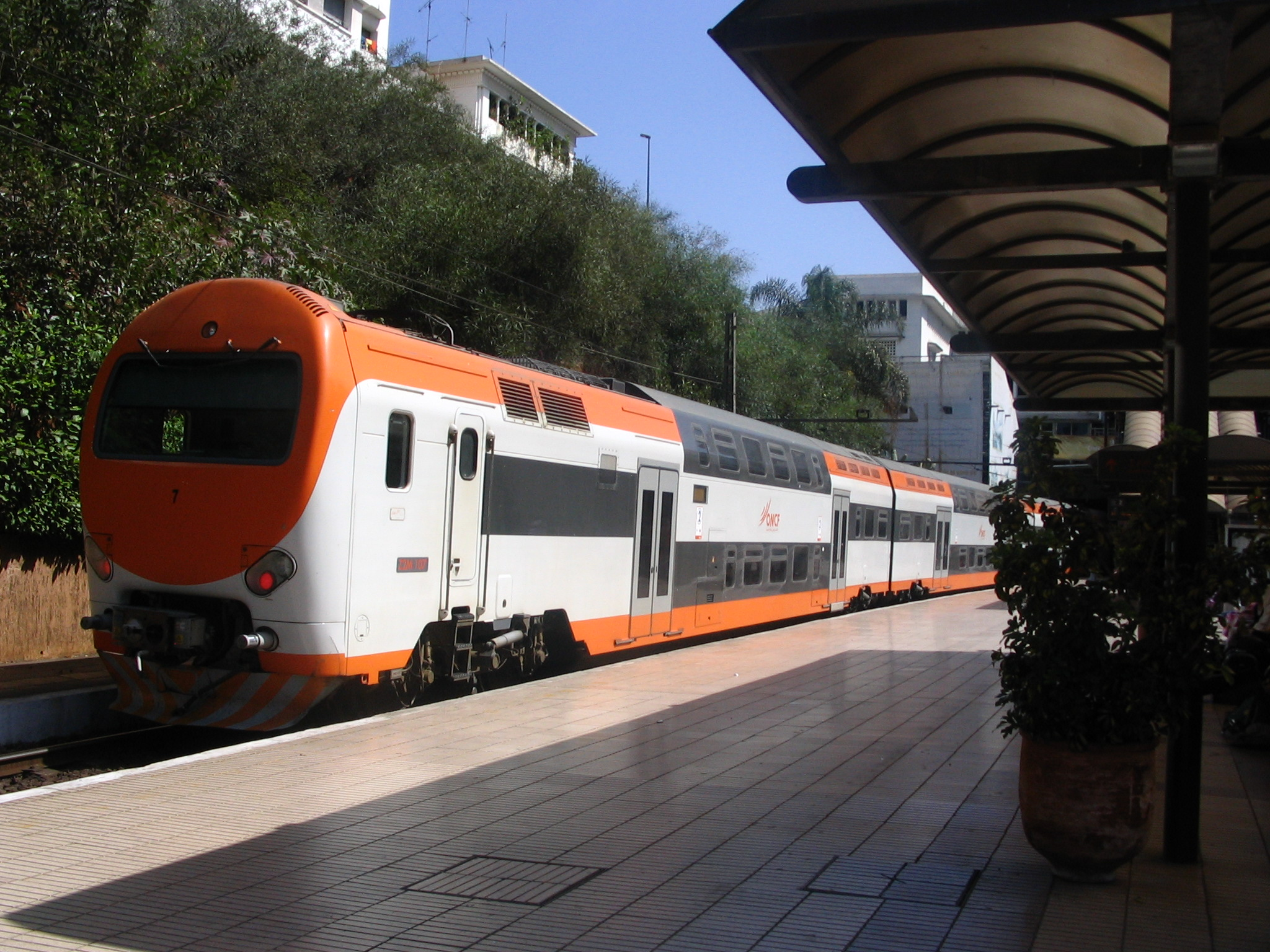
- Train at Rabat-Ville railway station

Overview
- Other name: Aouita
- Owner: Kingdom of Morocco
- Termini: Casa-Port; Kenitra-Medina

Service
- Services: TNR Casablanca-Kenitra
- Operator(s): ONCF
- Ridership: 15 million (2010)

History
- Opened: 1984

Technical
- Track gauge: 1,435 mm (4 ft 8 1/2 in) standard gauge

Train Navette Rapide ("Fast Shuttle Train", more commonly known as the "TNR" or "Aouita") is a Moroccan rail service operated by the ONCF. Its first phase runs from Casablanca to Kénitra with a half-hourly service in each direction, between 6 a.m. and 9.30 p.m. The concept was based on existing Moroccan transport links.

== TNR Casablanca - Kenitra ==
=== History ===
On 21 May 1984, following the doubling of the Casablanca—Rabat line, the TNR made its first journey on the line from Casa-Port to Rabat-Ville. It was named the "Aouita". It connected the two cities with 14 trains a day in each direction, journeys taking under an hour. The TNR service was provided by eight EMUs, each with 271 seats and air conditioning.

Spurred by its success, the ONCF added 32 centre-aisle coaches in 1992, and in 1995 added a second series of six air-conditioned EMUs.

To improve the service, more infrastructure projects were undertaken to extend the line to Salé and on to Kénitra, which was made possible by doubling the line between them (in 1992) and constructing a tunnel at Rabat Agdal (in 1996).

In 2002, the service was increased to sixty trains a day in each direction (30,000 seats/day), half-hourly during off-peak and every 15 minutes during peak hours.

In 2010, the TNR carried over 15 million passengers, half of the entire traffic, with 3 million season-ticket holders.

=== Plans ===
==== Service improvements ====
- Increase of train frequency to 15 minute intervals, and 5 minute intervals in peak hours. This will be possible with the implementation of ETCS signalling.
- Construction of the Al Boraq and tripling of tracks between Rabat and Casablanca to separate slower and high-speed trains, and to improve the speed of the TNR at the Casablanca-Kenitra hub.

==== Extension ====
An extension of the TNR service in the north-west of Kenitra is also planned, to serve the Atlantic Free Zone and the town of Sidi Yahya El Gharb.

== Expansion ==
The TNR concept has been rolled out to other lines:

- June 1993: Casablanca – Mohammed V International Airport; this route was renamed Al Bidaoui in 2002 after service upgrades.
- June 2002: Casablanca – El Jadida; service was increased in June 2007 to a departure every 2 hours in each direction.
- June 2008: Casablanca - Settat; 34 trains a day between 5 a.m. and 9 p.m.

By steadily increasing the number and frequency of trains, the TNR has become part of daily life for a new generation of commuters, the "navetteurs".

=== Route map ===
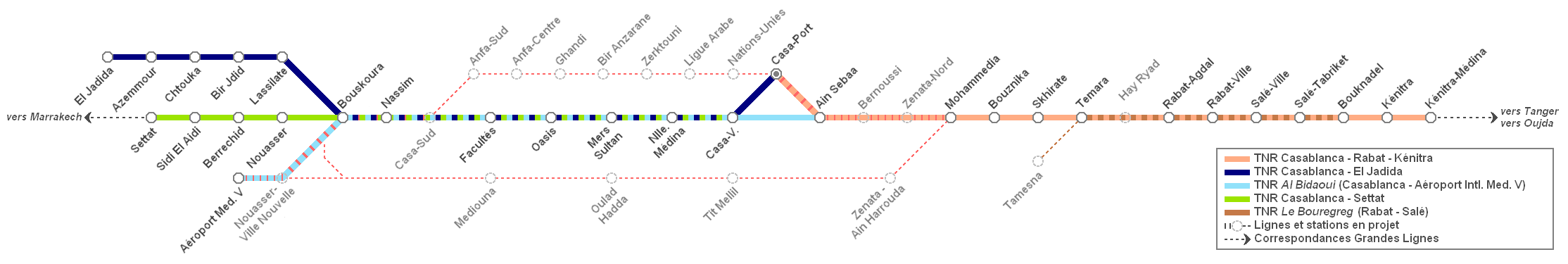

== See also ==
- Rail transport in Morocco
