= Al Bidaoui =

Rail system in Casablanca, Morocco

Al Bidaoui البيضاوي
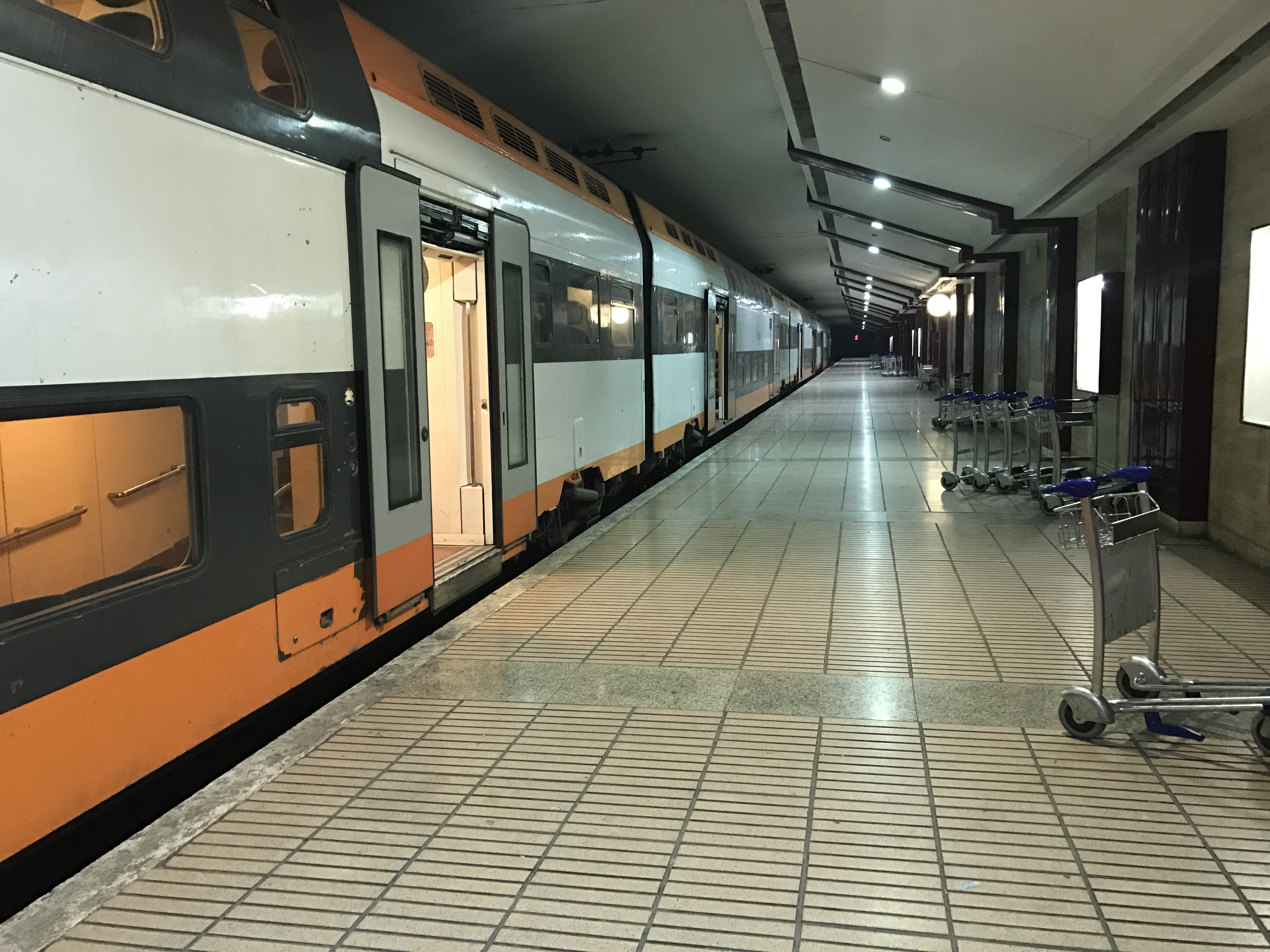

Overview
- Locale: Casablanca, Morocco
- Transit type: Rapid transit
- Number of lines: 1 (2 planned)
- Number of stations: 11

Operation
- Began operation: 2002
- Operator: ONCF

Technical
- System length: 32.0 km (19.9 mi)

Al Bidaoui (Arabic: البيضاوي) is a commuter rail system serving Casablanca in Morocco. It serves several train stations in Casablanca such as Casa-Voyageurs, Casa-Port and Mohammed V International Airport.

== History ==
After the growth in the region of Casablanca, ONCF started constructing a railway line to go through the region and created the TNR line between Casablanca and the airport in 1993. Starting from 1 July 2002, the line has been improved and called Al Bidaoui.

== Naming ==
The system was first called TNR Casablanca - Airport until 2002 when it was renamed Al Bidaoui which is an adjective in Arabic describing people and things from the region of Casablanca.

== Stations ==
Station	Commune	Connection
Mohammed V International Airport	Nouaceur
Bouskoura train station	Bouskoura
Ennassim train station	Casablanca
Faculté station	Casablanca	T1
Oasis railway station	Casablanca	T1
Mers Sultan station	Casablanca	T2
Casa-Voyageurs railway station	Casablanca	T1
Casa-Port railway station	Casablanca	TNR

== Extensions ==
There are plans to extend the line to include more station until Mohammedia to the north.

=== Future line R1 (planned for 2020) ===
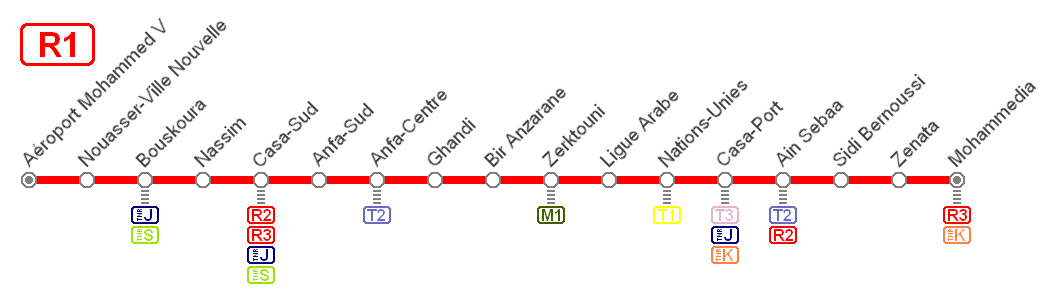
Map of the future RER line

=== Future network map of Casablanca RER (planned for 2030) ===
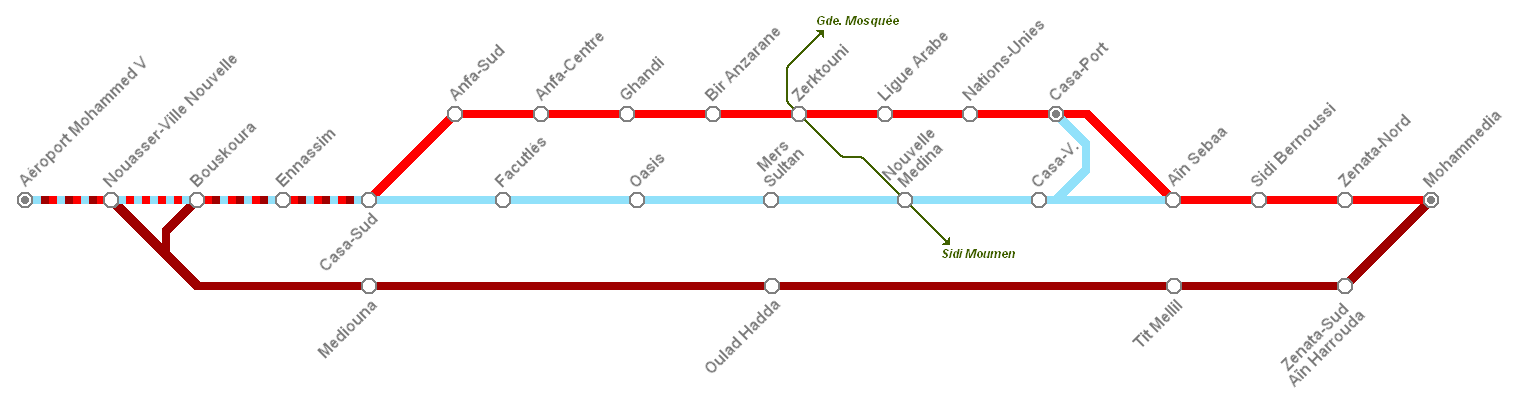
Global map of Casablanca regional rail network in 2030, as planned
