= Casablanca Tramway =

Tram system in Casablanca, Morocco

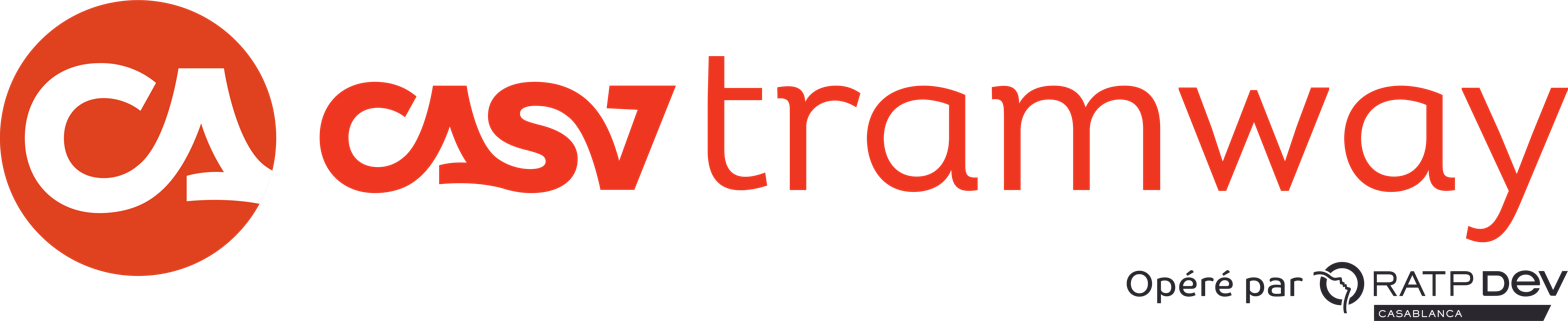

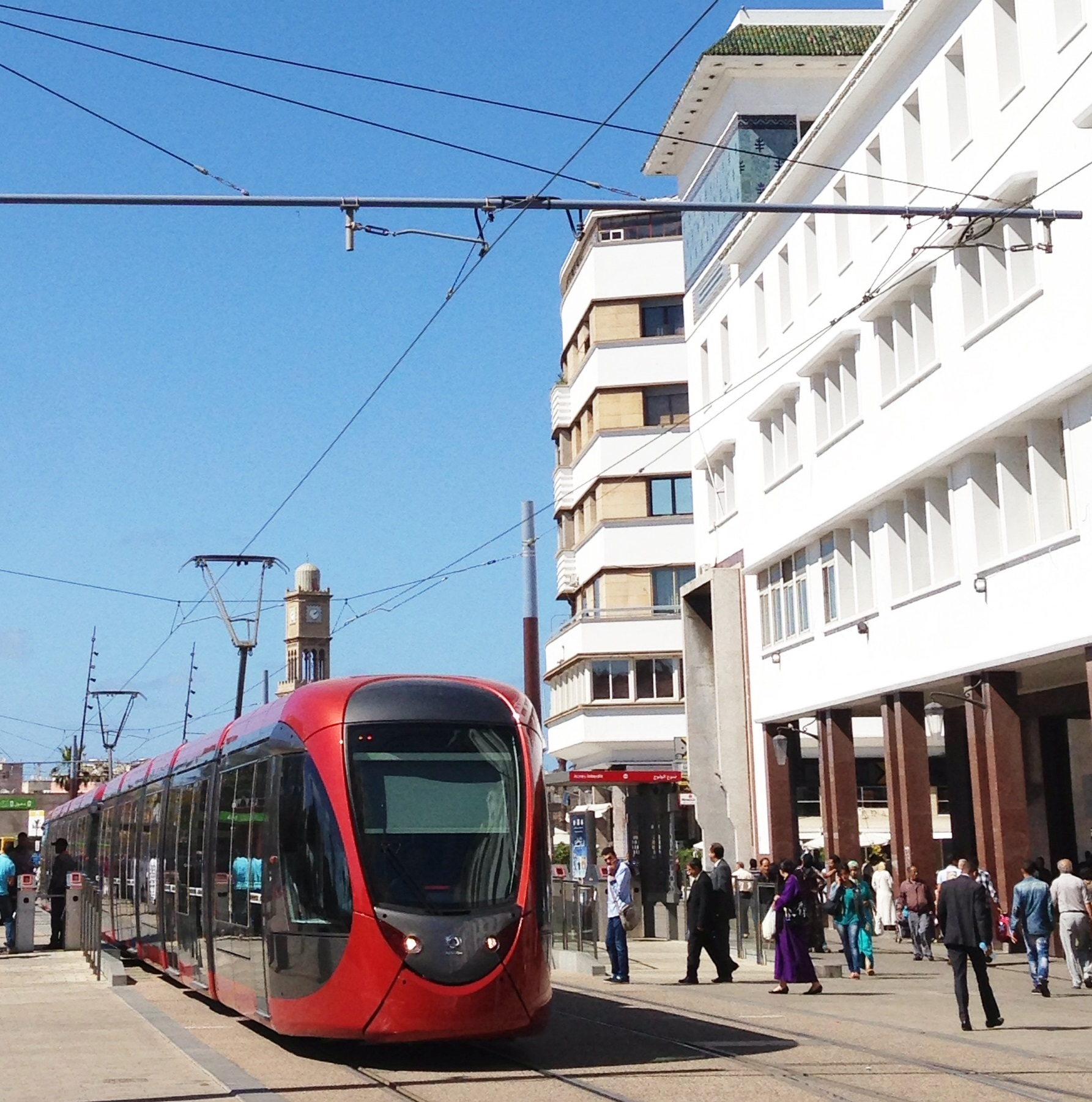
- Alstom Citadis vehicle on line T1 at Place des Nations-Unies station

Overview
- Native name: Arabic: طرامواي الدار البيضاء
- Locale: Casablanca, Morocco
- Stations: 110
- Website: http://www.casatramway.ma

Service
- Type: Tramway
- Services: 4
- Operator: RATP Dev Casablanca
- Rolling stock: 124 Alstom Citadis 302, 66 Alstom Citadis X05
- Daily ridership: 220,000 (2019)

History
- Opened: 13 December 2012

Technical
- Line length: 74 km (46 mi)
- Track gauge: 1,435 mm (4 ft 8 1/2 in) standard gauge
- Operating speed: 19 km/h (12 mph)

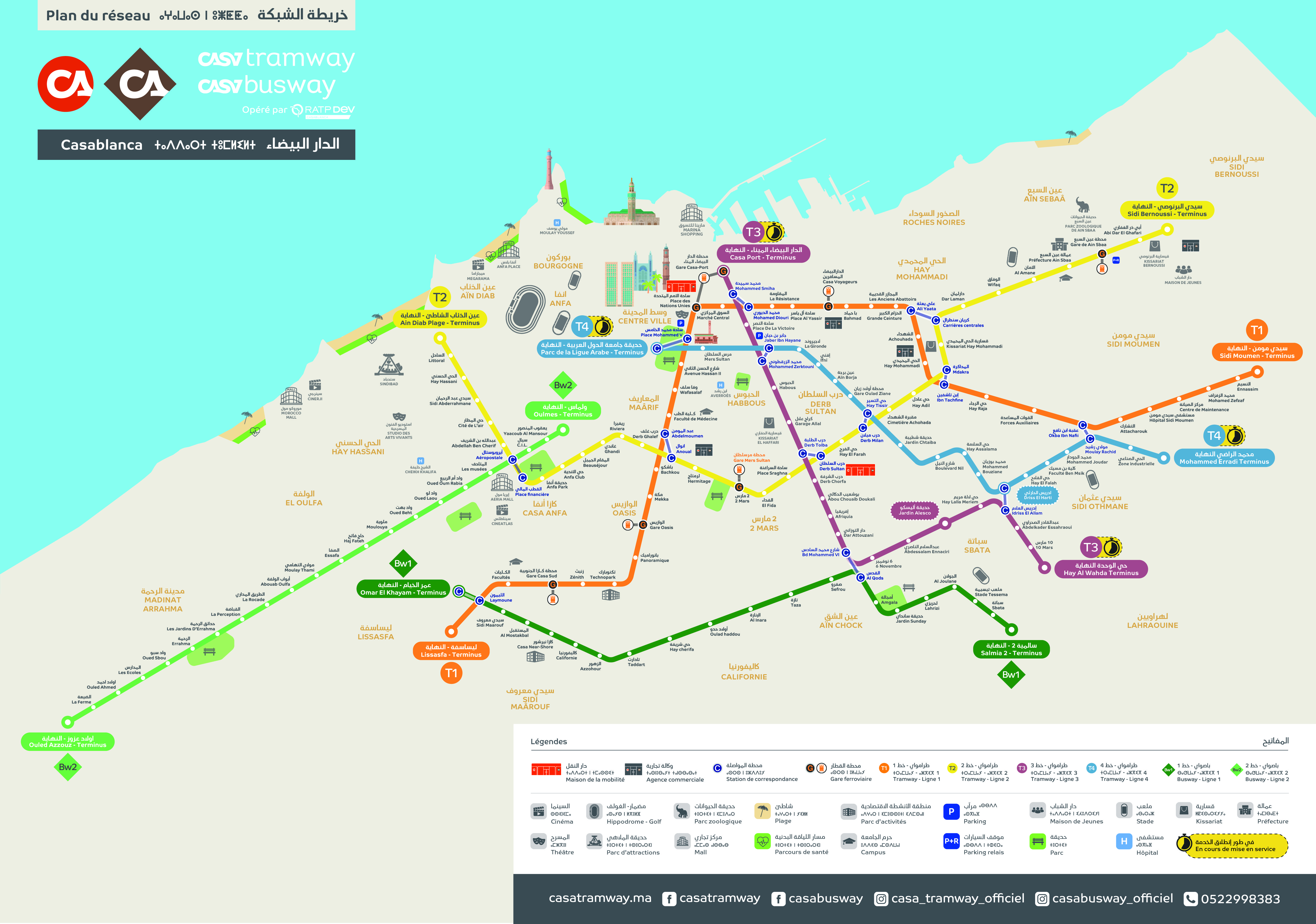

The Casablanca Tramway (Arabic: طرامواي الدار البيضاء Ṭrāmwāy ad-Dār al-Bayḍā’) is a low-floor tram system in Casablanca, Morocco. As of 2024, it consists of four lines – T1 from Sidi Moumen to Lissasfa, T2 from Sidi Bernoussi to Aïn Diab, T3 from Casa Port Station to Hay El Wahda, and T4 from Arab League Park to Mohammed Erradi—which intersect at nine points.

== History ==
The Casablanca Tramway is the second modern tram system in Morocco, after the Rabat–Salé tramway, but it is longer and has more stations.

It was first opened by King Muhammad VI on 12 December 2012. At that time, it consisted of one 31-kilometre (19 mi) Y-shaped line with 48 stops, connecting Sidi Moumen in the east with Ain Diab and the Facultés district in the west. The line forked toward Ain Diab and Facultés after Abdelmoumen Station.

A second line was opened on 24 January 2019. It connects Sidi Bernoussi to Ain Diab, using the segment of the previously existing line from the split to Ain Diab. Line 1 was also extended from Facultés to Lissasfa.

Another two lines, T3 and T4, were inaugurated on 23 September 2024.

== Construction ==
Project management on the first line was provided by Casablanca Transports en Site Aménagé ("Casa Transports"), a limited company created for the purpose in March 2009. Stakeholders were the Ministry of Finance & the Interior, local government (the Grand Casablanca regional government, the Casablanca préfecture and the Casablanca urban commune), and several institutional investors (King Hassan II, CDG Capital, Banque Populaire du Maroc, and ONCF). Casa Transports awarded the construction contract to a global group headed by the French group Systra. Project support was subcontracted to the Spanish group Ayesa Tecnología.

Preparatory work started in 2009, with the construction of the first line starting in 2010. The line was inaugurated on 12 December 2012 by King Mohammed VI, with French Prime Minister Jean-Marc Ayrault in attendance. Commercial services started the next day.

The 20 km (12 mi) of Zones 1 and 3 were constructed by Yapı Merkezi, and the 10 km (6.2 mi) of Zone 2 by Colas Rail.

== Current network ==
Line	Terminus	Opening	Length (km)	Stations
	Lissasfa to Sidi Moumen	2012	23,5	38
	Aïn Diab Plage to Sidi Bernoussi	2019	22,5	33
	Gare de Casa-Port to Hay El Wahda	2024	14	20
	Parc de la Ligue Arabe to Mohammed Erradi	2024	12,5	19
TOTAL			72,5	110

=== Line T1 ===
As of 2025, Casablanca Tramway Line 1 serves 36 stations between termini in Sidi Moumen and Lissasfa. The line is 23.5 km (14.6 mi) long and takes 73 minutes from one end to the other. It opened in December 2012 and was extended in January 2019.

=== Line T2 ===
As of 2025, the 17 km (11 mi) Line T2 runs from Ain Diab to Sidi Bernoussi, via the Ain Sebaa, Hay Hassani, Al Fida and Derb Sultan districts. It uses the segment from the split to Ain Diab in the previous configuration, in addition to the new line.

=== Line T3 ===
As of 2025, Casablanca Tramway Line 3 serves 20 stations between termini in Hay Al Wahda and Casa-Port railway station. The line is 14 km (8.7 mi) long and has a frequency of 5–10 minutes.

=== Line T4 ===
As of 2025, Casablanca Tramway Line 4 serves 19 stations between termini in Mohammed Erradi Avenue and Arab League Park. The line is 12.5 km (7.8 mi) long and an extension to Hassan II Mosque through Moulay Youssef Boulevard is in study.

=== Operations ===
Travel time between termini is around 69 minutes from Facultés and 77 minutes from Hay Hassani. With a 75% priority at junctions, the average speed comes close to 19 kilometres per hour (12 mph). On weekdays, the tramway runs from 06:30 to 22:00 and at weekends it runs from 06:30 to 23:30. Service averages were planned to be every 4 1/2 minutes in peak hours and 8 1/2 minutes off-peak.

Casa Transport awarded a five-year contract to operate the tramway to the CasaTram consortium of RATP Group, Caisse de dépôt et de gestion and Transinvest as partners. In January 2016 RATP Group became the sole shareholder.

Following a competitive tender process, RATP Group was awarded a further contract until December 2029 having beaten bids from a National Express / ALSA / ONCF consortium and Transdev.

Engie Ineo and Engie Cofely Morocco supplied signaling and other systems for Line 2 as well as an extension of Line 1.

=== Station Layouts ===
The first type of station track layouts is the most common with two tracks and a side platform for each one (but with a joint single track at the end since the station is a terminus).

=== Rolling stock ===
When the tramway first opened it was operated by 74 Alstom Citadis type 302 low-floor trams, built by Alstom in France. The final assembly was completed in Reichshoffen, Alsace. Trams have air conditioning and tinted windows, and an information system in both Arabic and French. They run typically in pairs with a total length of 65 metres (213 ft). A further 50 trams were ordrered in 2015 to operate Line T2.

In July 2017, Alstom, Bombardier / CAF, CRRC Zhuzhou Locomotive and Škoda Transportation were shortlisted to bid for a contract for 100 trams for Lines T3 and T4. The contract was awarded to Alstom and 66 Citadis X05s were delivered, which run in coupled pairs capable of carrying up to 630 passengers.

=== Fares ===
Ticket prices are subsidised by the Moroccan government and the city of Casablanca, and set at a flat rate of 8 dirhams per journey, with a weekly season ticket at 60 dirhams and a monthly season ticket at 230 dirhams. Fares are paid by a paper smart card at turnstiles on each station platform. Students get a reduced monthly season ticket of 150 dirhams. A combined tram and bus fare is being considered.

=== Usage ===
In the first month of service, between 40,000 and 45,000 passengers used the service each day, on average. A survey in June 2013 recorded 70,000 commuters. By 2013, the tramway had met its objectives by carrying over 100,000 passengers a day. From 2015, 255,000 passengers a day are expected on Line T1.

=== Incidents ===
Tramway operations have resulted in many accidents: in the first 13 months, 180 accidents were reported.

- On 1 April 2013, a lorry hit a tramcar at full speed. Both the lorry and tram drivers were injured, according to a witness. The impact was so hard that part of the tram was derailed.
- On 2 August 2013, a man was crushed to death.
- Two days later on 4 August 2013, a motorcyclist was hit by a tram and died.
- On 14 January 2014, a man died after being hit by a tram.
- On 24 April 2014, a 26-year-old woman was fatally injured by the tram.
- On 4 July 2014, a coach owned by a private firm failed to give way to the tram and struck it. Part of the tram was derailed.
- On 13 January 2015, a rider who entered the tram platform died after being hit.
- On 8 November 2017, two teenagers on a motorcycle were injured after hitting a tram line.
- On 26 December 2017, two women were struck crossing the tramway and were injured.

== Future ==
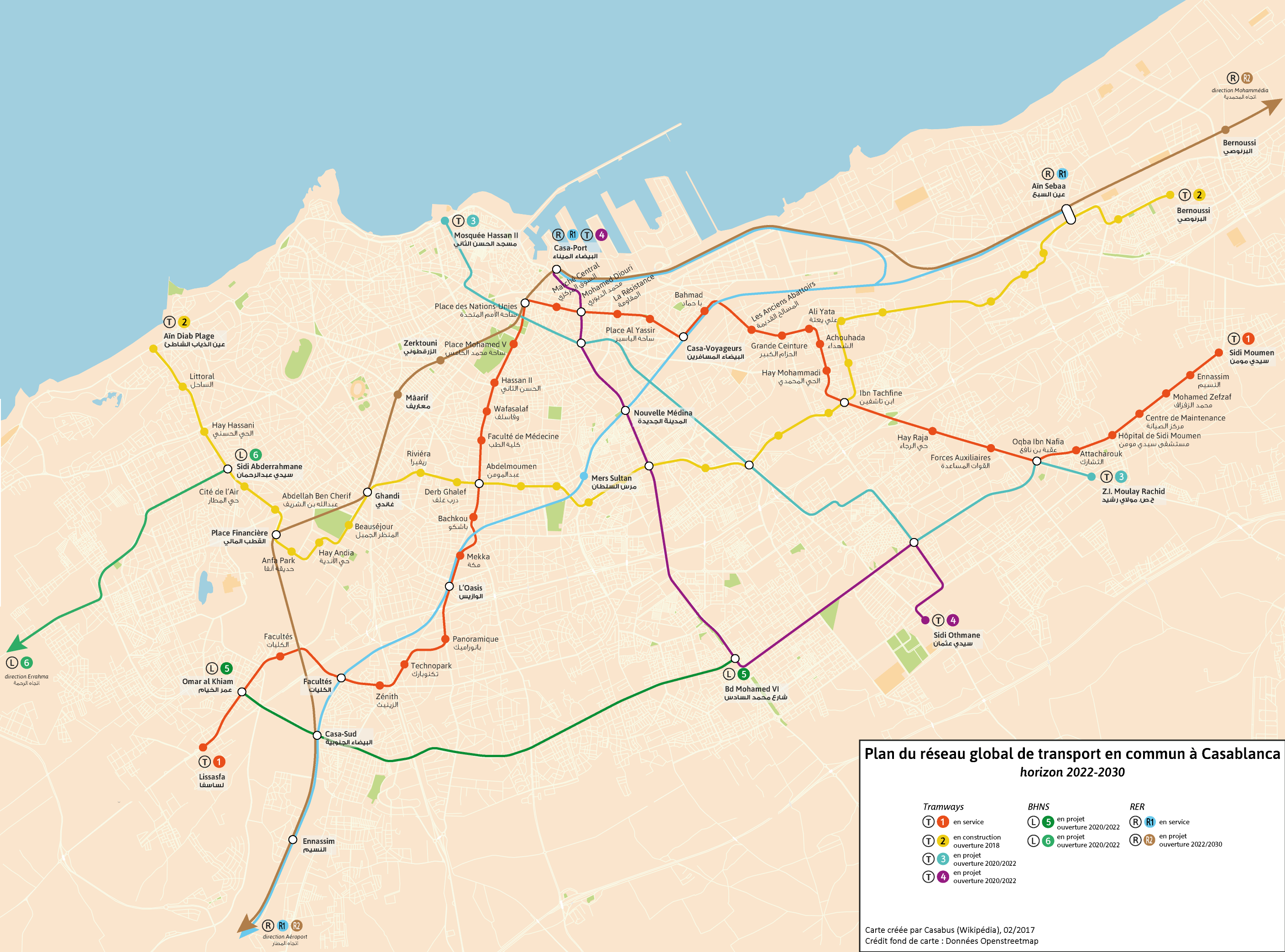
Projected plan of the Casablanca Tramway network in conjunction with commuter rail and rapid transit buses for the period 2022–2030 (presented February 2017).

The Schéma directeur d'aménagement urbain (SDAU, "Master plan of the Director of urban planning") and the Plan de déplacement urbain (PDU, "Urban transport plan") for Greater Casablanca foresee a final network of 4 tramway lines, two traversal (T1, T2) and two radial (T3, T4). These lines will interchange with the now cancelled Casablanca Metro and the operational Al Bidaoui suburban railways. Casablanca will have a network totalling 76 route km (47 1/4 route mi), costing 5.9 billion dirhams.

== See also ==
- Casablanca Busway
- Rabat–Salé tramway
- Rail transport in Morocco
