= Casa-Port Railway Terminal =

Railway station in Morocco

Casa-Port
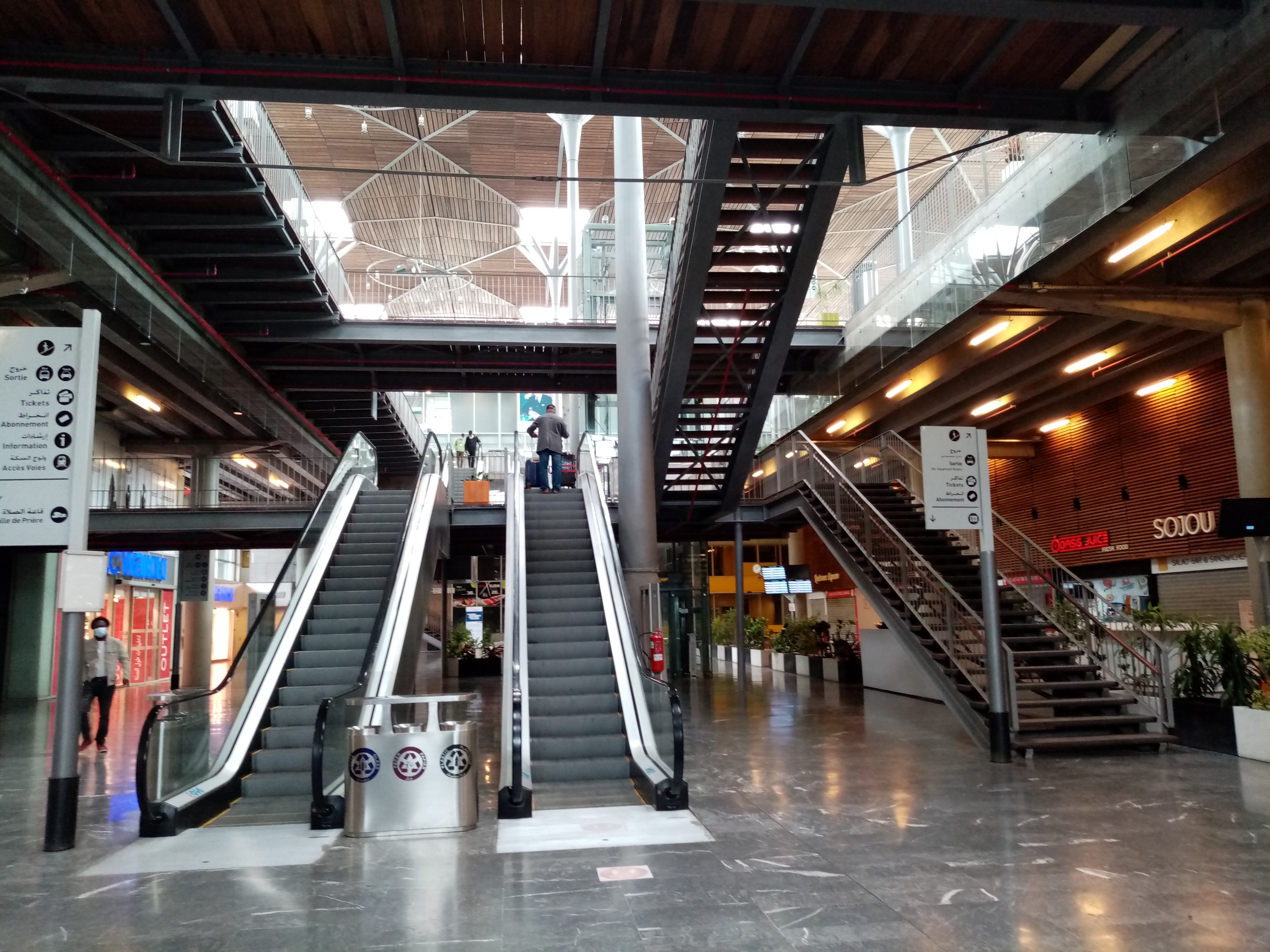
- The new passenger hall in November 2014

General information
- Location: Casablanca; Morocco
- Coordinates: 33°35′57″N 7°36′43″W
- Owner: Kingdom of Morocco
- Operator: ONCF
- Platforms: 4
- Tracks: 6
- Connections: Casablanca Tramway Line T1

History
- Opened: 1907

Services
Preceding station		Following station
Terminus	Train Navette Rapide	Ain Sabaâ towards Kenitra-Medina
Casa-Voyageurs towards Mohammed V Airport	Al Bidaoui	Terminus
Location

Casa-Port Railway Terminal (Arabic: محطة الدار البيضاء الميناء, French: Gare de Casa-Port) is an ONCF (Office National des Chemins de Fer du Maroc, "Moroccan National Railway") station in the centre of Casablanca, near the Port of Casablanca. It is served by suburban, regional and long-distance trains and is one of the major Casablanca stations, together with Casa-Voyageurs.

== Layout ==
The station is a terminus, with 6 tracks and 4 platforms. Most notably, it is served by the Train Navette Rapide (TNR) from Casablanca to Kénitra via Rabat.

== Renovation ==
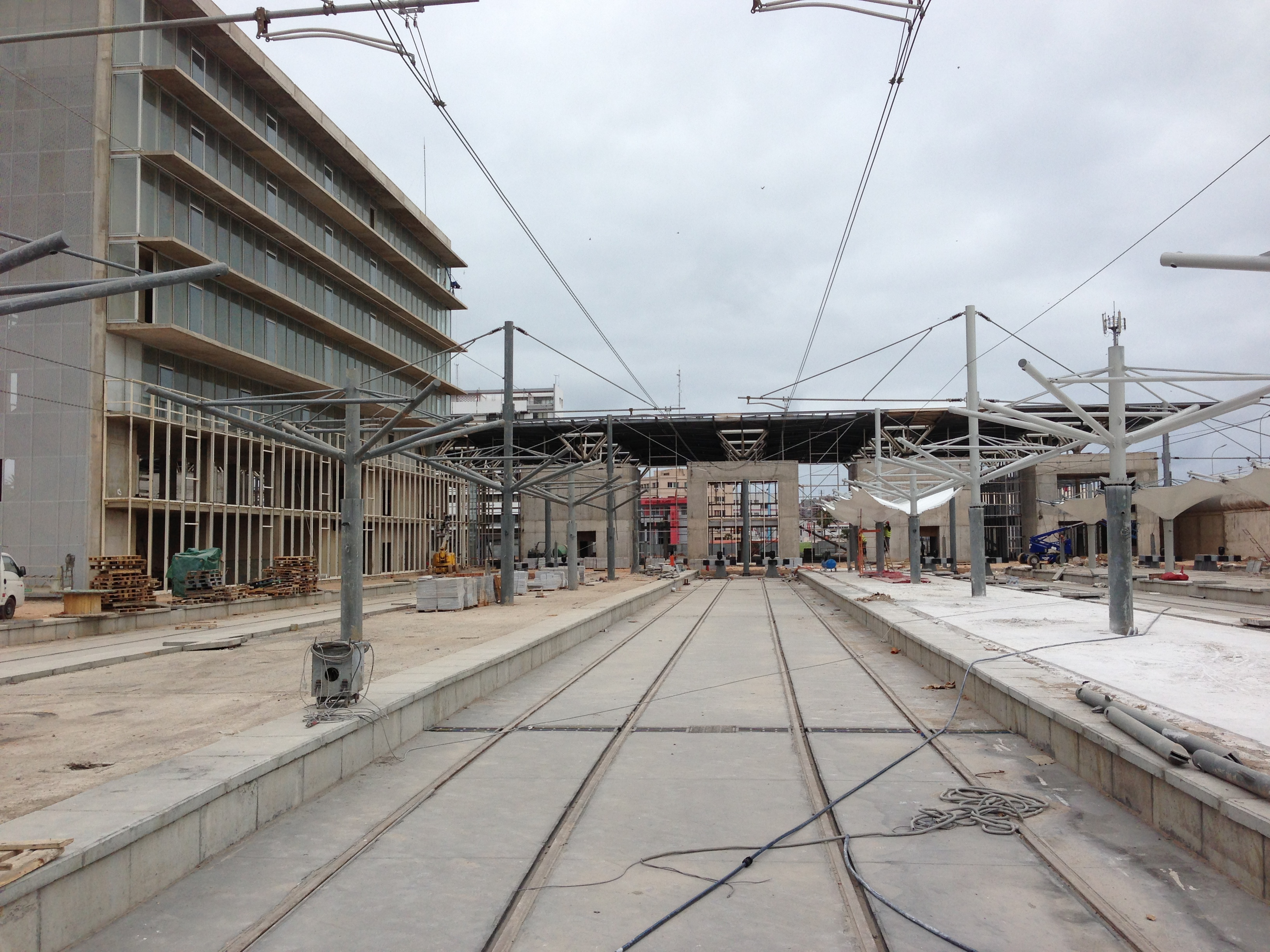
Renovation work in progress, June 2013

The terminal went through a renovation from 2008 to September 2014. The project included modernizing the rail infrastructure and platforms, as well as building a new passenger area, shops, and a 500-place underground car park, in addition to 27,000 square metres (290,000 sq ft) of office space. ONCF's total investment is around 100 million MAD.

During the renovation, access to the platforms was via a temporary passenger building on the Boulevard Moulay Abderrahmane. Boarding and alighting points were moved to allow train movements without interruption to other traffic.

After the works are complete, the station will comprise 8 tracks with 5 platforms and have a capacity of 20 trains per hour (t.p.h.), handling 10,000 passengers a day.

The reconstruction works had several setbacks. The initial plan for the works, managed by the ONCF with AREP/Groupe 3A as contractors, was for them to end in 2012, then in 2013. The trickiest part of the construction was new underground levels in unstable soil, close to the sea – in 2010 the whole site was flooded – and the contractor's failure, which meant re-tendering to a wider market of larger contractors. Despite multiple delays in the construction project, the brand new railway station was inaugurated on 25 September 2014 in the presence of King Mohammed VI.

== Local transport ==
The station is accessible by taxi. A station on Casablanca Tramway Line 1 is about 900 metres (980 yd) away, in the Place des Nations Unies, and the terminus of Line 3 is located a few meters away from its gate.
