= Casa-Voyageurs Railway Station =

Railway station in Casablanca, Morocco

Casa-Voyageurs محطة الدار البيضاء المسافرين
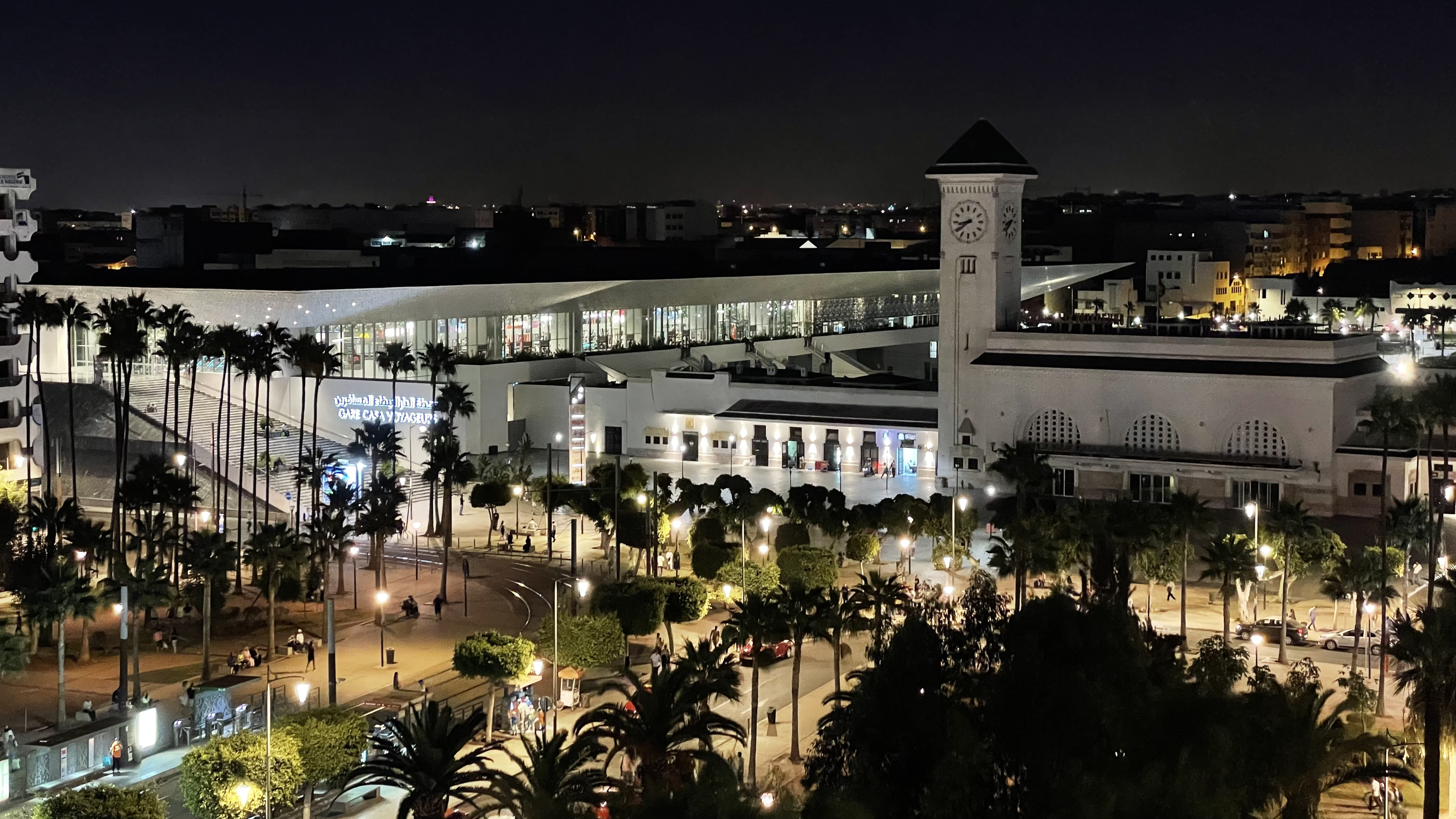
- Casa-Voyageurs with the 2018 expansion on the left and the 1923 building on the right

General information
- Location: Casablanca; Morocco
- Coordinates: 33°35′22.4″N 7°35′27″W
- Owner: Kingdom of Morocco
- Operator: ONCF
- Platforms: 8
- Connections: Casablanca Tramway

History
- Opened: 1923

Services
Preceding station		Following station
Rabat towards Tanger-Ville Terminal	Al-Boraq	Terminus
Mers Sultan towards Mohammed V Airport	Al Bidaoui	Casa-Port Terminal Terminus
Location

The Casa-Voyageurs Railway Station (Arabic: محطة الدار البيضاء المسافرين; French: Gare Casa-Voyageurs) is an ONCF (French: Office national des chemins de fer, "Moroccan National Railway") station in the Belvedere neighborhood of Casablanca.

The station is served by suburban and long-distance trains. It is Casablanca's principal station, the other is Casa-Port. It is an important hub connecting several main lines of the Moroccan railway network.

The other station in the city is Casa-Port, but that is not on the main North-South line and offers only local connections to nearby destinations and the Mohammed V International Airport.

== History ==
The station was built by the Compagnie des chemins de fer du Maroc (CFM) in 1923, under the French protectorate of Morocco. It had 8 platforms.

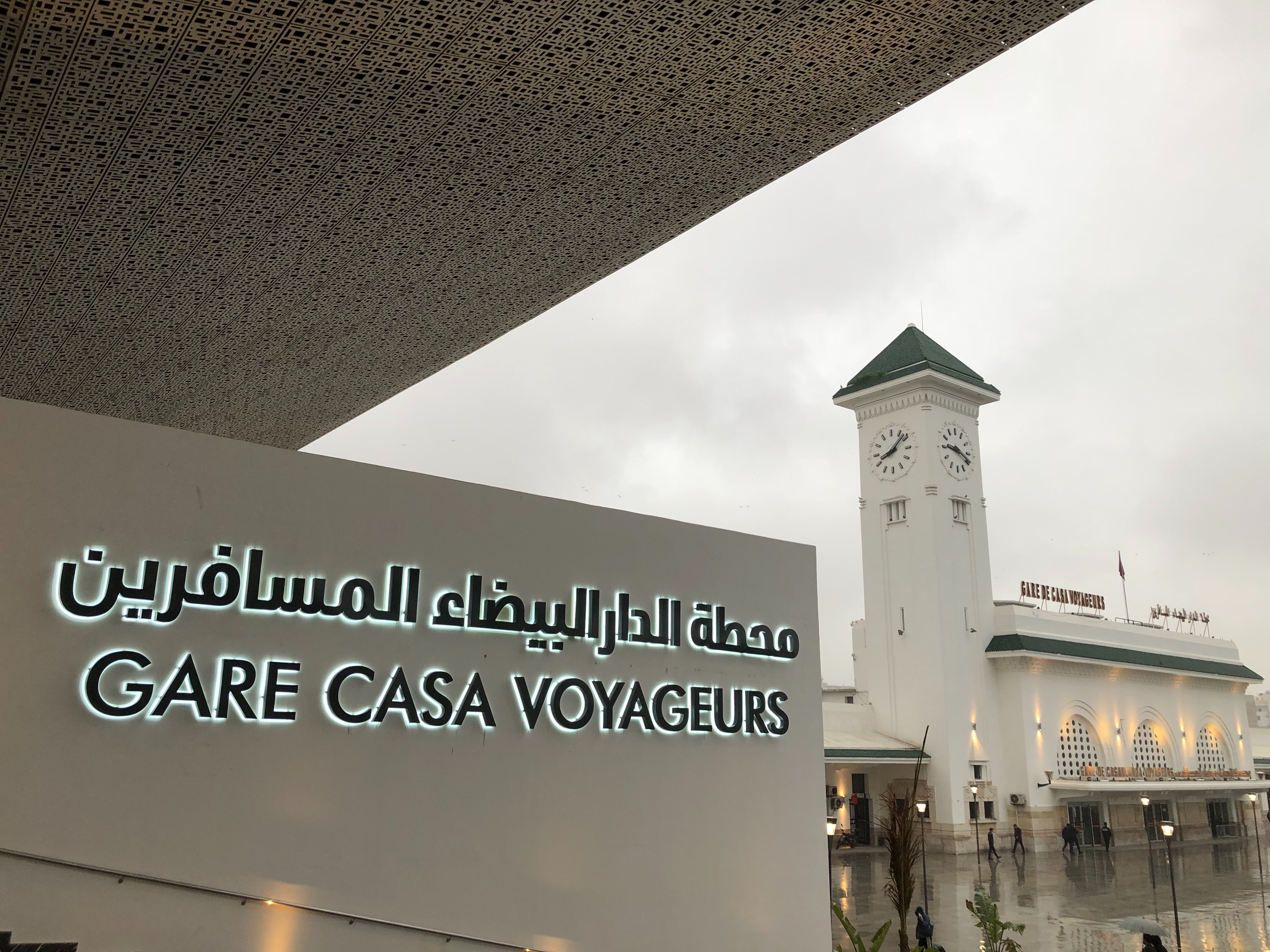
View of the station after the completion of the expansion in 2018

It was expanded for Al Boraq service which began November 2018. Casa-Voyageurs became the southern terminus for the high speed train.

It is the largest railway hub in the country, serving direct trains within Morocco (Aïn Sebaâ, Fez, Khouribga, Marrakesh, Rabat, Tangier) and Casablanca's Mohammed V International Airport.

== Destinations ==
From Casa Voyageurs direct services are available to and from:

- Marrakesh in Southern direction
- North via Rabat towards Tangier
- East via Rabat, Meknes, Fez, Taourirt to Oujda or Nador
- shuttles to Mohammed V International Airport
- local trains, including at Casa-Port

== Local transport ==
The station connects with Casablanca Tramway Line T1, the tram stop is in front of the station. It is served by M'dina Buses and by taxis.
