= Lalla Chahba Mosque =

Mosque in Salé, Morocco

Coordinates: 34°02′10″N 6°49′18″W

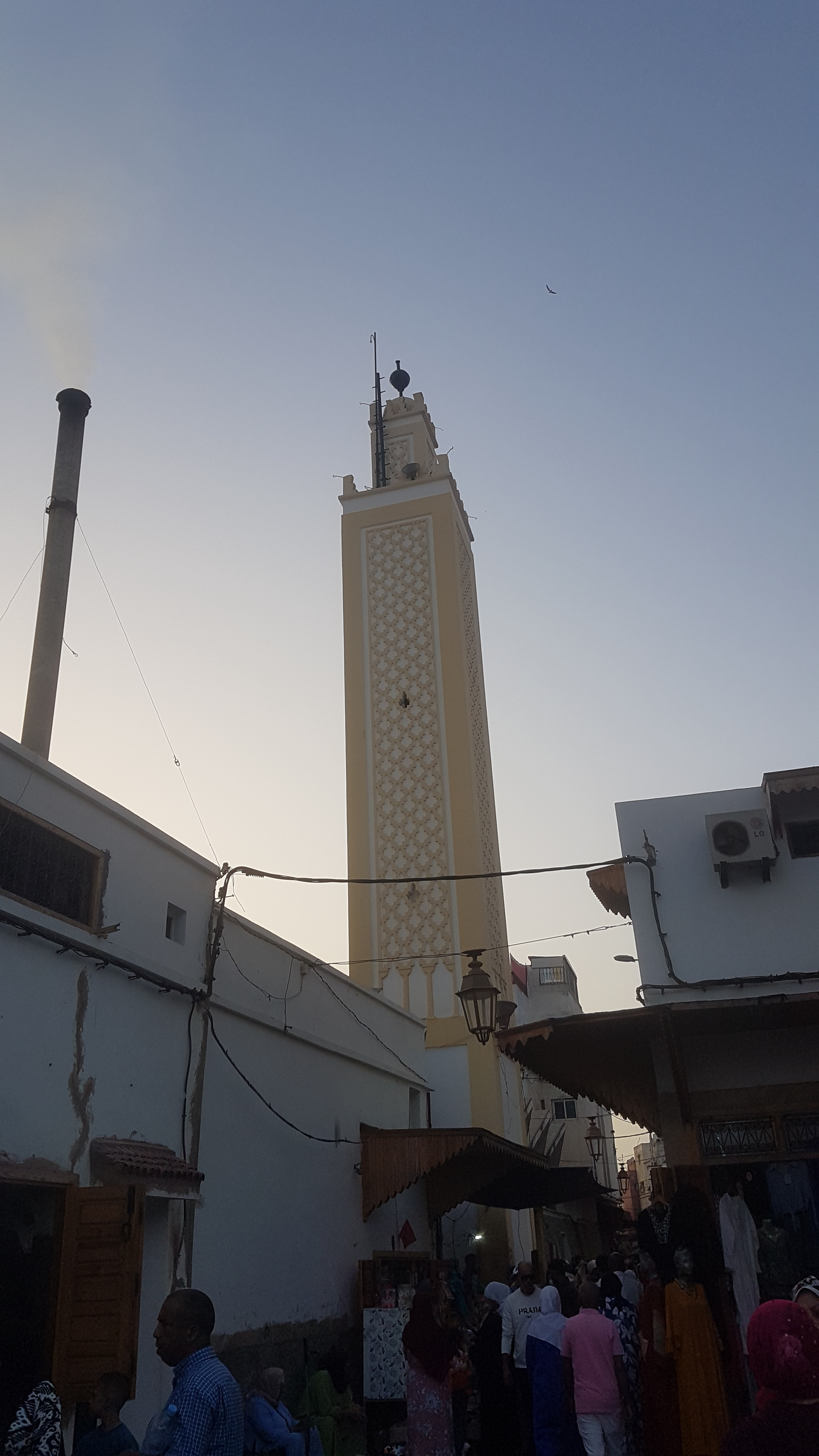
The minaret of the mosque, as seen from the northeast

Lalla Chahba Mosque (Arabic: مسجد لالة الشهباء), is a historic mosque in the medina of Salé, Morocco. Some consider it to be the second oldest mosque in the city after the Great Mosque, claiming that it was founded in 1075 CE (465 AH) during the reign of the Almoravid emir Yusuf ibn Tashfin. Some consider it to be the oldest mosque in the city, meaning it predates the Great Mosque.

The mosque deteriorated in the centuries following its construction and was buried under soil and debris. Its remains were uncovered and restored in the early 20th century. A new mosque was built over it in the 1960s.

== Origin of the name ==
There are two different narratives about the mosque's name. The first suggests that a fair-skinned (blonde) woman, known as Chahbaa, used to teach women the essentials of religion at the mosque. The second narrative states that the mosque was named "Chahbaa" because its columns, which support its arches and vaults, were grayish in color, made of solid stone resembling yellow marble. Some of these stone columns are still present in the mosque today.

== See also ==
- List of mosques in Morocco
