= Nores =

Nores may refer to:

- Nores (musician) (born 1979), Moroccan rapper and music producer
- Nores (surname), a surname of Spanish origin
