= Zniber =

Zniber is a surname. Notable people with the surname include:

- Brahim Zniber (1920–2016), Moroccan businessman
- Hajj Ali Zniber (1844–1914), Moroccan nationalist writer
- Mohammed Zniber (1923–1993), Moroccan writer and historian
- Sam Zniber (born 1969), French radio executive
