= Ahmed Maaninou =

Moroccan journalist and writer

- أحمد معنينو
- Born: c. 1906; Salé, Morocco
- Died: May 11, 2003 (aged 96–97)
- Occupations: Historian political activist
- Known for: Political Activism

Ahmed Maaninou (in Arabic: أحمد معنينو) (1906 in Salé – 11 May 2003) was a Moroccan historian, writer and political activist against the French Protectorate in Morocco.

== His life ==
Ahmed Maaninou was born in 1906 in the old town of Salé in Morocco. After starting studies in his hometown, he went to Damascus in Syria where he pursued Islamic studies, which he finalized in Beyrouth.

During the 1930s, Maaninou came back to Salé and started to engage against the French Protectorate in Morocco. He maintained a close communication with Said Hajji, the founder of Moroccan nationalist press, and they shared several letter with each other.

In 1934, he led a protest to close 20 bars built by the French in Salé, and was arrested and jailed for 2 months. In 1936, he led a protest for freedom of press, and was arrested again and imprisoned for 6 months. In 1937, he was banned from living in Salé, and went to a number of Arabic countries, before settling down in Tangier in 1941.

In 1946, his ban was lifted and he returned to Salé, and started his activism as one of the leaders for the Democratic Independence Party that was launched the same year.

== Books ==
Haj Ahmed Maaninou wrote several books related to history, politics, music, and his hometown Salé. Among his books one can find:

- The Nationalist Movement and the city of Salé – الحركة الوطنية ومدينة سلا
- Biographies of Religion and Science and Jihad Men – تراجم لرجال الدين والعلم والجهاد والوطنية
- The Malhun Music – الموزون والملحون
- The secret prison of Dar Bricha – درا بريشة أو قصة مختطف
