= Bab el-Mrissa =

Moroccan cultural heritage site

Coordinates: 34°01′59″N 6°49′13″W

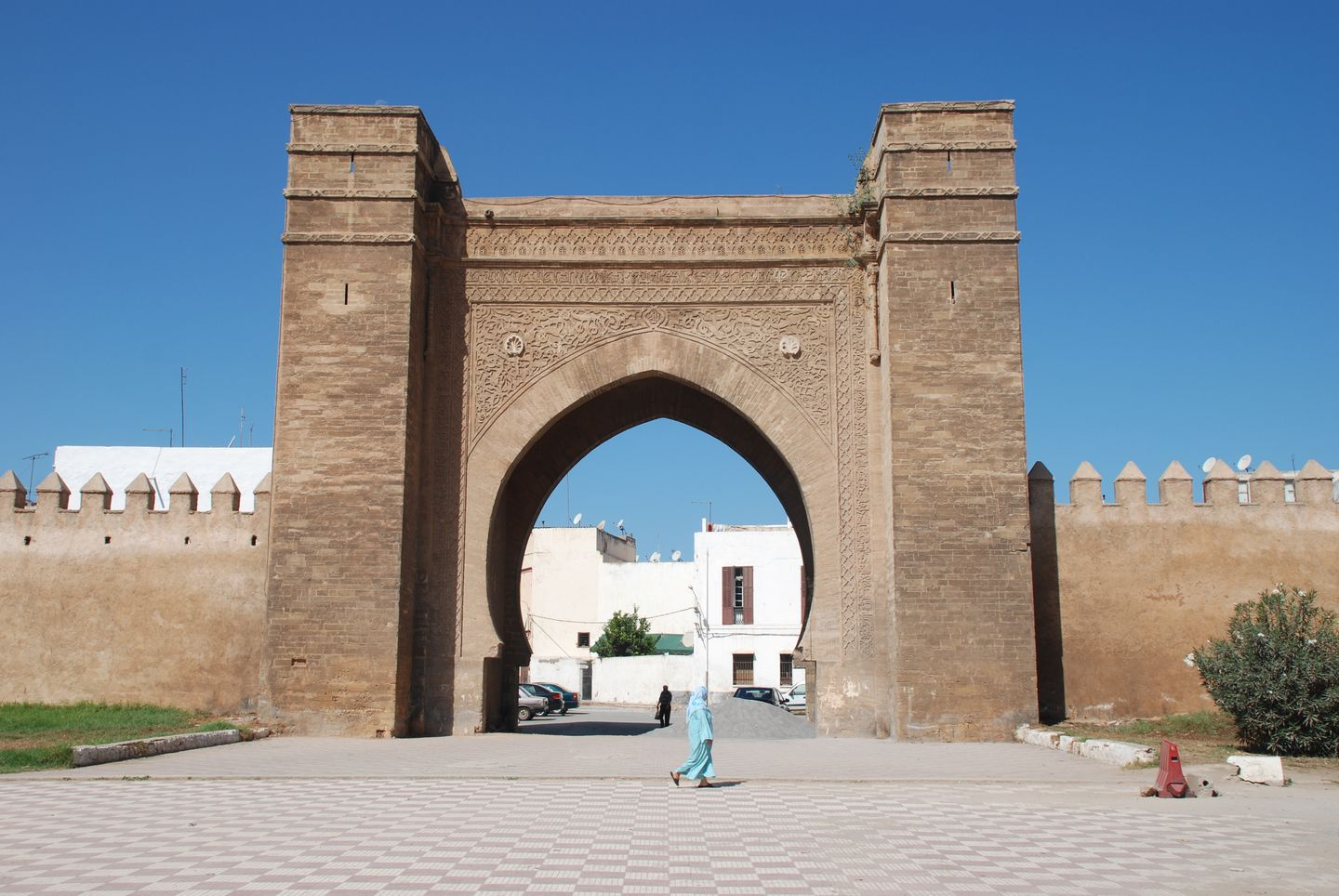
Bab el-Mrissa

Bab el-Mrissa (Arabic: باب المريسة), also known as Bab al-Mellah (Arabic: باب الملاح), is a gate in the city of Salé, Morocco. The gate was commissioned by the Marinid sultan Abu Yusuf Yaqub ibn Abd Al-Haqq between 1270—1280. It is one of the largest as well as the oldest gates in Morocco, and the main landmarks of the city.

== Description ==
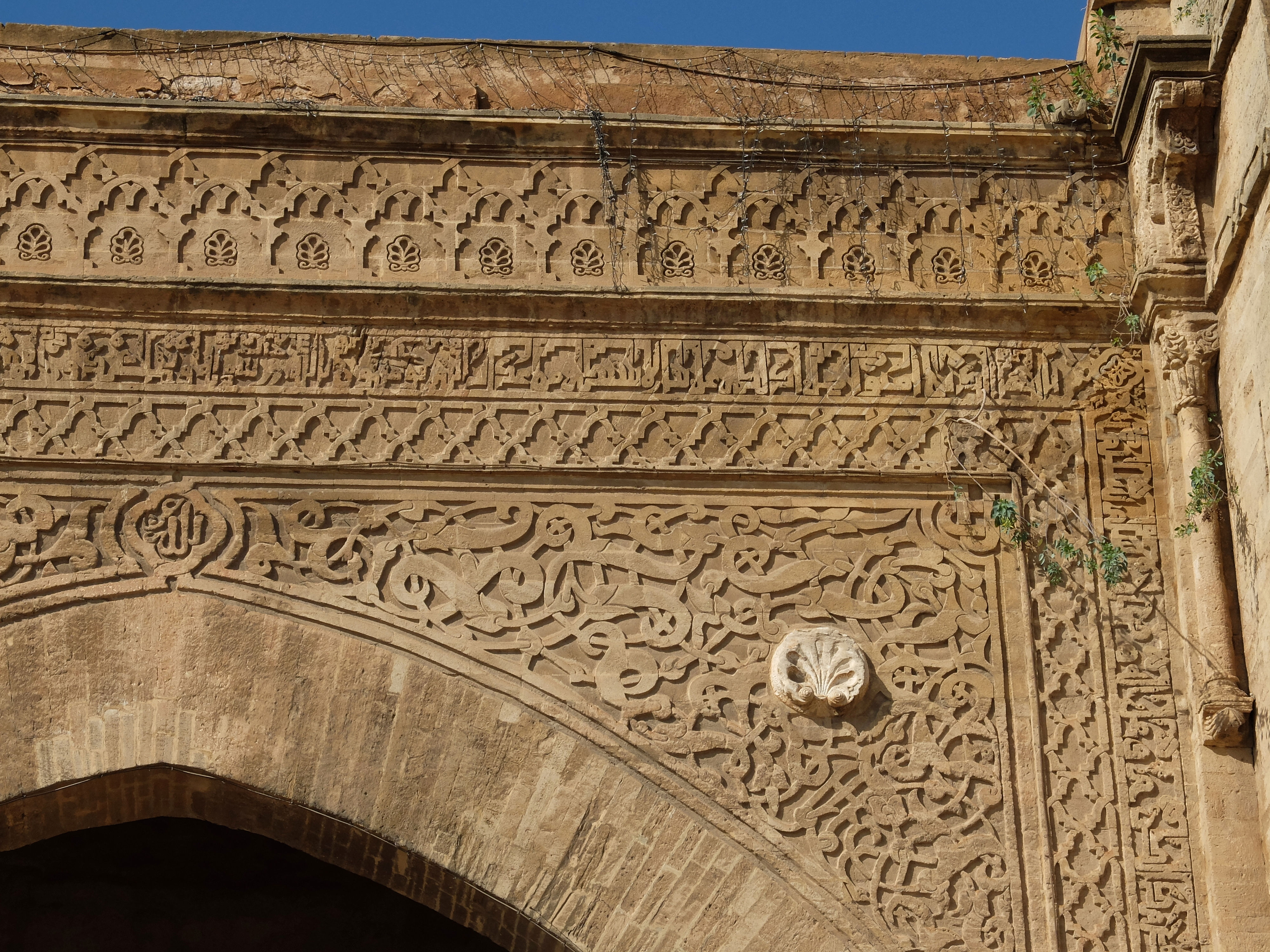
Carved decoration on the gate

The gate was a construction after the Marinid dynasty had regained the control of the city of Salé from the Kingdom of Castile during the Battle of Salé. In the process, they created a hole on the western city wall in order to allow access to the city square. Later, a shipyard was created to place the warships, and the entrance was established as Bab el-Mrissa. According to the account of Al-Nasiri, the gate existed on the protected harbor of the city, which was used by the Marinid as a shipyard. The harbor connects the city to Bou Regreg via canal, and ships entered the harbor from the canal by passing through the arch of the gate.

The gate is also known as a place where the sultan Abu Yusuf Yaqub dispatched his naval fleet to attack the city of Algeciras several times in 1285, in which joined by around 36 warships. The name "Mrissa" means muddiness, and this is because Bou Regreg and linked canal contained a lot of sands from the surrounding land, and the ships brought muddy water which disseminated in front of the gate when they were docking. Today, the scene is no longer observable due to the canal was depleted after the construction of roads connecting Rabat and Salé, as a solution to mitigate the relatively long distance and inconvenience of the canal.

The designer of the gate is Muhammad bin Ali al-Ashbili, a well known Andalusian architect. The arch takes a horseshoe shape, and the peak reaches 9.60 meters high and the width has 3.50 meters long. Inside of the gate has pathways for soldiers guarding the gate.
