= Battle of Salé =

Attack on the Moroccan city by King Alfonso

- Salé (Morocco)
Date	10 – 23 September 1260 (2 – 15 Shawwal 658 AH)
Location	Salé, Morocco
Result	Marinid victory

Belligerents
Marinid dynasty	Kingdom of Castile

Commanders and leaders
Abu Yusuf Yaqub ibn Abd Al-Haqq	Ruy López de Mendoza

Units involved
Unknown	37 battleships Unknown number of soldiers

Casualties and losses
Several killed; 3,000 captured and taken as slaves in Seville; Several parts of the city burned	Heavy losses to the soldiers^{[a]}

The Battle of Salé was a raid of the Moroccan city of Salé by King Alfonso X of Castile in 1260, when the city was governed by the Marinid dynasty. The city remained under Castilian occupation for two weeks, during which they captured 3,000 residents and took them as slaves. However, the Marinid dynasty regained control of the city after Sultan Yacoub ben Abdelhaq ordered his troops to march to the city gates.

== Background ==
According to historian Ibn Khaldun, when the Marinid dynasty took control over Salé from the Almohad Caliphate, Yacoub ben Abdellah Marinid rebelled against his uncle Abu Yusuf Yaqub ibn Abd Al-Haqq, and sought the assistance of King Alfonso X. Ruy López de Mendoza, Admiral of Castile formed an armada to assist the Castilian crusades on the North African coast. Salé was an important strategic and commercial centre, and also the gateway to Azghar, the region of northern Morocco.

== Battle ==
The day before Eid al-Fitr in year 658 of the Hijra (September 1260), thirty-seven warships were sent to Salé by King Alfonso X. On 2 Shawwal, Castilian warriors landed in Salé and took the opportunity to perform the largest massacre in the history of the city. Citizens of Salé were busy celebrating Eid al-Fitr, and the Castilians killed many of them. The warriors plundered properties and destroyed everything in their path. Women, children, and the elderly were rounded up into the Great Mosque of Salé, where 3,000 of them were taken as slaves to Seville.

For two weeks, Salé remained under the occupation of the Castilians, before Sultan Yacoub ben Abdelhaq rushed to the aid of the city, and quickly ordered his troops to march to the gates of the city. He ordered that all Castilian soldiers were to be killed, but some were able to escape the attack after ransacking houses, and looting and burning shops. Following the liberation of the city, the Sultan ordered the construction of the Borj Adoumoue and a wall opposite the Bou Regreg.

After the failure of the battle, Ruy López de Mendoza fled to Portugal in fear of King Alfonso X.

== Notes ==
- ^[a] No ships were recorded to have been lost by the Castilians.
