= Great Mosque of Salé =

Mosque in Salé, Morocco

- المسجد الأعظم
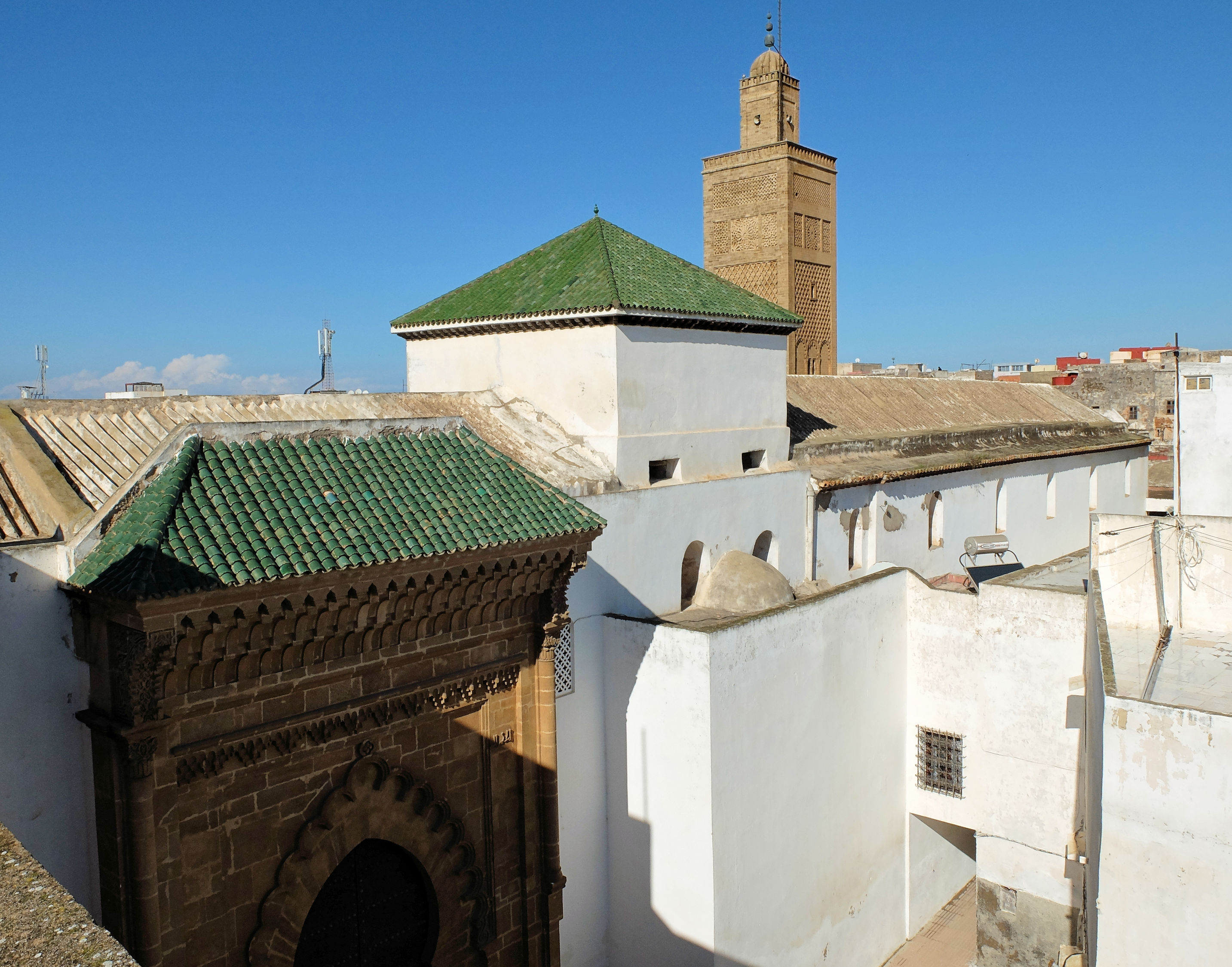

- Location of the mosque in Morocco

Religion
- Affiliation: Islam
- Ecclesiastical or organizational status: Mosque
- Status: Active

Location
- Location: Salé
- Country: Morocco
- Interactive map of Great Mosque of Salé
- Coordinates: 34°02′24″N 06°49′39″W

Architecture
- Type: Mosque architecture
- Completed: c. 1030 CE; 1196 (rebuilt); 18th century (major modifications)

The Great Mosque of Salé (Arabic: الجامع الأعظم, romanized: al-Jama' al-A'dam), also known as the Masjid al-Tal'a, is a historic mosque in Salé, Morocco. It is the main mosque of the old city. Covering an area of 5,070 m^{2} (54,600 sq ft), it is the third-largest mosque in Morocco.

A first mosque on this site may have been built between 1028 and 1030 CE. The current mosque was the result of a reconstruction and expansion by the Almohad ruler Yaqub al-Mansur in 1196. Further renovations in the 18th century gave the building its present-day appearance. It was severely damaged in the Bombardment of Salé of 1851 and was briefly closed during the French protectorate in Morocco.

== History ==
The mosque has been destroyed and rebuilt many times since the beginning of the city's history. A first mosque may have been built under the orders of Temim Ibn Ziri, a leader of the Banu Ifran tribe, in 420 AH (c. 1030 CE).

A new, larger mosque was built in 1196 under Abu Yusuf Yaqub al-Mansur's orders after the old mosque's roof had collapsed. The architect of the Almohad building was known as al-Gharnati – a name which suggests he was from Granada in Al-Andalus. According to tradition, 700 French slaves were involved in the reconstruction under al-Mansur's orders.

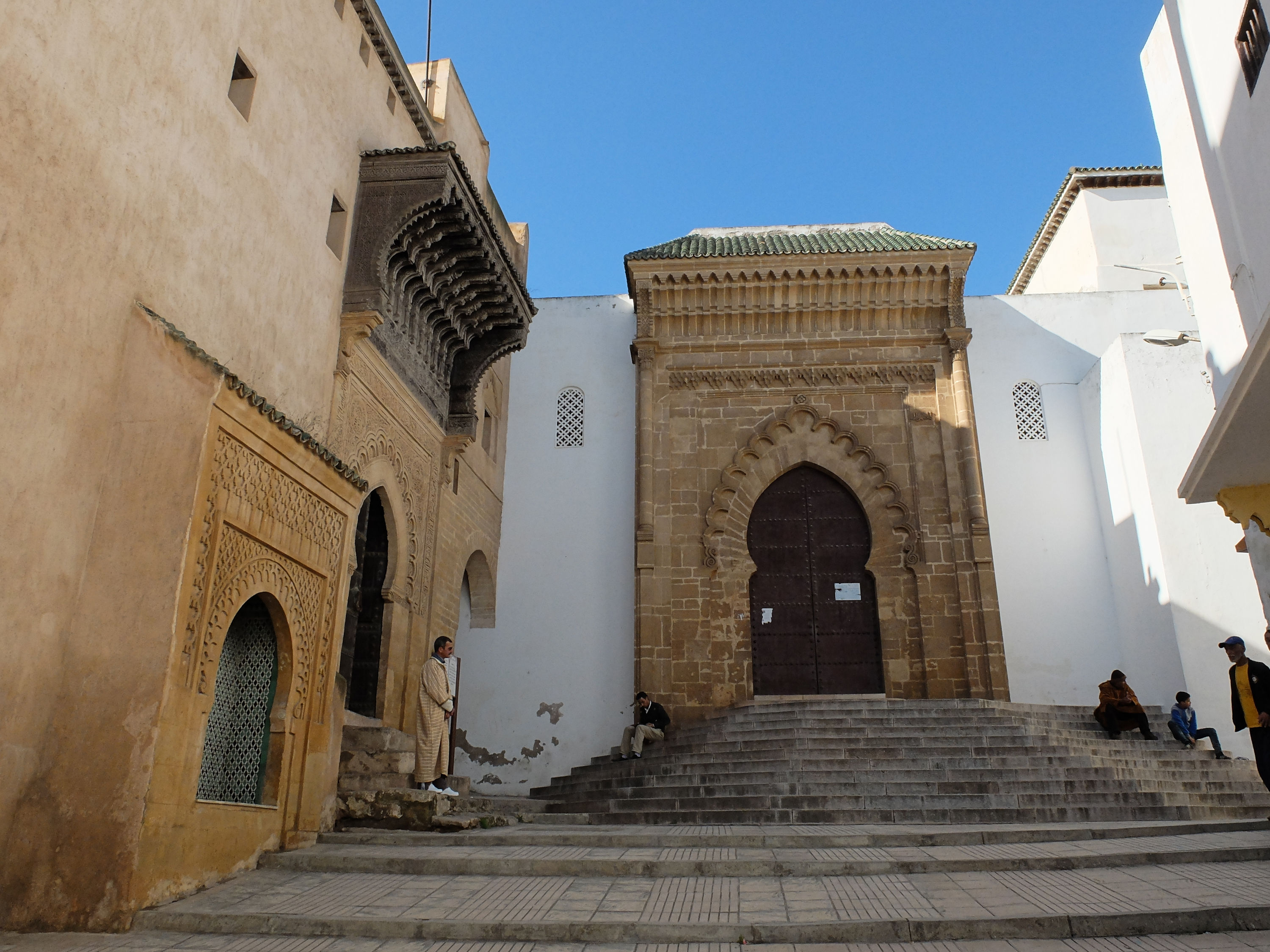
Entrance to the mosque (center) and to the adjacent 14th-century Marinid Madrasa (left)

In 1260, Salé was sacked and occupied by Castilian forces, during which 3000 women, children and elderly residents of the city were gathered in the mosque and taken as slaves for Seville. The Marinid sultan Abu Yusuf Yaqub reconquered the city soon afterwards. In 1342 another Marinid sultan, Abu al-Hasan, built the Madrasa of Abu al-Hasan next to the mosque, adding to its development as a religious and intellectual center of the city.

The mosque was largely rebuilt and modified over time, and its present appearance dates from the 18th century, under the 'Alawi dynasty. The mosque's current minaret likewise dates from the 'Alawi period. In 1851, Salé was bombarded by French forces, and the mosque was severely damaged after being struck by six cannonballs.

During the French protectorate in Morocco, the mosque was used for nationalist gatherings in the 1930s, led by people such as Said Hajji, Ahmed Maaninou, Boubker el-Kadiri, and Abu Bakr Zniber. The French protectorate later closed the mosque to prevent it being used as a place to awaken awareness of nationalist sentiment, but it later re-opened.

== Gallery ==
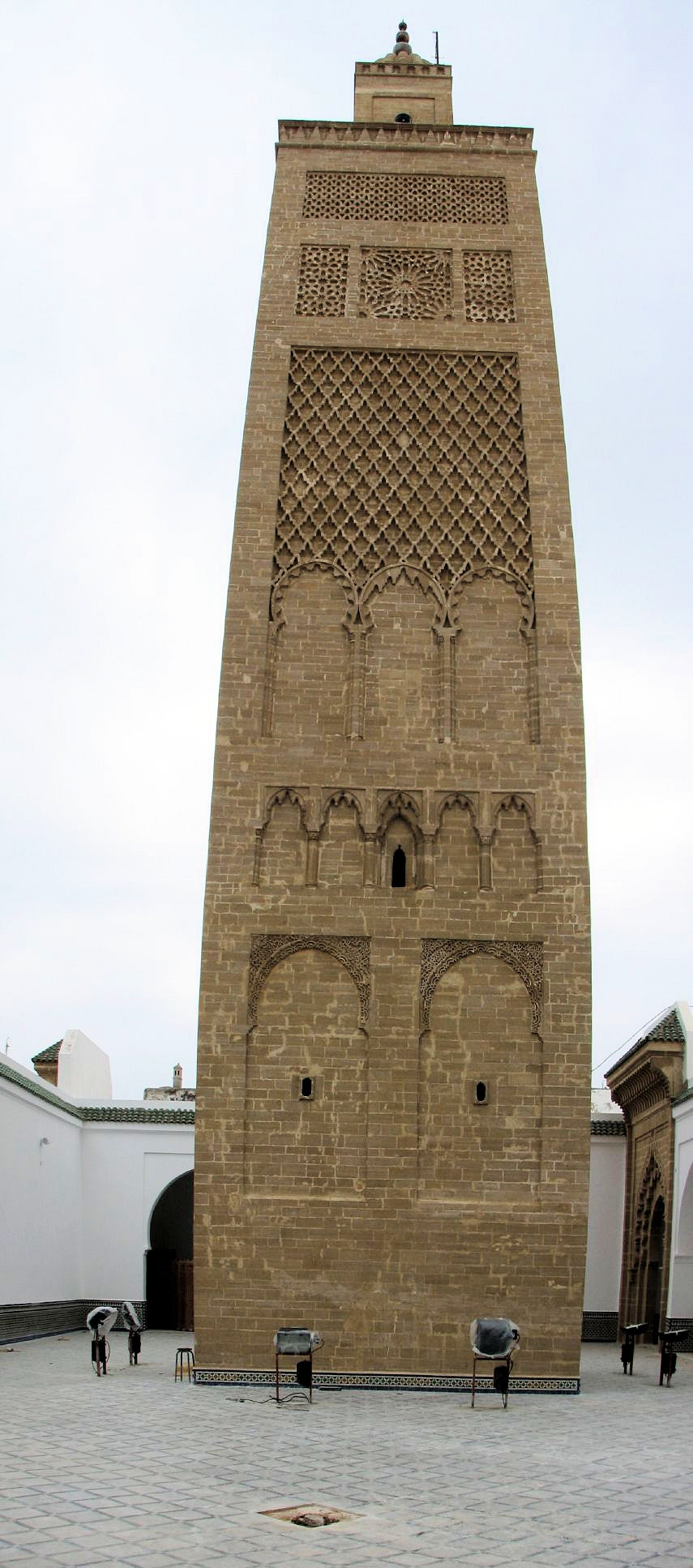
The minaret of the mosque

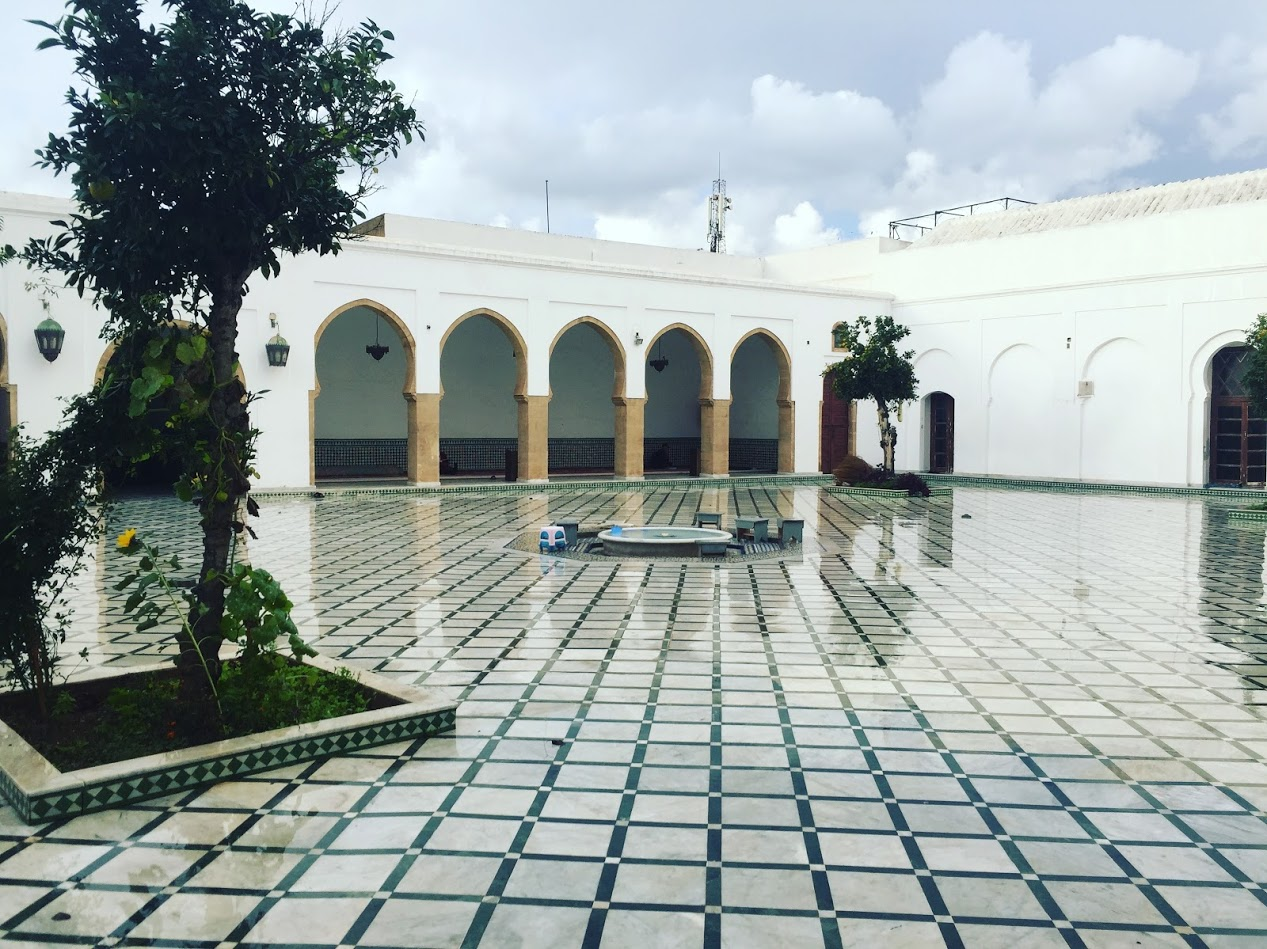
The main courtyard (sahn) of the mosque

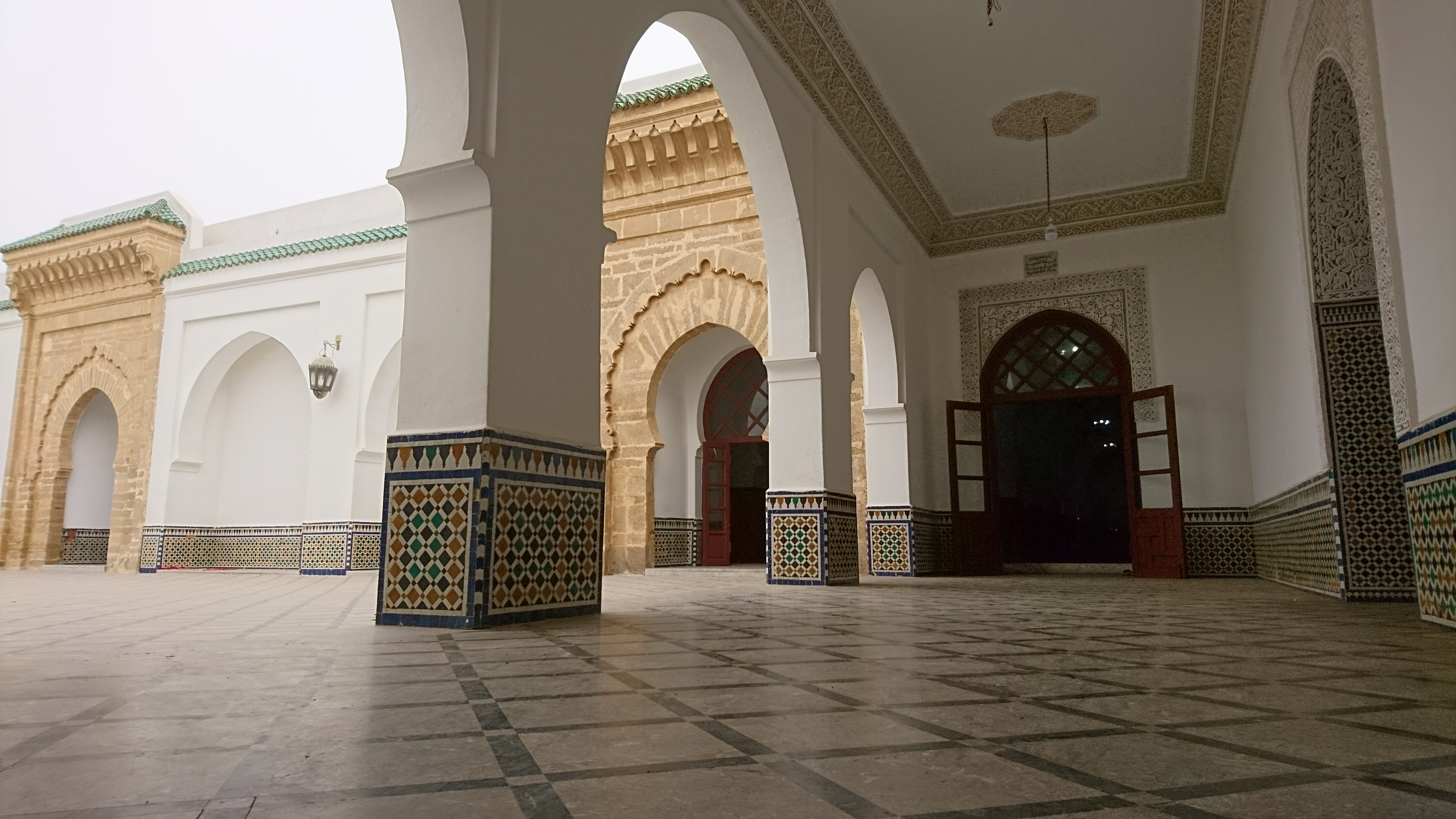
The gallery around the courtyard

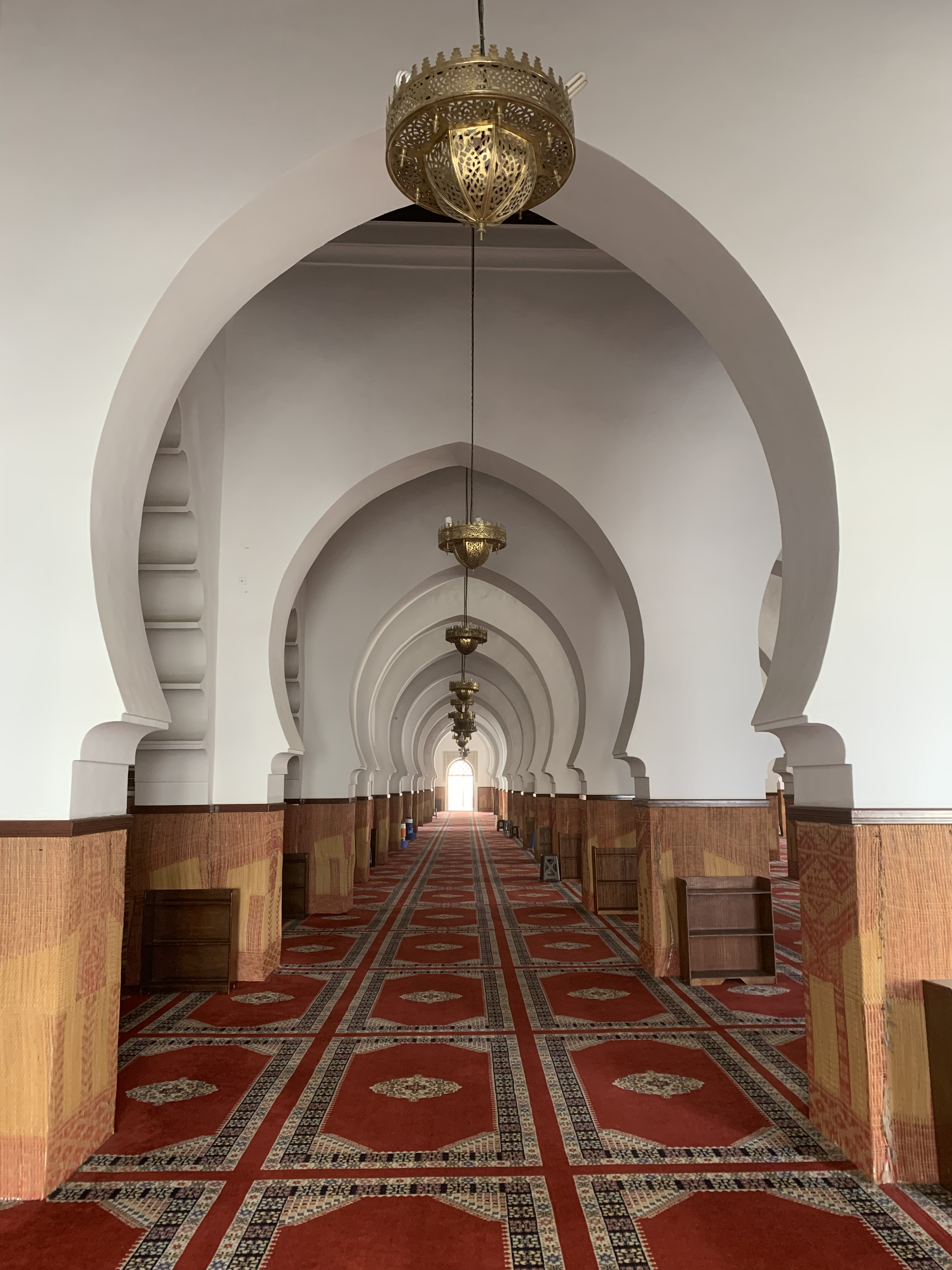
Inside the prayer hall of the mosque

== See also ==
- Madrasa of Abu al-Hasan
- List of mosques in Morocco
