= Salé-Tabriquet railway station =

Railway station in Morocco

Salé-Tabriquet محطة سلا تابريكت
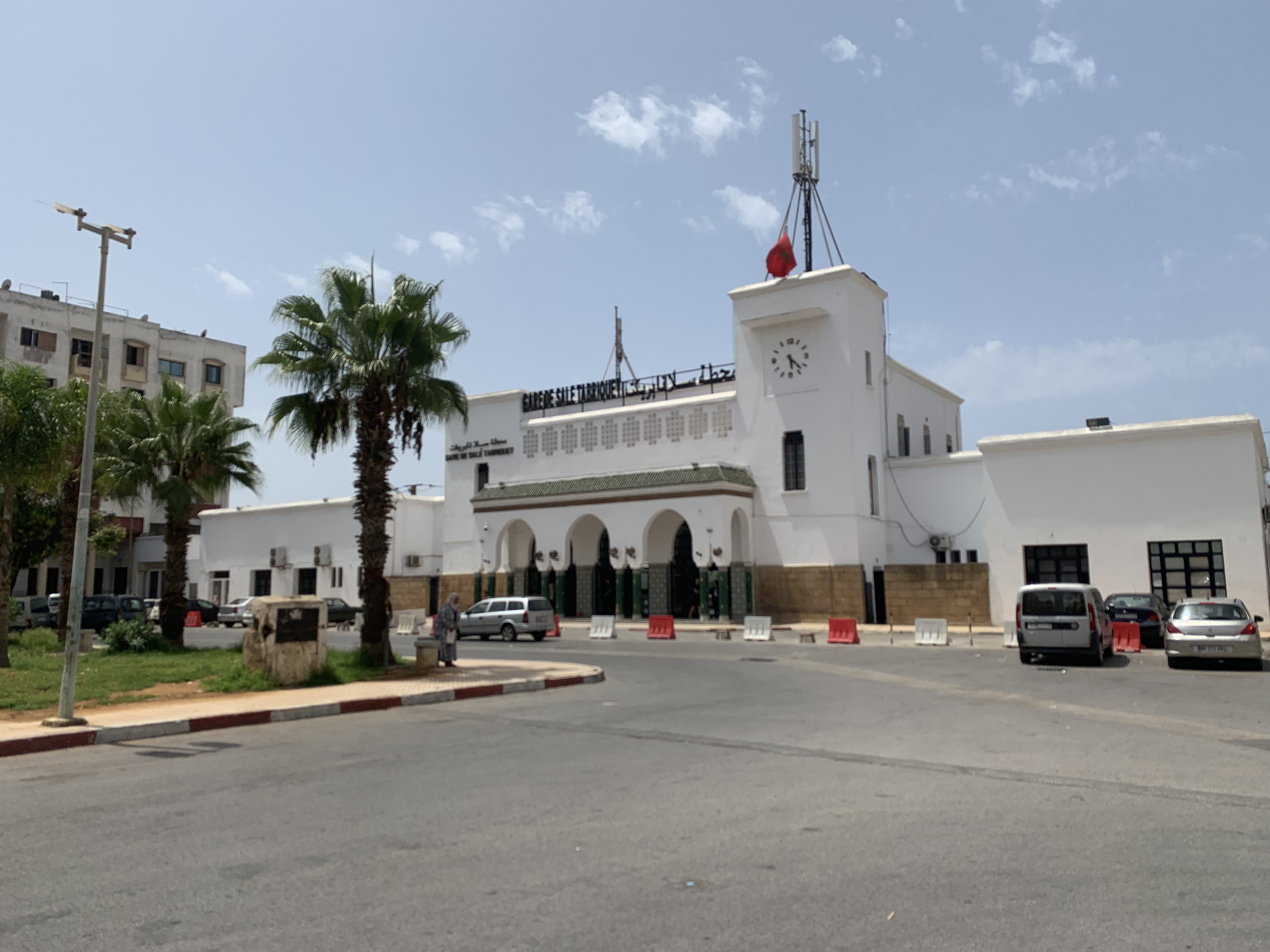
- Salé-Tabriquet Entrance in 2019

General information
- Location: Salé; Morocco
- Coordinates: 34.0525°N 6.80537°W
- Owner: Kingdom of Morocco
- Operator: ONCF
- Tracks: 2

Services
Preceding station		Following station
Salé-City towards Casa-Port Terminal	Train Navette Rapide	Bouknadel towards Kenitra-Medina
Location

Salé-Tabriquet railway station (Arabic: محطة سلا تابريكت) is a train terminal administered by ONCF in the district of Tabriquet, in Salé, Morocco, serving the northern suburbs of the city. The station is the second train station in Salé in terms of traffic, after the Salé-City railway station.

During the COVID-19 pandemic in Morocco, the Moroccan National Railways Office decided to close Salé Tabriquet station starting from April 18, 2020
