= Zawiya al-Nussak =

Historic monument in Salé, Morocco

- زاوية النساك
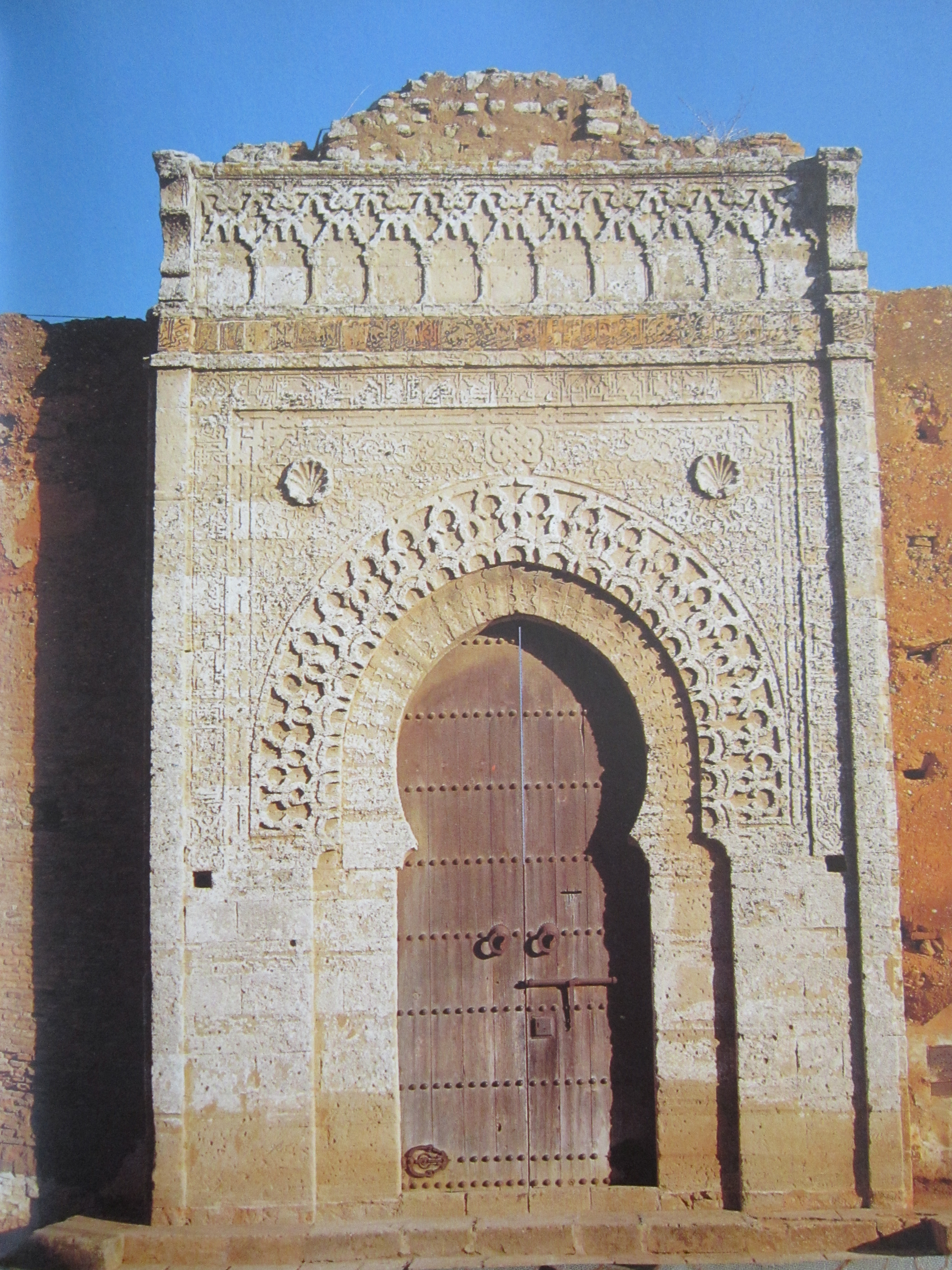
- The entrance portal of the zawiya (photo from 2012, before recent restorations)
- Interactive map of the Zawiya al-Nussak area

General information
- Type: zawiya
- Architectural style: Moorish (Marinid)
- Location: Salé, Morocco
- Coordinates: 34°02′9.1″N 6°48′48.5″W
- Completed: 1356

Technical details
- Material: stone, rammed earth

The Zawiya al-Nussak (Arabic: زاوية النساك; also transliterated as Zaouiat en-Noussak) is a historic zawiya (religious complex and residence) located just outside the old city walls of Salé, Morocco.

== History ==
The zawiya was built by the Marinid sultan Abu Inan in 1356. A former inscription recorded that its construction was completed on 27 Sha'ban 757 AH (25 August 1356 CE). The building's name, meaning "Zawiya of the Ascetics", comes from the writings of Ibn al-Khatib.

The zawiya was probably occupied by Sufi students, led by a sheikh, who prayed and studied the Qur'an together. Unlike other zawiyas in North Africa, it was not centered around the tomb of a Muslim saint and was not the center of a specific Sufi brotherhood. Nearby, however, was the tomb of a Muslim saint named Sidi Bel Abbas, along with other cemeteries. For this reason, some sources referred to the zawiya as the Zawiya of Sidi Bel Abbas. The zawiya also acted as a kind of funduq (caravanserai), which provided lodging for travelers and pilgrims of all kinds. Travelers and caravans that arrived to Salé late in the day, after the city gates were locked, could be accommodated here.

The building was probably heavily damaged by a fire at an unknown date. Its southwest entrance portal collapsed in 1912. During the 20th century it stood largely in ruins, except for its northwest entrance portal. Its remains were excavated and studied by archeologist Jacques Meunié in 1948. According to writer Richard Parker in 1981, the zawiya's remains were being used as a private residence at the time. The building has since been largely reconstructed. The stone portal of its northwest entrance is the only major feature preserved from the original structure.

== Architecture ==
The only well-preserved part of the building is its ornate entrance portal of carved stone. This main gate, facing northwest, was known as Bab Salé. The semi-circular band of interlacing lines around the archway, the arabesques filling the spandrels, and the carved shell or palmette in the center of the spandrels are reminiscent of the Almohad-era Bab Oudaya and Bab er-Rouah in Rabat, as well as the more contemporary Marinid gate of Chellah. The corbels at the top corners may have once supported an overhanging roof above the doorway. Two Arabic inscription bands, one in Kufic and the other in cursive script, feature Qur'anic verses. A secondary entrance on the southwest side of the building, called Bab Chellah, collapsed in 1912. It probably resembled the main entrance portal. It featured an inscription which was documented prior to the portal's collapse and noted the building's foundation by Abu Inan and its completion in 1956.

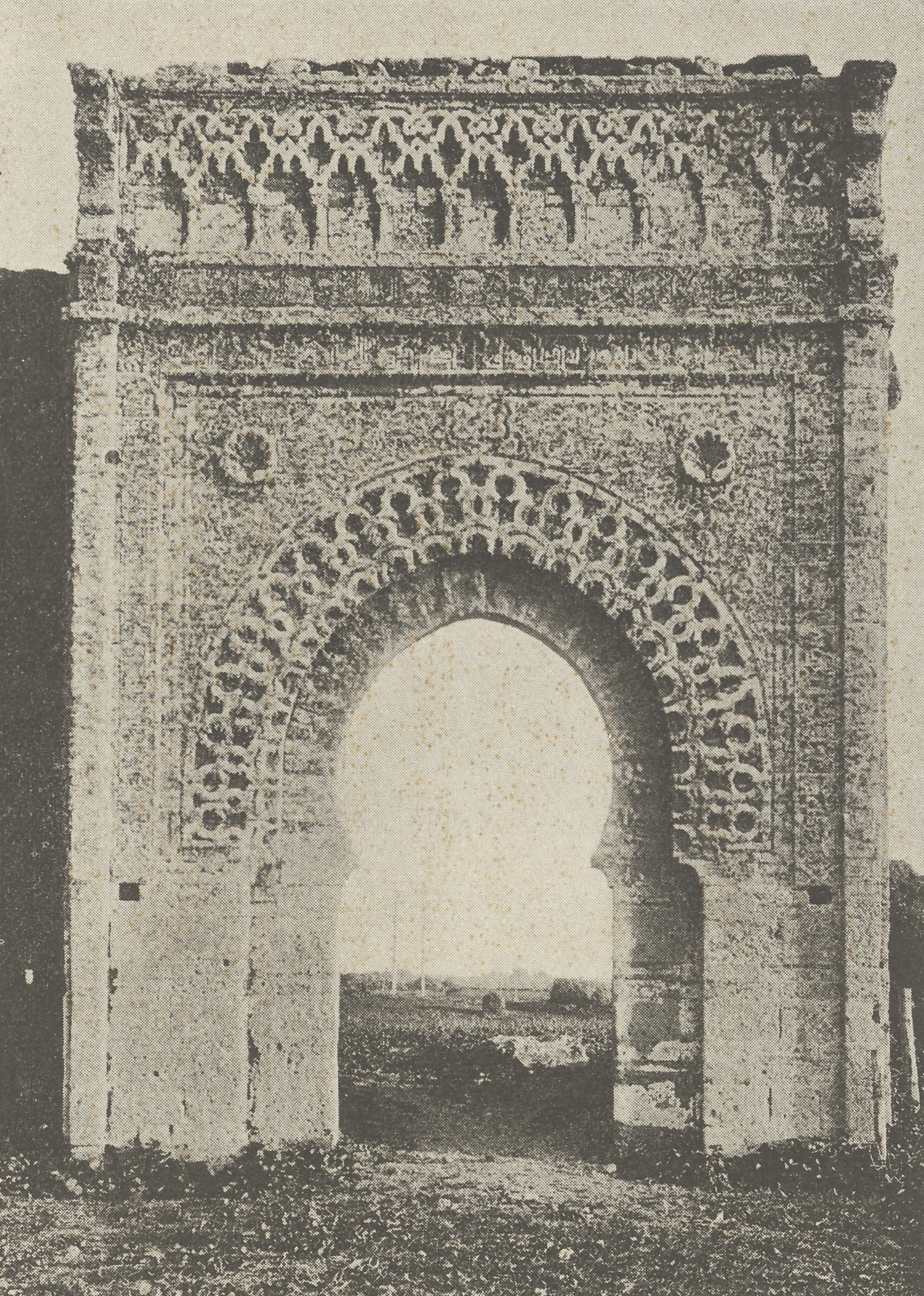
Entrance portal c. 1921

The rest of the building, which was made of pisé, has not been well-preserved. It has a rectangular floor plan measuring 34.9 m (115 ft) long and 26.8 m (88 ft) wide. The building's layout bears many resemblances to the earlier zawiya that Abu Inan built at Chellah, not far from here, suggesting that it the latter may have served as a model for this one. Behind the entrance was a vestibule leading to the main courtyard. From the vestibule were also passages that led to a mida'a (Arabic: ميضأة; "ablutions facility") to the north and living quarters to the south that likely belonged to the sheikh of the institution. The main courtyard was centered around a large rectangular water basin, flanked by a circular fountain at either end, and surrounded by galleries that led to other rooms, possibly used for teaching and meetings. The living quarters of the students were likely located on an upper floor that no longer exists. The floors and lower walls of the courtyard were decorated with zellij tilework, which Jacques Meunié documented during 20th-century excavations. Meunié also found sparse fragments of carved stucco, which suggest that the rest of the building also featured this type decoration, as in other Marinid madrasas.
