= Salé-City railway station =

Railway station in Morocco

Salé-City محطة سلا المدينة
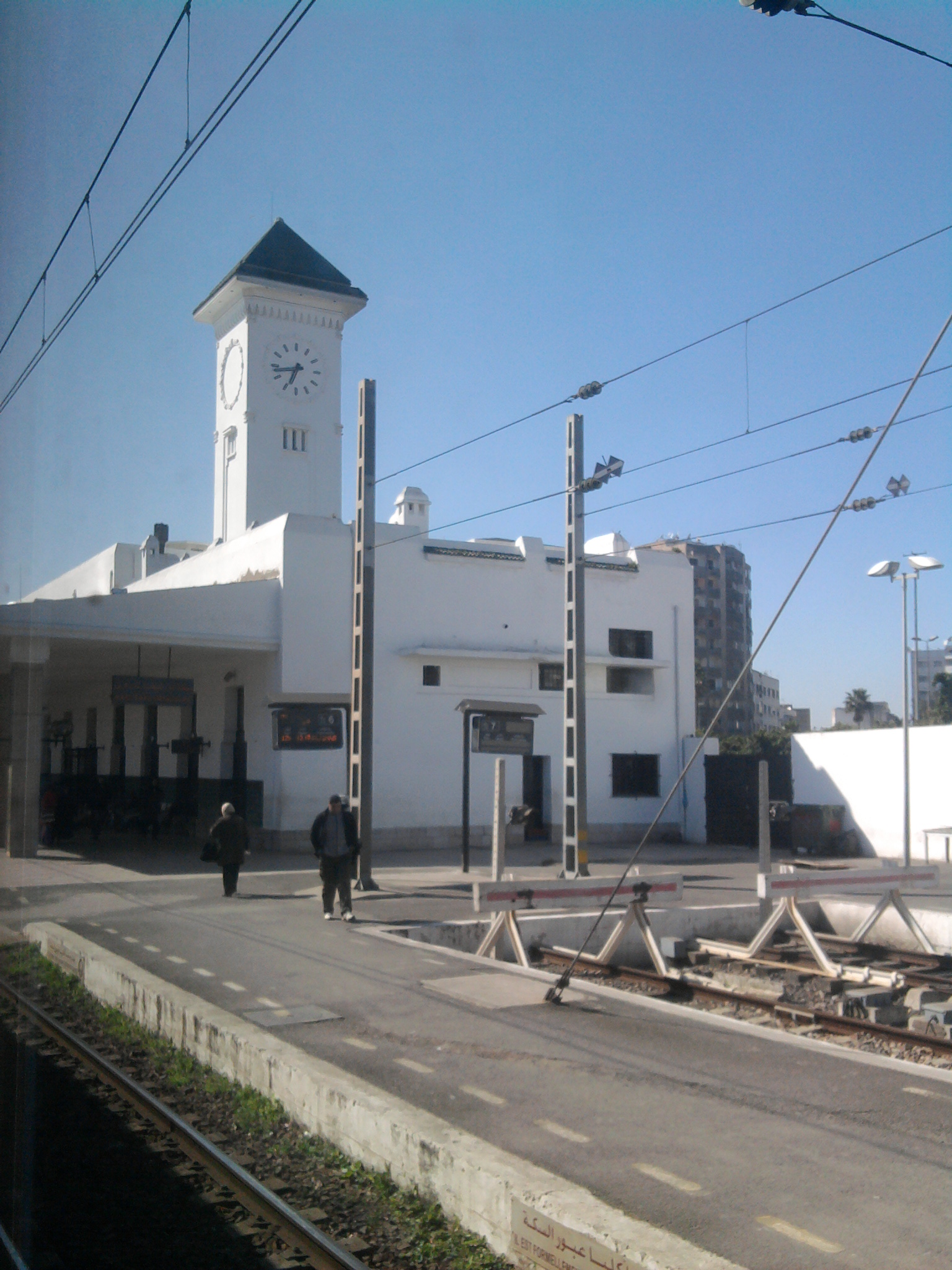
- Salé-City station in 2011

General information
- Location: Salé; Morocco
- Coordinates: 34.0385°N 6.8155°W
- Owner: Kingdom of Morocco
- Operator: ONCF
- Tracks: 2

Services
Preceding station		Following station
Rabat-Ville towards Casa-Port Terminal	Train Navette Rapide	Salé-Tabriquet towards Kenitra-Medina
At nearby stop
Preceding station	Rabat–Salé tramway	Following station
Bab Rouah towards Madinat al-Irfane	L1	Place al-Joulane towards Hay Karima
Location

Salé-City railway station or Gare de Salé-Ville (Arabic: محطة سلا المدينة) is a train terminal administered by ONCF in Salé, Morocco. The station is the biggest train station in Salé in terms of traffic, and is considered as the main train station of the city. It is directly connected with the Rabat–Salé tramway.
