= Madrasa of Abu al-Hasan =

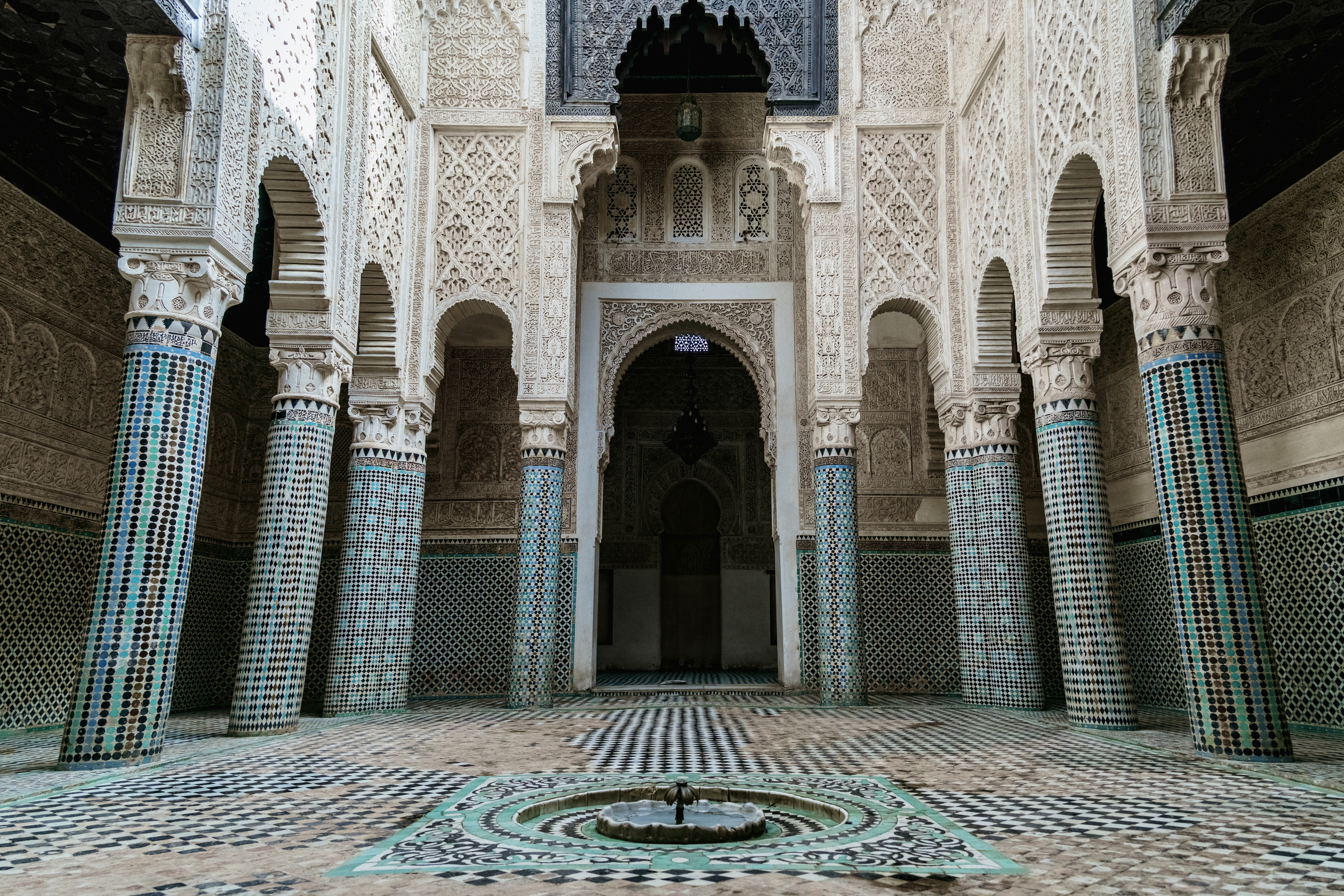
- The courtyard of the madrasa.
- Interactive map of the Madrasa of Abu al-Hasan area
- Alternative names: Marinid Madrasa (of Salé)

General information
- Type: madrasa
- Architectural style: Moorish (Marinid)
- Location: Salé, Morocco
- Coordinates: 34°02′23.5″N 6°49′38.1″W
- Completed: 1341

The Madrasa of Abu al-Hasan, also referred to as the Marinid Madrasa (of Salé), is a medieval madrasa located within the old city of Salé, Morocco. It was built in the 14th century by the Marinid sultan Abu al-Hasan next to the Grand Mosque of Salé and it is notable for its rich decoration.

== History ==
According to an inscription on the wooden canopy of the entrance portal, construction of the madrasa began in 1332–1333 on the orders of the Marinid sultan Abu al-Hasan (r. 1331–1348), who was also responsible for founding multiple other madrasas and religious complexes in his reign. Construction was finished in 1341–1342, as recorded by a foundation inscription carved on a marble plaque in the northwestern gallery of the courtyard. The madrasa was built to help further develop the nearby Great Mosque of Salé as the focus of religious and intellectual life in the city.

== Architecture ==
The madrasa is entered through an ornate stone portal with a horseshoe arch doorway. This entrance leads to a small vestibule, from which a staircase on the side leads to the upper floors. Beyond the vestibule, one enters sideways into the corner of the central courtyard, which measures about 8 by 5 metres (26 by 16 ft). The courtyard is paved with zellij tilework, features a small central fountain, and is ringed by a gallery decorated with carved stucco and carved wood, supported by round masonry columns. The spaces between the gallery columns and the outer wall of the courtyard are covered by painted wood ceilings carved into geometric star patterns. One section of these ceilings has been restored to its approximate original colours. The whole building, like the nearby Grand Mosque, is aligned or oriented with the qibla (direction of prayer) of the time (i.e. roughly southeast). Accordingly, at the far end of the courtyard is a large rectangular prayer room whose mihrab is surrounded by intricate stucco-carved surfaces and windows. The room is divided into three spaces by arches on either side of the mihrab and covered by more timber ceilings. The upper floor is occupied by the student cells and living quarters. Unlike other madrasas of this type, the students' rooms on the upper two floors do not have windows looking into the courtyard.

Possibly even more than other Marinid madrasas, this building shows similarities with Nasrid art and architecture such as the palaces of the Alhambra), attesting to the shared artistic vocabulary between the two regions. The decoration consists of zellij tilework covering the floor and the lower walls, transitioning into intricately carved stucco decoration above, and topped by carved cedar wood surfaces and a wooden canopy above. Both the wood and the stucco are carved with calligraphic decoration and with a variable repertoire of geometric, arabesque, and floral/vegetal patterns. A rectangular marble panel carved with a foundation inscription of the building was originally set into the northwestern wall of the courtyard (opposite the mihrab and the prayer room).

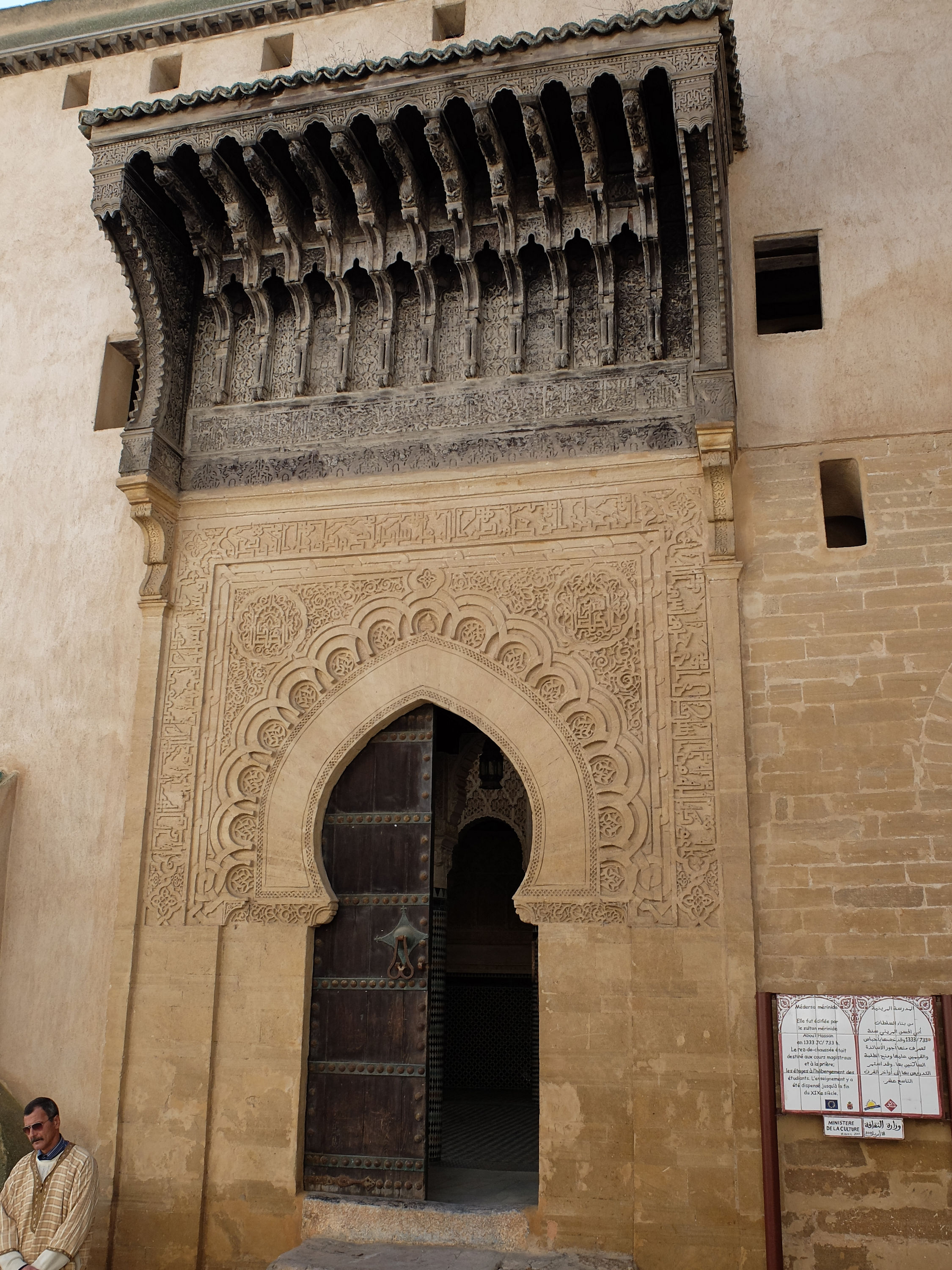
The entrance portal of the madrasa

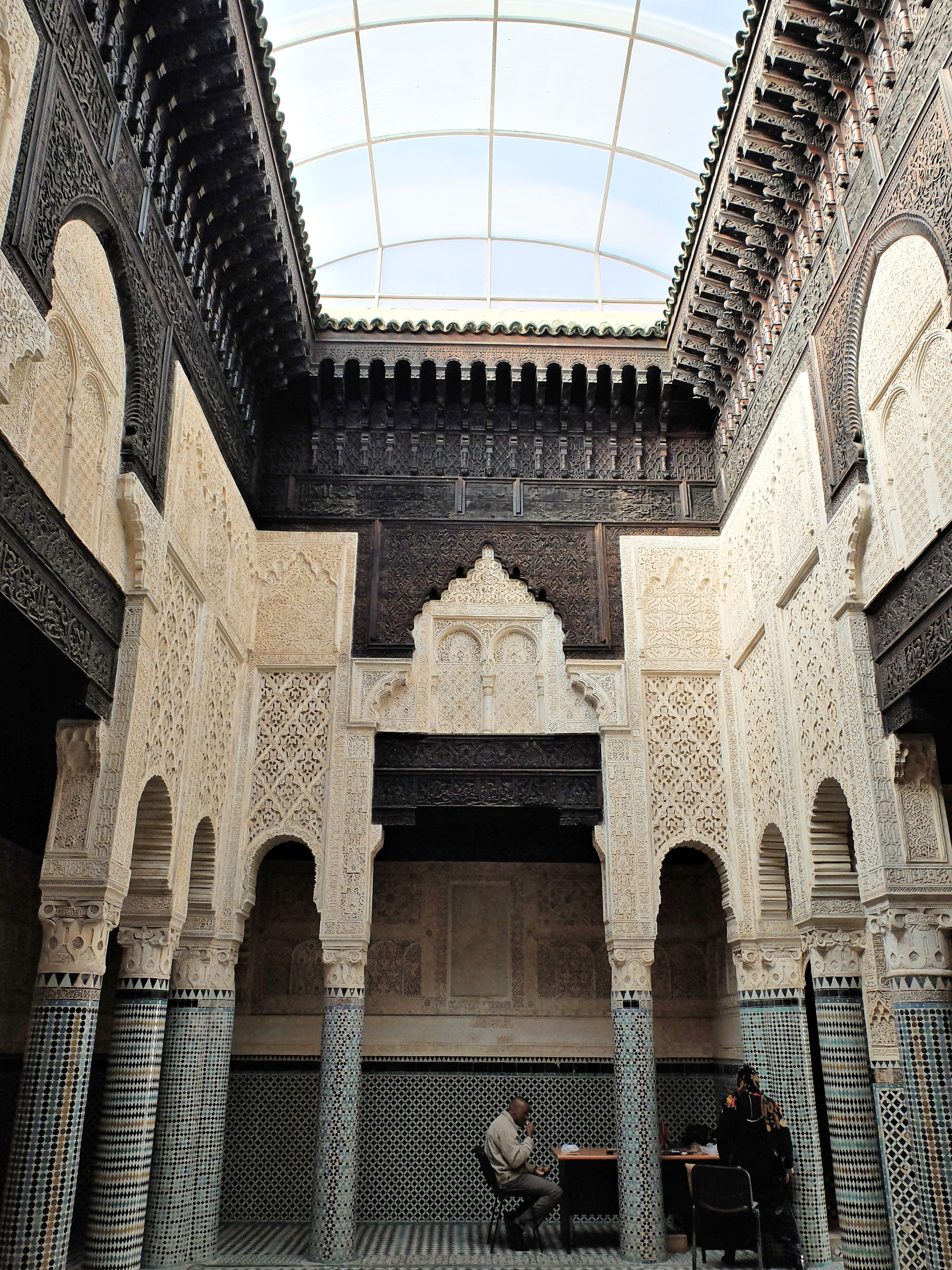
The courtyard of the madrasa, looking northwest

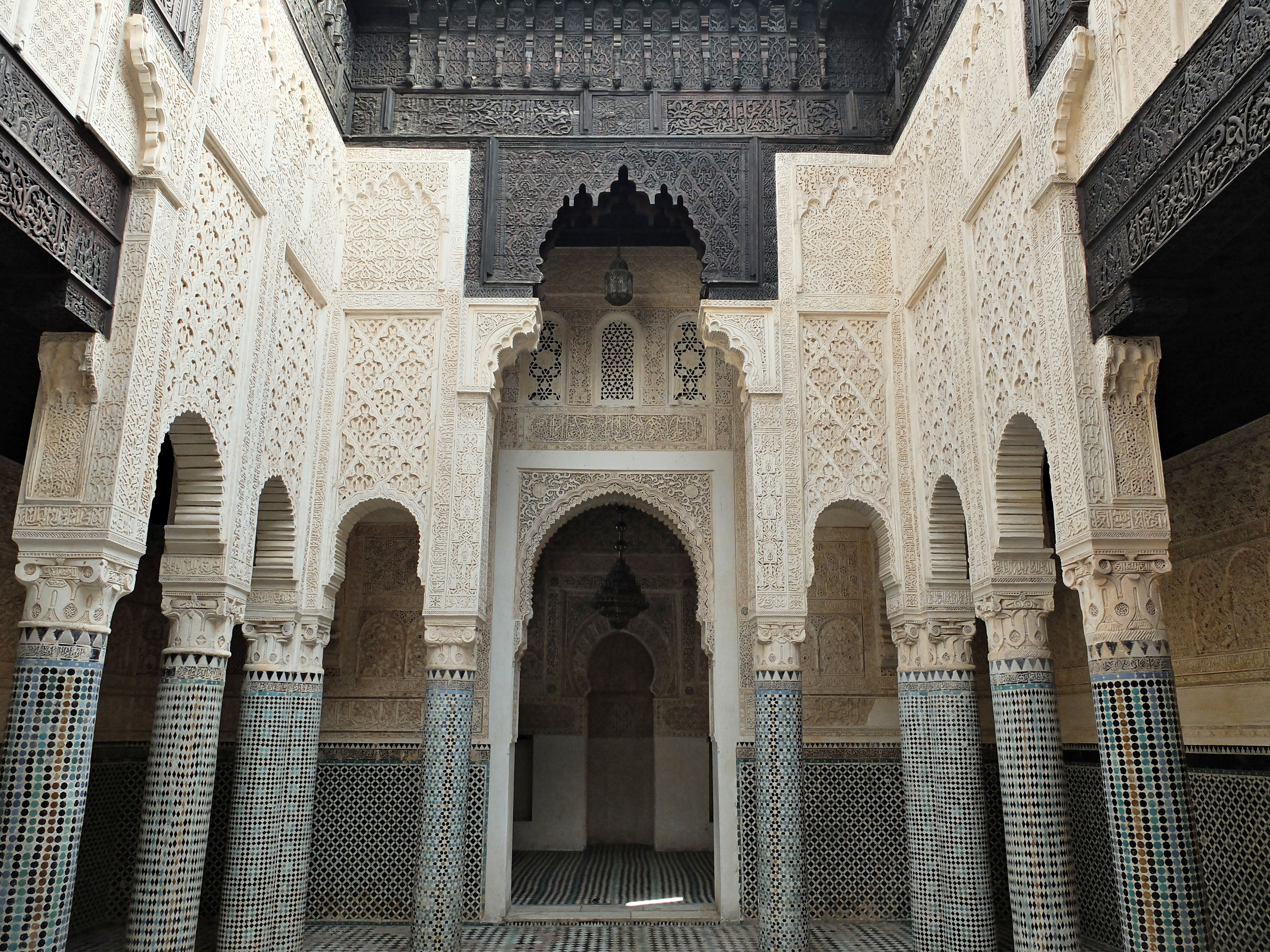
The courtyard of the madrasa, looking southeast towards the mihrab

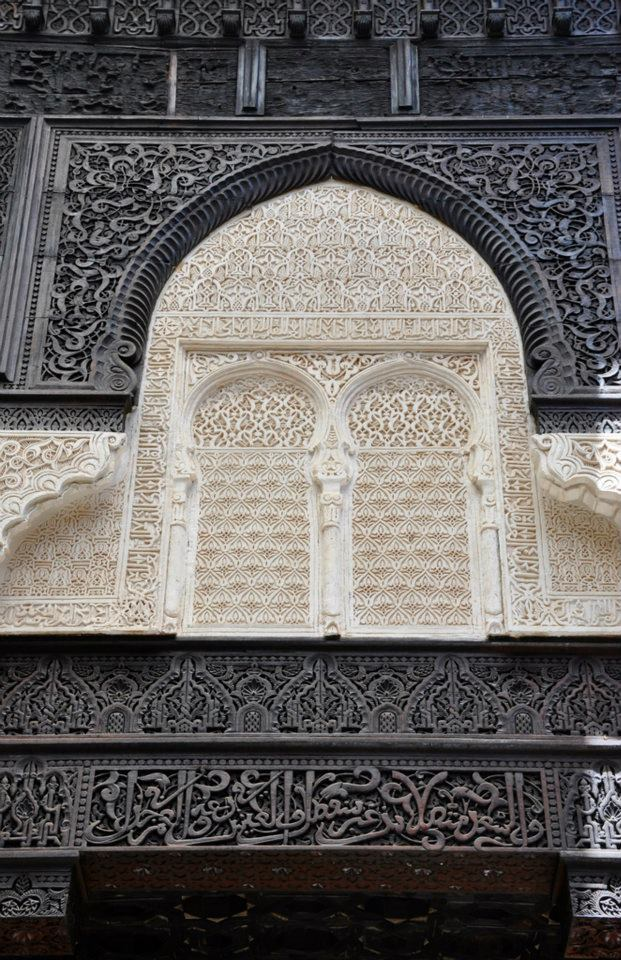
Stucco and wood carvings on one of the lateral galleries of the courtyard

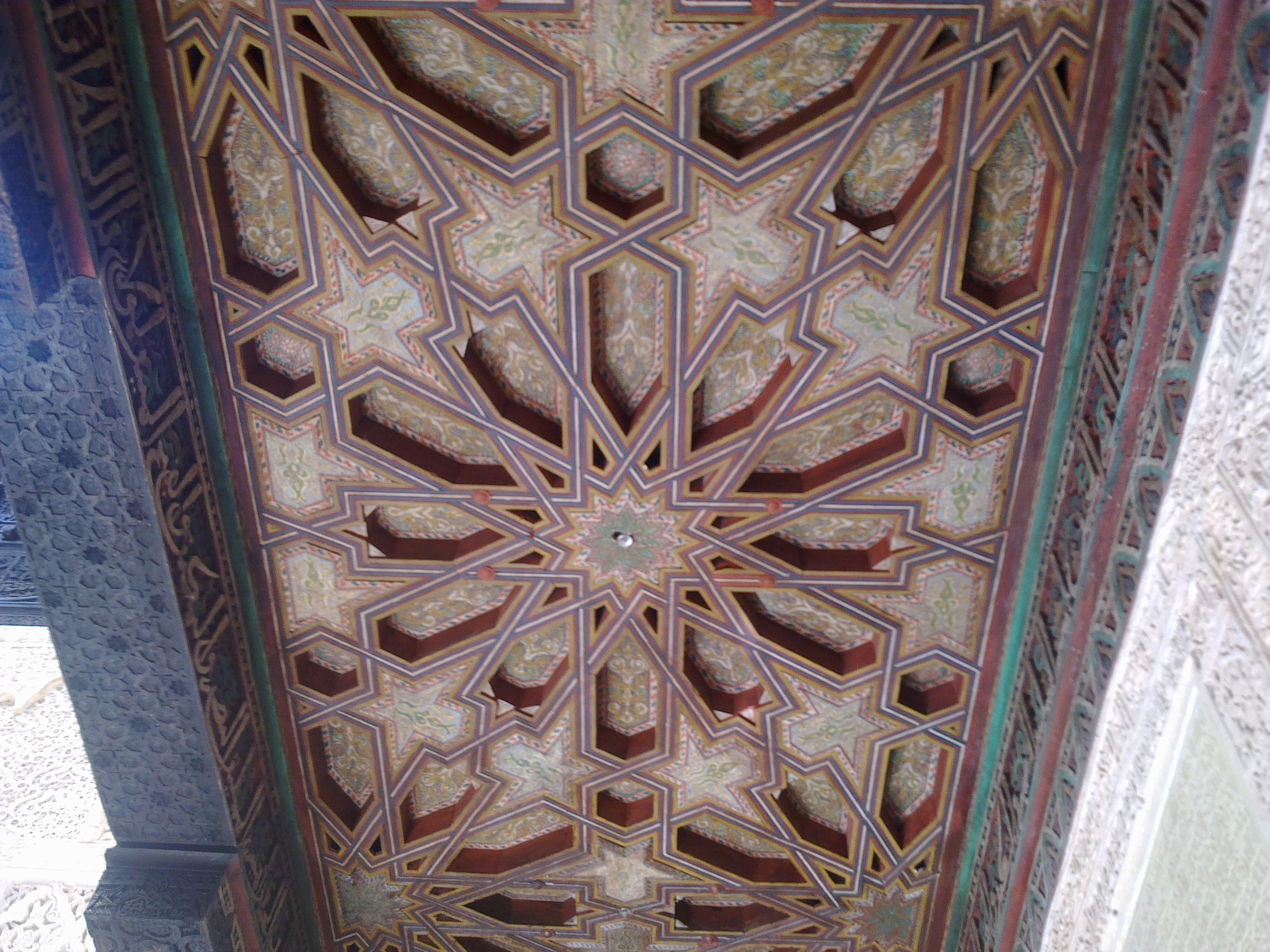
A restored painted wooden ceiling under one of the courtyard galleries

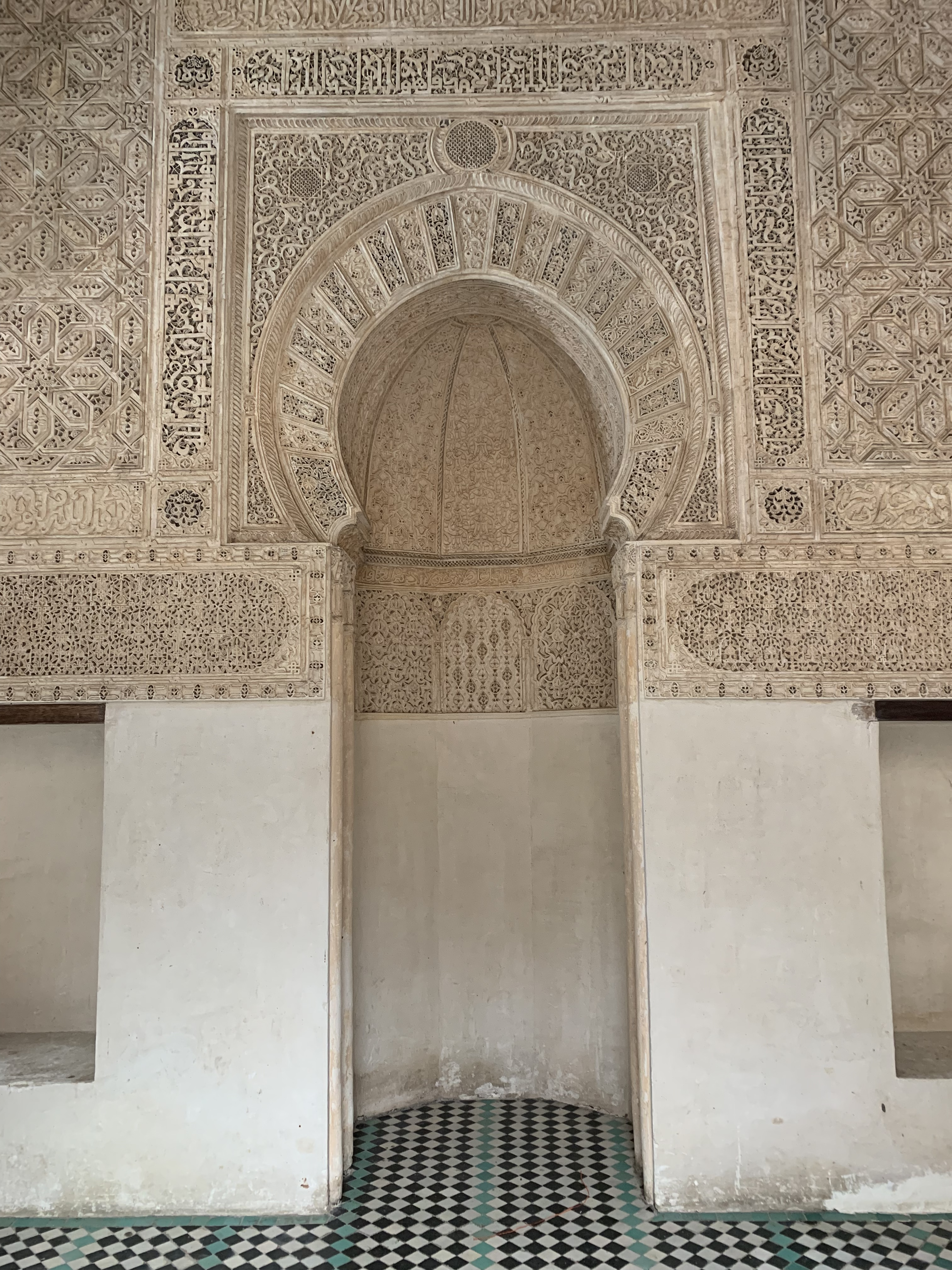
The mihrab of the prayer room

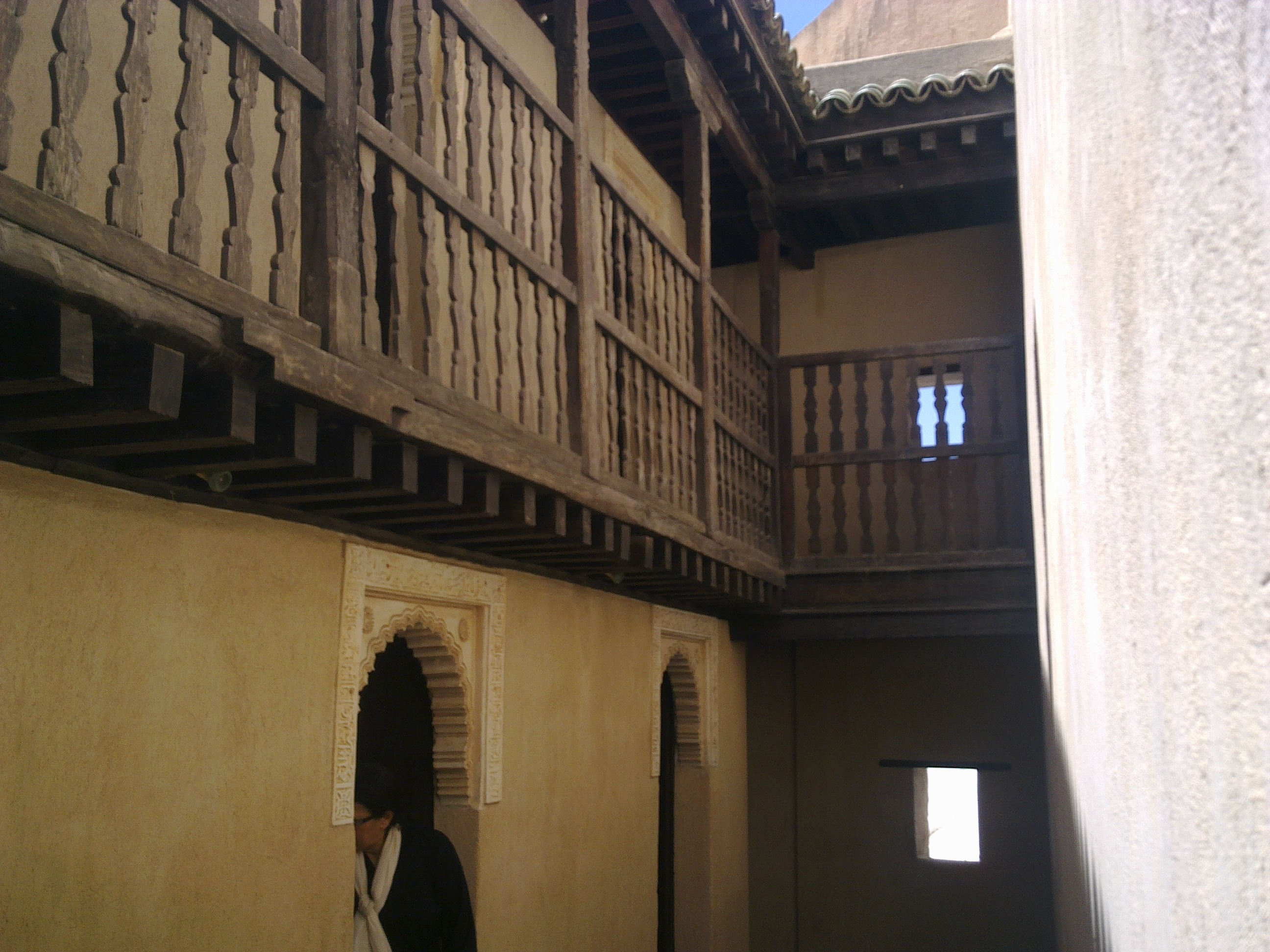
The student cells on the upper floor
