= Said Hajji =

Moroccan journalist

Said Hajji سعيد حجي
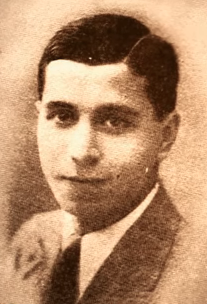
- Born: 29 February 1912; Salé, Morocco
- Died: 2 March 1942 (aged 30)
- Occupation: Journalist
- Known for: Journalism; Political Activism
- Website: said.hajji.org/en/

Said Hajji (in Arabic: سعيد حجي) (Salé, 29 February 1912 – 2 March 1942) was a Moroccan journalist and thinker. He was known as the founder of the "Moroccan Nationalist Press". and was one of the first Moroccan journalists during the French Protectorate in Morocco.

== His life ==
Said Hajji was born on 29 February 1912, in the old town of Salé, in Morocco, one month before the signing of the Treaty of Fes, marking the start of the French Protectorate in Morocco.

Said started to be interested in politics since a very young age, where he engaged with his brothers and friends in different initiatives, both in politics and journalism. Said was an active member of the Istiqlal Party, asking for the independence of Morocco. In 1937, he founded the Arabic-language newspaper Al-Maghrib (المغرب Morocco), criticizing French colonialism. His newspaper was censored several times by the colonial authorities.

Said Hajji died young at the age of 30, due to a chronic condition. His legacy is still present in Morocco, especially in his hometown Salé, where a neighborhood is named after him, as well as a school and a cultural center.
