= Nores (surname) =

Nores is a surname of Spanish origin. Notable people with the surname include:

- Pilar Nores (born 1949), Argentine-born Peruvian economist
- Rogelio Nores Martínez (1906–1975), Argentine engineer and politician
