= Hajj Ali Zniber =

Hajj Ali Zniber (1844–1914), full name Ali bin Ahmed bin Abd al-Qadir Zniber Lettam, is a Moroccan writer and nationalist. He is known, with Abdellah Bensaid, for having introduced the first constitution for the improvement of the political situation in Morocco in 1904 : Safeguarding the independence and rejection of colonial manipulation.

== Biography ==
After traveling to the Middle East to perform the pilgrimage to Mecca Hajj Ali moved to Egypt where he lived in the import-export where he had the opportunity to know the parallel Egyptian scholars of his time. His 23 years in Egypt allowed him to inspire constitutional ideas of the Middle East to theorize some political reforms he opposes the settlement and advocates for the preservation of independence. "It was early in aware of the danger of French colonialism and lavished a series of tips to Sultan Moulay Abdelaziz. He also submitted to the Supreme Moulay Youssef a draft constitution. The Sbihi Library in Salé contains several manuscripts written by the person himself." His life overall still very unknown to historians. After his return to Morocco, while remaining in contact with Saletins scientists, he moved to Tangier where he met the Minister of Foreign Affairs and to Fez where he is responsible for the printing and distribution of Moroccan press and published several books there. After its proposed constitution before the Sultan, Ali Zniber emphasizes the protection of the national identity and protect the Arabic language.
