= Nores (musician) =

Moroccan musician

Nores ظروف الكدار
- Also known as: Nores
- Born: April 16, 1979 (age 47); Salé, Morocco
- Occupations: Composer, Singer
- Years active: 1995–present
- Website: noresproduction.com

Dourouf El Guaddar (Arabic: ظروف الكدار; born 16 April 1979) known professionally as Nores, is a Moroccan rapper and music producer.

== Early life ==
Nores was born on 16 April 1979 in Salé, Morocco.

== Career ==
Nores got into Hip Hop in the mid 1995. In 1997, he founded—along with other rappers from Salé— the rap group Siouf El Borj which had initial success locally until its members separated in 1999. In 2006, he produced—along with DBF, DJ VAN, and Thug Face—an album for Don Bigg titled Mgharba ‘Tal Moute. He produced for many other hip hop artists in Morocco including Fatiwizz, Majesticon, Loubna, Tar, Sator and Rabat Crew. In 2007, he released his first album "Bit Ennar" containing 17 songs.

In 2015, Nores composed the soundtracks for Waadi a Moroccan TV Series (lit. My promise) and Dar Dmana a historical TV Series both broadcast by Al Aoula. In 2016, he presented the GEN10 talk show program with Oussema Ben Jelloun which was produced and aired by Medi1TV. And in 2018, he composed the soundtrack of Wala Aaalik another Moroccan Series produced by Al Aoula.

Nores often incorporates Standard Arabic into his work, contrary to hip hop artists in Morocco who rely on Darija—like Dizzy DROS "who claims that it is impossible to rap in Standard Arabic and that Nores’ use is strictly 'ironic'."

== Discography ==
=== Albums ===
- "Bit Ennar" (2007) (lit. "Chamber of Fire ")
- "Gangster Slawi" (2010)
- "L’Kaw" (2013)

=== Singles ===
- "Gangster Arabi" (2010)
- "Sehab Lhakka" (2007)
- "For Ever" (2007)
- "Qasit Snin" feat Loubna (2007)
- "Mekolina" feat Antonio (2007)
- "Men Dar Ldar" feat Fatiwiz (2007)
- "Slaba" feat Fatiwiz (2007)

== See also ==
- Moroccan hip hop
- Dizzy DROS
- Gnawi
