= Mohammed Zniber =

Moroccan writer and historian

Dr. Mohammed Zniber (1923–1993) was a Moroccan writer and historian. In February 1944, he was arrested by the French together with his brother and father and spent three months in prison.

== Works ==
- Mohamed Zniber, "L'itineraire psycho-intellectuel d'ibn Toumert, ambos en Mahdisme." Crise et changement dans l'Histoire du Maroc (Table ronde), Rabat, 1994, 15-29
- Mohammed Zniber, "La guerre du Rif: Mohammed ben Abd el Krim" in Le Mémorial du Maroc, 1912-1934 volume 5
- Mohammed Zniber, 1983. : "Zineb Nefzaouia", Le Mémorial du Maroc, Volume 2
- Mohammed Zniber, "Sens des médias chez les Almohades"; In Le Mémorial du Maroc, Tome II, p. 169-183
- Mohamed Zniber, "Le rôle d'Abd el-Krim dans la lutte pour la libértion nationale dans le Maghreb", in: Abd el Krim et la République du Rif. Actes du Colloque international d'etudes historiques et sociologiques, 18029 janvier 1973
- Mohamed Zniber, 1985, "Towards a new Interpretation of Islamic Culture", Islam Today, 3, 10-16, Littérature populaire marocaine, Rabat : Editions Okad, [1986]
- In collaboration with Mohammed Berrada (1938) and (Algerian Francophone) Mouloud Mammeri, on Frantz Fanon: ‘aw Maa’rakatu Ashshua’ub Al-Mutakhallifah (Frantz Fanon and the Struggle of Developing Countries) (1963).
- Études historiques dédiées au défunt Muhammad Zniber, coord. M. Al-Mansür et M. al-MagrawI, Rabat, 19874
- Mohamed Zniber, Al Hawa jadid, 1992
