= Salé =

Salé سلا (Arabic) ⵙⴰⵍⴰ (Standard Moroccan Tamazight)
- City
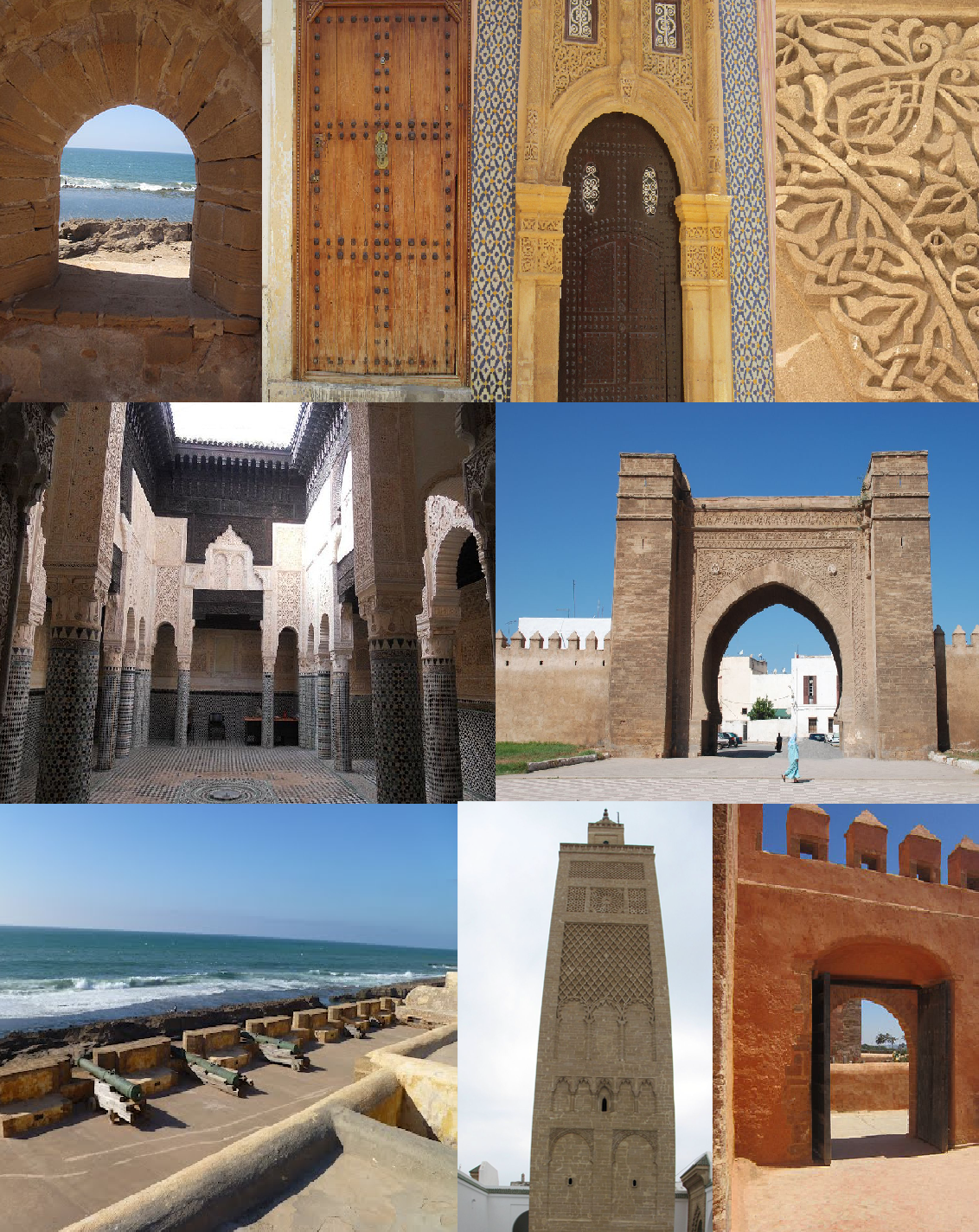
- Nickname: City of candles
- Interactive map of Salé
- Coordinates: 34°02′43″N 6°49′04″W
- Country: Morocco
- Region: Rabat-Salé-Kénitra
- Prefecture: Salé Prefecture
- Established: 11th century

Government
  - Mayor: Omar Sentissi (Istiqlal)
- Elevation: 0 to 115 m (0 to 377 ft)

Population (2024)
  - Total: 945,101 (Commune); 1,089,554 (Prefecture)
  - Rank: 5th in Morocco
- (Note: The High Commission for Planning defines the city of Salé as comprising the five arrondissements of Bab Lamrissa, Bettana, Hssaine, Layayda and Tabriquet.)
- Demonym: Slawi
- Time zone: UTC+0 (GMT)
- Website: Salé (in Arabic, Standard Moroccan Tamazight, French, and English)

Salé (Note: Arabic: سلا, romanized: salā, [salaː] Standard Moroccan Tamazight: ⵙⴰⵍⴰ. The city's name is sometimes transliterated as Salli, Sallee, or Sala.) is a city in northwestern Morocco, on the right bank of the Bou Regreg river, opposite the national capital Rabat, for which it serves as a commuter town. Along with some smaller nearby towns, Rabat and Salé together form a single metropolitan area.

Founded in the 11th century, Sale became a medieval merchant port and entrepot. Salé became a haven for pirates in the 17th century as an independent republic before being incorporated into Alawi Morocco. It recorded a population of 1,089,554 in the 2024 Moroccan census. The city still preserves its historic medina (old town), with many major monuments dating from the Marinid period (13th–15th centuries). Salé is connected to Rabat by a tramway and also contains the Rabat–Salé Airport, the main international airport serving both cities.

== History ==
=== Early history ===
The Phoenicians established a settlement called Sala, later the site of a Roman colony, Sala Colonia, across the river on the south side of the Bou Regreg estuary. The local Banu Ifran apparently cultivated the legend that the city's name was derived from that of Salah, son of Ham, son of Noah.

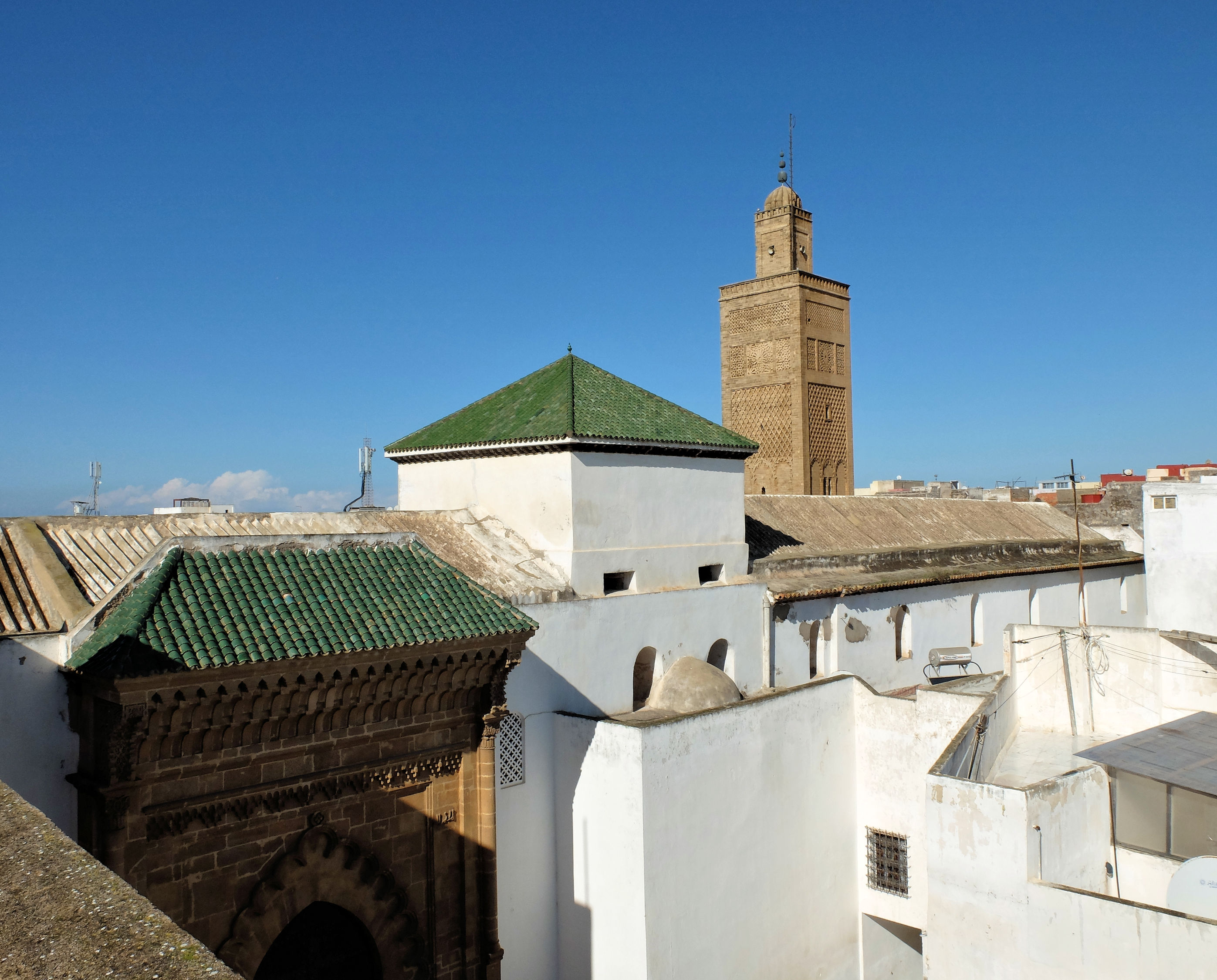
Great Mosque of Salé, located within the historic medina

The Arab historians al-Bakri and Ibn Hawqal mention the existence of a town along the Bou Regreg at an early era, but they may have been referring to Chellah (former Sala Colonia) rather than the present town of Salé. The town of Salé proper was probably founded in the 11th century by families from al-Andalus (present-day Spain and Portugal), most importantly the Banu 'Ashara. The latter family included learned jurists (faqihs) and judges (qadis) and they became the city's de facto rulers.

The Banu 'Ashara reportedly hosted Ibn Tumart, the founder of the Almohad movement, in their palace in 1121, while he was on his way to Marrakesh. They resisted the Almohad invasion under Ibn Tumart's successor, 'Abd al-Mu'min (r. 1130–1163). As a result, the latter destroyed the city walls, eliminated the Banu 'Ashara and seized their palace. When Abd al-Mu'min summoned the rulers of al-Andalus to pledge allegiance to him in 1151, he received them in this palace.

Later in the 12th century, when the Almohad caliph Yaqub al-Mansur (r. 1184–1199) founded Ribat al-Fath (present-day Rabat) across the river, Salé seems to have remained important and was used as a residence by the Almohad caliphs, who also made various improvements to the city. The current Great Mosque of Salé was built on the order of Yaqub al-Mansur in 1196, over the site of city's former main mosque whose roof had collapsed. (Its present-day form, however, is the result of 18th-century renovations.) Al-Mansur is also reported to have created the first bridge linking the city with Rabat across the river.

=== Marinid period ===
The gate of Bab el-Mrisa, dating to the 1270s during the early Marinid period of the city

In September 1260, Salé was raided and occupied by warriors sent in a fleet of ships by King Alfonso X of Castile. The Marinid sultan Abu Yusuf Yaqub ibn Abd Al-Haqq (r. 1258–1286) reconquered the town and afterwards helped to rebuild the city walls. The historic gate of Bab el-Mrisa was constructed at this time and remains a landmark of the city.

Marinid era Borj Adoumoue

During the Marinid period, the city's fortifications continued to be upgraded and a new protected harbour was built. The harbour, located on the south side of the city, was linked to the river by two channels, with Bab el-Mrisa and another monumental gate serving as water gates through which boats passed. The Marinids added new religious and charitable constructions, including the Madrasa of Abu al-Hasan, the Zawiya al-Nussak, and a maristan (hospital for the mentally ill).

In the 14th century, Ibn 'Ashir (d. 1362 or 1363), a Sufi mystic from al-Andalus, moved to Salé and attracted other Sufis to him, including Ibn Abbad al-Rundi. Ibn Ashir later became the patron saint of the city and his mausoleum dominates the large seaside cemetery of the medina.

=== Republic of Salé ===
The Kasbah of Gnaouas tower

In the 17th century, Salé became a haven for Barbary pirates, among them the Moriscos expelled from Spain turned corsairs, who formed an independent Republic of Salé. These were the Salé pirates (the well-known "Salé Rovers"). In 1609, Philip III decreed the expulsion of all Moriscos (people of Muslim or Moorish descent) from Spain. About 2000 of these refugees, originally from the town of Hornachos near Badajoz, Spain, settled around Salé and occupied the kasbah, attracting between 5000 and 14,000 other Moriscos to join them. Rabat and neighboring Salé united to form the Republic of Bou Regreg in 1627. They engaged in piracy, captured ships and sold their crews and sometimes passengers into slavery in the Arabic world. Despite the legendary reputation of the Salé corsairs, their ships were based across the river in Rabat, called "New Salé" by the English.

European powers took action to try to eliminate the threat from the Barbary Coast. In May 1628, the city of Salé was bombarded by Spain and, on 20 July 1629, it was bombarded by French Admiral Isaac de Razilly with a fleet composed of the ships Licorne, Saint-Louis, Griffon, Catherine, Hambourg, Sainte-Anne, Saint-Jean; his forces destroyed three corsair ships.

=== 20th century ===
Modern neighborhood, the city experienced rapid population growth after independence due to its proximity to Rabat

During the decades preceding the independence of Morocco, Salé was the stronghold of some "national movement" activists. The reading of the "Latif" (a politically charged prayer to God, read in mosques in loud unison) was launched in Salé and became popular in some cities of Morocco.

A petition against the so-called "Berber Dahir" (a decree that allowed some Berber-speaking areas of Morocco to continue using Berber law, as opposed to Sharia law) was given to Sultan Mohamed V and the Resident General of France. The petition and the "Latif" prayer led to the withdrawal and adjustment of the so-called "Berber Decree" of May 1930. The activists who opposed the "Berber Decree" apparently feared that the explicit recognition of the Berber customary law (a very secular-minded Berber tradition) would threaten the position of Islam and its Sharia law system. Others believed that opposing the French-engineered "Berber Decree" was a means to turn the tables against the French occupation of Morocco.

The widespread storm that was created by the "Berber Dahir" controversy created a somewhat popular Moroccan nationalist elite based in Salé and Fez; it had strong anti-Berber, anti-West, anti-secular, and pro Arab-Islamic inclinations. This period helped develop the political awareness and activism that would lead fourteen years later to the signing of the Manifesto of Independence of Morocco on 11 January 1944 by many "Slawi" activists and leaders. Salé has been deemed to have been the stronghold of the Moroccan left for many decades, where many leaders have resided.

Salé, like many other Moroccan cities, had its own mellah, where the Jewish community resided. Raphael Encaoua, a famous rabbi born in Salé is buried in the Jewish cemetery nearby.

== Subdivisions ==
The prefecture is divided administratively into the following:

Name	Geographic code	Type	Households	Population (2014)	Foreign population	Moroccan population	Notes
Bab Lamrissa	441.01.03.	Arrondissement	44636	174936	668	174266	
Bettana	441.01.05.	Arrondissement	22360	95291	386	94905	
Hssaine	441.01.06.	Arrondissement	51858	214540	470	214070	
Layayda	441.01.07.	Arrondissement	33522	153361	163	153198	
Sidi Bouknadel	441.01.08.	Municipality	4955	25255	9	25246	
Tabriquet	441.01.09.	Arrondissement	61101	252277	629	251648	
Shoul	441.03.01.	Rural commune	3925	19915	6	19909	in the Salé Suburbs Circle
Ameur	441.03.05.	Rural commune	8983	46590	16	46574	in the Salé Suburbs Circle

== Climate ==
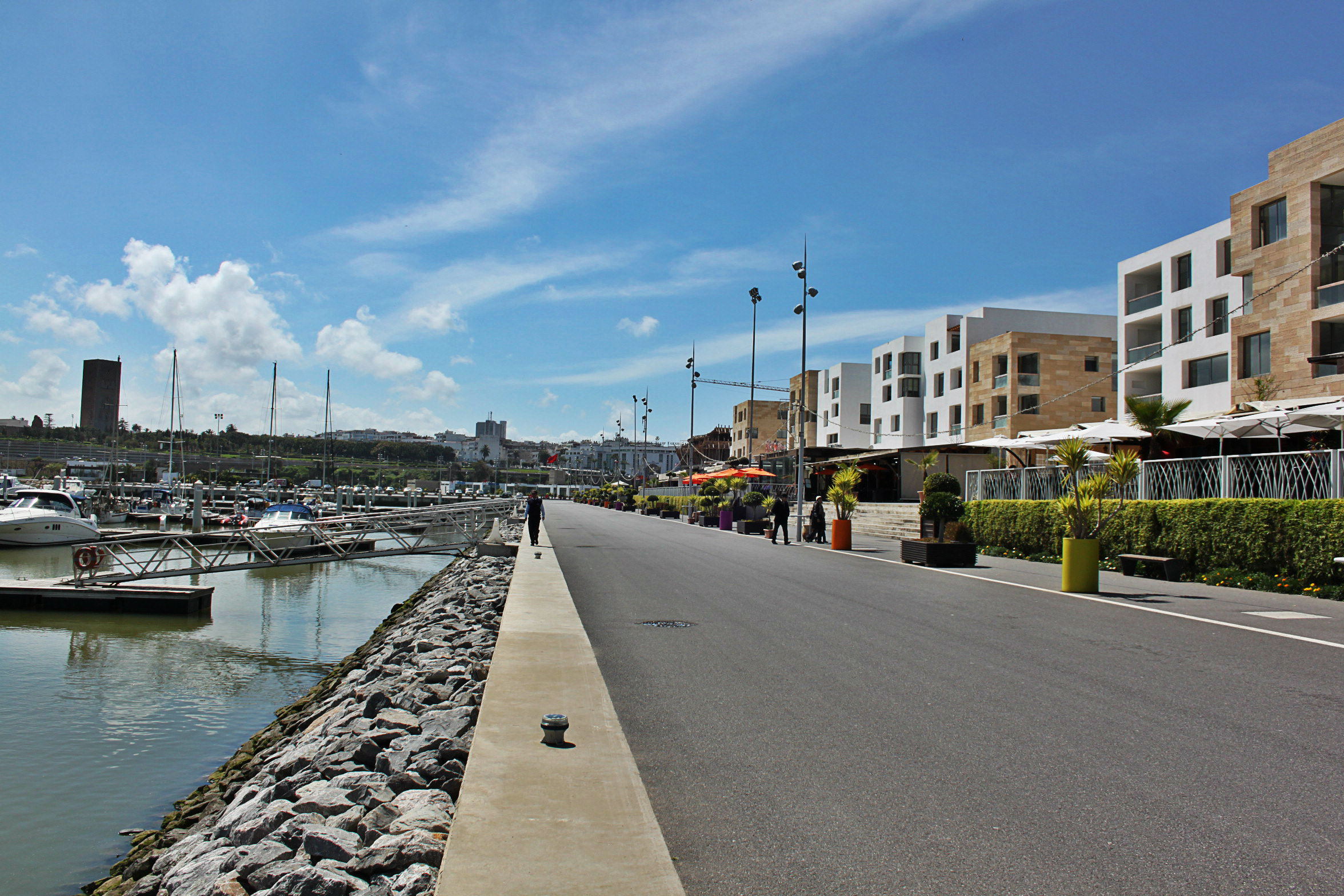
The Bouregreg Marina

Salé has a Mediterranean climate (Csa) with warm to hot dry summers and mild damp winters. Located along the Atlantic Ocean, Salé has a mild, temperate climate, shifting from cool in winter to warm days in the summer months. The nights are always cool (or cold in winter, it can reach Sub 0 °C (32 °F) sometimes), with daytime temperatures generally rising about 7 to 8 °C (45 to 46 °F). The winter highs typically reach only 17.2 °C (63.0 °F) in December–February. Summer daytime highs usually hover around 25 °C (77.0 °F), but may occasionally exceed 30 °C (86.0 °F), especially during heat waves. Summer nights are usually pleasant and cool, ranging between 11 °C (51.8 °F) and 19 °C (66.2 °F) and rarely exceeding 20 °C (68.0 °F). Rabat belongs to the sub-humid bioclimatic zone with an average annual precipitation of 560 mm.

Salé's climate resembles that of the southwest coast of the Iberian Peninsula and the coast of Southern California.

Climate data for Salé (Rabat–Salé Airport) 1991–2020, extremes 1943–present
Month	Jan	Feb	Mar	Apr	May	Jun	Jul	Aug	Sep	Oct	Nov	Dec	Year
Record high °C (°F)	30.0 (86.0)	31.0 (87.8)	35.8 (96.4)	37.6 (99.7)	43.0 (109.4)	43.7 (110.7)	47.2 (117.0)	45.8 (114.4)	42.3 (108.1)	38.7 (101.7)	35.1 (95.2)	30.0 (86.0)	47.2 (117.0)
Mean daily maximum °C (°F)	17.4 (63.3)	18.2 (64.8)	20.2 (68.4)	21.2 (70.2)	23.6 (74.5)	25.6 (78.1)	27.2 (81.0)	27.8 (82.0)	26.6 (79.9)	24.8 (76.6)	21.1 (70.0)	18.6 (65.5)	22.7 (72.9)
Daily mean °C (°F)	12.3 (54.1)	13.0 (55.4)	14.8 (58.6)	16.0 (60.8)	18.5 (65.3)	20.8 (69.4)	22.6 (72.7)	23.1 (73.6)	21.7 (71.1)	19.6 (67.3)	15.9 (60.6)	13.7 (56.7)	17.7 (63.9)
Mean daily minimum °C (°F)	7.2 (45.0)	7.8 (46.0)	9.5 (49.1)	10.9 (51.6)	13.3 (55.9)	15.9 (60.6)	17.9 (64.2)	18.3 (64.9)	16.8 (62.2)	14.4 (57.9)	10.8 (51.4)	8.8 (47.8)	12.6 (54.7)
Record low °C (°F)	−3.2 (26.2)	−2.6 (27.3)	−1.0 (30.2)	3.5 (38.3)	5.3 (41.5)	9.0 (48.2)	10.0 (50.0)	11.0 (51.8)	10.0 (50.0)	7.0 (44.6)	0.0 (32.0)	0.3 (32.5)	−3.2 (26.2)
Average precipitation mm (inches)	80.9 (3.19)	60.5 (2.38)	62.6 (2.46)	42.3 (1.67)	17.9 (0.70)	3.6 (0.14)	0.4 (0.02)	0.6 (0.02)	13.7 (0.54)	54.9 (2.16)	94.3 (3.71)	90.2 (3.55)	521.9 (20.55)
Average precipitation days (≥ 1.0 mm)	7.6	6.4	6.4	5.3	2.7	0.8	0.2	0.3	1.9	5.2	7.4	7.6	51.8
Average relative humidity (%)	82	82	80	78	77	78	78	79	80	79	80	83	80
Mean monthly sunshine hours	179.9	182.3	232.0	254.5	290.5	287.6	314.7	307.0	261.1	235.1	190.5	180.9	2,916.1
Source 1: NOAA (sun, 1961-1990)
Source 2: Deutscher Wetterdienst (humidity, 1973–1993), Meteo Climat (record highs and lows)

== Landmarks ==
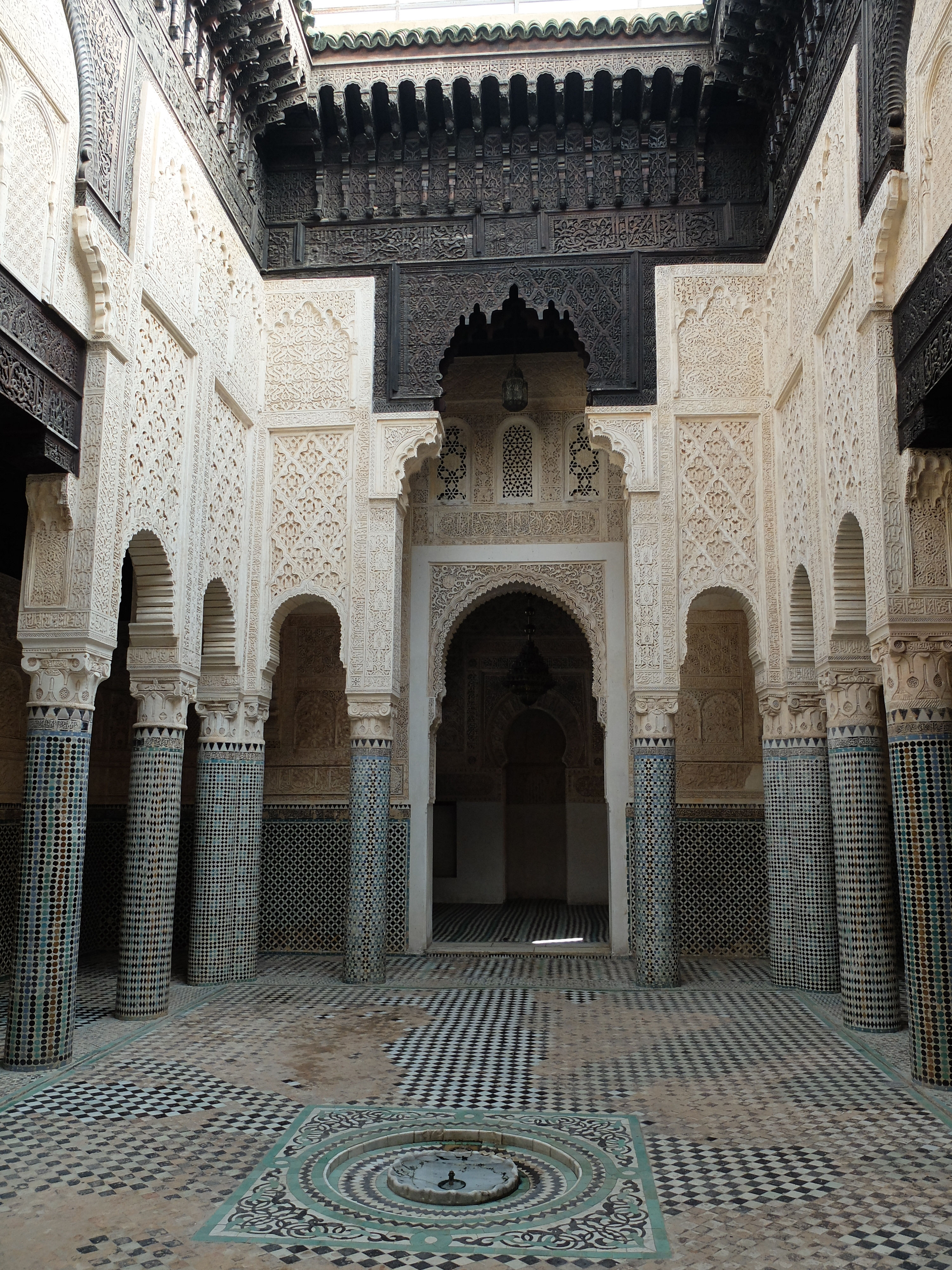
Madrasa of Abu al-Hasan Interior, 14th-century madrasa next to the Great Mosque

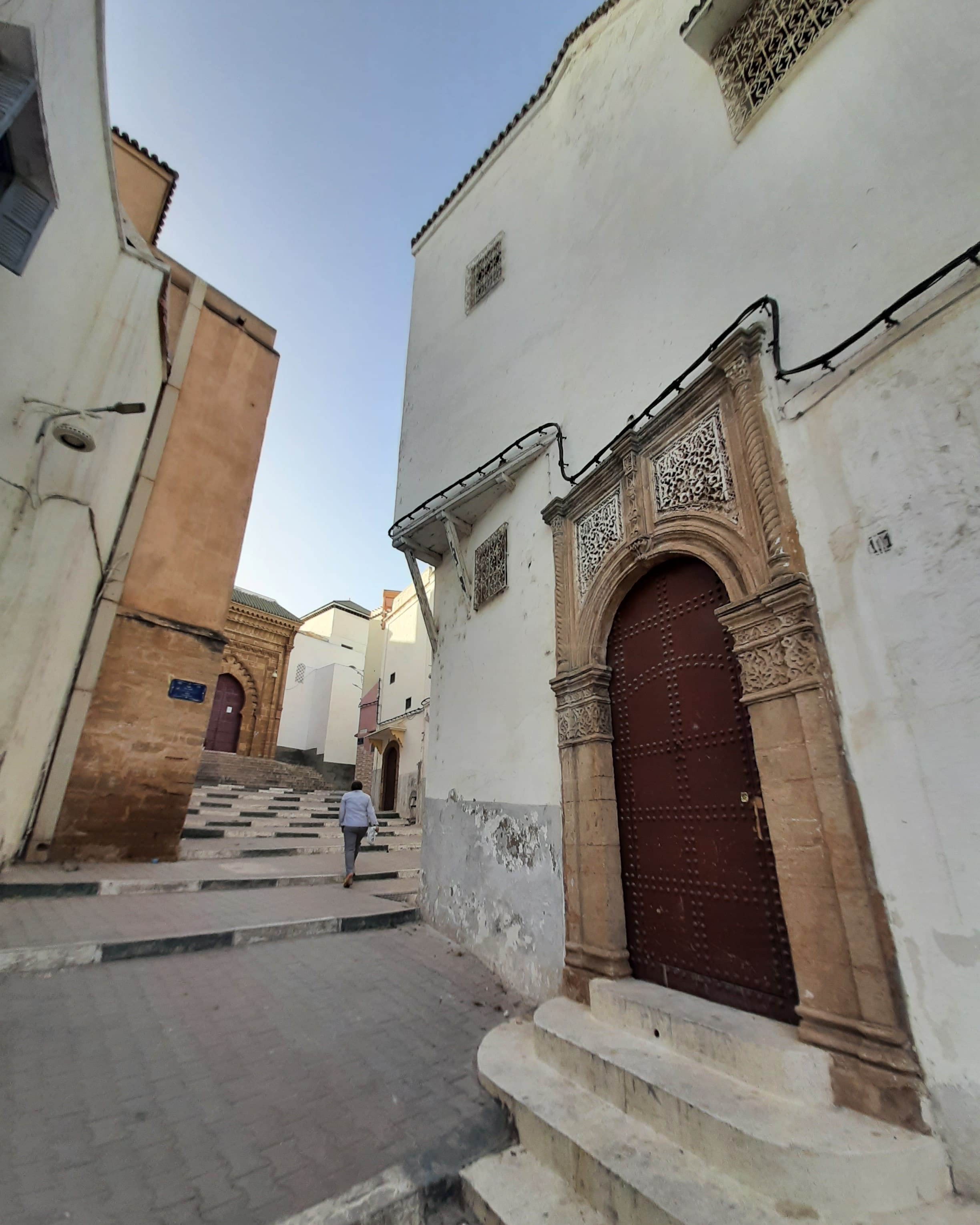
a Medina Alleyway

Sour El Kuas Aqueduct

Mohammed VI Tower, the tallest Building in Morocco

The historic old city (medina) of Salé occupies a large area near the mouth of the Bou Regreg river. It is enclosed by defensive walls pierced with several entrances, the most notable of which is Bab el-Mrisa ('Gate of the Little Port'), a monumental gate on the southeast side of the city, dating to the 1270s.

The religious center of the city is the Great Mosque, located in the western half of the medina. Next to the mosque is the Madrasa of Abu al-Hasan, a madrasa building dating to 1342, which is one of the architectural highlights of the city. A number of tombs and zawiyas are also located in the area near the Great Mosque and in the large seaside cemetery occupying the southwestern corner of the medina. The mausoleum complex of Sidi Abdallah ibn Hassun, one of the two patron saints of the city, is located just west of the mosque. The other patron saint of the city, Ibn Athir, is buried in a prominent mausoleum further west, near the shore.

One of the other historic landmarks of the city is the Funduq Askour, the former maristan (hospital). It was originally built by the Marinid sultan Abu Inan towards 1350. All that remains of the original building today is a highly decorated entrance portal.

A short distance east of the city walls is the Zawiya al-Nussak, originally built in 1356 by Abu Inan, most likely as a lodge for Sufis. By the 20th century it had fallen into ruin but it has recently been restored. Its most significant and well-preserved feature is a stone-carved entrance portal.

Another landmark outside the city walls is the 14th-century aqueduct built by the Marinid sultan Abu al-Hasan to improve the city's water supply. A preserved section roughly 2.5 kilometres (1.6 mi) long can be found to the north of the medina, at one point straddling the modern road that leads north to Kenitra.

Completed in 2015, Mohammed VI Tower is the tallest building in Morocco and one of the tallest buildings in Africa. The tower contains a luxury hotel, premium office space, high-end residences, commercial and cultural facilities, and a panoramic observation deck.

== Infrastructure ==
=== Transport ===
==== Air ====
Rabat-Salé Airport old terminal

Salé's main airport is Rabat–Salé Airport, which is located in Salé but also serves Rabat, the capital city of Morocco.

==== Trains ====
Salé is served by two principal railway stations run by the national rail service, the ONCF. These stations are Salé-Tabriquet and Salé-Ville.

Salé-Ville is the main inter-city station, from which trains run south to Rabat, Casablanca, Marrakesh and El Jadida, north to Tangier, or east to Meknes, Fez, Taza and Oujda.

==== Tram ====
Rabat-Salé tramway in Salé

The Rabat–Salé tramway was the first tramway network in Morocco and it connects Salé with Rabat across the river. It was opened on 11 May 2011 after a construction cost of 3.6 billion MAD. The network was constructed by Alstom Citadis and is operated by Transdev. As of February 2022, the network had two lines with a total length of 26.9 km (17 miles) and 43 stations. In 2023, an extension of the network was being planned and is due to be completed by 2028.

=== Water ===
Water supply and wastewater collection in Salé was irregular, with poorer and illegal housing units suffering the highest costs and most acute scarcities. Much of the city used to rely upon communal standpipes, which were often shut down, depriving some neighbourhoods of safe drinking water for indefinite periods of time. Nevertheless, Salé fared better than inland Moroccan locations, where water scarcity was even more acute. Improvements from the government, local businesses and the water distribution companies of Régie de distribution d'Eau & d'Électricité de Rabat-Salé (REDAL) as of 2010 have meant that this situation has improved drastically.

== Sports ==
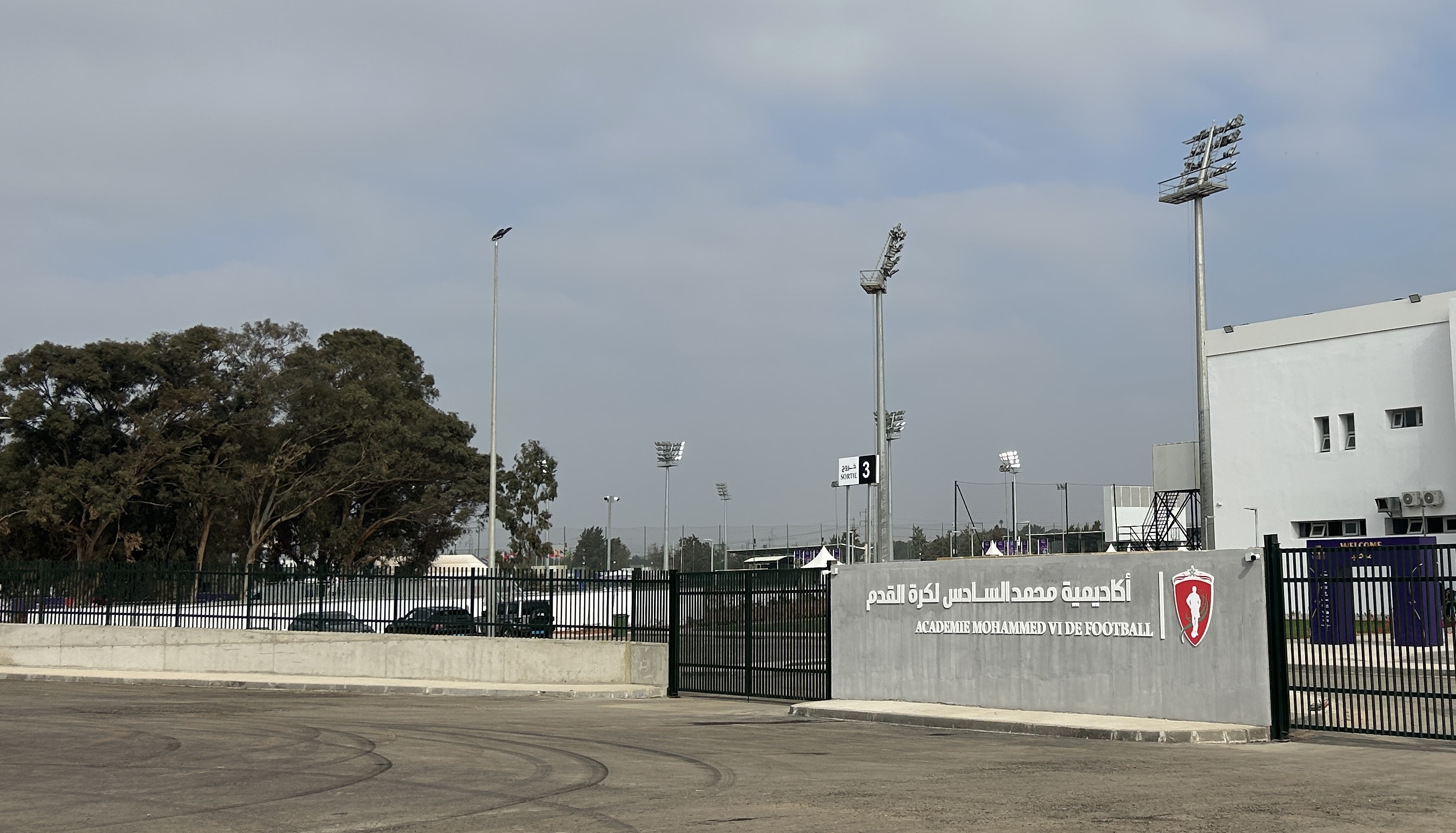
Entrance of Mohammed VI Football Academy

In December 2017, AS Salé became Africa's basketball club Champion. It was the first continental crown in the club's history. The football section of AS Salé is the football club of the city.

Salé Hosts Mohammed VI Football Academy, the country's premier Football academy.

== In popular culture ==
The film Black Hawk Down was partially filmed in Salé, in particular the wide angle aerial shots with helicopters flying down the coastline.

The character Robinson Crusoe, in the early part of Daniel Defoe's novel by the same name, spends time in captivity of the local pirates, the Salé Rovers, and at last sails off to liberty from the mouth of the Salé river - an adventure less well remembered than the protagonist's later sojourn on the desert island.

== Notable people ==
- Abdellah Taïa, writer
- Abdelwahed Radi, politician
- Abu Zakariya Yahya al-Wattasi, governor of Salé for the Marinids
- Ahmad ibn Khalid al-Nasiri, historian
- Ahmed al-Salawi, writer
- Amina Benkhadra, politician
- Amine Laâlou, athlete
- Chaim ibn Attar, world renowned biblical commentator, talmudist, and posek known for his work "Or HaChayim" on the Pentateuch
- Gnawi, rapper
- Hajj Ali Zniber, writer
- Hayat Lambarki, athlete
- Houcine Slaoui, musician
- Larbi Naji, footballer
- Léopold Justinard, French military man and Berber speaker who lived in the medina of Salé from 1937 to 1956
- El Mehdi Malki, judoka
- Merouane Zemmama, footballer
- Mohamed Amine Sbihi, politician
- Mohammed Zniber, writer and historian
- Nores (musician), Rapper
- Rajaâ Cherkaoui El Moursli, Professor of Nuclear Physics
- Raphael Ankawa, Chief Rabbi of Morocco and a noted commentator, talmudist, posek, and author
- Reda Rhalimi, basketball player
- Saad Hassar, politician
- Tarik Khbabez, kickboxer
- L'Morphine, rapper and songwriter

== Twin towns – sister cities ==
Salé is twinned with:

- Aryanah, Tunisia
- Beitunia, Palestine
- Gandiaye, Senegal
- Grand Yoff, Senegal
- Maroua, Cameroon
- Portalegre, Portugal

=== Partner cities ===
Salé also cooperates with:

- Alexandria, United States
- Sochi, Russia
- Tlaxcala, Mexico

== See also ==
- Bouknadel
- Le Bouregreg
