= National Route 19 (Morocco) =

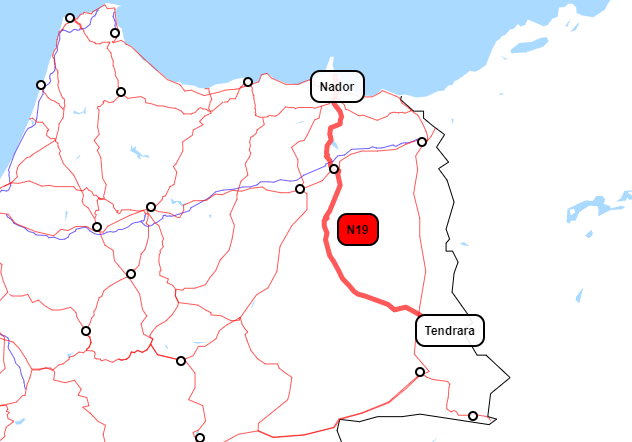

Major junctions
- South end: Tendrara
- North end: Melilla

Location
- Country: Morocco

Highway system
- Transport in Morocco

The National Route 19 (route nationale 19 or N19) is a road between Melilla and Tendrara
(via Beni Ansar, Nador, Selouane, Hassi Berkane, Taourirt and Debdou).

An extension of the east–west railway line in Morocco runs from Nador for 100 km to Taourirt. Most of the line follows the same route as the National road 19.
