= Nador Port =

Port Nador
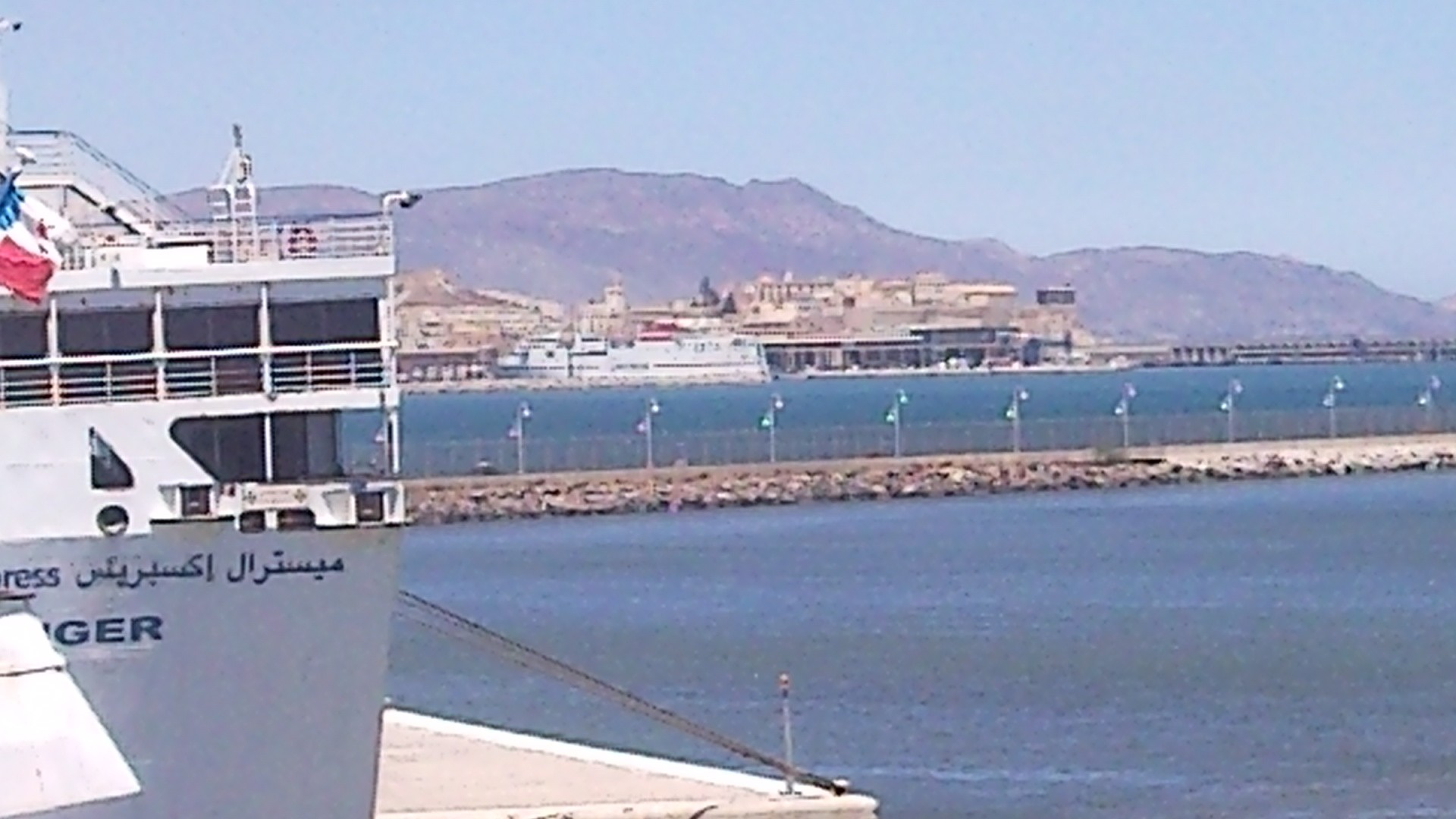
- Ferry in Nador with the border pier in the background and the port of Melilla in the background
- Interactive map of Port Nador

Location
- Country: Morocco
- Location: Beni Ensar / Aït Nsar; Nador (10 km.), Melilla
- Coordinates: 35°16′11″N 2°55′11″W
- UN/LOCODE: MANDR

Details
- Operated by: Societe d'Exploitation des Ports (SODEP)
- Type of Harbor: goods, fish, ferry and hydrocarbons
- No. of piers: 1000 m goods-pier, 600 m ferry, 100 m hydro-carbons
- Employees: 192

Statistics
- Annual cargo tonnage: 2.3 million tonnes
- Passenger traffic: 598.710
- Staff: 192

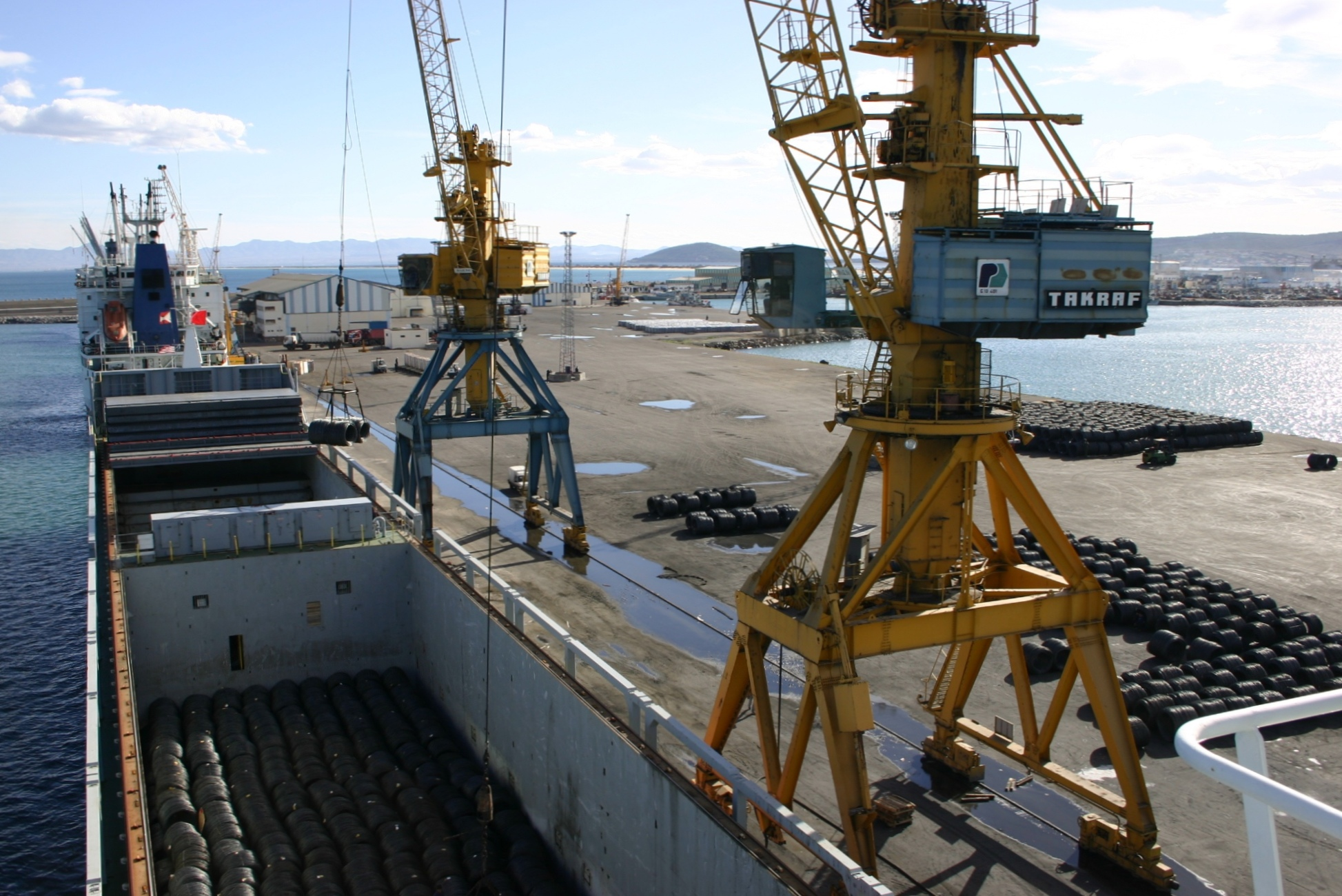
Loading steel wire coils at Terminal 2, Nador port

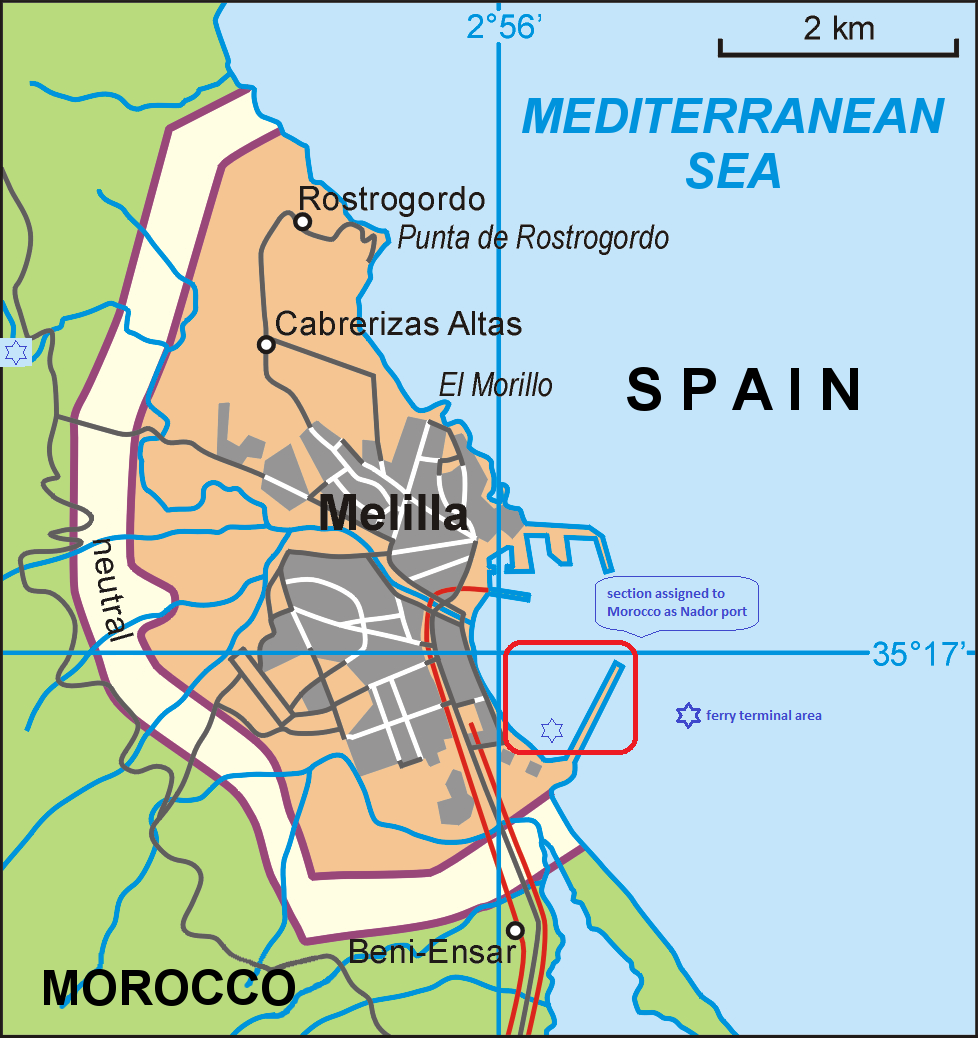
Map of Melilla showing Nador port

The port of Nador is a commercial port on the Mediterranean servicing the Rif area of Northern Morocco. The port is officially in Beni Ensar and shares its piers and entrance with the port of the Spanish enclave Melilla. It is a semi-artificial port using the Bou Areg Lagoon.

== Usage ==
The port is directly connected to the Spanish enclave Melilla: the Port of Melilla uses approximately 70% of the wet area, while Nador port uses the remaining 30% of the south-east area. The port is used as ferry/ro-ro port, dry-bulk and has facilities for hydro-carbons. The ro-ro facilities are used by ferry operators on the route to/from Spain.

In 1994 the operator FerriMaroc opened the line to the Port of Almeria. Before that date one could only sail to the area via Melilla or via the ferry-terminal in Al Hoceima.

== Facilities ==
The operator MarsaMaroc, who operate the main ports in Morocco, offer the following facilities in Nador Port The port can be divided in three main parts:

=== Terminal 2 ===
The main goods terminal has 700 metres (2,300 ft) of deep-water quays (13 metres [43 ft] deep) and another 300 metres (980 ft) of quays with a water depth of 10 metres (33 ft). This Terminal 2 is a bulk-goods terminal receiving bulk goods such as ore and billets for the nearby steel mill SONASID and is also used as a (small) fishing port. A total of 14.7 hectares (36 acres) of land area is available for storing or moving goods.

=== Passengers and vehicle piers ===
Nador Port is now an important ferry terminal for North-Eastern Morocco, with direct daily links to Spain (Almeria and Motril) and weekly connection to France (Sete)
For ferries operating to Europe the port offers 600-metre (2,000 ft) quays for Roll-on/roll-off ferries with elevated foot bridges for foot passengers to cross the car-traffic on different levels and thus not hindering each other at (dis)embarkation with also 13-metre (43 ft) depth.

=== Hydrocarbon port ===
Finally there is a 100-metre-long (330 ft) pier for reception of hydrocarbons with a water depth of 13 metres (43 ft).

== Train links ==
Since the Moroccan train operator ONCF opened the branch line Taourirt – Nador in 2009, the port also offers daily train connections to the rest of the country. The train stop Beni Ensar / Aït Nsar Port is the terminus for trains to Tanger and Casablanca via Fez. (see also: Nador railway stations)

== Connections ==
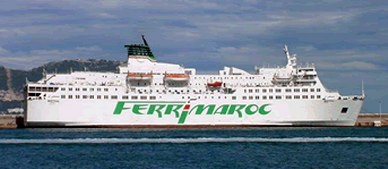
MS Mistral leaving Nador

=== Ferry links to mainland Europe ===
There are several ferry companies operating daily sailings to and from the Port of Almeria in Spain. The main operators are:

- Africa Morocco Link
- Trasmediterránea
- Grandi Navi Veloci (Nador to Sète in France)
- Balearia (Nador to Sète)

=== Rail and road connections in Morocco ===
The branch-line from Taourirt to Nador doesn't terminate in Nador itself but runs to Beni Ensar / Aït Nsar. Beni Ensar / Aït Nsar Port is the terminus station for the branch-line to Taourirt, where it connects to the East-West mainline towards Oujda in the east (no direct connection: change in Taorirt) or via Fez to Tanger or towards Rabat and Casablanca with further connections to Marrakesh in the west.

By road the National road N19 gives a direct connection to the city of Nador itself (8 miles) and beyond.

Nearby airports are Melilla Airport and Nador International Airport
