= Port of Almeria =

Coordinates: 36°50′1.25″N 02°28′0.84″W

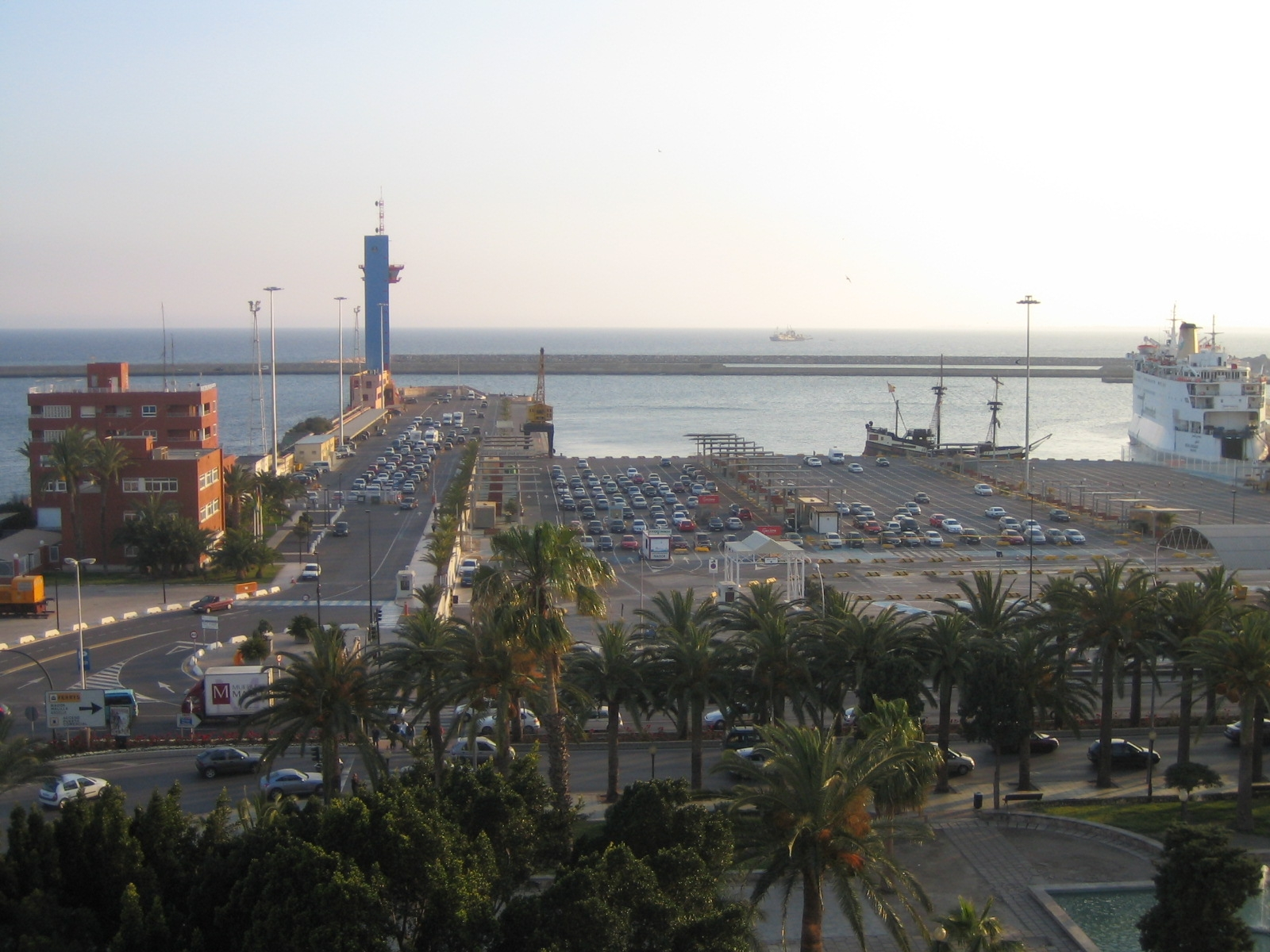
Ferry-port of Almería

The Port of Almería is a busy ferry-port in Almería, Spain.

== Location ==
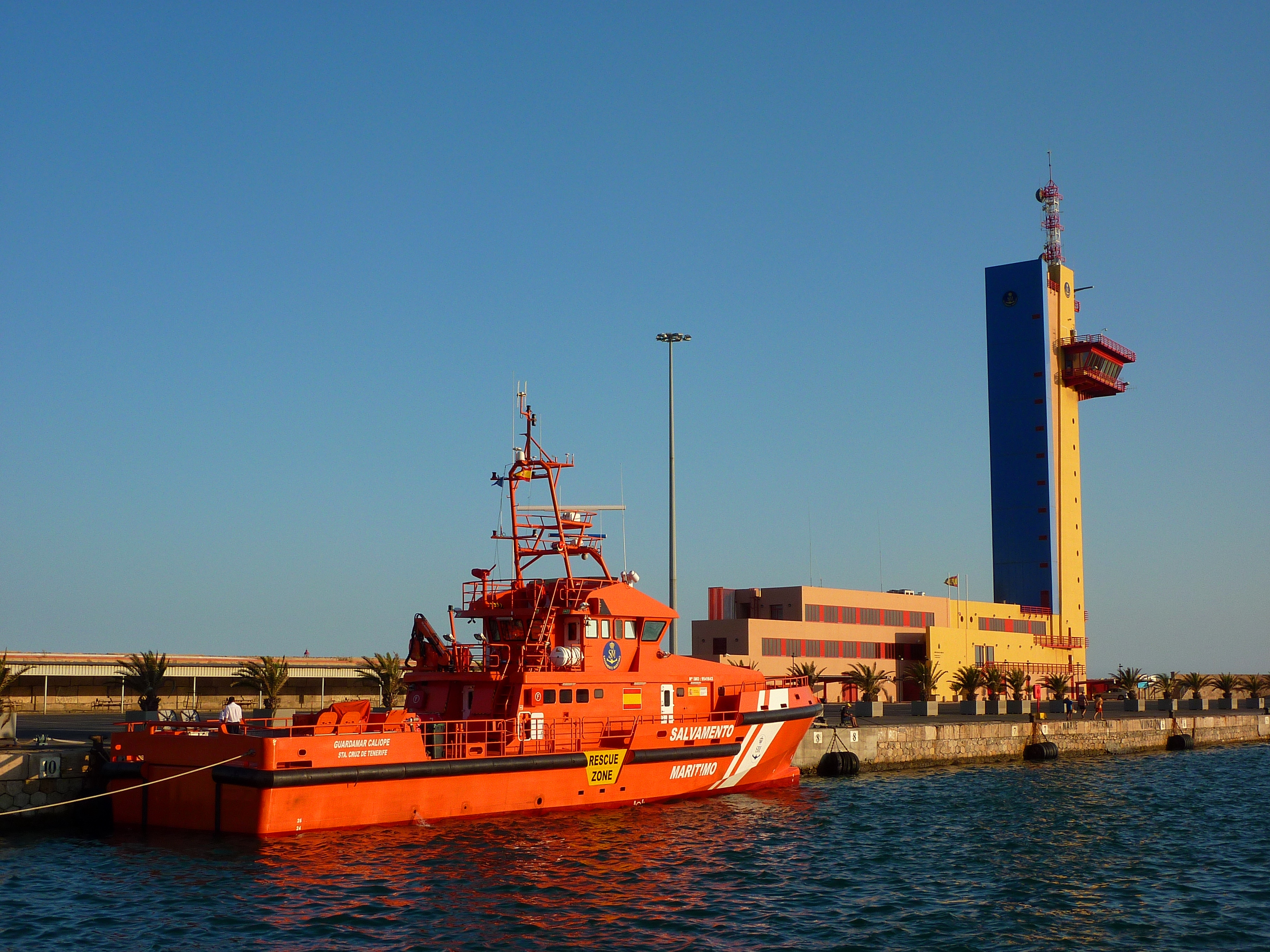
Guardamar Calíope (G-40) near the CCS in Almería, owned by the Sociedad de Salvamento y Seguridad Marítima.

The port is located in the center of the city, and serves primarily as a ferry terminal.

Crossings to destinations in North Africa take approximately 6 hours (normal ferry to Nador or Melilla). This is a much longer (and more expensive) crossing than the short crossings from Algeciras to Tangier, but it is more convenient for people traveling to the Rif area or Algeria.

Almería offers also a marina and a normal commercial port: it can receive cargo ships and cruise ships. The Royal Navy uses the port.

== Ferry terminal ==
The ferry terminal is busy. Moroccan nationals living in Western Europe use the crossings from Almería to visit relatives in the summer. The port offers several sailings each day to different destinations in northern Morocco and Algeria.

The port has a large waiting and sorting area for cars. As people have often traveled a very long distance, they tend to arrive hours before departure of the ship. To prevent overheating, most waiting areas for the cars are under a roof to protect the car and its passengers from the sun. The main terminal building has the offices of all the operating companies, where they sell the tickets or exchange your prepaid tickets for a boarding pass. The terminal building is open 24 hours a day and includes a café, a small shop/kiosk for refreshments, and a call-shop. Foot passengers can wait inside the terminal building for their ship.

Embarkation for foot passengers is situated on the first floor of the terminal building. After the Spanish immigration checks, a network of footbridges lead to the ship. These footbridges can reach each quay and via moving 'last metres', so that one can board the ships without having to touch the ground. The loading and unloading of cars does not interfere with the embarkation or disembarkation of foot passengers.

Outside the main terminal building, there are a few restaurants, offering passengers a simple menu or drinks. There is also a small supermarket that is open 24 hours and facilities like toilets and showers.

== Vessel Traffic Services ==
As Almería is a busy port where ships tend to constantly arrive and/or sail, all ships have to use a harbour pilot. On arrival, the pilot boards the ship when it arrives at the piers and leaves the ship when the first warp is fastened. On departure, the pilot leaves the ferry just before it passes the pier-head. A complicating factor for arriving ships is that all ferries have to swing round before docking: as the ships moor in Africa with the bow towards the key they have to dock in Almería with the stern facing the key or cars would have to turn on the ships or disembark driving backwards.

At the entrance of the port is a large tower for the officers of the Vessel Traffic Services (VTS). The tower provides the staff with a good view over the harbour entrance and the entire port area. The VTS is fitted with radar on top of the tower.

== Operators and destinations ==
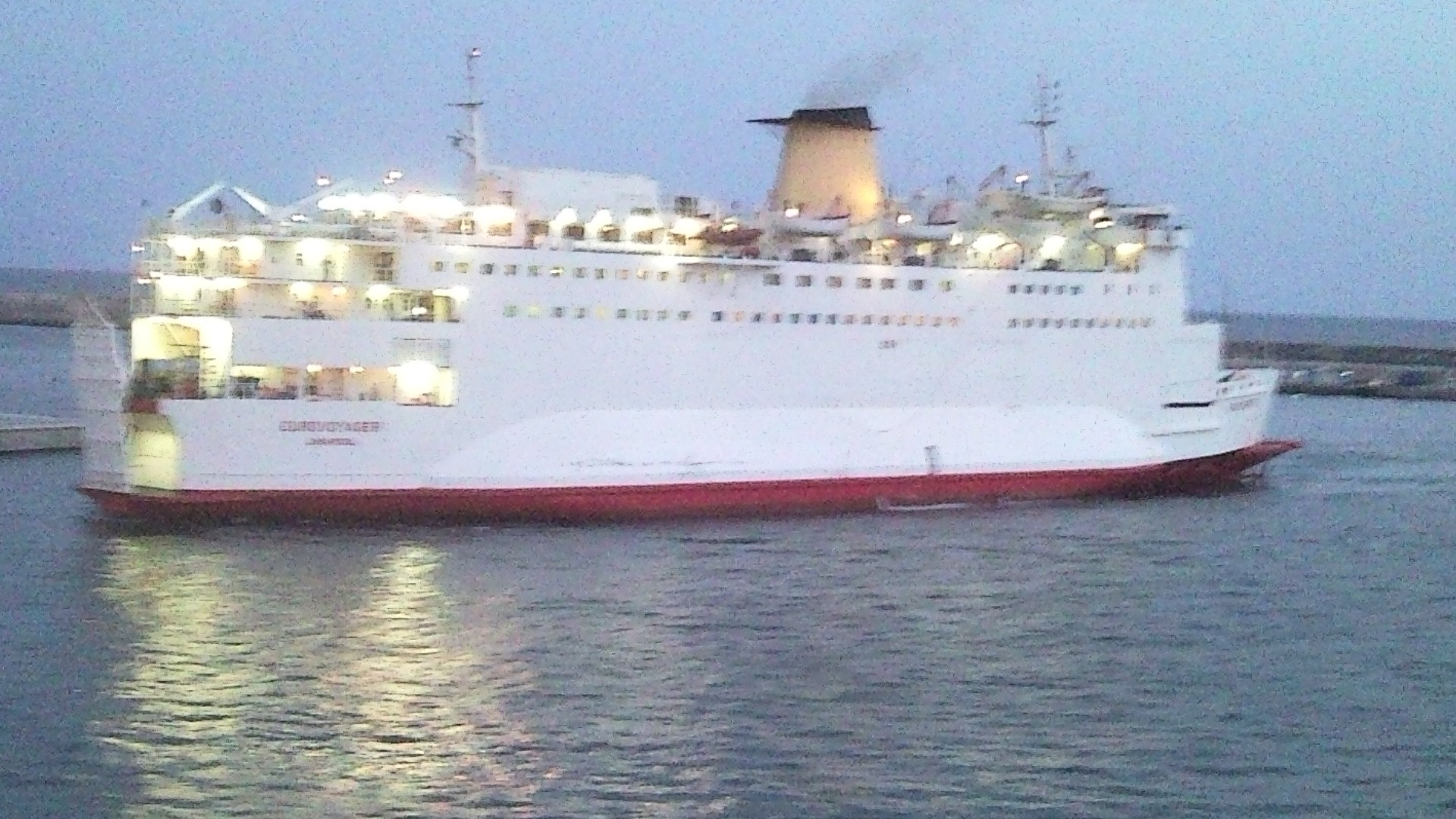
MV Eurovoyager arrives at dusk

Several shipping companies offer frequent connections with North Africa.

Morocco

- Nador: FerriMaroc and Acciona Trasmediterránea
- Al Hoceima: Comanav and Comarit

Algeria

- Ghazaouet: SNCM
- Oran: SNCM

Spain

- Melilla - Acciona Trasmediterranea
