= List of stock used by ONCF =

This is an incomplete list of locomotives and multiple units used by the ONCF.

== Electric locomotives ==
Class	Constructed	Quantity delivered	Still in use	Maximum speed	Power	Tractive effort	Comments	Picture	References
E 200	1932	7	0	75 km/h	1210 kW		Originally CFM. Similar to SNCF Class BB 4200		
E 501	1926	6	0	90 km/h	680 kW		Originally CFM. Similar to SNCF Class BB 4500		
E 507	1928	4	0	60 km/h	680 kW		Originally CFM. Similar to SNCF class 4500. Freight version for phosphates trains Oued Zem - Casablanca		
E 600	1929	16	0	75/90 km/h	1160 kW		Originally CFM. Similar to SNCF Class BB 4100		
E 700	1948	14	0	80/115 km/h	1220 kW	152 kN	Originally CFM. Similar to SNCF Class BB 8100. Used for freight trains.		
E 800	1959	7	0	90 km/h	3200 kW		Originally CFM. Similar to SNCF Class CC 7100. Used for freight trains.		
E 900	1969	7	0	75/125 km/h	2427 kW		(Note: This type is used for passenger trains, but does not supply head end power. Passenger trains always have an additional generator van for train power supply.) Similar to SNCF Class CC 6500 and JŽ class 363.		
E 1000	1975–1976	23	0	125 km/h	3000 kW	412 kN	Similar to PKP class ET22		
E 1100	1977	22		100 km/h	2850 kW	320 kN	Built by Hitachi. Mainly used for freight trains		
E 1200	1982	8		100 km/h	2850 kW	320 kN	Built by Hitachi. Mainly used for freight trains		
E 1250	1984	12		160 km/h	3900 kW	155 kN	Built by Hitachi. Used for passenger trains.		
E 1300	1992	18		160 km/h	4000 kW	275 kN	Similar to SNCF Class BB 7200. Used for passenger trains.		
E 1350	1999	9		100 km/h	4000 kW	330 kN	Similar to E 1300 but with lower gear ratio for phosphate trains		
E 1400	2009–2010	20		160 km/h	5500 kW	320 kN	Prima II, used for freight and passenger trains with head-end power supply. For 3 kV DC operation but designed for conversion for 25 kV AC		
E 1450	2019	30		160 km/h	5500 kW		Prima M4, fitted with ETCS		

== Diesel locomotives ==
Class	Constructed	Quantity delivered	Still in use	Maximum speed	Power	Tractive effort	Comments	Picture	References
DF 100	1969	14		80/135 km/h (Note: The SNCF CC 72000 have switchable gear ratios, a "slow" setting with high tractive effort for freight operation and a "fast" setting with low tractive effort for passenger trains)	2250 kW	360/216 kN	Similar to SNCF Class CC 72000. Originally used for phosphates trains on the Benguerir - Safi line, now in passenger service.		
DF 115	1967	6		85/160 resp. 85/140 km/h	2650 kW	189 kN	Former SNCF Fret class CC 72000, bought in 2006.		
DG 200	1973	37		90 km/h	589 kW	219 kN	Similar to PKP SM/SP42		
DH 350	1974	18			2429 kW		Freight locomotive by General Motors		
DH 370	1974	4			2429 kW		Passenger version of the DH 350.		
DI 500	1982	18		85 km/h	736 kW				
DK 550	1982	11			1472 kW		Variant of the DH 350 for heavy freight trains		
DL 5	1990	12			263 kW		Light shunter		
DM 600	1992	19		100 km/h	817 kW		Newer version of the DI 500		
DO 700	2026	5		120 km/h	2000 kW	423 kN	Built by CRRC Ziyang, type AC30		

== Electric multiple units ==
Class	Constructed	Quantity delivered	Still in use	Maximum speed	Power	Comments	Picture	References
ZM	1984–1995	14		160 km/h	1415 kW	Three cars, based on SNCB AM80		
Z2M	2006–2007	24		160 km/h	900 kW	Four cars, double-deck, based on FS TAF		
