= Nador railway stations =

Two railway-stations in Nador, Morocco

Coordinates: 35°11′02″N 2°55′40″W

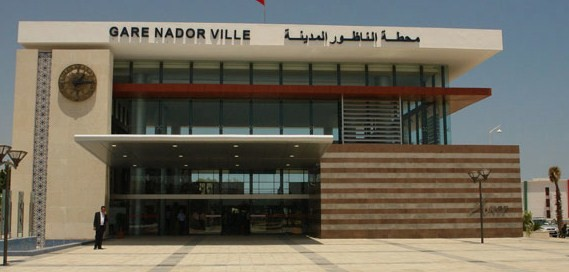
Gare Nador Ville main entrance

The city of Nador in Morocco has two railway-stations: Nador Ville and Nador South. Further on the line there is also a station at Beni Ansar and the terminal Beni Ansar Port, which is generally indicated as Nador Port station. As with all railway stations in Morocco, these stations are operated by ONCF, Morocco's national railway operator.

Nador Ville railway station is the main station and serves the single track line through the city. The station was opened on 10 July 2009 by King Mohammed VI, together with the town's other station Nador South and the line to Tawrirt. Within the city limits of Nador, the track runs through a tunnel under the main south–north road into Nador. Between 2006 and the completion of the line in 2009, the major construction works which were carried out in the city caused disruption to traffic along one of the major through-roads of this busy city.

The railway line doesn't terminate in Nador (even when the name of the line is Taourirt-Nador) but past Nador Ville there are two more stations: Beni Ansar (Ait Nsar) Ville and Beni Ansar Port. The tunnel ends at the site of Nador Ville station - and continues deepened within Nador being at street-level in Beni Ansar and Beni Ansar Port which is the terminus of the line and is often called Gare Nador Port as the port in Beni Ansar is the Port of Nador.

== Construction ==
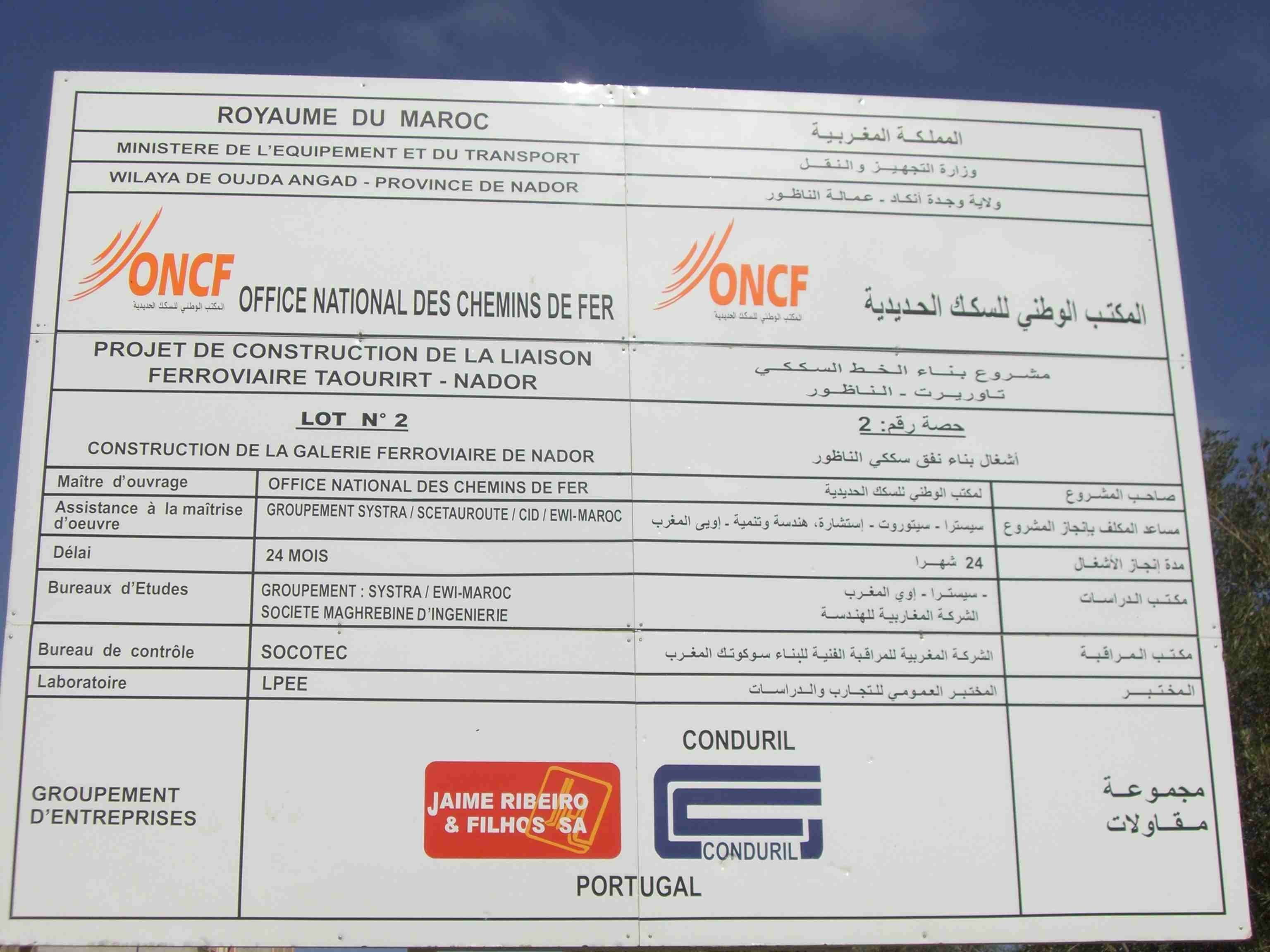
Sign regarding building railway and tunnels for it through Nador

The construction of the 117 kilometer track to Taourirt cost 1.776 million dirham (approximately €180 million). This averages to 15 MDh per kilometer. The line is relatively expensive because it has to run from the 400m-above-sea-level in the Rif mountains to Nador, which is at sea level. The construction of the underground track and station platforms also required more money than a ground-level track.

== Connection to the core network ==
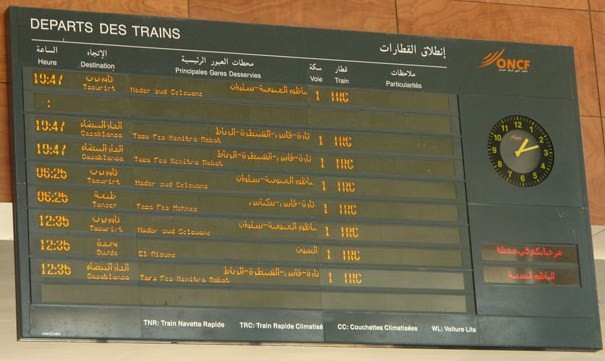
Sign showing daily departures from Nador Ville

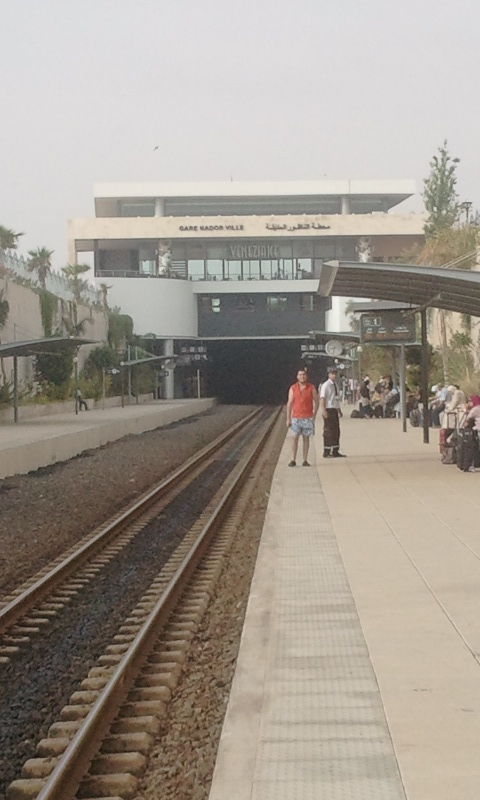
Platform 1 (plat 2 has no tracks) looking South

The Nador line connects to the core rail network at Taourirt. At this point the line connects to the major east–west line that runs from Oujda via Fez and Meknes to the capital, Rabat, and the commercial capital, Casablanca. Every day there are 4 trains towards and from Nador. One starts and one terminates in Taorirt - where you can transfer to/from the west–east train Fez-Oujda. One terminates in Fez, one in Casablanca (via Fez and Rabat) and one in Tanger (via Fez).

=== Stations on Nador branch line ===
The branch-line to/from Nador connects to the main east–west line near Taourirt. As most of the track between Oujda and Fez there is only one track; only at stations there can be more tracks to allow trains passing (Nador Ville only has one track: there is a 2nd platform, but no rails laid yet). The single track is not electrified: trains on this route change in Fez from electric to diesel-powered locomotives.

The stations are:

- Beni Ansar / Aït Nsar or Nador Port (terminus)
- Beni Ansar / Aït Nsar Ville
- Nador Ville
- Nador South
- Selouane
- Hassi Berkane

There are some additional stops on the route but they are not in a city or even village: these stops offer train connections for the rural villages in the area.

The line goes through the Rif mountains: Nador lies at sea-level while Taourirt is really in the mountains.

=== Timetable Nador trains ===
Departure Nador	Taorirt	Fes	Casablanca	Tanger
08:43	10:27	14:40	18:45	n/a
12:28	14:12	18:30	22:45	n/a
17:43 ^{(†)}	-	01:00	-	07:00
19:43 ^{(†)}	-	01:00	06:15	n/a
Departure; Casablanca	Tanger	Fez	Taorirt	Arrivee; Nador
19:45 ^{(†)}	-	00:15	-	06:00
-	21:35 ^{(†)}	02:30	07:45	09:32
06:15	-	10:35	15:20	17:03
13:15	-	17:15	21:30	23:13

Notes: (†): Night-train with (double) sleep-compartments.

The journey to Taourirt takes just over an hour, but as the train changes direction there (by moving the locomotive to the other end of the train) the departure from Taourirt is approximately 2 hours after departing Nador. Between Nador and Taourirt there are several stops such as Selouane, Hassi Berkane and Oulad Babou. Most trains continue to Fez or Casablanca (station Casablanca Voyageurs, one daily train terminates in Taorirt and requiring a change to a train from Oujda to continue further to the west toward Casa-Voyageurs) which takes approximately 12 hours.

Travelers to Nador can arrive at approximately 08:15, 17:00 or 22:15.
