= Port of Melilla =

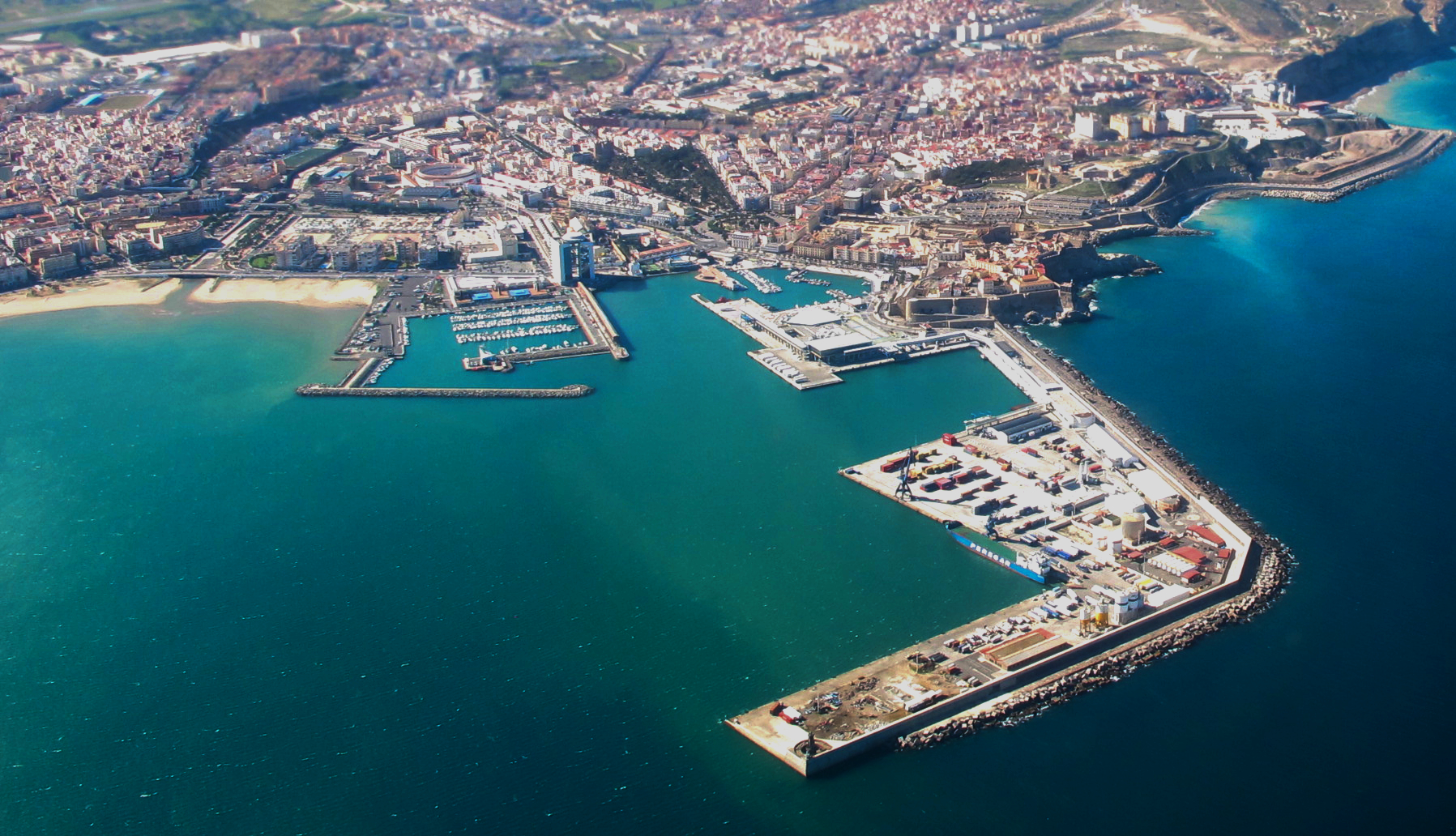
- Click on the map for a fullscreen view
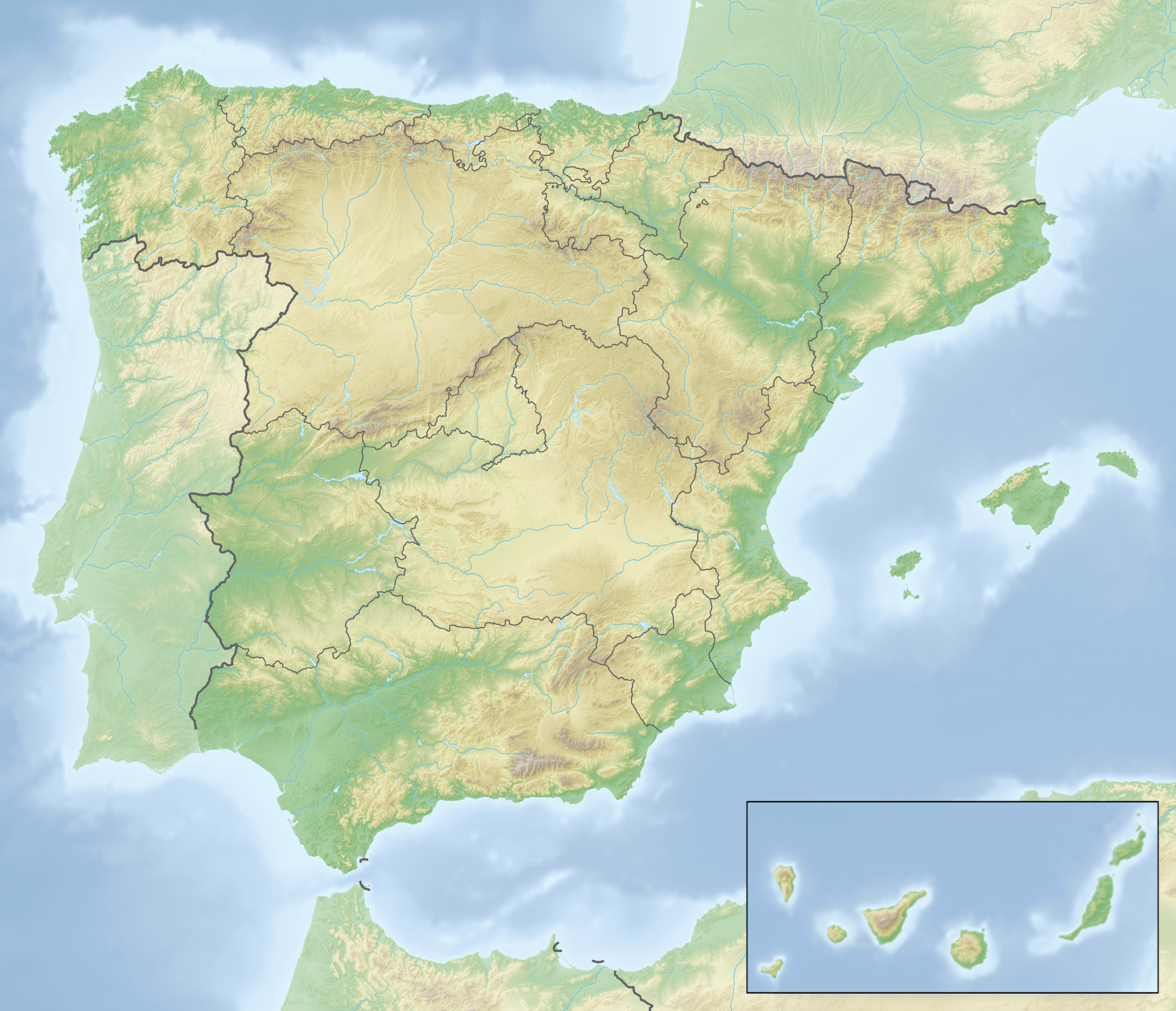
- Port of Melilla (Spain)

Location
- Country: Spain
- Location: Melilla
- Coordinates: 35.291791°N 2.932527°W
- UN/LOCODE: ESMLN

Details
- Operated by: Port Authority of Melilla
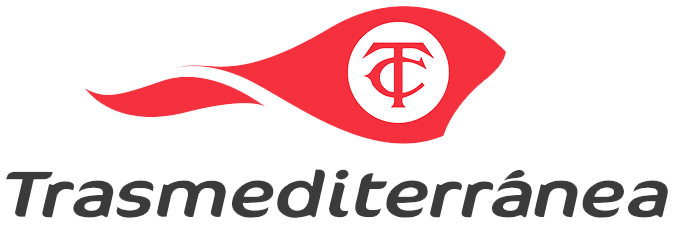
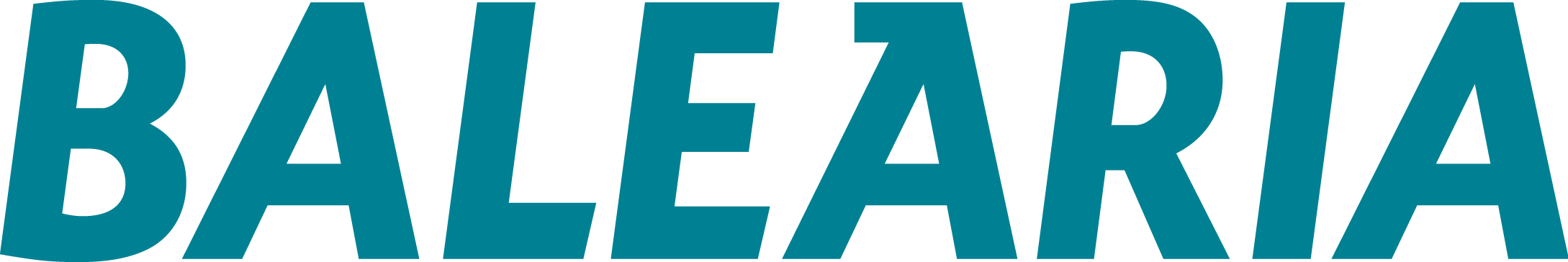
- Shipping Companies
- Destinations: (Andalusia) Málaga (Andalusia) Almería (Andalusia) Motril
- Public transportation: Road; TAXI; Melilla VTC

Statistics
- Vessel arrivals: ▲5.025 (+200%)
- Annual cargo tonnage: ▼566.365 (-5,70%)
- Passenger traffic: ▲641.263 (140,55%)

The Port of Melilla is a cargo, fishing, and passenger port and marina located in Melilla, a Spanish autonomous city off the coast of North Africa.

== History ==
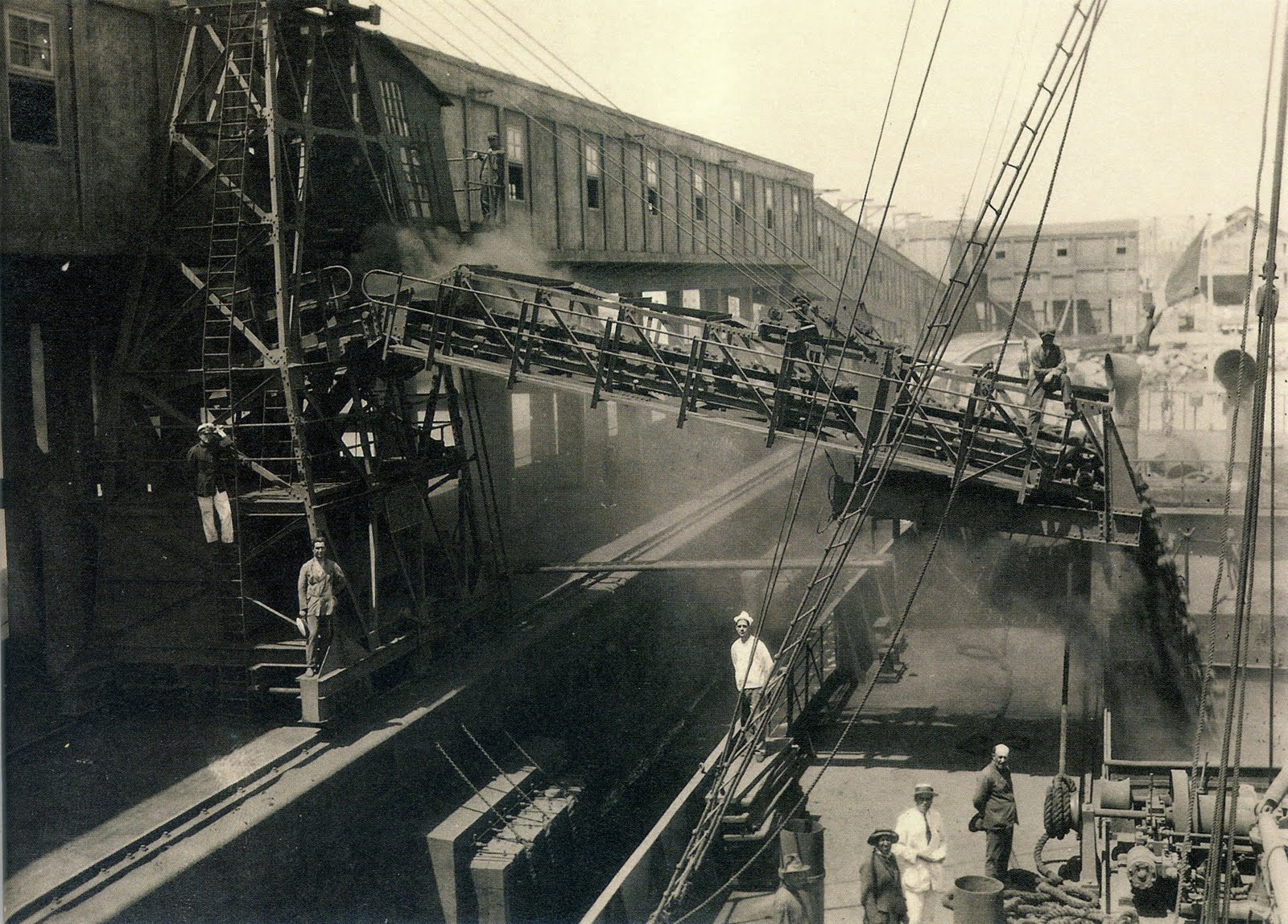
Loading of iron in the port of Melilla

A port existed in Phoenician and Punic Russadir that continued its activity under Roman rule after the fall of Carthage. During the Middle Ages the port presumably played a part in the interchange of gold, ivory, slaves and cereals imported by the Caliphate of Córdoba in exchange for perfume, leather, silk and fabric.

During the time of the Spanish protectorate in Morocco, the iron ore mined from the hinterland was loaded in the port of Melilla by the Compañía Española de Minas del Rif (CEMR).

== Description ==
Map of the port

It is managed by the port authority of the same name. It competes against the neighbouring port of Beni Ansar (Nador). By 2008, the port moved around 830,000 tonnes of cargo and 511,000 passengers.

The port has a ferry connection to Málaga, Motril and Almería.
