= Taourirt, Morocco =

Taourirt تاوريرت (Arabic) ⵜⴰⵡⵔⵉⵔⵜ (Standard Moroccan Tamazight)
- City
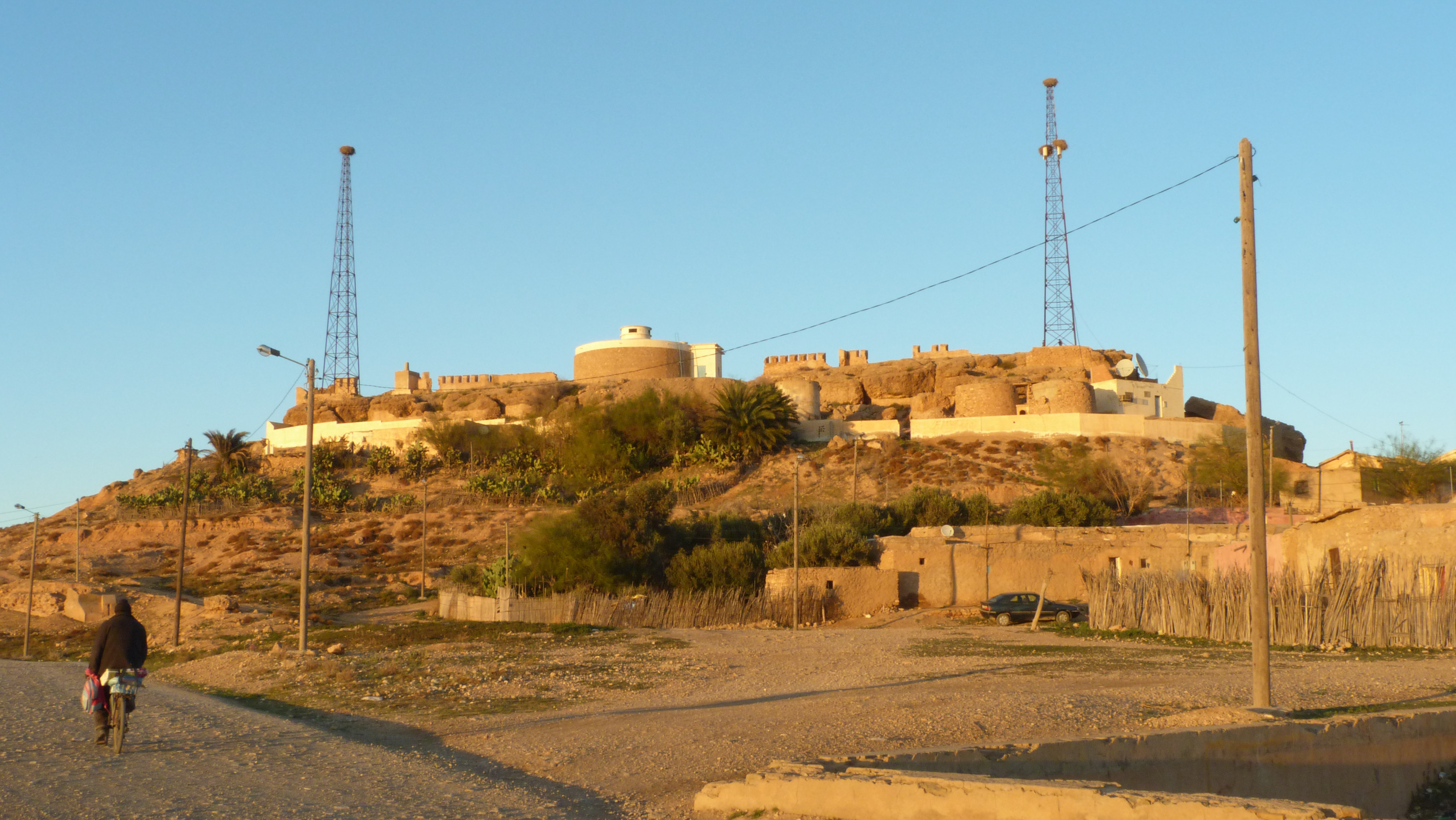
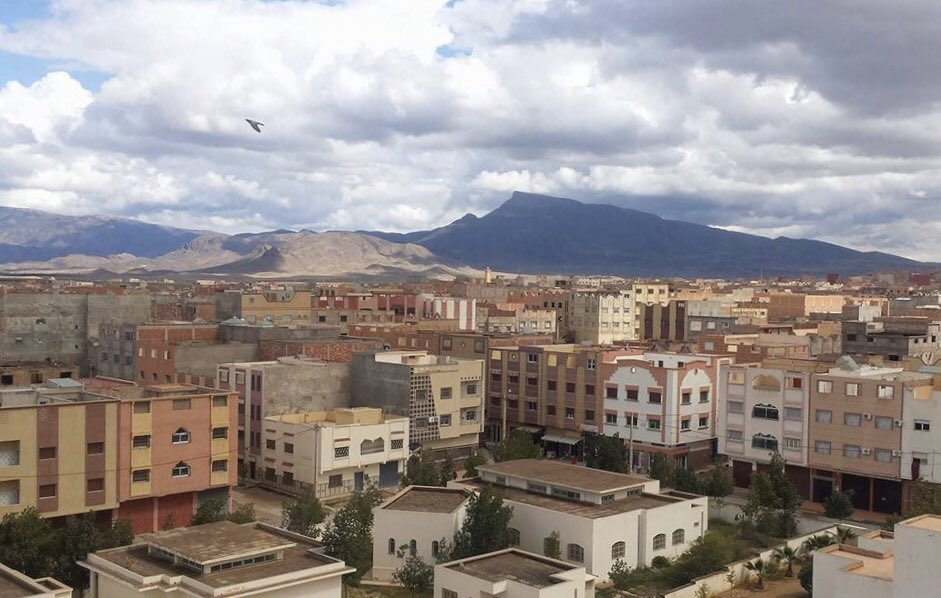
- Interactive map of Taourirt
- Coordinates: 34°25′1″N 2°53′6″W
- Country: Morocco
- Region: Oriental
- Province: Taourirt

Population (2014)
  - Total: 103,398
- Time zone: UTC+0 (GMT)

Taourirt (Note: Arabic: تاوريرت Standard Moroccan Tamazight: ⵜⴰⵡⵔⵉⵔⵜ) is the capital, namesake and largest city of Taourirt Province in northern Morocco. It is located in the Oriental region about 100 km west to the city of Oujda.

The city is important as a transport link: the main east-west railway from Casablanca - Rabat - Fez in the west to Oujda in the east runs through Taourirt. Also bus lines running from several cities in the Nador province (including the city of Nador) make a stop in the city.

The new branch line of the Moroccan railways running from Taourirt to Nador opened in 2009. This line runs alongside the existing road, through the mountains, to Nador.

Taourirt is also known because of its ancient Kasbah. The name of the City means hill in Tamazight.

== Notable people ==
- Moha El Yaagoubi – former international footballer
- Abdelaziz Meziane Belfkih – Moroccan politician

== Gallery ==
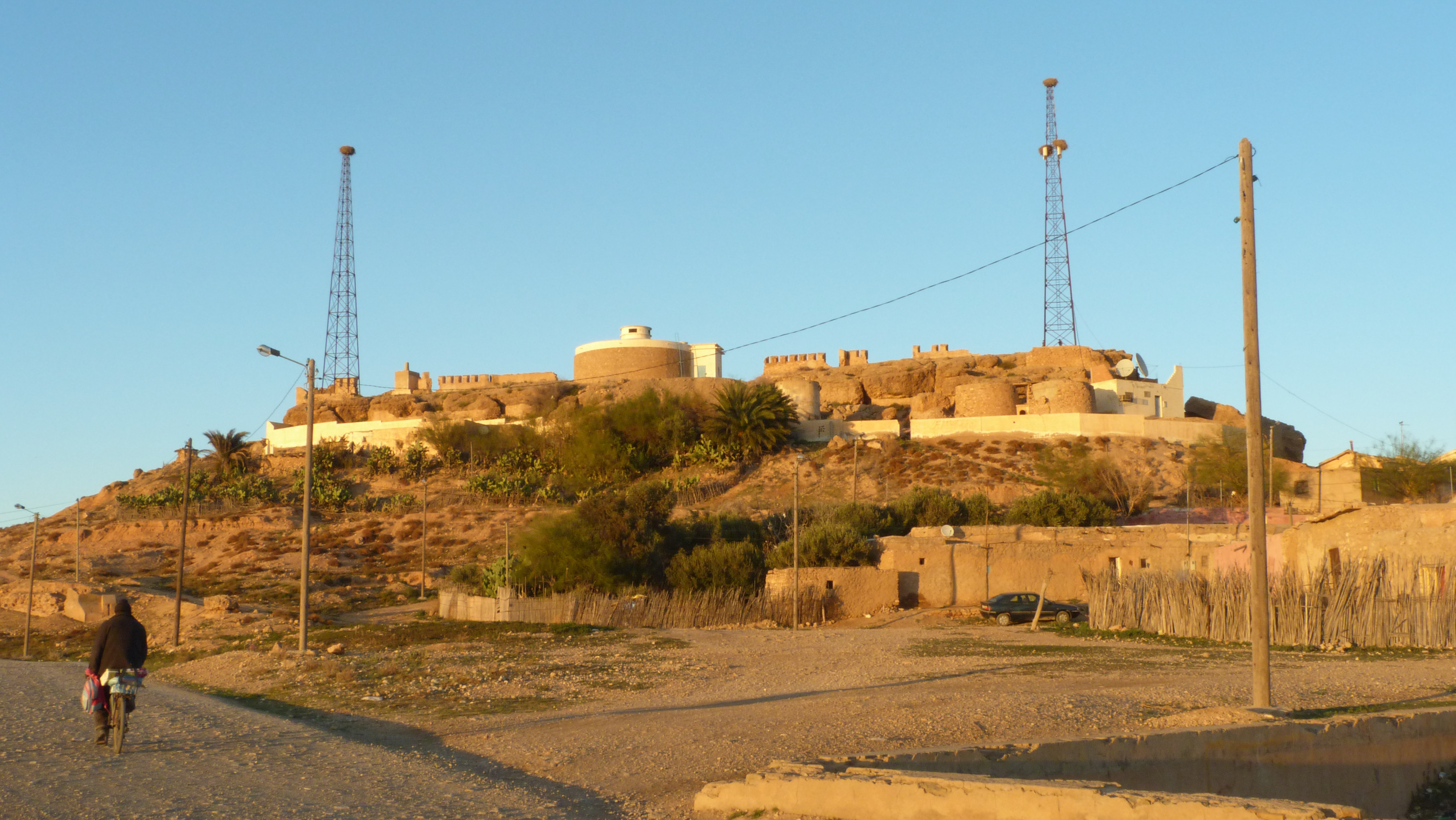
The Kasbah in Taourirt.

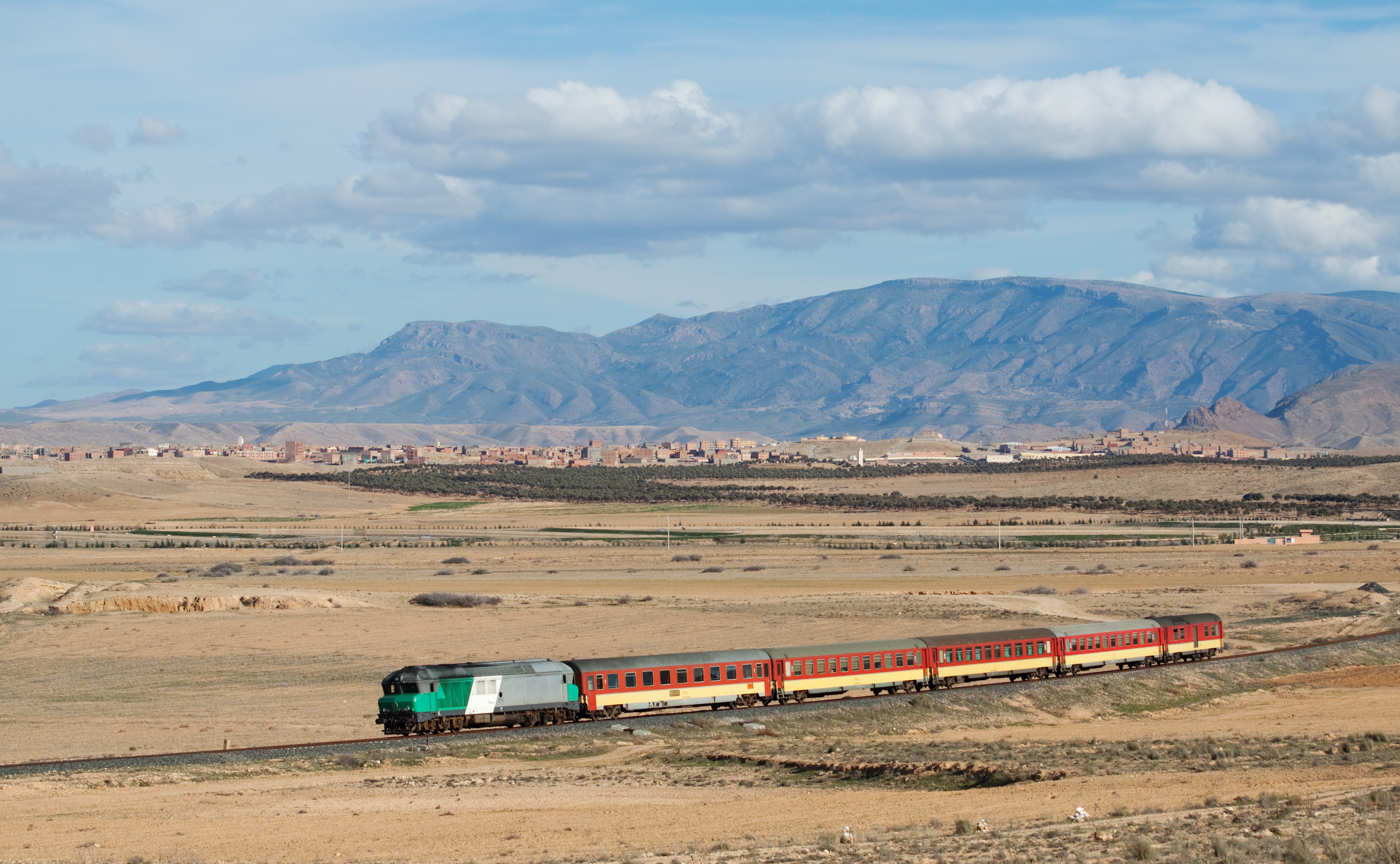
The railway near Taourirt.

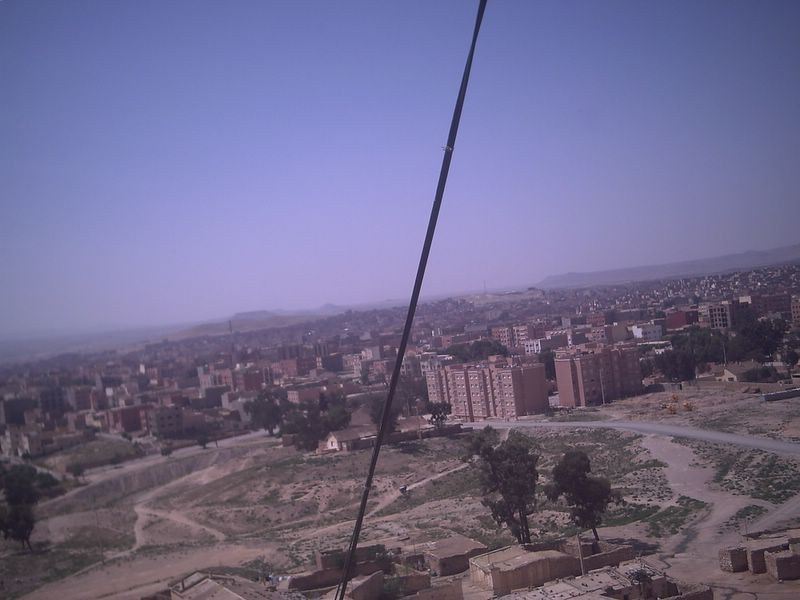
Aerial photo of the city.

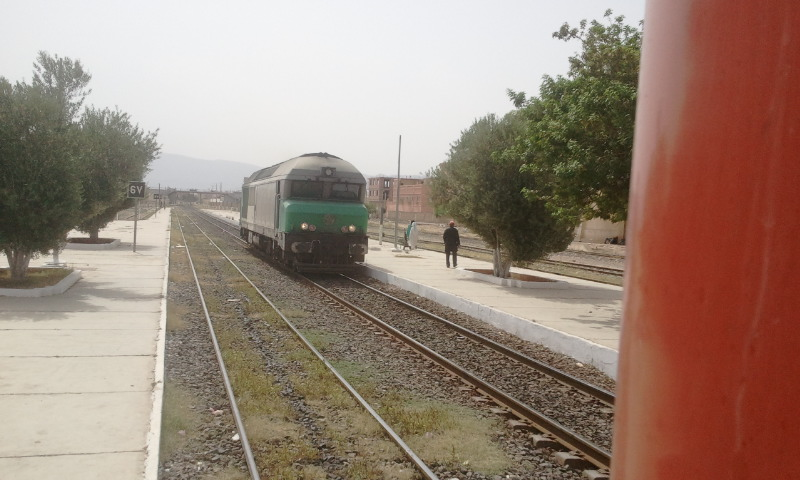
Loc moved to other end of train for the Nador-Fes train
