= Beni Ansar =

Beni Ansar ⴱⵏⵉ ⵏⵚⴰⵔ بْني نصار
- Town
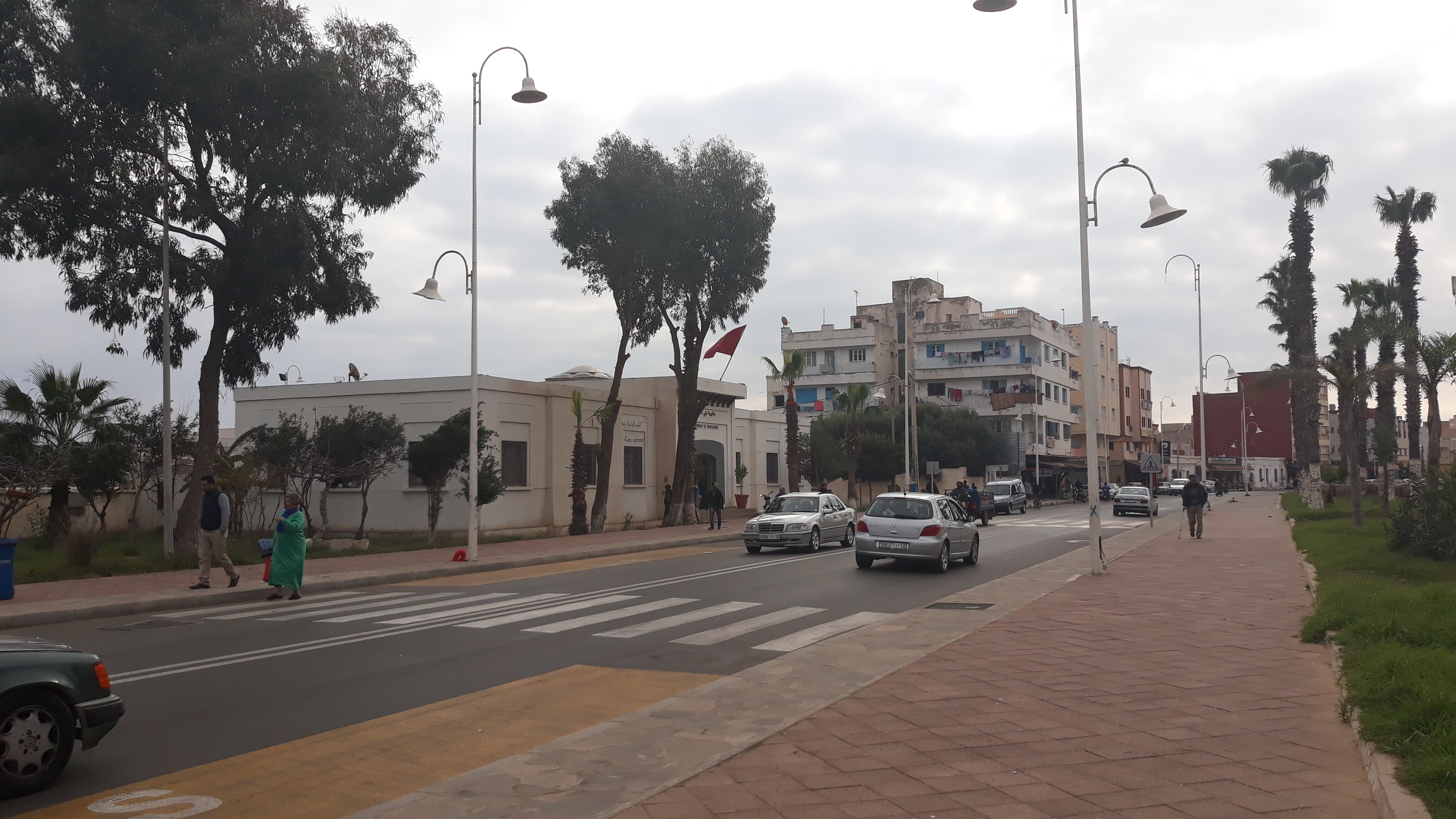
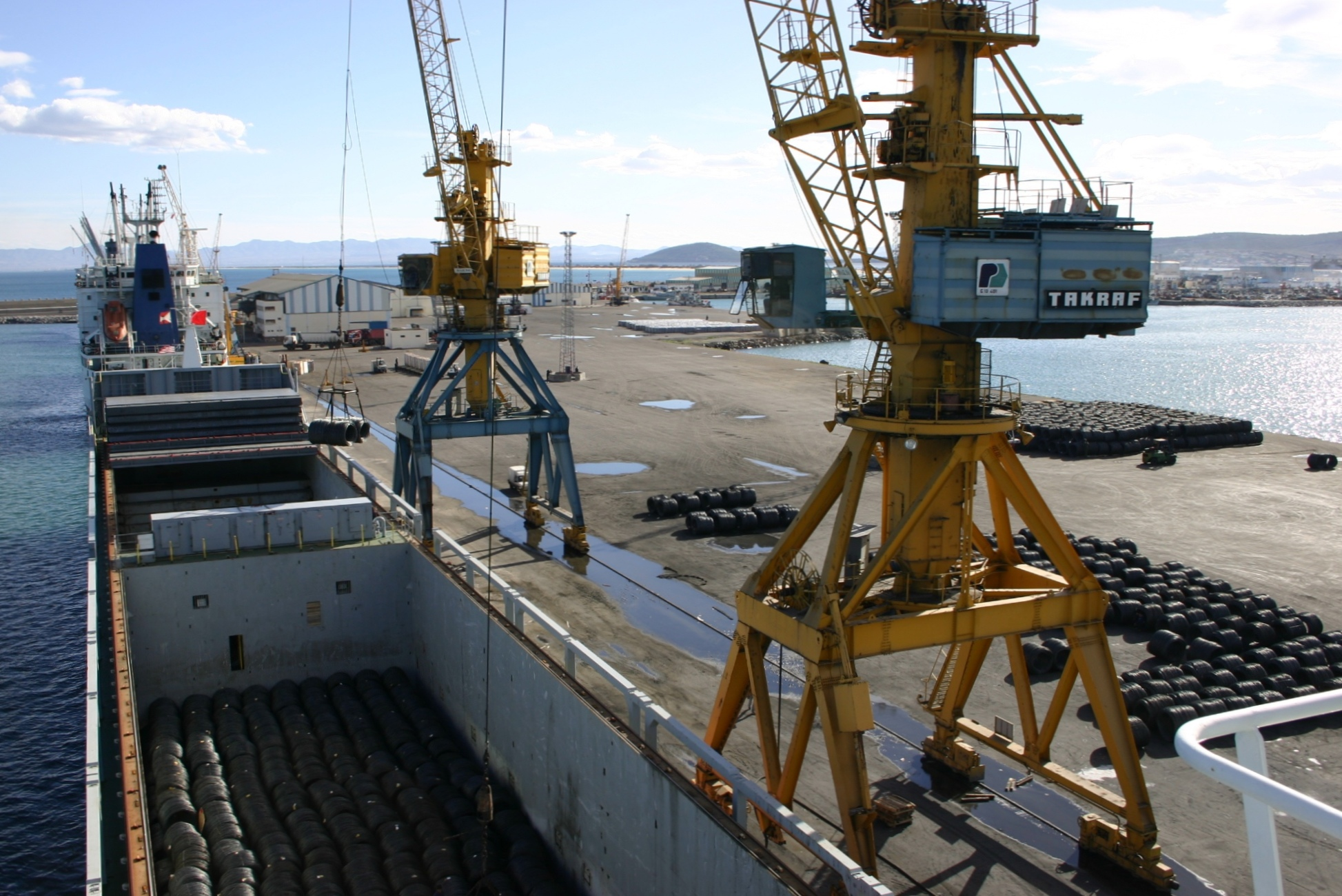
- Interactive map of Beni Ansar
- Coordinates: 35.26111°N 2.93083°W
- Country: Morocco
- Region: Oriental
- Province: Nador

Area
  - Land: 58.50 km^{2} (22.59 sq mi)
- Elevation: 37 m (121 ft)

Population (2024)
  - Total: 50,508
  - Density: 8,633/km^{2} (22,360/sq mi)
- Time zone: UTC+0 (GMT)

Beni Ansar (Note: Tarifit: ⴱⵏⵉ ⵏⵚⴰⵔ, romanized: Bni Nṣar Arabic: بْني نصار) is a town in Nador Province, Oriental, Morocco, located 12 km (7½ miles) north of the city of Nador. It is bordered on the north by the Spanish city of Melilla. According to the 2024 census, Beni Ansar has a population of 50,508.

The port of Beni Ansar is one of the main ports of Morocco, serving the city of Nador (Beni Ansar port is usually referred to as Nador Port). The urban area is bordered on the west by Mount Gurugu (Adrar n' Gourgou) and a highway, and on the east by the Lagoon of Nador (Mar Chica or Řebḥar Ameẓẓyan), the railway, and the industrial zone around the port.
