= Senhaja de Srair people =

Berber ethnic group and tribal confederation

Iṣenhajen n Srayer
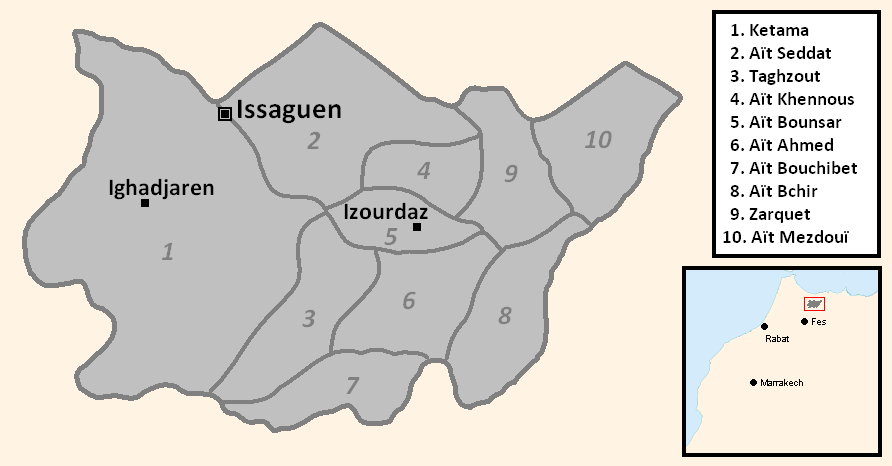
- Senhaja's Srair tribal repartition

Total population
- 151.245, ~85.000 Berber-speakers

Regions with significant populations
- Al Hoceïma Province, Morocco

Languages
- Senhaja de Srair language, Moroccan Arabic

Religion
- Islam

Related ethnic groups
- Sanhaja, Kutama

The Senhaja de Srair (Senhaja De Srair: Iṣenhajen n Srayer, Arabic: صنهاجة السراير, romanized: ṣanhāja as-srāyir) are a Berber ethnic group and tribal confederation in northern Morocco. They are established in the central Rif region, particularly in the districts of Targuist, Ketama and Bni Boufrah. They are considered an ethno-linguistic minority in Morocco.

They are distinguished from neighbouring groups such as the Riffians and the Jbala by their language, Senhaja Berber, and aspects of their cultural identity.

== Etymology ==
The term Senhaja de Srair derives from the name of the Senhaja, a large Berber tribal confederation historically spread across North Africa. While "Srair" serves to tell them apart from other Sanhaja populations in the region of northern Morocco.

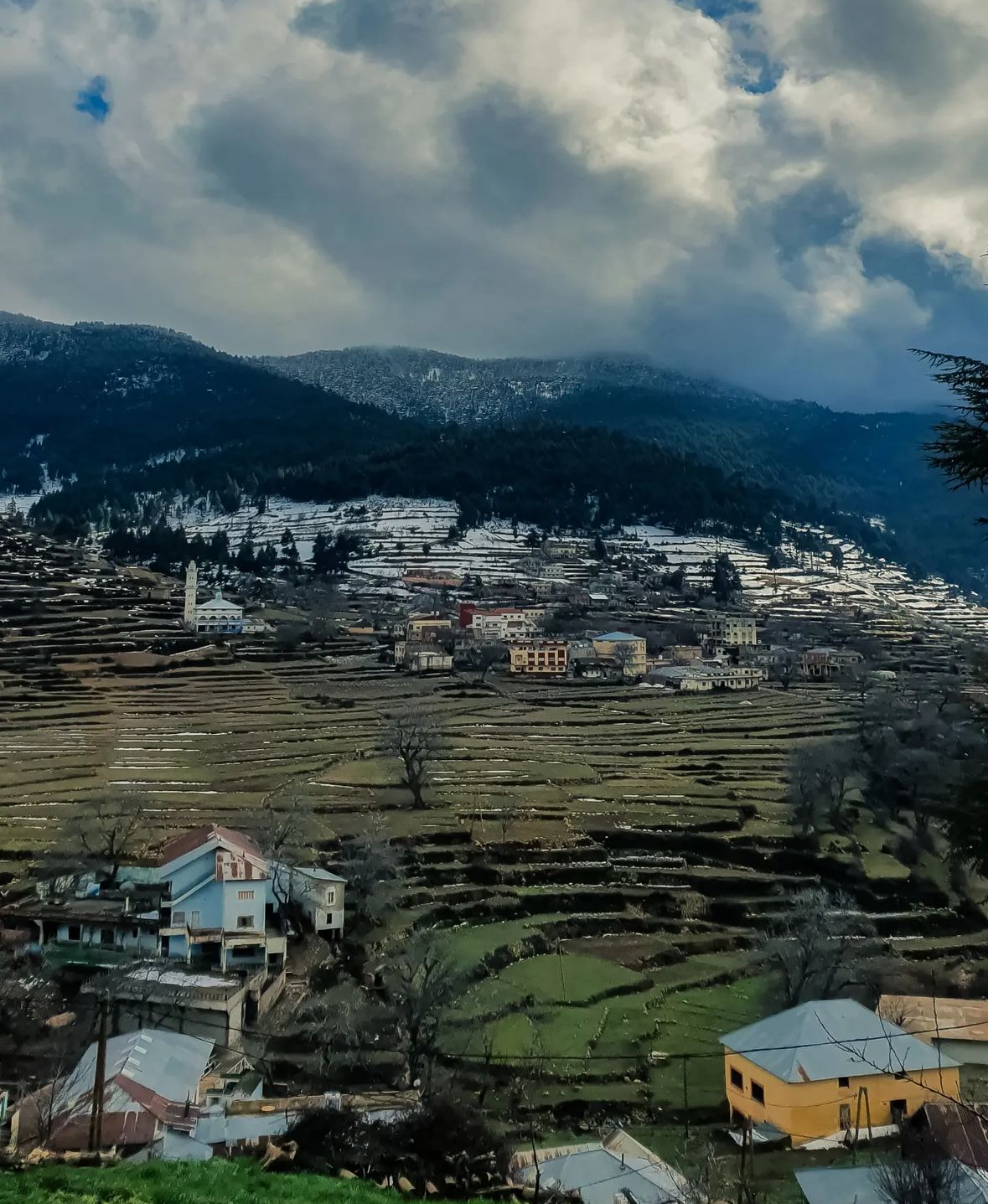
Agricultural terraces from Senhaja de Srair

The term's origin is associated with several theories. One of the most widely accepted links it to geography, as Srair is believed to refer to the agricultural terraces carved into the mountainsides and hills by the local population. Another theory connects the term to gunstocks, suggesting that Srair is the plural form of Srir, meaning gunstock, for which the confederation was historically renowned and produced in large quantities.

Some alternative names in English, include "Gun-stock Senhaja", and "Wood Senhaja". These names are linked to the Senhaja region, the highest and most wooded area in northern Morocco, whose mountains historically supplied the timber used for the stocks of flintlock guns.

== Language ==
The Senhaja de Srair speak Senhaja Berber, a Berber language of the Afro-Asiatic family. This language belongs to the Atlas branch of Berber, although it has been influenced by the neighboring Riffian varieties.

Senhaja de Srair language is classified by the UNESCO as an endangered language. It is spoken by approximately 85,000 people.

== Geography ==
Around Ketama and Targuist, the Senhaja de Srair inhabit a mountainous region, the highest in the Rif, densely covered with cedar forests, where they form a group of tribes sharing a common origin, language, history, and way of life. The region lies between Mount Tidighin, the highest peak in northern Morocco (2,456 m), and Tizi Ifri.

It also extends to the coastal area of Cala Iris, historically known as Yalliš, which Al-Bakri identifies as a port of the Sanhaja. The region is marked by extensive forests and relatively heavy precipitation, including seasonal snowfall.

The region of Senhaja de Srair, often called the Massif of Senhaja de Srair, has long remained in near-total isolation. Far from any external influence, this isolation has fostered the preservation of numerous traditions and ways of life that have disappeared in other regions.

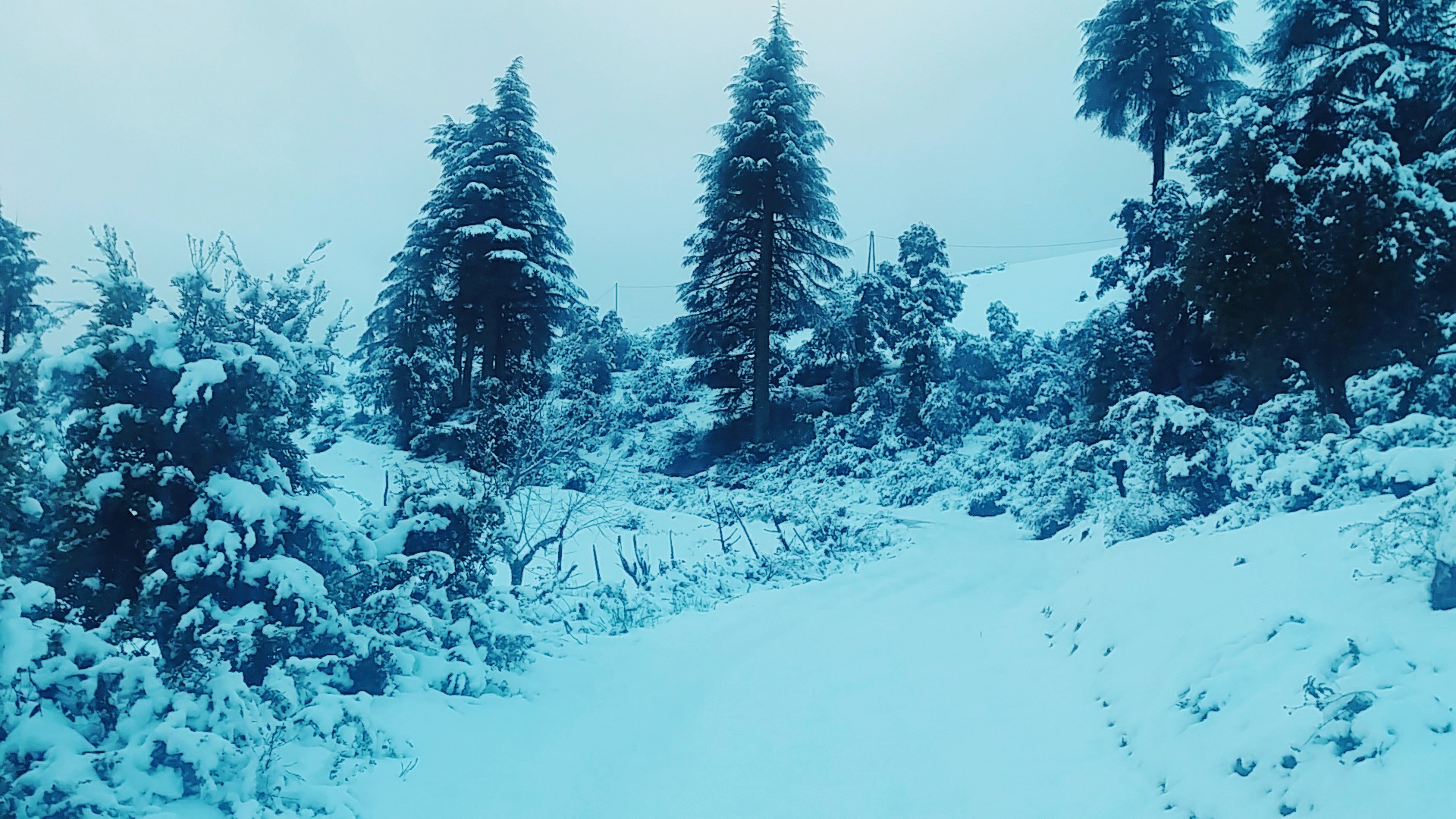
Snowfall in Ketama

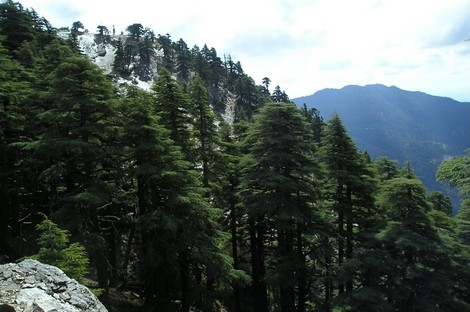
Tidighin

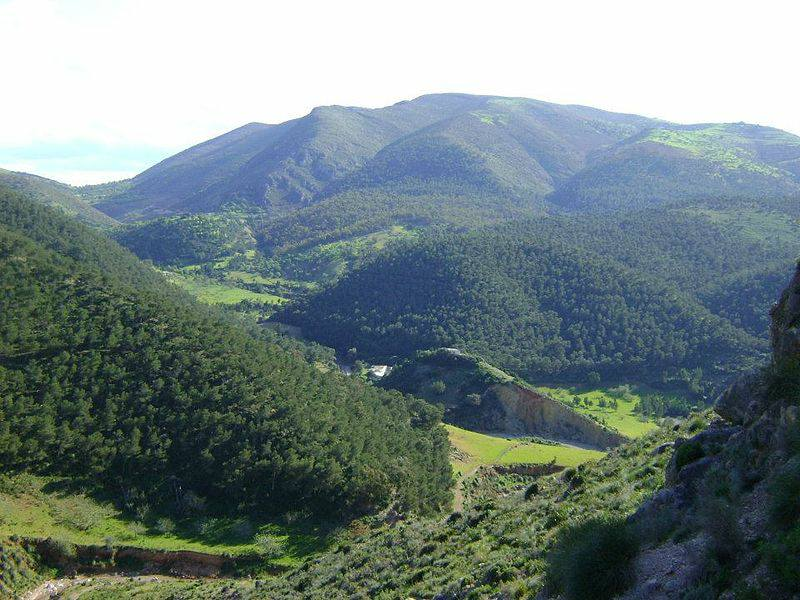
Tizi Ifri

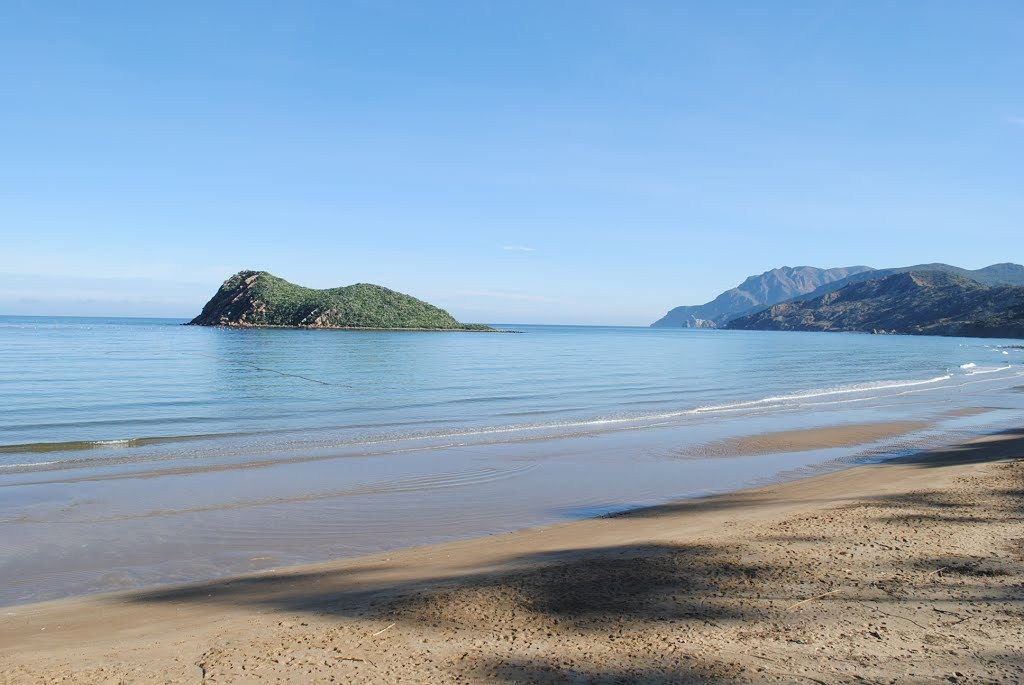
Cala Iris

== Tribal composition ==
The Senhaja de Srair are organized into a confederation, comprising eleven tribes of Sanhaja origin:

- Ketama, established around the communes of Ketama, Tamsaout, and Abdelghaya Souahel;
- Ait Seddat, located between the communes of Issaguen and Moulay Ahmed Cherif;
- Taghzut, established in the commune of Taghzout;
- Ait Khennus, located near the communes of Moulay Ahmed Cherif and Bni Bounsar;
- Ait Bunsar, established in the commune of Bni Bounsar;
- Ait Hmed, established in the commune of Bni Ahmed Imougzen;
- Ait Bushibet, established in the commune of Bni Bouchibet;
- Ait Bshir, established in the commune of Bni Bchir;
- Zerqet, located west of Targuist, in the commune of Zerkat;
- Ait Mezduy, located east of Targuist, in the commune of Sidi Boutmim;
- Targuist, the original tribe of the town of Targuist, established between the municipality of Targuist and the northern part of the commune of Sidi Boutmim.

A group of four tribes of Sanhaja origin, located north of the Senhaja Berber-speaking area, is predominantly Arabic-speaking, while also including a small proportion of Senhaja Berber speakers. These tribes are also noted to have had partial participation in the Senhaja de Srair confederation. The four tribes in this group are:

- Ait Boufrah, established around the commune of Bni Boufrah;
- Ait Gmil, established in the communes of Bni Gmil and Bni Gmil Maksouline;
- Mestassa, established near Medcher Taghzout, north of the commune of Bni Gmil;
- Mettioua, established between the communes of M'Tioua and Ouaouzgane;

All the tribes mentioned are located within Al Hoceima Province, except Mettioua.

== History ==
=== Early history ===
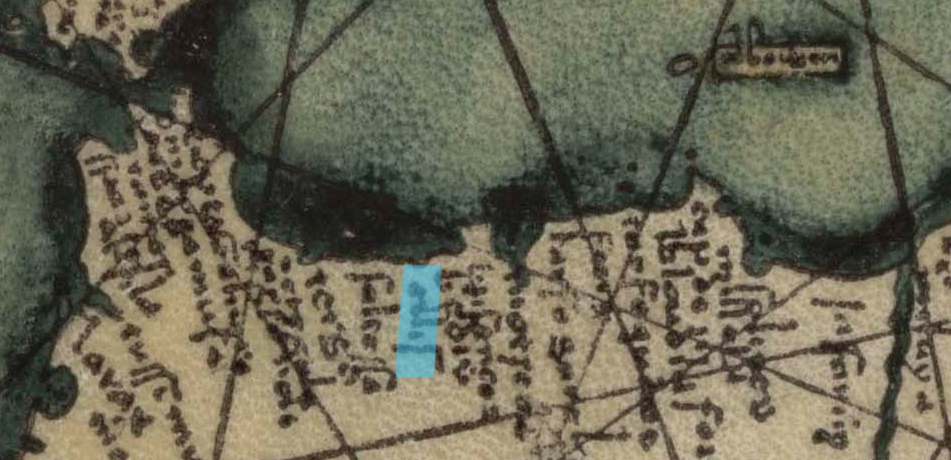
Ballish (Ellis) Location from the Catalan Atlas.

Al-Bakri provided the earliest historical record of the Senhaja in the Rif during the era of the Nekor Emirate, noting that they held the port of Balish (modern-day Cala Iris). This local mountain branch was distinctly known in the chronicles of Ibn Khaldon and Al-Qalqashandi as "Senhaja Miftah" (Arabic: صنهاجة مفتاح), to separate them from the nomadic Senhaja groups across the Maghreb. They carried massive political weight during the state's foundational period. Salih ibn Mansur, the emirate's founder, introduced Islam to the tribe and formed a strategic marriage alliance with them. His sons Al-Mu'tasim and Idris, who both succeeded him as rulers, were born to this Senhajan mother. Because of this early territorial footprint, the entire stretch of coastline from Mestassa in the west to the area around Badis in the east, including the Port of Balish and Senhaja Castle, remained tied to the Senhaja name for centuries.

The name of Senhaja Miftah reappeared in 1164 during the Almohad era, when Merzdagh Al-Senhaji, from the Senhaja Miftah tribe, launched a great revolt against the Almohads. He recruited many tribes from the north, including the Senhaja, Awraba, and Ghomara. Merzdagh even minted coins in his own name, bearing the inscription "Merzdagh the Stranger, God's Victory is Near" (Arabic: مرزدغ الغريب نصر الله قريب, romanized: Merzdagh al-Gharib, Nasru Allahi Qarib). He then launched attacks on the Banu Tawda, a strategic village and Almoravid-built fortress located near Fez in the Fechtala and Sless region. Merzdagh captured the fortress and killed many of its inhabitants, leaving the settlement in ruins, after which the site became locally known as Fes el Bali (Old Fes). This enraged the Almohad authorities, who dispatched an enormous army from Marrakesh, ultimately crushing the rebellion and resulting in his death.

=== Rif War ===
The Senhaja de Srair confederation contributed largely and immersed itself fully into the Rif War under the strategic local leadership of Mohammed Seddiq Akhamlish, head of the Zawiya Khamlishia, who was deeply respected all across the confederation. Utilizing the immense spiritual prestige and socio-political network of his Zawiya, Akhamlish worked actively in favor of the anti-colonial resistance movements that took place in the Rif, supporting both the early campaigns of Mohamed Amezian and the succeeding war led by Abdelkrim El Khattabi. Under his guidance, the Senhaja de Srair tribes were successfully mobilized to rally to the Rif War, transforming the rugged massif into a critical military and logistical backbone for the Republic of the Rif.

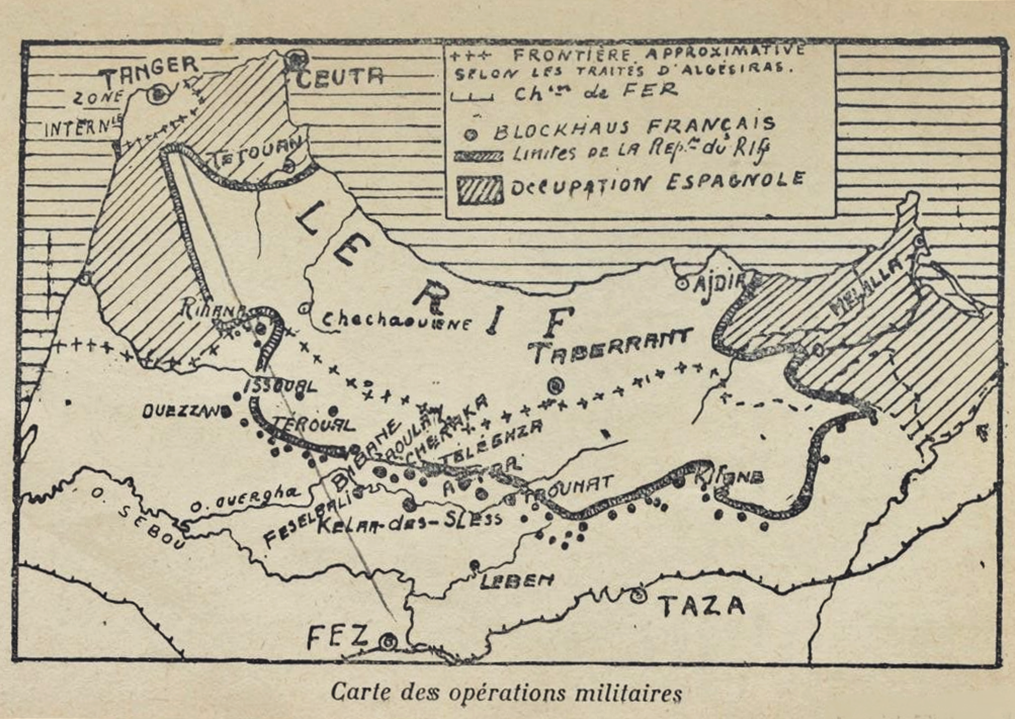
Rif republic borders.

After continuous colonial attacks led by Spain and France caused the fall of the Rif Republic, Abdelkrim sought refuge in Targuist at the Zawiya Khamlishia, where he surrendered in 1926. However, the Senhaja de Srair did not despair; instead, they continued their resistance under Slitan Akhamlish, a Khamlishi marabout, until 1927. Slitan gathered a group of rebels in the mountains and launched an attack on a military outpost in Taghzut on 26 March 1927, where his fighters defeated a column of Regulares, leaving only one trooper alive.

The following day, Captain Ostáriz led a relief force of 12 officers and 292 men toward Taghzut. His command was ambushed near the town of Admam, where Ostáriz and his entire force were killed. This event led Colonel Pozas, Colonel Mola, and Lieutenant Colonel Solans to mobilize a force of 7,000 to 14,000 men to search for Slitan. However, the operation faced a severe blizzard on 11 April, which halted all searching operations. The colonial columns suffered heavy casualties from the snow, wind, and cold, and were repeatedly attacked by the forces of Slitan and Muhend Aseddath, who were armed with traditional rifles of Taghzut, resulting in a large number of troops being buried in the snow. To avoid execution, Slitan managed to escape to the French zone. He returned later and was appointed as the Qaid of Targuist and Ait Mezduy in 1940.

=== Cannabis ===
Cannabis cultivation is deeply rooted in local history, documented for several centuries and reinforced during the 20th century (with the hippie wave of the 1970s), before becoming a central element of the local economy. At the end of the 19th century, cannabis was cultivated on small plots for local and national markets, alongside other traditional crops. Consumer demand for recreational use was not excessive. Later, during the Protectorate period (1912–1956), Morocco saw the emergence of two cannabis markets: the monopoly market and the contraband market.

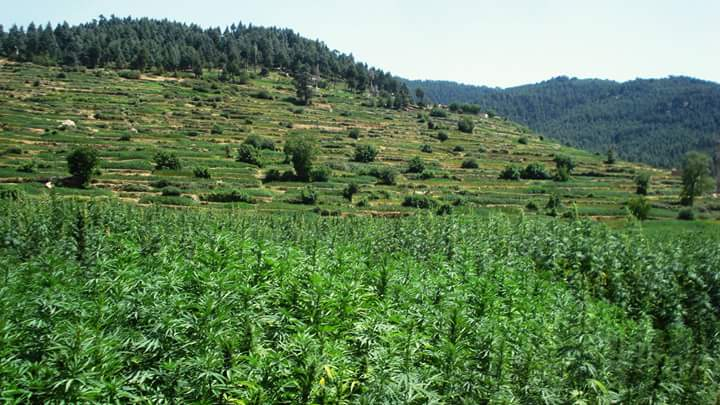
Cannabis Fields in Ketama

The Senhaja de Srair tribes of Ketama and Ait Seddat, were the only regions where this cultivation was legal, as the Sultan Moulay Hassan I authorized its continuation until the lands could be repurposed for other crops. Currently, cannabis (kif) cultivation remains predominant in the region, and the cannabis of Ketama is still renowned for its quality. Ketama's cannabis farmers were able to make the quality of their cannabis known through their mastery of the craft, the secrets of its therapeutic benefits they possessed, their appreciation of the flavors of cannabis, and, above all, the fact that they consumed their own cannabis.

This cultivation is believed to have been introduced by Sidi Heddi, the spiritual leader of the Heddawa, who was reportedly the first to bring back seeds from Asia in the 18th century. He settled among the Ketama people, who would become one of the cannabis suppliers for Sidi Heddi's sect (Ismaili Shia/Fatimid). This history partly explains the unique attachment of the Ketama people to this crop, linked to their relationship with the Fatimid dynasty, which is considered the origin of the Kutama.

Starting in the 19th century, cannabis smokers became increasingly numerous among the peasant population. And according to the Heddawa, the consumption of cannabis facilitates the recitation of Dhikr (remembrance of God) and the worship of God. Thus, they preferred Ketama's cannabis for its quality; they used to say: Khutna ketama nas fûhama, iqal'u alghaba, iḥartu nal-bûhala al-cannabis u-ttaba. 'Our Ketama brothers are intelligent people! They clear the forest to plant cannabis and tobacco for the fools'.

== Culture and society ==
=== Religion ===
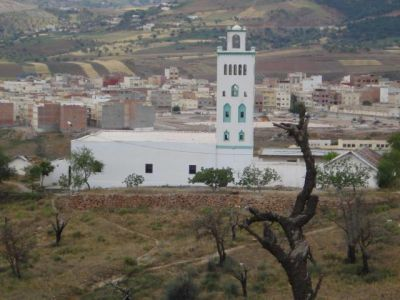
Mosque of Sidi Butmim, Targuist.

The Senhaja de Srair are predominantly Muslims. According to Abdulrahman Al-Tayyibi in his work. They follow the Sunni Sufi sect of the Tariqa Khamlishia and have historically been guided and ruled by the leadership of the Zawiya Khamlishia.

Nevertheless, the Senhaja de Srair are still attached to their ancestral beliefs, rites, and superstitions. Maraboutism, or the cult of saints, is still deeply rooted among them, alongside the veneration of caves, certain animals, and other secret forces of nature.

=== Handicraft ===
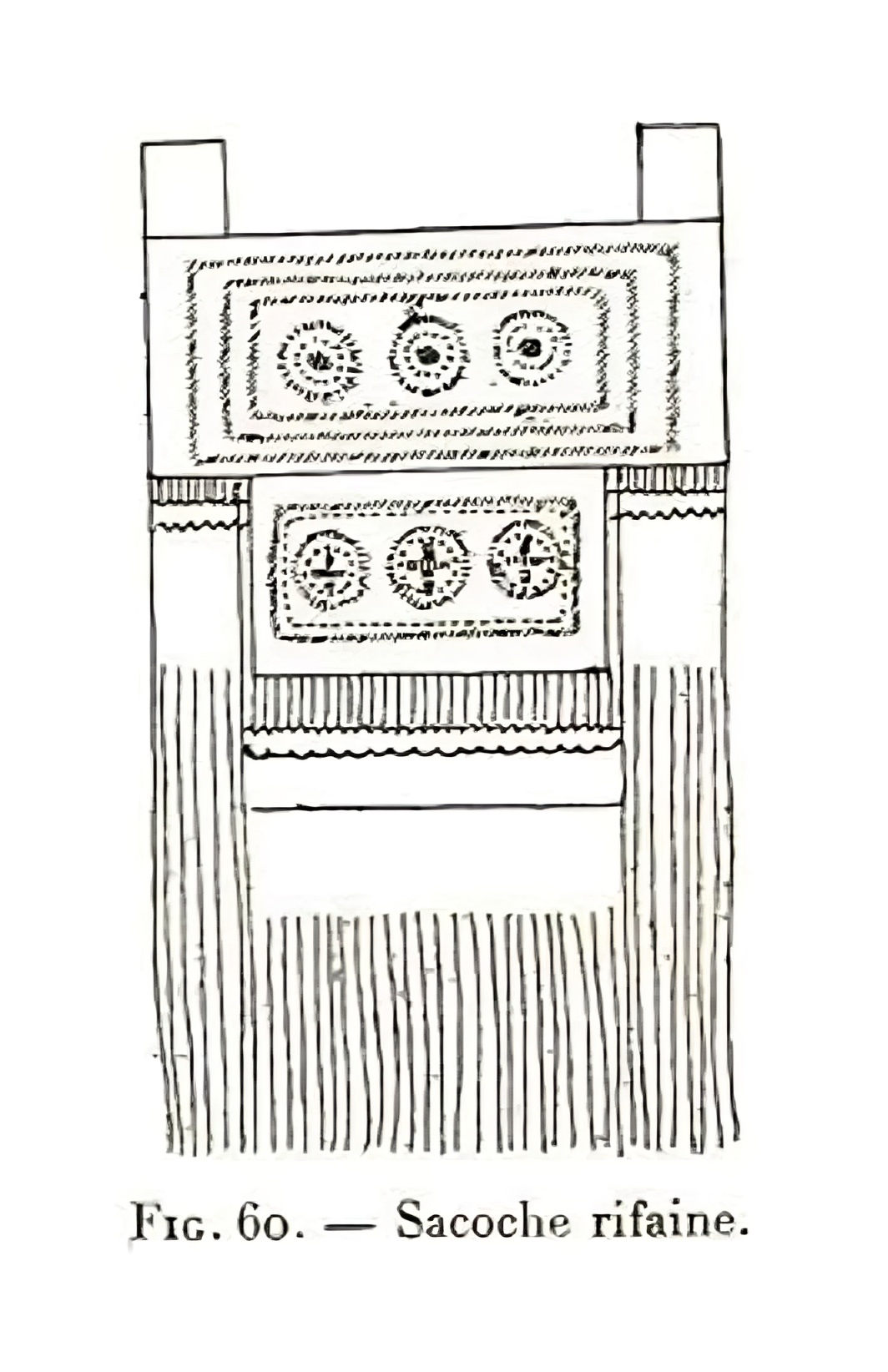
Leather bag of Taghzut.

Leather bag of Taghzut.

Taghzut, among the Senhaja de Srair tribes, was renowned throughout Morocco for its leatherwork, woodworking and silversmithing, as well as for the manufacture of damascened Moroccan rifles, firearms, and gun powder. These weapons were notably used during the Rif War to resist the Spanish colonial forces. The inhabitants also produced large quantities of long knives, similar to Kabyle daggers.

Through gunsmithing, leatherwork, and marquetry, the people of Taghzut were regarded as among the most highly skilled artisans in northern Morocco, and many traveled long distances to practice their crafts. Around 2,500 artisans from Taghzut were reportedly distributed across the country, establishing workshops in cities such as Fez, Rabat, Casablanca, Marrakesh, Tangier, Tetouan and Nador.

- Leatherwork of Taghzut on YouTube.
- Marquetry of Taghzut on YouTube.

=== Architecture ===
Traditional houses of Taghzut

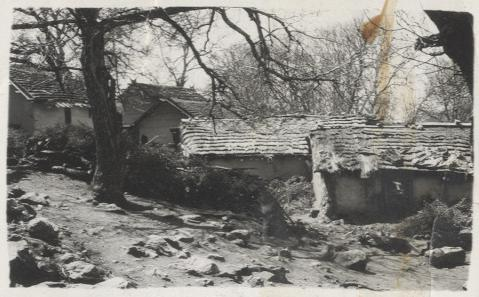
Traditional houses of Ait Seddat

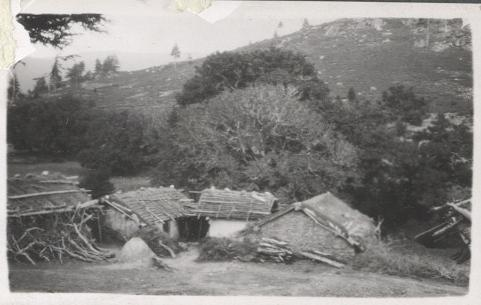
Traditional houses of Ait Seddat

The traditional houses of the Senhaja de Srair are usually clustered in hamlets scattered across the mountainous landscape. They are built on a rectangular base made of mud brick or stone, with young cedar trunks or riparian wood used to support the structure, and roofs traditionally thatched with rye straw and cork. These houses are often decorated with symbolic elements, especially on the ridgepoles placed between the main timbers, which are associated with hospitality, protection, and good fortune.

Two-story houses are particularly common in the Senhaja region, more so than in much of northern Morocco. Some dwellings and religious structures also incorporate Moorish arches around their doorways and windows, which is exclusive to the Senhaja de Srair. Due to the abundance of forests in the region, wood has long been the principal building material, while stone walls are commonly covered with plaster.

However, with the arrival of modernization and the socio-economic changes that have transformed the Senhaja de Srair region, traditional houses have increasingly been replaced by concrete and cement buildings with flat roofs. Despite this shift, the older architectural style still survives in some areas and remains in use, particularly among poorer households in Senhaja de Srair.

== Notable people ==
- Soufiane El Bakkali
- Bilal El Khannouss
- Karima Adebibe
- Moestafa El Kabir
- Asmaa Khamlichi
- Rachid Talbi Alami
- Abdellatif Adebibe
- Abdelkhalek Aghzout
- Targuist Sniper
- Yusuf Akhamrich
- Charif Adardak
- Mohamed Aujjar

== See also ==
- Association of Amazighs of Senhaja of the Rif
- Rif
- Senhaja de Srair language
- Targuist
- Tidighin
- Torres Castle
