= Ait Seddat =

Berber tribe

Ait Seddat Ayt Seddat
- Senhaja de Srair tribe
- Ait Seddat tribal map
- Ethnicity: Senhaja de Srair
- Location: Issaguen and Moulay Ahmed Cherif, Al Hoceïma Province
- Population: 17,095 (2014 census)
- Language: Senhaja de Srair language

Ait Seddat (Senhaja De Srair: Ayt Seddat) is a Berber tribe belonging to the Senhaja de Srair confederation, located in the central Rif Mountains of northern Morocco. Geographically and administratively, the tribe's territory is divided between the rural communes of Issaguen and Moulay Ahmed Cherif within the Al Hoceïma Province.

== Geography and organization ==
By surface area, Ait Seddat is the second largest tribe of Senhaja de Srair, surpassed only by the neighboring Ketama tribe. The tribal homeland is characterized by the high-altitude mountainous terrain, dense surrounding cedar forests, and steep slopes that are heavily blanketed in snow during the winter months, as it directly neighbors Mount Tidighin, the highest mountain in the Rif range.

The biggest center of Ait Seddat is Issaguen, which serves as the primary economic and administrative hub for the region. While Issaguen is the most prominent urban locality, the tribal territory also spans numerous rural villages and fractions scattered across the commune, including those within the neighboring Moulay Ahmed Cherif commune.

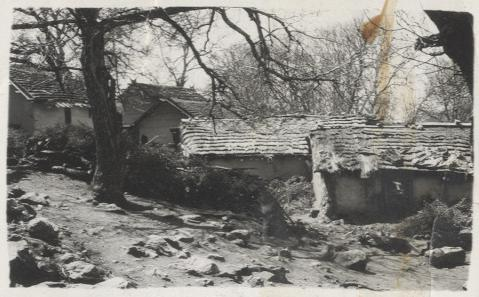
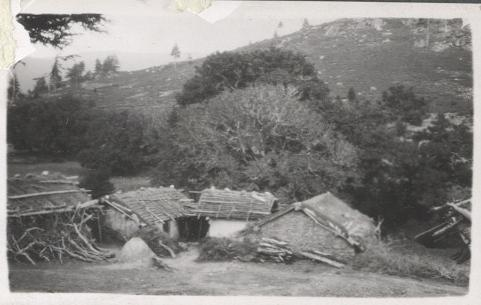

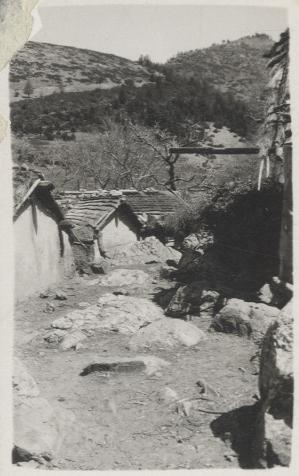
Traditional houses of Ait Seddat

Ait Seddat consists of three tribal fractions, each with its own villages, such as:

Ait Arbi

- Azila
- Aguersif
- Tighissa
- Ain El Bida

Ait Douriyyin

- Stah
- Bougherda
- Imassinen
- Imaziouen
- Ouareg

Tala Rouaq

- Tala Rouaq
- Tidouin
- Tamedda
- Tisseghra
- Tacht
