= Bashikh festival =

Berber festival

Bashikh festival Bacix
- Genre: cultural
- Date: January 12–14
- Frequency: annually
- Locations: Targuist, Tétouan, Tangier
- Country: Morocco
- Years active: 2013–now
- Inaugurated: 2013
- Organiser: Association of Amazighs of Senhaja of the Rif

Bashikh (Senhaja De Srair: Bacix) is an annual cultural and harvest festival celebrated by the Senhaja de Srair, who inhabit the central Rif of northern Morocco. Traditionally, Bashikh is a week-long celebration that coincides with the Amazigh New Year. Currently, the event is organized as a two-day festival by the Association of Amazighs of Senhaja of the Rif, and past editions have been hosted across Targuist, Tétouan, and Tangier.
