= Taghzut =

Berber tribe

Taghzut Taɣzut
- Senhaja de Srair tribe
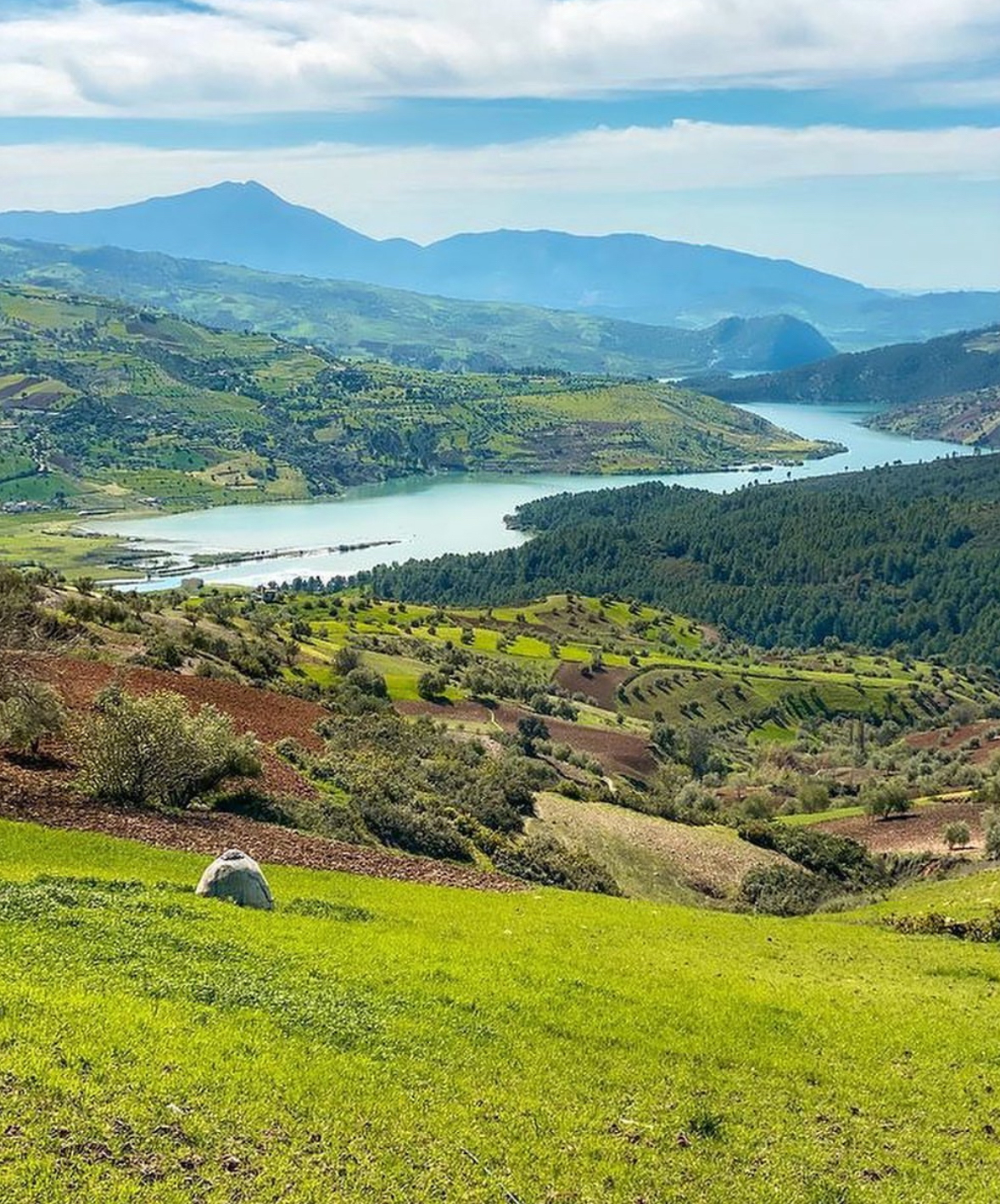
- Taghzut's landscape
- Ethnicity: Senhaja de Srair
- Location: Taghzout commune, Al Hoceïma Province
- Population: 5,132 (2014 census)
- Language: Senhaja de Srair language
- Surnames: Artisan tribe

Taghzut (Senhaja De Srair: Taɣzut) is a Berber tribe belonging to the Senhaja de Srair confederation, located in the central Rif Mountains of northern Morocco. Geographically and administratively, the tribe's historical territory centers in the rural commune of Taghzout within the Al Hoceïma Province.

Taghzut is famous throughout the country for its handicrafts, leathercrafts, gunsmithing, and marquetry, and its artisans are considered among the most skilled in northern Morocco.

== Etymology ==
Taghzut is a Berber word that means strait, confluence, plot of land, riverside field, alluvial land. The term directly reflects the local geography of the tribe's territory, which is situated in a fertile valley basin enclosed by the high, rugged mountains of the Rif range.

During the spanish and the french colonial administrations of Morocco, Taghzut was transliterated into European records under the variant spellings of Tagsut, Tarhzout, and Taghzout.

== Demography and organization ==
According to the Moroccan census of 2014, Taghzut has a population of 5,132 people and 966 households.

Historically, the tribe's central hub is located at Ulad Wartit. The tribal territory is organized into two prominent fractions, namely:

El Kalaa

- El Kalaa
- Ait Ikhlef
- Ait Bekkar
- Iouertiten

Es-sahel

- Tiririn
- Iguraren
- Tazarin
- Taria Mezzit
- Taria Ait Meryem
