= Abdellatif Adebibe =

Moroccan cannabis activist (born 1955)

- Born: c. 1955; Issaguen
- Citizenship: Moroccan
- Education: Sciences Po
- Occupation: Militant for the legality of cannabis
- Years active: c. 1994–present

Abdellatif Adebibe (born c. 1955 near Ketama, in Issaguen) is a Moroccan civil activist and a prominent advocate for cannabis legalization and regulation rights in Morocco.

He is the president of the “Confederation of Associations for the Development of the Senhaja Rif Region”, and got engaged in many international commissions and meetings such as the United Nations Commission on Narcotic Drugs in Vienna, UNGASS 2016 in New York, and the Global Forum of Producers of Prohibited Plants in Heemskerk.

Adebibe has maintained a 30-year campaign of activism and militance, dedicated to defending the socio-economic rights of the traditional cannabis farmers in the Rif region, and more specifically in Ketama.
