= Association of Amazighs of Senhaja of the Rif =

Berber association

- Tamesmunt Imaziɣen Iẓnagen n Rrif
- Founded: 2012
- Founded at: Targuist
- Type: NGO
- Headquarters: Targuist, Ketama, Bni Boufrah
- Official language: Senhaja de Srair language, Arabic
- Leader: Charif Adardak

The Association of Amazighs of Senhaja of the Rif (Berber languages: ⵜⴰⵎⵙⵎⵓⵏⵜ ⵉⵎⴰⵣⵉⵖⵏ ⵉⵥⵏⴰⴳⵏ ⵏ ⵔⵔⵉⴼ, romanized: Tamesmunt Imaziɣen Iẓnagen n Rrif; Arabic: جمعية أمازيغ صنهاجة الريف) is a Moroccan Berber cultural association founded in 2012 in Targuist, in the Rif region of Morocco. It works to promote and preserve the language, culture, and heritage of the Senhaja de Srair.

The association has played an important role in shaping identity discourse among the Senhaja de Srair. Over time, it has also introduced new cultural initiatives in support of the Amazigh cause, such as the Bashikh festival and the Tidighin magazine, both of which reflect ongoing efforts to promote and strengthen the Senhaja de Srair cultural movement.
