= Ketama (Moroccan tribe) =

Berber tribe in northern Morocco

Ketama Ikutamen
- Senhaja de Srair tribe
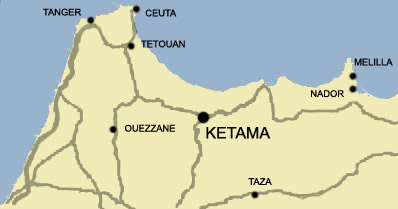
- Ketama's location
- Ethnicity: Senhaja de Srair
- Location: Ketama, Tamsaout and Abdelghaya Souahel. Al Hoceïma Province
- Parent tribe: Kutama
- Population: 56,879 (2014 census)
- Language: Senhaja de Srair language, Moroccan Arabic
- Surnames: Cannabis capital

Ketama (Senhaja De Srair: Ikutamen) is a Berber tribe belonging to the Senhaja de Srair confederation, located in the central Rif Mountains of northern Morocco. Geographically and administratively, the tribe's historical territory centers in the rural communes of Ketama, Tamsaout, and Abdelghaya Souahel within the Al Hoceïma Province.

The main concentration of Senhaja de Srair speakers is located in Abdelghaya Souahel, estimated at around 17,000, while the remainder of the tribe is noticeably Arabized.

== Geography and organization ==
Ketama is the largest tribe within the Senhaja de Srair confederation. Its territory is situated in a high-elevation mountain valley surrounded by dense cedar forests, and historically, it was considered one of the most isolated regions in northern Morocco. The Ketama tribe consists of two main centers: Ikawen, which is situated in the rural commune of Abdelghaya Souahel, and Tlata Ketama, which is situated in the rural commune of Ketama.

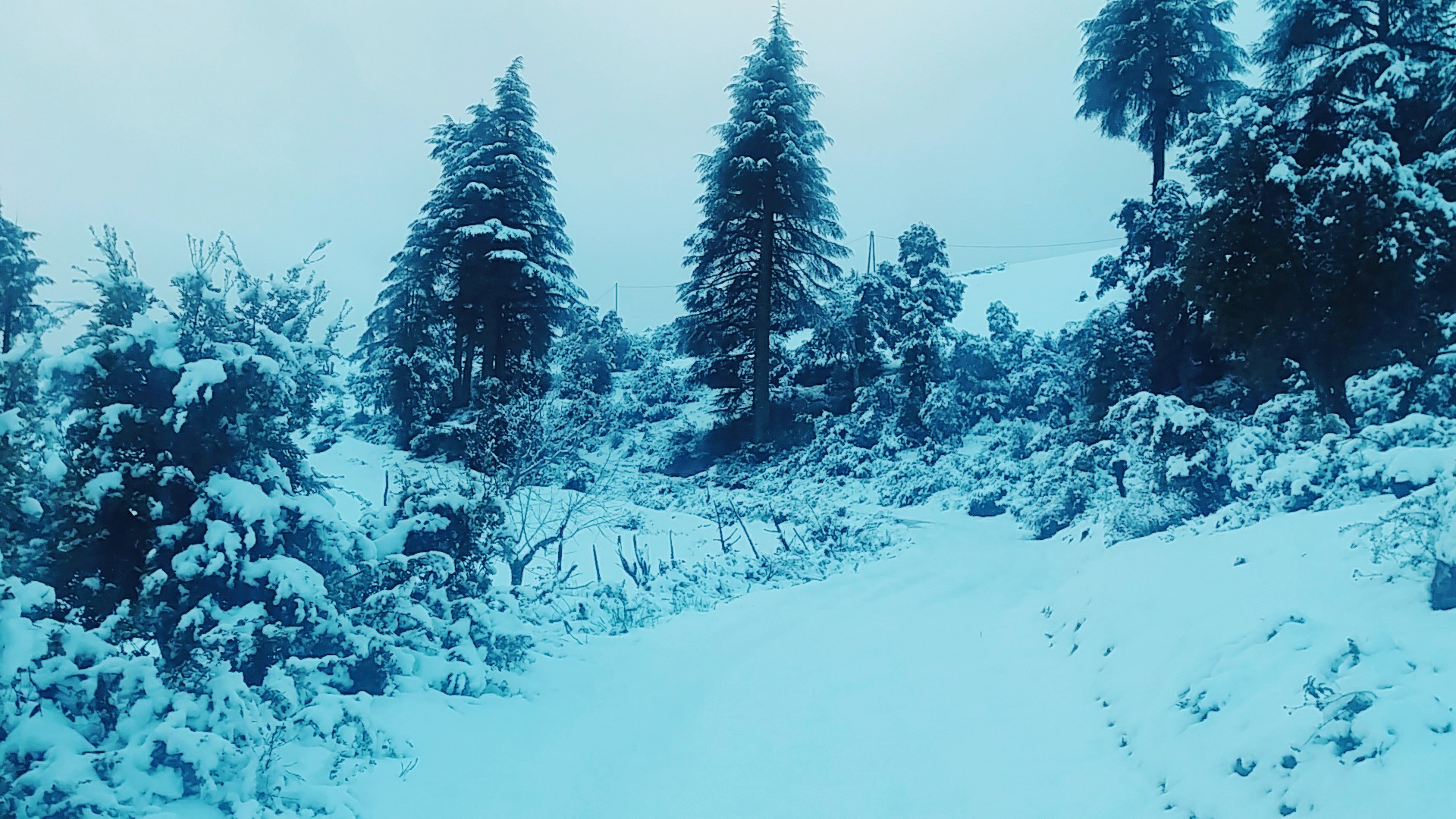
Snowfall in Ketama

Organizationally, the Ketama tribe is structured into five tribal fractions, each comprising its own distinct villages:

Amzaz

- Griha
- Tamlougit
- Ouhchiyet
- El Khoms
- Ighmad

Bni Tmim

- Iaminet
- Arguiouen
- Zaouiat Es-sunni
- Talemques
- Asmartas
- Barnas

Es-souahel

- Bni Hassan
- Tafelchout
- Iguerouan
- Bouflou
- El Azib
- Takkoucht
- Achqara
- Meziaz
- Taria
- Talghount

Tamsaout

- Tamsaout
- Marguen
- Abkayer
- Aguersif
- Azghar
- Asoual

Abdelghaya

- Ait Aaksi
- Ait Ahmed
- Makhzen
- Asammar
- Sahel
- Izdad
