= Zerqet =

Berber tribe

- Senhaja de Srair tribe
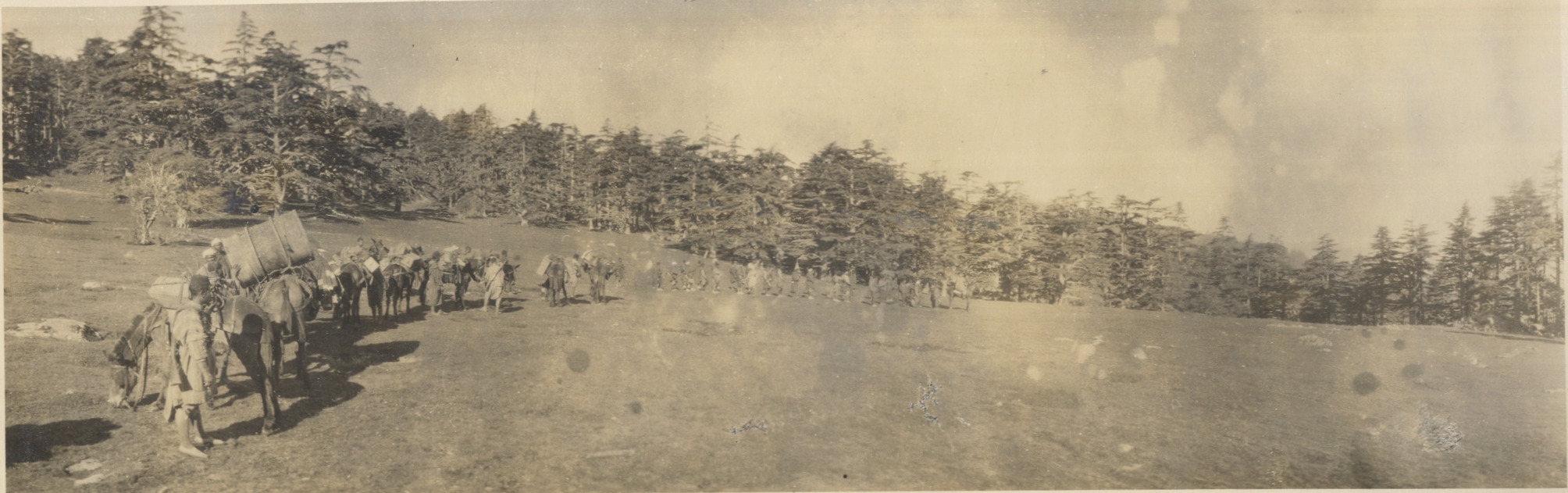
- Zerqet's landscape
- Ethnicity: Senhaja de Srair
- Location: Zerkat, Al Hoceïma Province
- Population: 6750 (2014 census)
- Language: Senhaja de Srair language
- Surnames: Tribe of Greenery

Zerqet (Senhaja De Srair: Zerqet) is a Berber tribe belonging to the Senhaja de Srair confederation, located in the central Rif Mountains of northern Morocco. Geographically and administratively, the tribe's territory centers in the rural commune of Zerkat within the Al Hoceïma Province.

== Etymology ==
During the Spanish protectorate, the tribe's name was translated as Cabila de la Verdora (transl. Tribe of Greenery), referring to the territory's dense forests and abundant vegetation. In the local Berber language of Senhaja de Srair, there is no distinct word specifically for green; instead, the term azegzaw is used to denote both green and blue. When adapted into Arabic, the term became Zarqā' (from which Zerqet derives), effectively transferring the primary meaning of the term to blue despite its original reference to the region's green landscape.

== Geography and organization ==
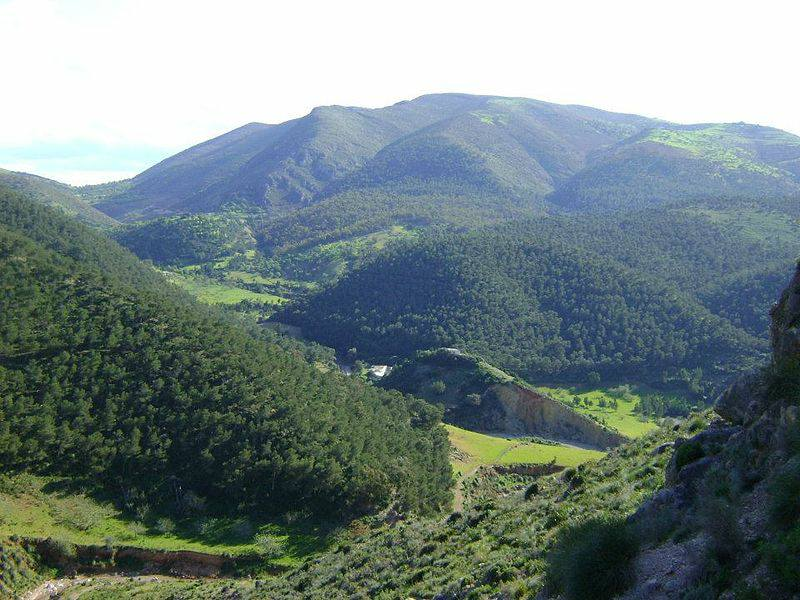
Tizi Ifri

Zerqet is situated near Targuist in the Rif region of northern Morocco. Its territory includes Tizi Ifri and features dense forest cover, which historically contributed to the area's abundant vegetation. The political center of Zerqet is Timdiqit.

Organizationally, Zerqet is structured into two tribal fractions, each comprising its own distinct villages

Allal & Iguermalet

- Allal
- Wersan
- Iguermalet
- Aghennouy
- M'dar
- Iguedman
- Timilout
- Tifrouas

Ifellihen & Messoumet

- El Quitoun
- Ifellihen
- Hmayed
- Isiaamaren
- Ikherrouden
- Afrag u Aish
- Aouni
- Bellehkem
- Bounjel
- Almou n Tizirt
