= Targuist Sniper =

Moroccan anti-corruption activist

Targuist Sniper Mounir Aghzennay
- Born: Targuist
- Years active: 2007-2011
- Known for: Anti-corruption activism

Targuist Sniper, whose real name is Mounir Aghzennay, (Note: The spelling Agueznay widely used by mainstream media sources like TelQuel, is a transliteration mistake from the Arabic أغزناي. His official personal profile utilizes the correct spelling Aghzennay.) is a Moroccan anti-corruption activist who gained widespread national and international prominence in 2007. Working anonymously from the town of Targuist in the Al Hoceïma Province of northern Morocco, he secretly recorded the first in a series of videos on Youtube that showed footage of Royal Moroccan Gendarmerie and police officers taking bribes from motorists at highway checkpoints.

His videos gained millions of views, and had deeply shocked the majority of Moroccans, while also catching the attention of many people across the world. Aghzennay was also engaged in regional activities, as he is also part of the Association of Amazighs of Senhaja of the Rif, and has expressed a strong desire of defending his country from corruption.
