= Tidighin =

Mountain in Morocco

Mount Tidighin
- Adrar n Tidiɣin
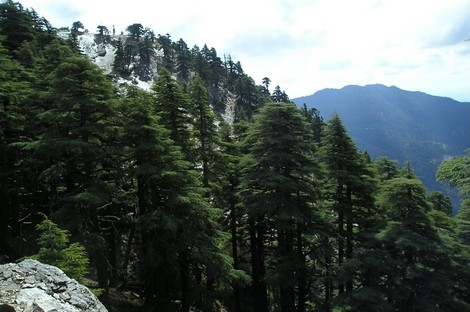

Highest point
- Elevation: 2,456 m (8,058 ft)
- Prominence: 1,901 m (6,237 ft)
- Listing: List of Ultras of Africa, Ribu
- Coordinates: 34°51′0″N 4°30′36″W

Naming
- Language of name: Senhaja Berber

Geography
- Location: Tanger-Tetouan-Al Hoceima, Morocco
- Parent range: Rif

Climbing
- First ascent: Unknown
- Easiest route: From Issaguen

Mount Tidighin (Senhaja De Srair: Adrar n Tidiɣin, Arabic: Jbel Tidighin) is a mountain in Al Hoceïma Province, Tanger-Tetouan-Al Hoceima, Morocco. Its summit elevation is 2,456 metres (8,058 ft). Tidighin is the heart of the confederation of Senhaja Srair.

== Geography ==
Colonial Topographic map of Tidighin.

Tidighin is the highest mountain of the Rif Range. It is an ultra-prominent peak that rises above the town of Ketama, now known as Issaguen, in an area known for the hospitality of the local Berber people, as well as for cannabis cultivation. It is located 320 km (200 mi) to the north of Morocco's geographical centre and 232 km (144 mi) northeast of the capital Rabat.
