= Ghomara language =

Berber language of Morocco

Ghomara
- Native to: Morocco
- Region: Chefchaouen Province
- Ethnicity: Ghomara
- Native speakers: 10,000 (2008)
- Language family: Afro-Asiatic: Berber; Northern; Atlas; Ghomara

Language codes
- ISO 639-3: gho
- Glottolog: ghom1257
- ELP: Ghomara
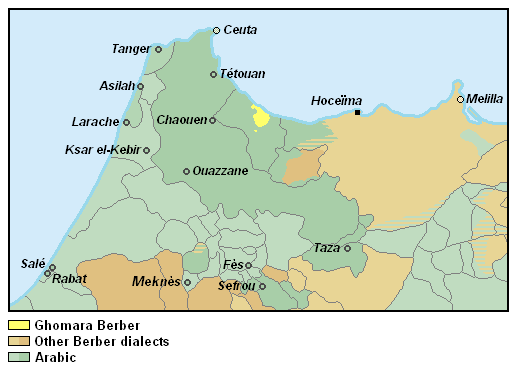

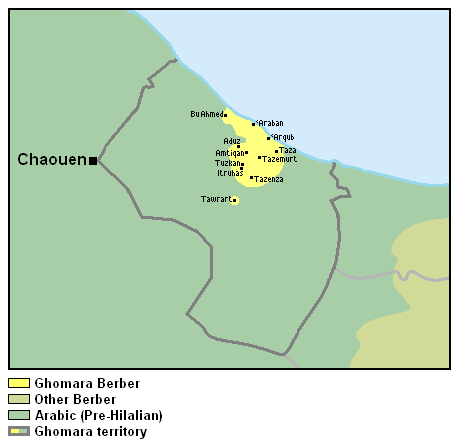
- Ghomara Berber

The Ghomara language is a Northern Berber language spoken in Morocco. It is the mother tongue of the Ghomara Berbers, who total around 10,000 people. Ghomara Berber is spoken on the western edge of the Rif, among the Beni Bu Zra and Beni Mansur tribes of the Ghomara confederacy. Despite being listed as endangered, it is still being passed on to children in these areas.

Ghomara Berber is relatively similar to Senhaja de Srair Berber spoken around Ketama. However, it is difficult to understand for a speaker of Rifian.

Some typical features that distinguish the Ghomara variety of Berber from Rifian Berber are the use of the preposition dar instead of the Rifian ghar, the feminine plural ending -an instead of -in, and the absence of spirantisation in word-initial position.

== Current status ==
Although elderly Ghomara teach children how to speak Ghomara Berber at home, the language is still considered threatened, with only 10,000 known speakers. A major reason can be attributed to the small geographical location where this language is used, as well as the more common usage of Moroccan Arabic throughout Morocco.

== Phonology ==
=== Vowels ===
Like most other varieties of Berber, Ghomara has three vowels: a-, i-, u-.

=== Consonants ===
Ghomara has 44 consonants, and most consonants in Ghomara have geminated forms.

		Bilabial	Dental		Alveolar		Post- alveolar	Velar		Uvular		Pharyngeal	Glottal
		Bilabial	plain	phar.	plain	phar.	Post- alveolar	plain	lab.	plain	lab.	Pharyngeal	Glottal
Nasal		m			n								
Plosive/ Affricate	voiceless	p			t	tˤ	t͡ʃ	k	kʷ	q			(ʔ)
Plosive/ Affricate	voiced	b			d	dˤ	d͡ʒ	g	gʷ				
Fricative	voiceless	ɸ	θ		s	sˤ	ʃ	x	xʷ	χ	χʷ	ħ	
Fricative	voiced	β	ð	(ðˤ)	z	zˤ	ʒ	ɣ	ɣʷ	ʁ	ʁʷ	ʕ	
Approximant					l	(lˤ)	j		w				ʔ̞
Flap					r	rˤ							

== Grammar ==
=== Nouns ===
For nouns in Ghomara Berber, there are several common trends. The prefix a-, i-, or u- commonly identifies the masculine singular nouns in the language (i.e., arg'az “man”). For feminine singular nouns, there is both a prefix and a suffix such as ta-...-t (i.e., tarbat “girl”). This is the most common way to identify feminine singular nouns. Masculine plural nouns are characterized by i-...-en or i-...-an (i.e., irg'azen “men”). For feminine plural nouns, ti-...-an (i.e., tirbatan “girls”) is the most common circumfix.

=== Pronouns ===
Ghomara Berber uses personal, singular, and plural pronouns.

The first person singular pronoun nekkin is equivalent to "I" in English. The second person singular male pronoun kedžin and female pronoun kemmin is equivalent to "you" in English. Similarly, in Ghomara Berber, the third person singular male pronoun netta and female pronoun nettaθa is equivalent to him or her in English respectively.

The first person plural pronoun nuçna is equivalent to "we" in English and the second person plural pronoun kunna is equivalent to "you all" in English. Lastly, niçma is the third person plural pronoun equivalent to "they" in English, and is not distinguished by gender.

=== Verbs ===
In Ghomara Berber verbs contain certain affixes that characterize singularity, plurality, and point of view (POV). The following is an example of the verb conjugations for the English word "to write" or ara in Ghomara Berber:

		singular	plural
1st POV		ara-x	n-ara
2nd POV		t-ara-t	t-ara-m
3rd POV	Masculine	y-ara	ara-n*
3rd POV	Feminine	t-ara	ara-n*

=== Adjectives ===
Adjectives have either suffix -ø, which characterizes masculine singular nouns or -θ, which characterizes both feminine singular and all plural nouns. For example:

- Masculine singular: tayfur mellulø “the, a white table”
- Feminine singular: tamɣart mezziθ “the, a little woman”
- Masculine plural: irgazen muqqreθ “(the) big men”
- Feminine plural: timettutan muqqreθ “(the) big women”

== Vocabulary ==
An example of common English words in Ghomara Berber:

- targat: “dream”
- ahlan: “welcome, hello” (borrowed from Arabic)
- hemmam: “bathroom” (borrowed from Arabic)
- tamuda: “pig"
- lmakla: “food” (borrowed from Arabic)
- tanebdut: “summer”
- kama: “bed” (borrowed from Spanish)

== Numbers ==
Ghomara Berber uses a numerical system similar to many other languages. Cardinal numbers yan (“one”, masculine) and yat (“one”, feminine) are the only Berber numerals in Ghomara, while all the other cardinal numbers are borrowed from Moroccan Arabic (zuž (“two”), tlata (“three”), ɛišrin (“twenty”), tlatin (“thirty”), etc.).
