= Evgeniya Gutova =

Russian linguist (born 1985)

- Born: Russia
- Other name: Jenia Gutova
- Citizenship: Russian
- Education: Linguistics
- Notable work: Senhaja Berber Varieties: phonology, Morphology, and Morphosyntax
- Website: https://gutova.com/

Evgeniya Gutova also known as Jenia Gutova (born 1985) is a Russian linguist who specializes in Berber languages, and is interested in the Arabo-Berber bilingualism. She is best known for her PhD thesis in the polylectal grammar of Senhaja Berber (Northwestern Morocco).

== Bibliography ==
- Gutova, E. (2021). Senhaja Berber Varieties: Phonology, Morphology, and Morphosyntax. (Doctoral dissertation, Sorbonne Nouvelle University).
- Gutova, E. (2017). Clitic Pronouns in Ketama Berber (Western Rif). (Colloque International de Linguistique Berbère).
- Gutova, E. (2016). The Sanusi Creed in Kabyle Berber: Manuscript KA 21 from the Lmuhub Ulaḥbib Library (Béjaïa, Algeria). Études et Documents Berbères. 35-36 (1): 263–294.
