= Cannabis in Morocco =

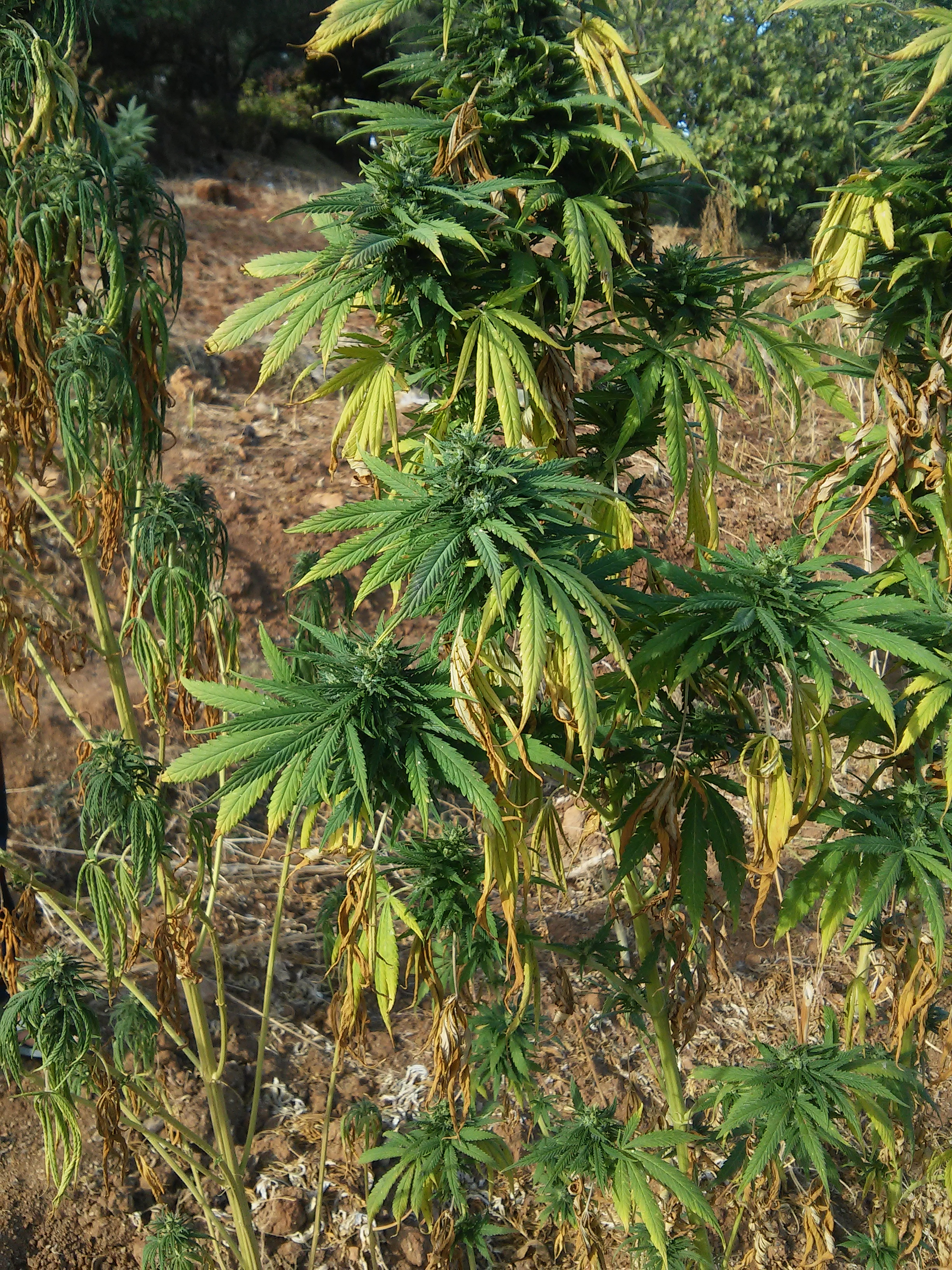
Cannabis in Fez, Morocco

Map showing cannabis cultivation areas in northwestern Morocco, 2003

Cannabis in Morocco has been illegal since 1956, a status reaffirmed by legislation on narcotic drugs adopted in 1974. However, its cultivation has long been established in certain regions of the country, particularly in the Rif, where it has been subject to de facto tolerance. Morocco remains one of the world’s leading producers of hashish.

In 2021, Law No. 13.21 on the licit uses of cannabis introduced a legal framework authorizing the cultivation, production, and use of cannabis for medical, pharmaceutical, and industrial purposes, under a system of licensing and state control. The implementation of this framework is entrusted to the National Agency for the Regulation of Cannabis-related Activities (ANRAC), established in 2022.

== History ==
=== Early history ===
The specific period of cannabis's original introduction to Morocco is unclear. From the sixteenth century it was grown nationwide on a small scale for local use, in gardens and orchards, but it was only in the 18th century that Morocco's Northwest region became a noted center of production, as it is now recognized in modern times. In 1890, Sultan Hassan I instituted strict regulations on cultivation and trade, but also conferred clear cannabis production privileges on several Rif tribes. During the early 1950s, the rights of those tribes to cultivate cannabis were reconfirmed, in response to tensions in the restive region. In 1956, King Mohammed V prohibited cannabis nationwide.

=== Internationalization ===
During the 1960s and 1970s, an influx of young Western tourists had a profound effect on cannabis in Morocco. Prior to this, cannabis was produced in small quantities, and smoked as kief, female flowers (unpollinated) mixed with black tobacco. In response to massive demand from tourists and smugglers, Moroccan growers adopted larger-scale techniques to replace artisanal ones. While there are competing legends as to how hashish production was first introduced to Morocco, it is widely believed to have occurred during the peak period of Western tourist influence.On 24 January 2023, the National Agency for the Regulation of Cannabis-related Activities (ANRAC) launched its website, through which it will be possible to request licenses to practice activities related to cannabis.

In 2024, Morocco began legal cannabis exports to Europe under a 2021 law allowing medical and industrial cannabis use, sparking substantial investment with around 200 active operators. During the second quarter, Morocco exported legally produced cannabis for the first time. This included 100 kilograms (220 lb) of resin, containing less than 1% THC (the compound responsible for psychotropic effects), sold for between 1,400 and 1,800 euros per kilogram, destined for Switzerland. Morocco's industry anticipated annual revenues of 400 to 600 million euros within four years, contingent on securing a 10% to 15% European market share. Moroccan firms like Bio Cannat have been reportedly processing cannabis for both export and local markets. Transitioning from illicit cultivation, Morocco has expanded legal cultivation areas to approximately 3,000 hectares, primarily in the northern Rif region. Challenges remain, including climate impacts and cost competitiveness versus European producers.

The ANRAC has advocated against using imported seeds, which require more irrigation, and promotes the preservation of the national variety beldiya using imported seeds, which require more irrigation, and promotes the preservation of the national variety beldiya, an early local cannabis variety needing less water, with planting starting in February. Previously uncertified, its legal production was impossible until the passing of the 2021 law permitting medical and industrial cannabis use.

== Production ==
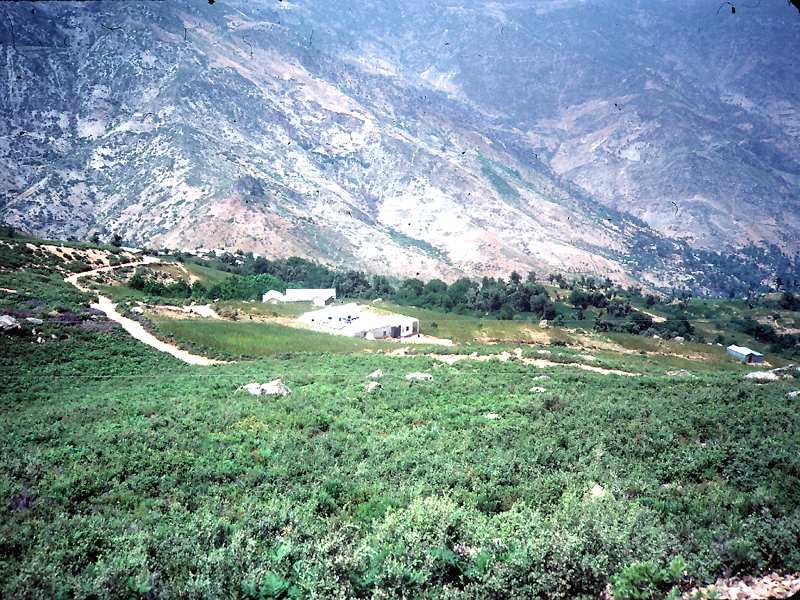
Cannabis fields in the Northwest, 1983

Morocco produces a substantial portion of the world's hashish; it was the top producer for the 2002–2010 period before a 2012 study placed Afghanistan as the top producer. Morocco's 2010 production was 760 tons of cannabis resin. In 2003, 70% of Europe's hashish consumed was produced in Morocco. In 2021, 73,000 hectares of land in Morocco was used to grow cannabis.

In traditional production, cannabis stalks are cut from the field in autumn and stored indoors to dry for a month. The cultivators then place the dried stalks onto a fine fabric stretched across a metal basin, and beat the stalks, causing the THC-laden trichomes to fall into the basin for collection. The first kif beaten from the stalks is of the best quality, and the stalks can be further beaten a second and third time, however, continuously producing a lower-quality product. Some of the trichomes are packaged as-is, or they can be repeatedly pressed and heated to form dense slabs of hashish. Hashish slabs are often marked with a signature emblem indicating its producers, such as an abstract design, number, or imitation of a commercial logo. These symbols have no standardization or consistency season-to-season, but serve in the short term to mark the current output of a given producer.

== Cannabis culture ==
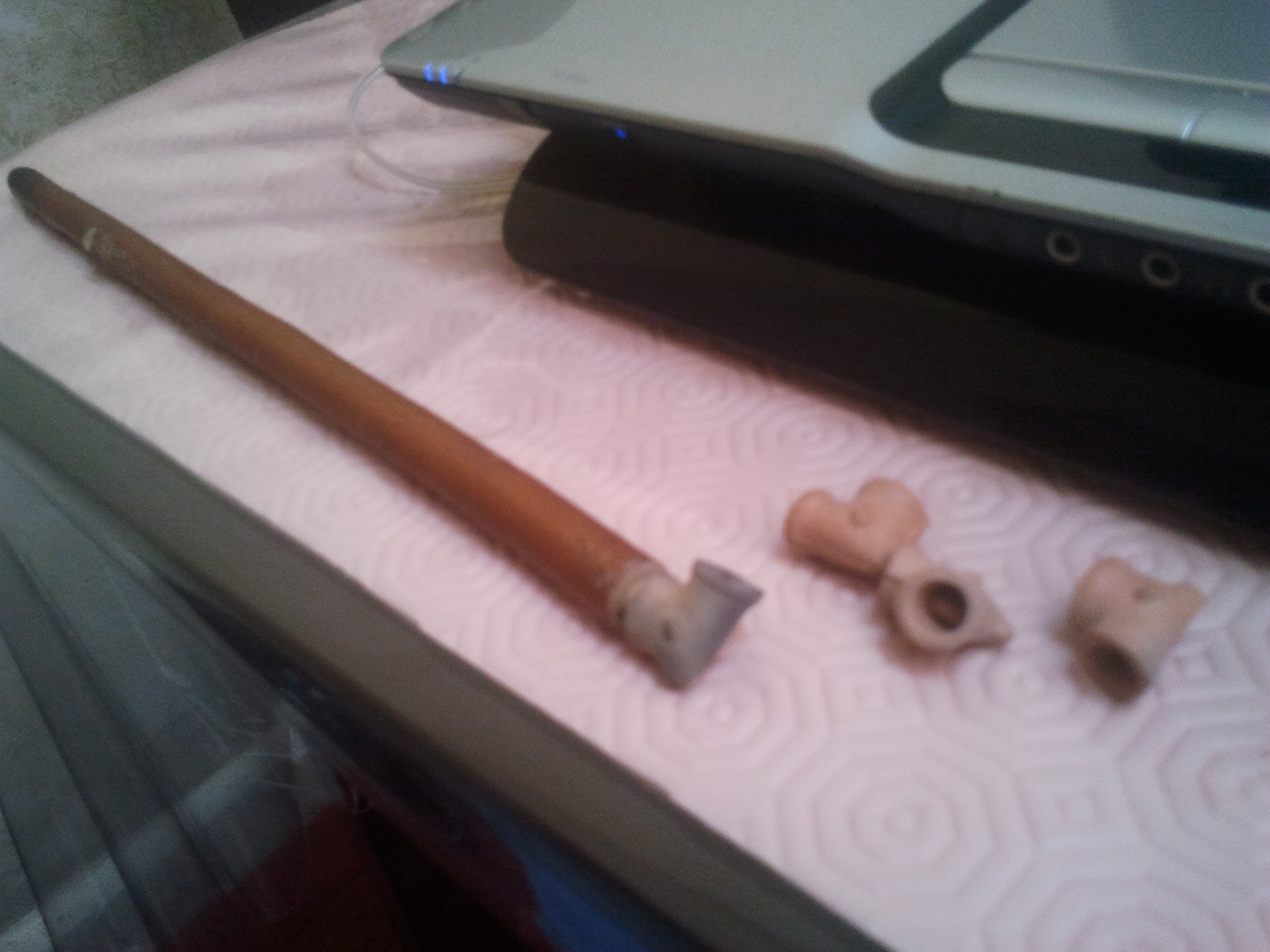
Sebsi pipe

=== Tourism ===
With the increasingly publicized worldwide consumption of cannabis, Moroccan citizens have capitalized on the feasibility of the production of this drug in the country's mountainous Northwest region, as well as the interest in cannabis from tourists. Parts of the region itself do not produce many other crops than kief (the Moroccan name for cannabis), creating ample space for tours of the region to take place. During recent decades, the city of Ketama has become a hub for cannabis tourism.

Cannabis tourism has grown to become an important and dominant source of wealth for growers, dealers, and unofficial tour guides alike. Tours are not officially advertised, and mostly occur by word-of-mouth. Hash pressing, tours, consumption of the drug, and sales are still illegal, but unofficially, the combination of these services has made the region one of the largest exporters of hashish, which is produced from female cannabis plants through compression and heating of resin glands known as trichomes. This cash crop has provided stable incomes and reliability for more than 90,000 households.

=== Economic use ===
As Moroccan law, officials continue to debate over the legality of producing cannabis for public use, production has started to become less criminalized. Recognizing that no other crops grow in the mountainous region, other than cannabis, the Moroccan government has been forced to allow farmers to continue their small production businesses. Producing hashish for European exports and visiting tourists provides a consistent form of employment and income for the farmers in the Rif region. Distribution costs and pricing vary depending on the location and proximity to large cities. The further a site of production is from cities, the fewer distributors are needed, thus allocating all funds from sales to the growers themselves. The surge of cannabis demand has also greatly increased the feasibility of the drug trade to remain a successful business throughout Morocco's ports and borders.

While acceptance for cannabis production is growing, so are price-inflation and the devaluation of farmers' crops. Taxes pose a threat to the security of income upon which growers rely as their means of economic gains.

=== Recreational use ===
Prior to the internationalization of the cannabis trade, Moroccan kif was consumed locally, smoked in a long sebsi pipe or mixed into food, and was also used occasionally in Sufi religious rituals. Majoun is also a popular traditional edible, a candy or jam made of cannabis with the combination of honey, chocolate, and various nuts that is ingested to feel the sensations similar to those of smoking cannabis.

== Legalization debate ==
Cannabis was banned in Morocco in 1956, however, the traditional tolerance for its production in the Jebala and Rif region, plus the recognition that cannabis makes up a large share of the national economy, has led to debate in favor of legalizing cannabis. In 2009, Fouad Ali El Himma received multi-partisan support amongst Moroccan politicians for his proposal to re-brand cannabis as a traditional Moroccan herbal remedy rather than a dangerous drug, and called for national debate and reduced prosecution of farmers. In 2014, the Party of Authenticity and Modernity proposed a draft law which would keep consumption of recreational cannabis illegal, but would license and regulate growers and redirect their output to licit medicinal and industrial cannabis products. While talks of legalizing cannabis in Morocco have been taboo for decades, it has become increasingly common to find discussion and support of the topic as of late. On 11 March 2021, the Moroccan government ratified a draft law to legalise the medical use of cannabis, to be finally approved by the parliament. On May 26, 2021, the Moroccan parliament voted to legalize the use of cannabis for medical, as well as cosmetic and industrial purposes. Recreational use however is still illegal. The legalization was confirmed by a second vote on June 16, 2021, after some adjustments to the law, proposed by the Chamber of Councillors.
