= Torres Castle =

Castle in Morocco

- Sanhaja Castle
- Al Hoceïma Province, Morocco
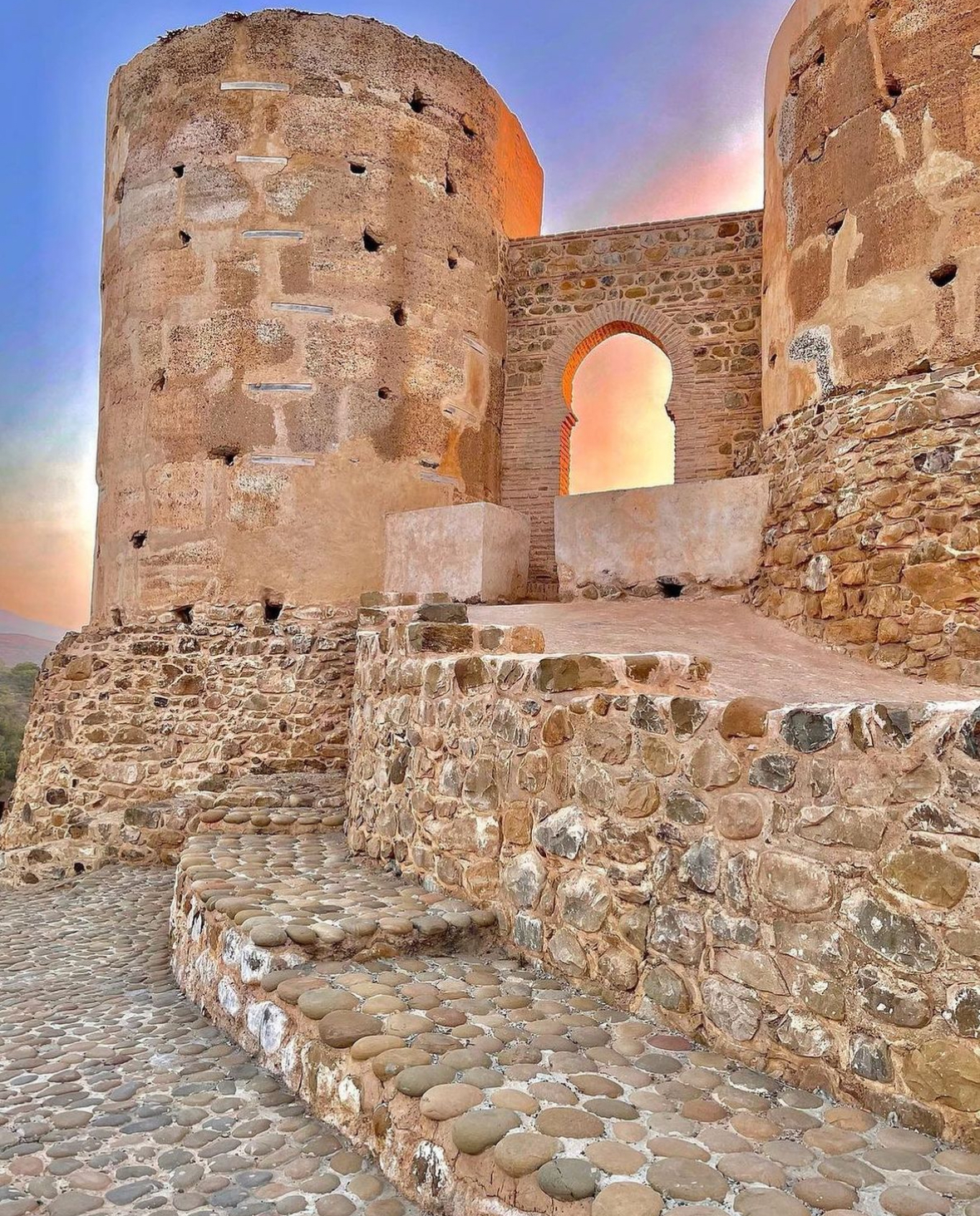

Site information
- Type: Castle

Location
- Location of the castle
- Coordinates: 35°09′24.6″N 4°19′28.3″W

Site history
- Built: 1499
- Built by: Manuel I of Portugal

Torres Castle (Spanish: Torres de Alcalá; Arabic: قلعة الطوريس), also known as Sanhaja Castle (Arabic: قلعة صنهاجة, romanized: Qal'at Ṣanhāǧa), is a historical fortress located in Bni Boufrah, on the Mediterranean coast of Northern Morocco.

The castle consists of five circular towers: four positioned in the four corners, and a fifth flanking the northern side of the entrance. It is believed to have been constructed in 1499 during the reign of Dom Manuel I of Portugal.
