= Monumento del Llano Amarillo =

Monument in Ceuta, Spain

Coordinates: 35°54′6″N 5°17′44″W

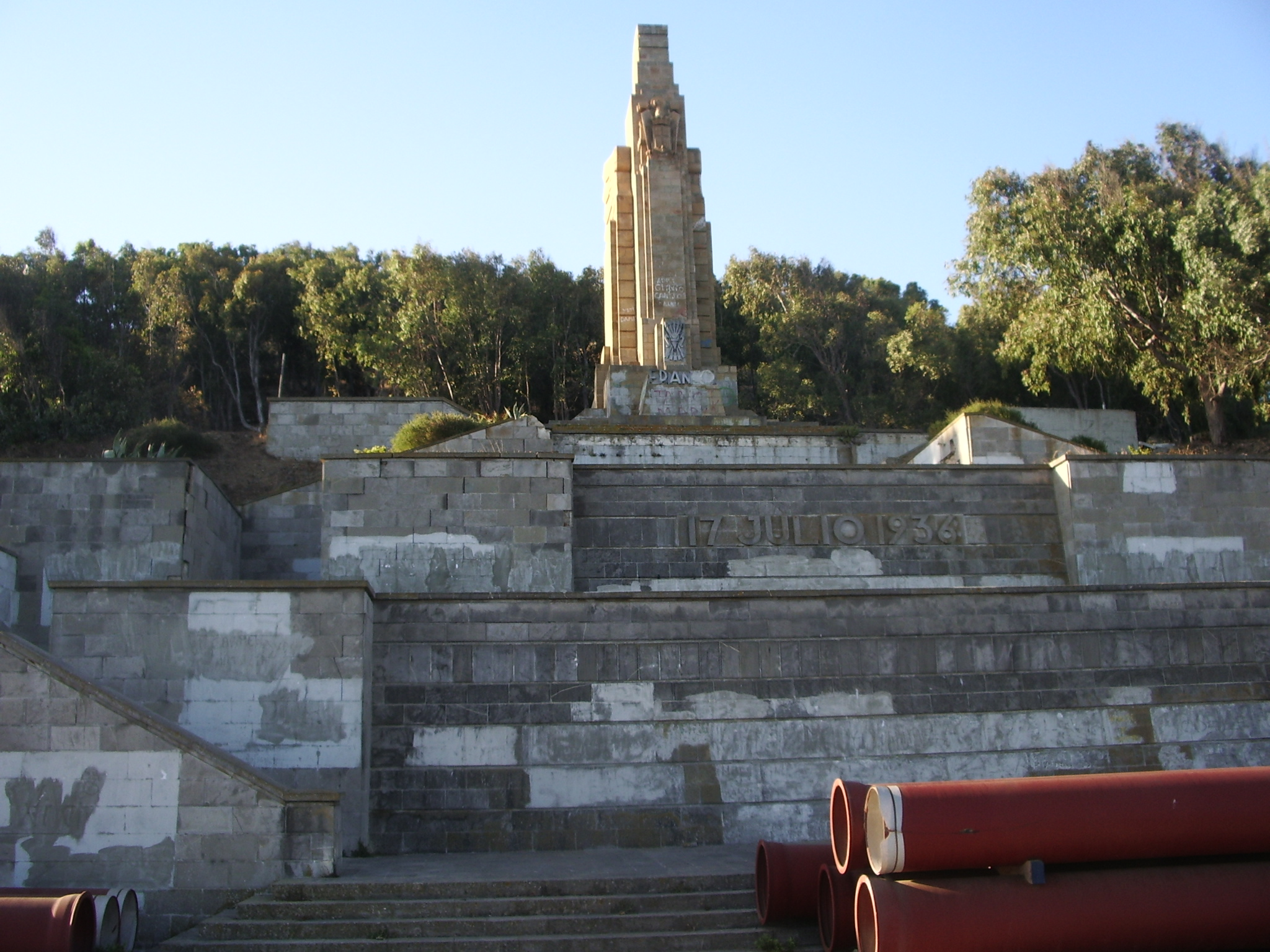
Monumento del Llano Amarillo

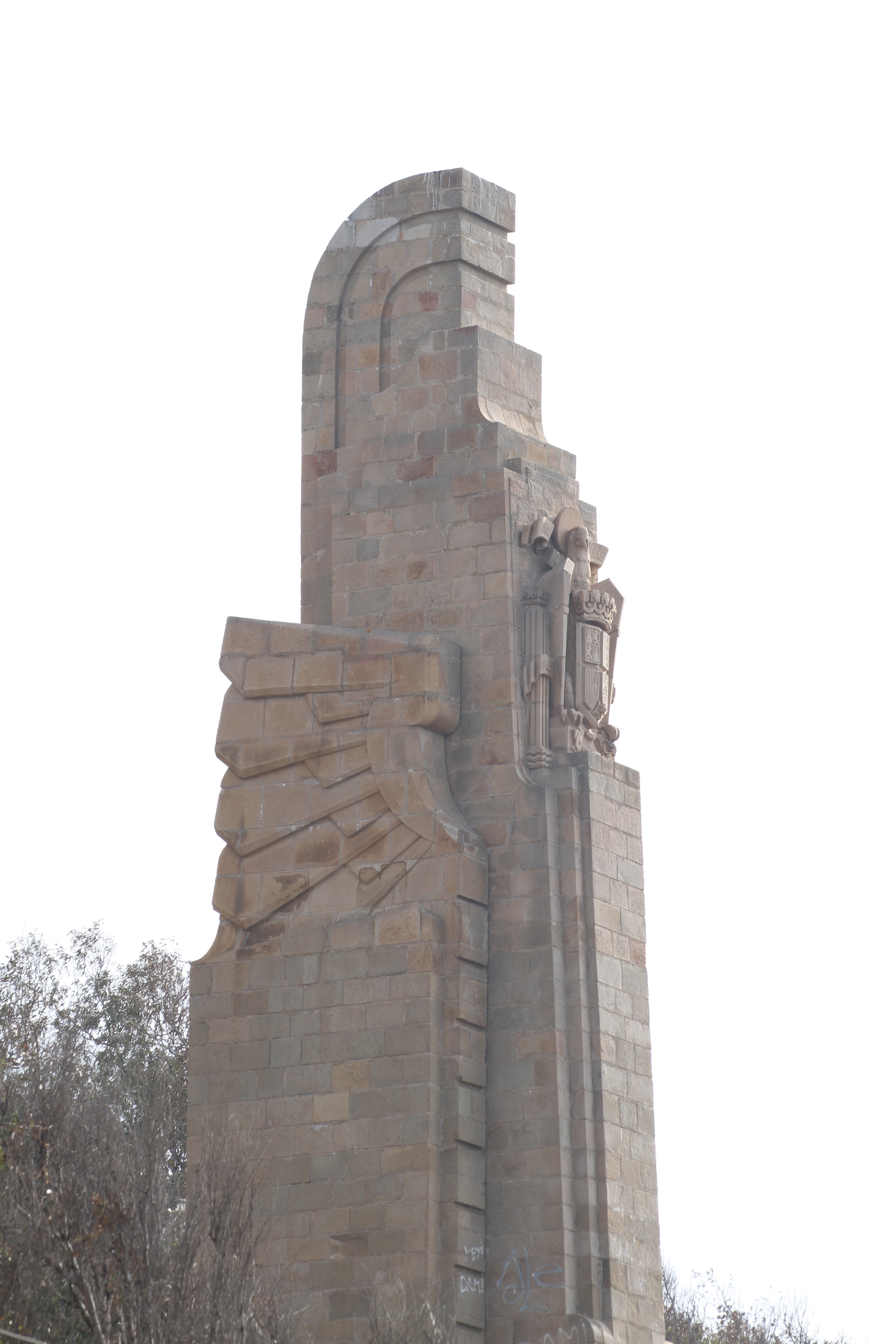
Detail of the monolith

Monumento del Llano Amarillo is a monument in the Spanish territory of Ceuta, in the North of Africa, at the bottom of Mount Hacho. The fifteen metre monument was moved here from Morocco in 1962 and it is one of the few sculptures left that record Spain's period of Nationalism following the Spanish Civil War.

== History ==
The monument records an "oath before the battle" made by generals, led by General Yagüe, involved in the conspiracy that gave rise to the Spanish Civil War on 12 July 1936. The monument was designed by the sculptor Bonifacio López Torvizco and the architect was Francisco Martínez Hernanz. It was unveiled on 13 July 1940 in Llano Amarillo, near Issaguen, in the Spanish Protectorate of Morocco (now independent Morocco). The monument is a symbol of the eventual defeat of the republican forces. The main monolith is fifteen metres high with stylized wings. General Yague led his troops across the Straits of Gibraltar from Ceuta. He joined up with other soldiers near Seville. Yague is a controversial figure as he is known to have killed thousands, including civilians and hospital patients, to avoid taking prisoners.

The work was damaged by a five-person team financed by the Catalan banker and exile Josep Andreu Abelló. The team used paint to create the message "Amnesty and Freedom", referring to Spanish political prisoners at that time.

In 1962, as a result of the independence of Morocco, the monument was moved to Ceuta. It was disassembled stone by stone in independent Morocco and it was then rebuilt at this location.

The monument is one of the few in Spain or its remaining overseas territories which commemorates the time when General Franco ruled Spain, and while it is still controversial there have been no recent attacks on the monument.
