= Atlas languages =

Northern Berber language subgroup of Morocco

- Geographic distribution: Atlas Mountains, Sous, Rif
- Linguistic classification: Afroasiatic: Berber; Northern; Atlas languages
- Subdivisions: Shilha; Central Atlas Tamazight; Senhaja de Srair; Ghomara; Lisan al-Gharbi †

Language codes
- Glottolog: atla1275

The Atlas languages are a subgroup of the Northern Berber languages of the Afroasiatic language family spoken in the Atlas Mountains and Rif Mountains of Morocco. By mutual intelligibility, they are a single language spoken by perhaps 14 million people; however, they are distinct sociolinguistically and are considered separate languages by the Royal Institute of Amazigh Culture. They are:

- Central Atlas Tamazight (Central Atlas Berber), spoken in the central Atlas Mountains.
- Shilha (Tashelhiyt; also rendered Tachelhit, Tasusit; includes Judeo-Berber), spoken in southern Morocco.
- Sanhaja de Srair (Senhaja Berber or Tasenhajit), spoken in the central part of the Rif.
- Ghomara, spoken in the western part of the Rif.
- Lisan al-Gharbi, formerly spoken in western Morocco.

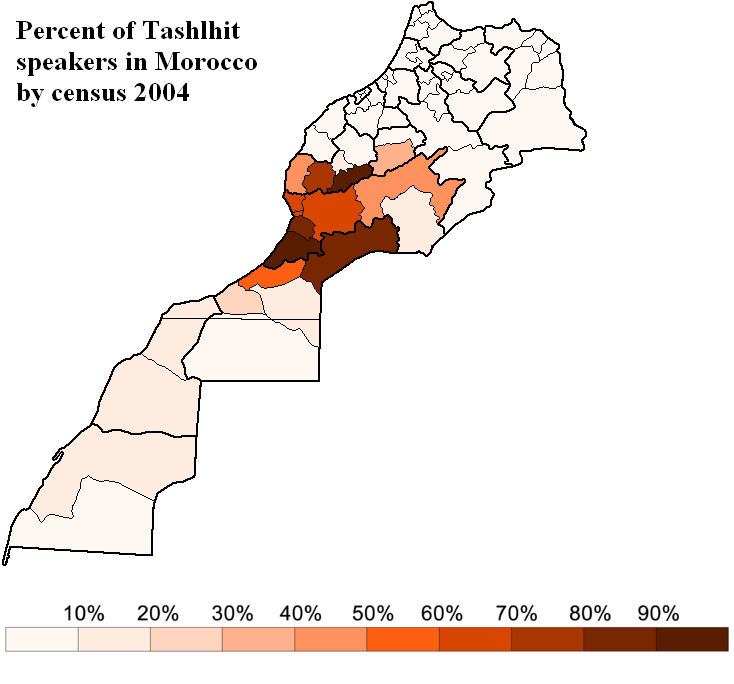
Percent of Tashelhit speakers (use in everyday's communication) in 2004

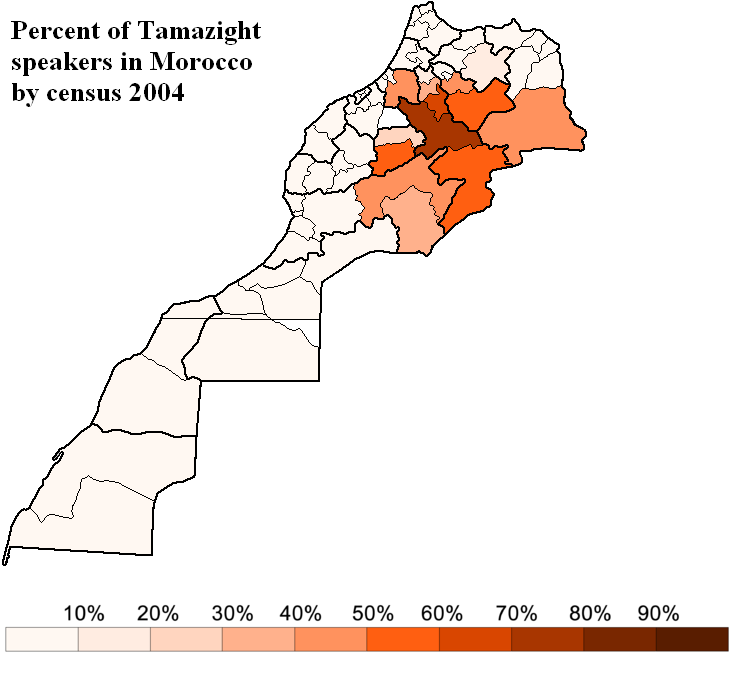
Percent of Central Tamazight speakers (use in everyday's communication) in 2004
