= Taghzout, Morocco =

Coordinates: 34°46′56.96″N 4°31′35.48″W

Taghzout Taɣzut
- Rural commune and town
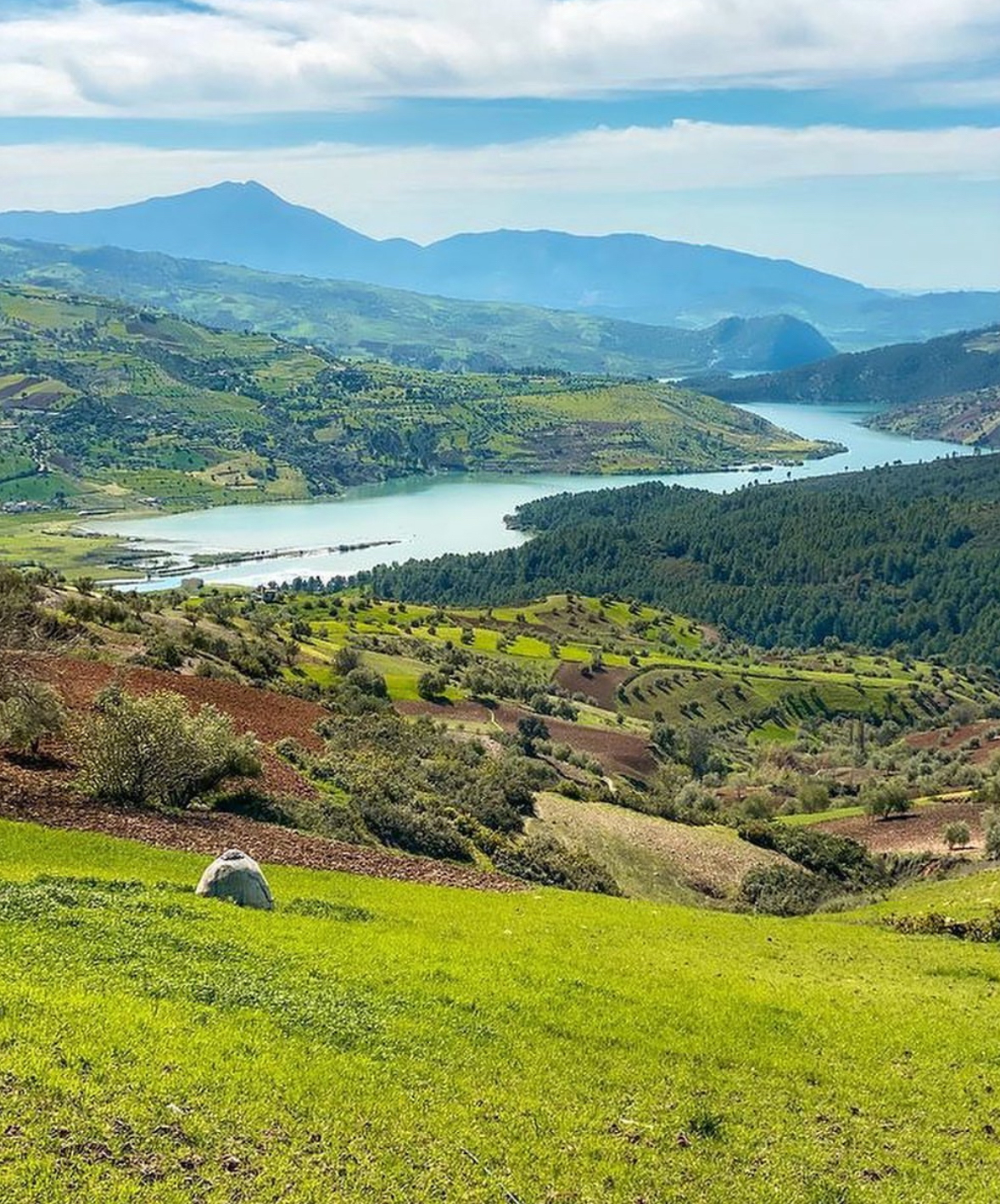
- Taghzout's landscape
- Interactive map of Taghzout
- Country: Morocco
- Region: Tanger-Tétouan-Al Hoceima
- Province: Al Hoceïma Province

Population (2004)
  - Total: 5,115
- Time zone: UTC+0 (GMT)

Taghzout (Senhaja De Srair: Taɣzut) is a small town and rural commune in Al Hoceïma Province of the Tanger-Tétouan-Al Hoceima region of Morocco. At the time of the 2004 census, the commune had a total population of 5115 people living in 912 households.
