= Abdelghaya Souahel =

Abdelghaya Souahel Ɛebdelɣaya Esswaḥel
- Rural commune and town
- Interactive map of Abdelghaya Souahel
- Coordinates: 34.7521°N 4.6573°W
- Country: Morocco
- Region: Tanger-Tétouan-Al Hoceïma
- Province: Al Hoceïma Province

Population (2014)
  - Total: 25,817
- Time zone: UTC+0 (GMT)

Abdelghaya Souahel (Senhaja De Srair: Ɛebdelɣaya Esswaḥel) is a small town and rural commune in Al Hoceïma Province of the Tanger-Tétouan-Al Hoceïma region of Morocco. At the time of the 2014 census, the commune had a total population of 25,817 people.
