= Sidi Heddi =

13th-century Moroccan Sufi leader

Sidi Heddi (Arabic: سيدي هدي) or Baba Heddi was a Moroccan marabout and founder of the Heddāwa sufi Islamic order, estimated to have lived in the 18th century (deceased 12 March 1803 in Jbel el-Alam).

He has been referred to as the "patron saint of kif (cannabis) smokers."

== See also ==
- Cannabis and religion
- Qutb ad-Dīn Haydar
