= Tamsaout =

Coordinates: 29°32′N 8°51′W

Tamsaout Tamsawt
- Rural commune and town
- Interactive map of Tamsaout
- Country: Morocco
- Region: Tangier-Tetouan-Al Hoceima
- Province: Al Hoceïma Province

Population (2004)
  - Total: 12,610
- Time zone: UTC+0 (GMT)

Tamsaout (Senhaja De Srair: Tamsawt) is a small town and rural commune in Al Hoceïma Province of the Tangier-Tetouan-Al Hoceima region of Morocco. At the time of the 2004 census, the commune had a total population of 12610 people living in 1817 households.
