= Moulay Ahmed Cherif =

Moulay Ahmed Cherif Bab-inu Ḥmed Eccrif
- Rural commune and town
- Interactive map of Moulay Ahmed Cherif
- Country: Morocco
- Region: Tangier-Tetouan-Al Hoceima
- Province: Al Hoceïma Province

Population (2004)
  - Total: 9,673
- Time zone: UTC+0 (GMT)

Moulay Ahmed Cherif (Senhaja De Srair: Bab-inu Ḥmed Eccrif) is a small town and rural commune in Al Hoceïma Province of the Tangier-Tetouan-Al Hoceima region of Morocco. At the time of the 2004 census, the commune had a total population of 9673 people living in 1292 households.
