= Zerkat =

Zerkat Zerqet
- Rural commune and town
- Location within Morocco Location within Africa
- Coordinates: 34.8961°N 4.3516°W
- Country: Morocco
- Region: Tanger-Tetouan-Al Hoceima
- Province: Al Hoceïma Province

Population (2004)
  - Total: 6,750
- Time zone: UTC+0 (GMT)

Zerkat (Senhaja De Srair: Zerqet) is a small town and rural commune in Al Hoceïma Province of the Tanger-Tetouan-Al Hoceima region of Morocco. At the time of the 2004 census, the commune had a total population of 6,750 people living in 1,048 households.
