= Bni Gmil =

Coordinates: 35°05′N 4°23′W

Bni Gmil بني جميل
- Rural commune and town
- Interactive map of Bni Gmil
- Country: Morocco
- Region: Taza-Al Hoceima-Taounate
- Province: Al Hoceïma Province

Population (2014)
  - Total: 9.513
- Time zone: UTC+0 (GMT)

Bni Gmil is a small town and rural commune in Al Hoceïma Province of the Taza-Al Hoceima-Taounate region of Morocco. At the time of the 2014 census, the commune had a total population of 9513 people.
