= Moroccan census =

The Moroccan Census of the population, (officially named in French Recensement Général de la Population et de l'Habitat; "General Census of the Population and the Habitat"; abbr. RGPH) is a census that takes place every ten years in the kingdom. It is carried out under the responsibility of the High Planning Commission.

== History ==
In Morocco under French protectorate or Spanish protectorate, counts were made irregularly from 1921 to 1951.

In 1960 (under Mohammed V), soon after the country gained independence, the first demographic census proper of the country was conducted. Five others followed, separated by nearly ten years: in 1971, 1982 and 1994 (under Hassan II), then in 2004, 2014 and 2024 (under Mohammed VI). Thus, since the 2000s, the RGPH has become more strictly decennial.

== See also ==
- Demographics of Morocco
