= Issaguen =

Issaguen Isagen
- Rural commune and town
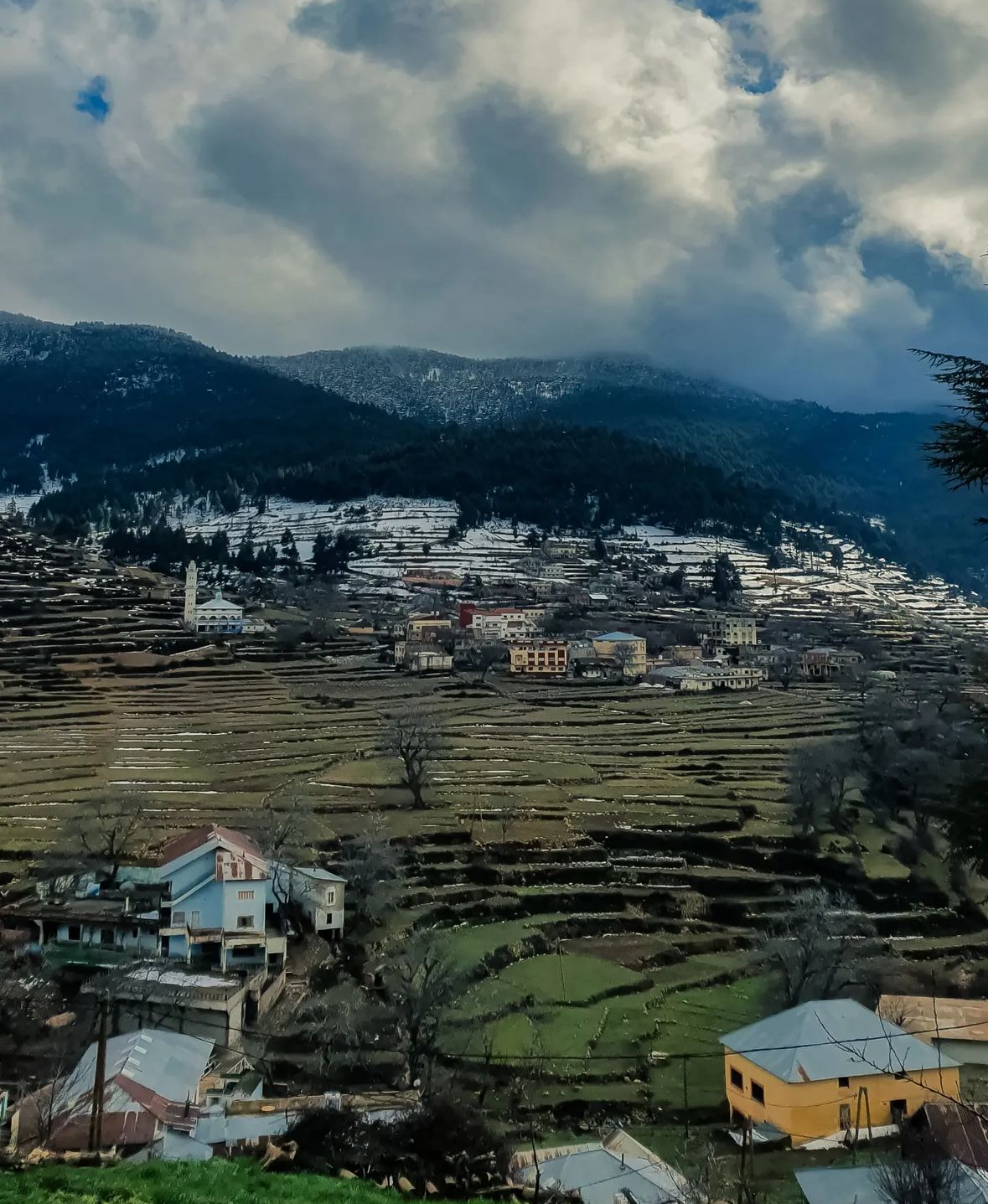
- Interactive map of Issaguen
- Country: Morocco
- Region: Tanger-Tetouan-Al Hoceima
- Province: Al Hoceïma Province

Population (2024)
  - Total: 17 832
- Time zone: UTC+0 (GMT)

Issaguen (Senhaja De Srair: Isagen), also known as Ketama, is a town in Al Hoceïma Province, Tanger-Tetouan-Al Hoceima, Morocco. According to the 2024 census it has a population of 17 832.

During the Spanish Protectorate, Issaguen was known as Llano Amarillo. It served as a military site for maneuvers in the Spanish Civil War, where Francisco Franco erected the Monument of Llano Amarillo in its honor. After the independence of Morocco, the monument was transferred to Ceuta in 1961.
