= Targuist =

Targuist Targist ⵜⴰⵔⴳⵉⵙⵜ
- Town
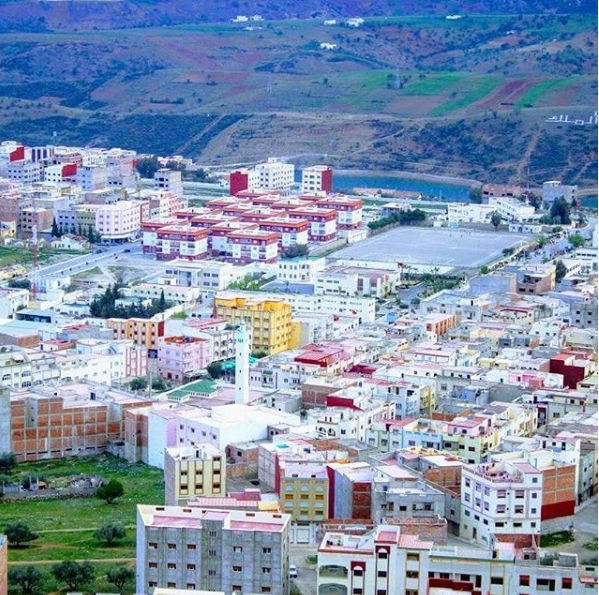

- Location within Morocco Location within Africa
- Coordinates: 34°57′N 4°18′W
- Country: Morocco
- Region: Tanger-Tetouan-Al Hoceima
- Province: Al Hoceïma Province

Population (2024)
  - Total: 14,638
- Time zone: UTC+0 (GMT)

Targuist (Senhaja De Srair: Targist) is a town in Al Hoceïma Province, Tanger-Tetouan-Al Hoceima, Morocco. According to the 2024 census, Targuist has a population of 14,638. It is also the cultural capital of the tribes of Senhaja Srair.

== Geography ==
The geographic and climatic context of Targuist is that of North Africa with a Mediterranean climate characterized by hot, dry summers with average temperatures above 22 °C and humid, rainy winters with mild temperatures. This province is very rich in both gymnosperm and angiosperm plants; highlighting the cork oak and olive trees and rosemary and, in some areas, chaparral.

Water has been drastically reduced in recent years due to population growth and the continuous migration of people from the countryside to the city in search of a better life. The city is supplied by a large lake located on the outskirts and which was dug several decades ago, at the same time as the city began to grow. Some people do not like the water because of its characteristic chlorine taste. The roads (two lanes) that connect with the city are in very bad condition. There are also several roads connecting to other villages: Beni Gmil, Bab Da Biyad.

Targuist is located at latitude: 34.938°, longitude: -4.319°, and elevation: 1103 m, in the Rif Mountains. The topography within 3 kilometers of Targuist has very large variations in altitude, with a maximum altitude change of 526 meters and an average altitude above sea level of 1084 meters. Within a 16 kilometer radius it contains very large variations in altitude (1872 meters). Within an 80 kilometer radius it also contains extreme variations in altitude (2448 meters). The area within 3 kilometers of Targuist is covered by cropland (38%), grassland (19%), shrubs (16%), and trees (16%), within 16 kilometers by cropland (31%) and grassland (22%), and within 80 kilometers by cropland (29%) and water (27%).

== Population ==
Population growth in Targuist has been relatively steady, with more noticeable increases in recent decades.

== Climate ==
In Targuist, the summers are short, hot, arid, and mostly clear and the winters are long, very cold, wet, and partly cloudy. Over the course of the year, the temperature typically varies from 1°C to 29°C (33°F) and is rarely below -3°C (31°F) or above 33°C (90°F). The mild season lasts for 2.6 months, from June 22 to September 10, with an average high daily temperature above 25°C (77°F). The hottest day of the year is July 30, with an average high temperature of 29 °C (84 °F) and an average low temperature of 16 °C (61 °F).

The cool season lasts for 4.1 months, from November 16 to March 21, with an average daily high temperature below 14 °C (57 °F). The coldest day of the year is January 18, with an average low temperature of 1 °C (33 °F) and an average high of 10 °C (50 °F).

== History ==
The city was the second capital (after Axdir) during the Republic of the Rif. It was here that Abd el-Krim was imprisoned by the French in 1926 after their surrender caused by the Al Hoceima landings.

It became known in 2007, after a corruption scandal involving the Royal Moroccan Gendarmerie, filmed by an amateur cameraman and broadcast on the YouTube video platform. It is twinned with Leganés.
