= Senhaja de Srair language =

Berber language

Senhaja de Srair
- Senhaja Berber, Tasenhajit
- Ccelḥa; Taṣenhajit
- Native to: Morocco
- Region: Rif (Ketama - Targuist)
- Ethnicity: Senhaja de Srair
- Native speakers: 86,000 (2014 census)
- Language family: Afro-Asiatic: Berber; Northern; Atlas; Senhaja de Srair
- Writing system: Berber Latin

Language codes
- ISO 639-3: sjs
- Glottolog: senh1238
- ELP: Senhaja de Srair
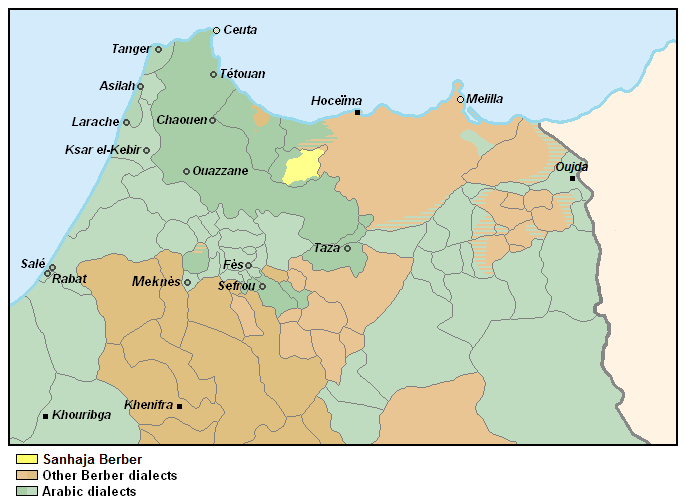

- Senhaja Berber is classified as Vulnerable by the Glottolog, and as Endangered by the UNESCO, Atlas of the World's Languages in Danger
- Coordinates: 34.830848°N 4.478343°W

Senhaja de Srair or Senhaja Berber (endonym: Ccelḥa or Taṣenhajit; Arabic: الصنهاجية, romanized: aṣ-ṣanhājiyah), is a Northern Berber language spoken by the Senhaja de Srair inhabiting the central part of the Moroccan Rif. It is primarily spoken in the districts of Targuist, Ketama, and Bni Boufrah, west of the Tarifit-speaking area in eastern Rif, by approximately 85,000 speakers.

Despite its geographical distribution, the language belongs to the Atlas branch of Berber. It has also been influenced by the neighbouring Riffian language.

== Name ==
Besides Senhaja de Srair, the language is also known in English as Tasenhajit, Senhaja Berber, Senhajiya, Shilha/Shelha, Shelha n Senhaja and Tamazight n Senhaja. The most widespread endonym to refer to their language is Ccelḥa 'Shelha'. If necessary, one can specify, depending on the (sub-)tribe: Shelha of Ketama, Seddat, Taghzut, etc., or simply "our Shelha". Some Senhaja de Srair Berber activists prefer the name Taṣenhajit, as the term Shelha can refer to other Berber languages as well.

- Person: Aṣenhaj (m. singular); Taṣenhajt (f. singular)
- People: Iṣenhajen (m. plural); Tiṣenhajin (f. plural)
- Language: Taṣenhajit

Senhaja de Srair speakers recognizes themselves using the ethnonym Iṣenhajen (masculine plural). Other forms of the ethnonym include Aṣenhaj (masculine singular), Taṣenhajt (feminine singular), and Tiṣenhajin (feminine plural).

== Language status ==
Senhaja de Srair, according to the UNESCO Atlas of the World's Languages in Danger, is an endangered language.

Senhaja de Srair speakers have limited participation in the Berber Cultural Movement. Their situation has been described as a form of marginalization within both the wider Berber-speaking community and Moroccan society as a whole. Their language lacks official recognition, since state language policies have primarily focused only on the three large Moroccan Berber varieties (Tashelhit, Middle Atlas Berber, and Tarifit). It is also excluded from the Moroccan Census of the population (RGPH), in addition to public media, including regional radio stations such as those in Al-Hoceima and Tetouan, the national Amazigh radio, Tamazight TV and the educational system.

This limited engagement has been attributed to several factors, including the geographic isolation in the Rif mountains and the broader socio-economic conditions (the region being associated with cannabis cultivation, reported social prejudice against them, and the lower visibility of the language compared with other Berber languages).

Recently, the association of "Amazighs of Senhaja of the Rif" has emerged in Targuist with the aim of promoting and preserving the Senhajan language and cultural heritage. It has played a role in the development of a distinct cultural and identity discourse among Senhaja de Srair speakers. Its members include Charif Adardak, Iliasse Aarab, Mounir Aghzennay, and Mohamed Ben Abdellah Aghzout. In addition to various cultural initiatives, the association created Tidighin, a magazine devoted to the cultural and linguistic heritage of Senhaja de Srair.

== Geographic distribution ==
Senhaja de Srair is native to the Rif Mountains (northwestern Morocco), and is spoken by more than 70,000 people in Al Hoceima province, notably in the districts of Targuist, Ketama and Bni Boufrah. To the east, it borders the areas where Tarifit is spoken, while to the west it is separated from Ghomara by an Arabic-speaking area. Senhaja Berber can be considered as a "bridge" between Ghomara Berber and Tarifit, as the three languages share many characteristics, despite the geographical distance.

Near the current Berber-speaking core of Senhaja de Srair, many communities continue to speak Tasenhajit. In Bni Gmil, in the Bni Chboun fraction, the villages of Bougherda, Belḥekk and Lmaẓiyyin; in the Maksouline fraction, Hajar dib, Jaber, Tazarin, and Tizi; and in the Toulout Ouesti fraction, Guellet, Isoummar, and Tilouli. In Bni Boufrah, Tasenhajit is spoken in the village of Akhzouz, and in the tribe of Mettioua, in the village of Tarejdalt. It is also attested in Zouaoua, a small village of the Fennassa tribe.

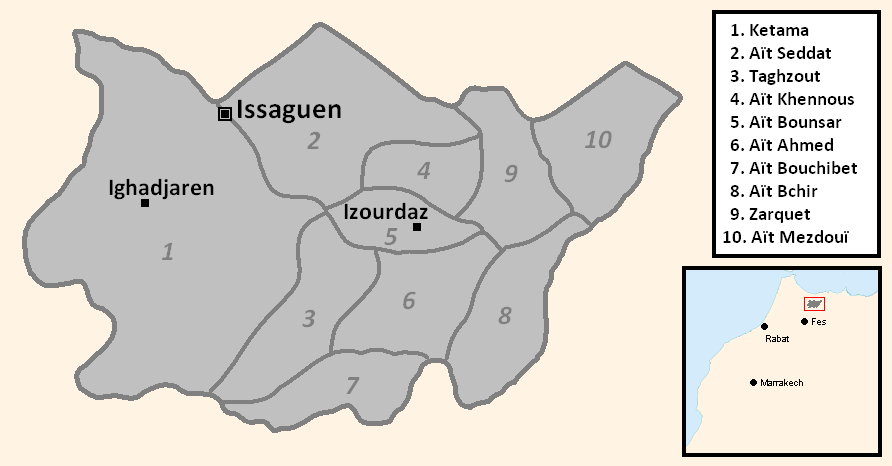
Senhaja de Srair tribes.

The prevalence of Senhaja de Srair spoken also varies among the tribes:

- Ait Ahmed: predominantly Berber-speaking, Arabic-speaking minority;
- Ait Bshir: predominantly Berber-speaking, Arabic-speaking minority;
- Ait Bunsar: entirely Berber-speaking;
- Ait Bushibet: entirely Arabic-speaking, except the village of Tarya;
- Ait Khennus: entirely Berber-speaking;
- Ait Mezduy: entirely Berber-speaking_{;}
- Ait Seddat: entirely Berber-speaking;
- Ketama: bilingual both Berber and Arabic speaking;
- Taghzut: entirely Berber-speaking;
- Zerqet: entirely Berber-speaking;

Estimated number of Senhaja de Srair speakers for each Senhajan tribe:
Tribe's name	Note	Estimated number of Tasenhajit speakers
Ketama	Mixed (Berber and Arabic speaking)	17.000
Ait Seddat	Majority Berber-speaking	17.000
Taghzut	Majority Berber-speaking	5.000
Ait Ahmed	Majority Berber-speaking	9.000
Ait Bunsar	Majority Berber-speaking	7.000
Ait Khennus	Majority Berber-speaking	9.000
Ait Mezduy	Majority Berber-speaking	10.000
Zerqet	Majority Berber-speaking	6.000
Ait Bshir	Majority Berber-speaking	6.000
Ait Bushibet	Majority Arabic-speaking	(-)
Total		85.000 speakers.

== Dialects ==
Senhaja de Srair exhibits significant internal dialectal variation. Its dialcets include Ait Ahmed, Ait Bshir, Ait Bunsar, Ait Khennus, Ait Mezduy, Ait Seddat, Ketama, Taghzut, and Zerqet.

The Ketama dialect is considered distinct from that of other tribes, and is now spoken only in seven villages: Ait Ahmed, Ait Aissi, Makhzen, Asammar, Talghunt, Sahel, and Zgara. In Ketama, Senhaja Berber is also spoken in the village of Ighumad, on the northern slope of Adrar Dahduh, but this sector of Ketama has its main contacts with the Berber speakers of Ait Seddat, which favoured the preservation of the language there.

Actual taxonomy of Senhaja de Srair according to the degree of intelligibility:
Pure Senhaja de Srair			Transitional Senhaja de Srair	
Eastern	Western	Southern	Northern	Southern
Ait Mezduy; Ait Bshir; Zerqet	Ait Seddat; Ait Khennus; Ait Bunsar	Ait Ahmed	Ketama	Taghzut

Each dialect has its own shifts such as:

- l > y / ǧ / r : A single *l usually undergoes changes in Senhaja, changing to y(y) in most varieties (Ketama/Seddat/Hmed/Bunsar), to ǧ(ǧ) in Taghzut, and to r(r) in Mezduy. A single *l is preserved in Zerqet.
- ll > ǧǧ : Long ll is preserved in Ketama, Hmed, as well as in Taghzut. Long ll > ǧǧ in Seddat, Bunsar, Zerqet, and Mezduy.
- g > y / w : Found in Hmed, Bunsar, Zerqet, and Mezduy.
- t > h / Ø : Found in Ketama and Taghzut.

Lexical differences
	Ketama	Taghzut	Seddat	Bunsar	Hmed	Zerqet	Mezduy	Dialectical shift
brother	gma	gma	gma	acqiq	acqiq	acqiq	acqiq	l > y / ǧ / r
sister	wiytma	weǧma	wiytma	tacqiqt	tacqiqt	tacqiqt	tacqiqt	l > y / ǧ / r
water source	tayya	taǧa	tahaya	tahaya	tahayya	tahala	tahara	l > y / ǧ / r
groom	aseyyi	aseǧǧi	aseyyi	aseyyi	asyi	asli	asri	l > y / ǧ / r
bride	aseyyit	tiǧǧit	taseyyit	taseyyit	tasyit	taslit	tasrit	l > y / ǧ / r
to slaughter	zyu	ǧǧu	zzyu	zzyu	zyu	zlu	zlu	l > y / ǧ / r
to be	yyi	iǧi	yyi	ili	iyyi	ili	iri	l > y / ǧ / r
become	aɣuy	aɣuǧ	aɣuy	aɣuy	ɣuy~ɣul	aɣul	aɣul	l > y / ǧ / r
donkey	aɣyuy	aɣyul	aɣyuy	aɣyuy	aɣyuy~aɣyul	aɣyul	aɣyur	l > y / ǧ / r
heart	uy	uǧ	uy	uy	uy	ul	ur	l > y / ǧ / r
friend	amdakkuy	amtakeǧ	amdakkʷi	amdakkʷi	amdakkʷi	amddakkʷel	amddakkʷer	l > y / ǧ / r
grapes	aḍi	aḍiǧ	aḍi	aḍi	aḍi	aḍil	aḍir	l > y / ǧ / r
speak	sawi	siweǧ	sawi	sawi	siwi	siwel	siwer	l > y / ǧ / r
forest	amayu	amaǧu	amayu	amayu	amayu	amalu	amařu	l > y / ǧ / r
almonds	lluz	lluz	ǧǧuz	ǧǧuz	lluz	ǧǧuz	ǧǧuz	ll > ǧǧ
yesterday	iḍelli	iḍelli	iḍeǧǧi	iḍeǧǧi	iḍelli	iḍeǧǧi	iḍeǧǧi	ll > ǧǧ
white	amelluy	amellul	ameǧǧuy	ameǧǧuy	amelluy	ameǧǧul	ameǧǧur	ll > ǧǧ
beans	llubiya	llubiya	ǧǧubiya	ǧǧubiya	llubiya	ǧǧubiya	ǧǧubiya	ll > ǧǧ
head	azellif	azellif	azeǧǧif	adeǧǧif	azellif	aǧǧif	azeǧǧif	ll > ǧǧ
yard	afrag	afrag	afrag	afrag	afray	afrag	afrag	g > y / w
pickaxe	agelzim	agelizm	agelzim	ayelzim	ayelzim	ayelzim	ayelzim	g > y / w
man	argaz	argaz	argaz	aryaz	aryaz	aryaz	aryaz	g > y / w
young bull	agenduz	agenduz	agenduz	ayenduz	ayenduz	ayenduz	ayenduz	g > y / w
mushroom	agursay	-	agursay	agersuy	awersal	agersul	agersul	g > y / w
mosque	mezgida	mezgida	timezgida	timezgida	timezgida	timezgida	timezgida	t > h / Ø
fig	azart	(h)azart	tazart	tazart	tazart	tazart	tazart	t > h / Ø

== Phonology ==
=== Vowels ===
There are three peripheral vowels (a, i, u) and a central vowel, schwa [ə], written as e. The vowel a is usually realized as [æ], i as [ɪ], u as [u], e as [ə].

	Front	Mid	Back
Close	i		u
Mid		ə	
Open		a	

When a peripheral vowel follows a pharyngealized consonant, it is lowered and retracted. The schwa is pronounced as [u] before w and as [i] before y. In word-final position, the sequences -ew frequently develop into -u, and -ey into -i.

- ew > u : sew > su (most Snh.) "Drink!"; ssew > ssu (most Snh.) "Irrigate!".
- el > ey > i : adfel (Zerqet) > adfey > adfi (most Snh.) "snow"; azzel (Zerqet) > azzey > azzi (most Snh.) "to run".

=== Consonants ===
Consonants
		Labial		Dental		Alveolar		Post- alveolar		Palatal	Velar		Uvular	Pharyngeal	Glottal
		plain	phar.	plain	phar.	plain	phar.	plain	phar.	Palatal	plain	lab.	Uvular	Pharyngeal	Glottal
Nasal		m				n									
Plosive	voiceless	(p)				t	tˤ	t͡ʃ			k	kʷ	q		(ʔ)
Plosive	voiced	b				d	(dˤ)	d͡ʒ			g	gʷ			
Fricative	voiceless	f		θ		s	sˤ	ʃ		ç	χ		ħ		
Fricative	voiced	β		ð	ðˤ	z	zˤ	ʒ	(ʒˤ)	(ʝ)	ʁ		ʕ	ɦ	
Approximant						l	(lˤ)			j		w			
Flap						ɾ	ɾˤ								

==== Consonant assimilations ====
Generally speaking, consonant assimilation is regressive, which means that a consonant is impacted by the sound that comes after it. The preverbal ventive clitic d is an exception to this pattern, deviating from the typical regressive behaviour.

Alveolar stops and post-alveolar fricatives are the consonants most frequently impacted by assimilation. Voicing assimilation is especially common. For instance, a voiced + voiceless sequence tends to become voiceless (e.g., d + t → t^t, ɣ + t → x^t), whereas a sequence of voiceless + voiced consonants usually produces a voiced result (e.g., t + d → d^d).

- d + t > tt : d + tamɣart > t^tamɣart 'It is a woman'.
- ɣ + t > x^t : zri-ɣ + ten > zri-x^ten 'I saw them'.
- t + d > dd : tadeggʷat 'evening', by deleting the prefix vowel a: tdeggʷat > ddeggʷat.

These procedures vary among dialects, though. Compared to Ketama and Zerqet, assimilation phenomena are generally less common in Hmed, particularly within the verbal complex.

===== Sibilants =====
Sibilant harmony is a type of Long-distance assimilation, in which sibilants often assimilate to each other.

- Assimilation to the postverbal negative marker c/ci/cay.
  u rrfus ci > u rrfuc^ci 'Do not knead!'.

===== Assimilation of n =====
The consonant n is special and can be assimilated in a variety of ways. It may assimilate to the following l, ll, r, ṛ, but does not assimilate to other consonants including m or b . This assimilation is optional and varies among speakers, as the assimilation to l/ll appears to be more widespread than to r/ṛ.

- 1P verbal subject prefix n- + l, ll, r, ṛ.
- The Genitive preposition n + l, ll, r, ṛ.
- Annexed state: n waman > w^waman 'of the water'.

==== Vocalic Sandhi ====
In Berber languages, two consecutive vowels are typically avoided. One of the following approaches is usually used to resolve such a sequence when it occurs:

1. one of the vowels is elided (vowel elision), e.g. a + a > a.
  i-nna + as > i-nna^s 'He said to him/her';
2. a semivowel is inserted (Hiatustilger), e.g. a + a > a ya.
  i-nna + as > i-nna^yas 'He said to him/her';
3. one of the vowels becomes a semivowel, e.g. a + i > a y.
  arba + inu > arba ynu 'my son';

== Writing system ==
Senhaja de Srair speakers are not used to writing in their language. Unlike some other Berber languages, Tifinagh script is never used in Tasenhajit. If the language is written, especially in the case on Computer-mediated communication, Latin script is the most considered one, numbers are sometimes (but not consistently) used to represent some sounds. The Berber Latin script:

The 35-Letter Alphabet of Northern-Berber
A	B	C	Č	D	Ḍ	E	Ɛ	F	G	Ǧ	Ɣ	H	Ḥ	I	J	K	L	M	N	O	Q	R	Ř	Ṛ	S	Ṣ	T	Ṭ	U	W	X	Y	Z	Ẓ
Lower case
a	b	c	č	d	ḍ	e	ɛ	f	g	ǧ	ɣ	h	ḥ	i	j	k	l	m	n	o	q	r	ř	ṛ	s	ṣ	t	ṭ	u	w	x	y	z	ẓ

== Grammar ==
=== Nouns ===
Senhaja Berber distinguishes two genders: masculine and feminine. As in most Berber languages, masculine nouns and adjectives generally start with a vowel (a-, i-, u-), while feminine nouns generally start with t- and end with a -t. e.g.

arba 'boy' vs. tarbat 'girl'.
aɣyul 'donkey' vs. taɣyult 'jennet'.

Senhaja Berber countable nouns distinguish a singular from a plural. Masculine plurals generally take the prefix i-, feminines ti-, and take the suffix -en in the masculine and -in in the feminine, e.g.

argaz 'man' vs. irgazen 'men'.
tacqiqt 'sister' vs. ticqiqin 'sisters'.

As in all Berber languages, the state distinction (or annexed state) is typically indicated only in the singular, and only for nouns whose stems begin with a. Most plural nouns and nouns whose stems begin with i or u~w do not show a distinction between states. In feminine singular nouns, the state distinction can be marked whether the noun begins with ta or ti, as the initial vowels may be dropped.

adrar → udrar 'mountain'
aman → waman 'water'
tamɣart → temɣart 'woman'
tisirt → tsirt 'mill'

=== Verbs ===
Verbs are conjugated for three tenses: The Aorist (a(d) + verb / (ma)c-a(d) + verb), it expresses a non-realized event (irrealis, future, uncertainty, possibility, probability, wish, conditional, prospective, subjunctive, etc.). The Perfective can express a dynamic event in the past, or a stative (including resultative) event. The Imperfective is used for the progressive, simultaneous, habitual, general, iterative, durative, etc.

Verb	Aorist	Perfective	Imperfective
to lift	asi	usi	ttasi
to enter	kcem	kcem	keččem
to find	af	ufa	taff

Senhaja subject affixes
Person		sg.	pl.
1		... -ɣ	n-...
2	m	t-... -d	t-... -m
2	f	t-... -d	t-... -mt
3	m	i/y-...	... -n
3	f	t-...	... -nt

The verb in Berber always agrees with the subject in gender and number, and is conjugated for person by adding affixes. e.g.

« i-kcem » – 'He entered.'
« t-kerz-ed » – 'You plowed.'

Verbs are always marked for subject and may also inflect for person of direct and indirect object. e.g

« i-ẓṛa^t » – 'He saw it.'
« i-nna^(ya)s i ḥmed » – 'He told Ahmed.'
« i-kka^(ya)s aɣrum i ḥmed » – 'He gave the bread to Ahmed.'

Verb derivation is performed by adding affixes. There are two types of derivation forms: causative and passive.

- Causative: obtained by prefixing the verb with s- / ss-:

ɣeṛ 'to study' → sɣeṛ 'to make study'
bedd 'to stop / stand' → sbedd 'to make stop / stand'
ani 'to ride' → ssani 'to make ride'.

- Passive: is obtained by prefixing the verb with t- / tt- / ttuya- / ttya- / ttwa- / n- / nn- / m- / mm- :

ẓẓu 'to plant' → tteẓẓu 'to be planted'
akʷer 'to steal' → ttuyakʷer, ttyaker, ttwakʷer 'to be stolen'
gzem 'to cut / hurt' → nnegzem 'to be cut / hurt'
ečč 'to eat' → mmečč 'to be eaten'.

Senhaja Berber usually expresses negation in two parts.The first (preverbal) negator can be u, ur, or ud. The second (postverbal) negator can be c, ci, or cay: the three are usually in free variation, the postverbal negator can be absent in certain contexts.

- u ẓṛiɣ c 'I did not see'.
- u kerzaɣ c 'I did not plow'.
- ud ufiɣ c 'I did not find'.

Berber verbal nouns are usually derived by adding often the nominal prefix a- or t- to the verb stem, just that the feminine verbal nouns are more concrete in their meaning.

- wareg 'to dream' → awareg 'dreaming' → tawargit 'a dream'.
- mger 'to harvest' → amger 'harvesting' → tamgra 'harvest'

=== Pronouns ===
Independent personal pronouns in Senhaja express person (first, second, and third), number (singular and plural), and gender (masculine and feminine).

Senhaja's Independant Personal Pronouns
	Ketama	Taghzut	Seddat	Bunsar	Hmed	Zerqet	Mezduy
1S	nek(k), nekki(n), nekkini	(nek(k)), nekki(n), nekkini	nek(k), nekkini, nekkinit	nek(k), nekki(ni)	nek(k), nekkini	nek(k), nekkini	nek(k)
2S	keǧ(ǧ), keǧǧi(n), keǧǧini	(keǧ(ǧ)), keǧǧi(n), keǧǧini	keǧ, keǧǧini	keǧ(ǧ), keǧǧini	keǧ(ǧ), keǧǧini	keǧ(ǧini), keǧ(ǧi(ni))	ker
2F	kem(m), kemmi(n), kemmini	(kem(m)), kemmi(n), kemmini	kem(m), kemmini	kem(m), kemmini	kem(m), kemmini	kem(m), kemmini	kem(m)
3MS	n(e)tta	ntta(n(i))	netta	n(e)tta(ni)	ntta(ni)	n(e)tta(ni)	netta
3FS	n(e)ttaha	nttaha(n)	nettata	ntata(ni)	nttata(ni)	ntata(n)	nettata
1P	nukni, nukki	nekni	nukni, nukna(ɣ)	nekni, nekna, nukni	nukni	nukni, nukna, wukna	nukni, nukna
2M	kunni	kenniw	kuni(mi), kenniwi	keniwi	kenniw(i)	kennami, kenniwi, kennawi	kenniw
2PF						kennamti kennumti, kennumi	(kennindi)
3MP	nehnim	(ne)hnim(i)	ntumi	nnimi, ntumi, numi	nehnam(i), nehnum(i)	ntumi, ntami	netnin
3FP						ntamti, ntumti	(netnindi)

Possessive pronouns are usually bound to the noun.

Senhaja's Possessive Personal Pronouns
Person		Singular	Plural
1st	m	-inu	-nneɣ, -nnaɣ, -nna
1st	f	-inu	-nneɣ, -nnaɣ, -nna
2nd	m	-k / -nnek	-nwen
2nd	f	-m / -nnem	-nwent
3rd	m	-s / -nnes	-nsen
3rd	f	-s / -nnes	-nsent

Examples:

- « gma-s » – 'His brother';
- « Axam-inu » – 'My house'.

There are three demonstratives: proximal, medial, and distal. Most dialects distinguish between masculine singular, feminine singular, and common plural forms. One may find many ways of expressing demonstratives, especially in pronominal form: -yya, -dda (proximal), and -nna, -yyen, -ddin (distal). eg.

- argaz-yya 'this man' ;
- argaz-nna, argaz-yyen 'that man' ;

== Arabic influence ==
Nearly all Senhaja de Srair speakers are bilingual, speaking both Berber and Moroccan Arabic. However, levels of bilingualism vary among speakers, with some individuals remaining more comfortable expressing themselves in Berber than in Arabic. The phenomenon of bilingualism is stronger in Western Senhaja than in Eastern Senhaja.

Senhaja Berber has undergone significant influence from Arabic. According to the Leipzig–Jakarta list, approximately 17% of the vocabulary of Senhaja de Srair consists of Arabic loanwords..

== Sample text ==
From the Ait Bshir sub-dialect in "Études sur les dialectes berbères des Beni Iznassen, du Rif et des Senhaja de Sraïr" by A. Renisio.

Aḥnuc n un taɣaṭ d un tkerret ag un uccen

Un taɣaṭ d un tkerret uɣulent timddukal. Qiment zedɣent marra. Tuɣul tkerret turu, tuǧǧad izimmar-nnes. Teɛda taɣaṭ as-tɣarreṣ ala bac ad tečč. Ami tuwweḍ tahala, tuli x tsukklet, tebda tɣarreṣ ala, teṭiyaḥid za akal.

Un uccen iffud, yusa-d ad isu. Ami-d yusa ad isu, iẓra tili n taɣaṭ i thala. Ineqqez g waman di thala ad t-yečč. Icuc icuc, u t-yufi. Iffeɣ-id zeg aman. Ɛawd yeɛda za tafukt, isummer ag uzeǧǧif-nnes, ictaf. Yuɣul za thala ɛawd isuqel, ɛawd iẓra-t, inna-s: Luxa nettata waha. Ineqqez, icuc, u t-yufi, ɛawd iffeɣ-id. Ami-d yaɣul ad ineqqez nuba nnaḍen, u taɣaṭ teɛayeḍ-as-d, tenna-yas-d u keǧǧini aca-nek? Ɣir tneqqazed g waman, ay tcuccud?

Ami as-tessiwel taɣaṭ, inna-yas netta: Kemmini dina? Ay tegged dina? Tenna-yas ttawiɣ cway wala i un tkerret tamdakult-inu turu, nzeddaɣ marra. Inna-s netta faywaqt ɣur-wen tesmya? Tenna-s nettata: nhar lḥad ɣur-neɣ ssabeɛ, addu za ɣur-neɣ ad teččed, ha nekk tɛaraḍeɣ-ak. Inna-s i uzeǧǧif-nnes. Ad ččeɣ taɣaṭ d imẓi-nnes, ad rnuɣ tikerret d izimmar-nnes. Yeɛda fḥal-s, yuǧǧa taɣaṭ tɣarreṣ, tuwi ala-nnes, tekka-s-t i tkerret ad tečč.

Teɛda taɣaṭ za ɣur uccay, tenna-yas: un uccen maca aɣen-yečč, s nukna s tarwa-nneɣ, ma-k yehda Rebbi aɣen-tfekked ziy-s. Inna-yas netta, ay-tesǧǧawanem tazikt, awent-henniɣ ziy-s. Yusa-d ikid-s za axxyam-nsent, ffren-t. Qelben xx-es taṣiḍut n tezgawt.

Uccen yusa-d iqqar tiɣmirin-nnes, iqqar ad nečč tikerret d urba-nnes nernu taɣaṭ d imẓi-nnes. Tenna-yas taɣaṭ, suqel, suqel ay da, tili n tṣiḍut-yya. Netta isɛella taṣiḍut, uccay ineqqez-id xx-es inɣa-t. Kkant-as tazikt aṛami iǧǧun, yeɛda fḥal-s.

English translation:

Story of a goat, a sheep and a jackal

A goat and a sheep became friends and lived together. When the sheep gave birth to a lamb, the goat went to fetch branches to feed her. Arriving at a stream, she climbed a tree and began cutting branches, letting them fall to the ground.

A thirsty jackal came to drink. As he was about to do so, he saw the goat’s reflection in the water. Thinking it was another goat, he jumped into the water to try to catch her. After searching in vain, he came out and lay in the sun to dry himself. He returned to the stream, looked again, and saw the goat once more. “This time it is truly her,” he said. He jumped in again, searched, and finding nothing, came out once more. As he was about to jump again, the goat called out to him: “What are you doing jumping into the water like that? What are you looking for?”

The jackal replied: “Ah, so you are there! And what are you doing up there?”. “I am collecting branches,” said the goat, “for a sheep friend of mine who has just given birth. We live together. ”The jackal asked: “When will the naming ceremony take place?”. “It will be on Sunday, on the seventh day after birth,” replied the goat. “Come and eat with us, I invite you.” The jackal thought to himself: “I will eat this goat and her kid, then the sheep and her lamb.” He left, while the goat continued gathering branches for the sheep.

The goat then went to the greyhound dog and said: “A jackal will eat us and our offspring. If God guides you, you can save us.” “Very well,” said the dog, “but you must feed me with milk.” They brought him to their home and hid him under an old basket.

The jackal arrived singing: “We will eat the sheep and her lamb, then the goat and her kid.” The goat said: “Look under this old basket.” The jackal lifted it, and the dog jumped on him and killed him. They fed the dog milk until he was satisfied, and he left peacefully

— A. Renisio

Note: The original text has been adapted into the modern Berber Latin script, with minor corrections to the original text.

== See also ==
- Senhaja de Srair people
- Tarifit
- Ghomara language

== Bibliography ==
- Evgeniya Gutova, Senhaja Berber Varieties: Phonology, Morphology, And Morphosyntax, 2021.
- Esteban Ibañez, Diccionario español-senhayi (dialecto beraber de Senhaya de Srair), 1959.
- Mena Lafkioui, Atlas linguistique des variétés berbères du Rif (Berber Studies vol.15), 2007.
- A. Renisio, Études sur les dialectes berbères des Beni Iznassen, du Rif et des Senhaja de Sraïr. Grammaire, textes et lexique. PIHEM, vol. 12. Paris 1932.
- Maarten Kossmann, La place du parler des Senhaja de Sraïr dans la dialectologie berbère, 2017.
- Abdellah Igalla, Les particules aspectuelles dans le parler amazigh des Senhaja Sraïr (Rif/ Maroc), 2021.
