= Bni Boufrah =

Coordinates: 35°06′N 4°19′W

Bni Boufrah Ait Boufrah
- Rural commune and town
- Interactive map of Bni Boufrah
- Country: Morocco
- Region: Tanger-Tétouan-Al Hoceïma
- Province: Al Hoceïma Province

Population (2014)
  - Total: 9,633
- Time zone: UTC+0 (GMT)

Ait Boufrah is a small town and rural commune in Al Hoceïma Province of the Tanger-Tetouan-Al Hoceima region of Morocco. At the time of the 2014 census, the commune had a total population of 9,633. From 1912 to 1956 it belonged to the northern area of the Spanish Protectorate of Morocco.

Known for its beaches, Cala Iris and Torres de Alcalá, which are a focus of tourism. The area has architecture of heritage and historical value. Beni Boufrah is an example of the cultural and natural wealth of the Rif, a region of historical and geographical importance in Morocco.

This region, like many others in the Rif, has played an important historical role in social and cultural movements, reflecting the resistance and identity of its inhabitants.

Beni Boufrah is a place where the Berber tradition is kept alive and is a point of interest for those who want to explore rural and authentic Morocco. The current leader is Tarik Chaara.
