= Ketama (Moroccan commune) =

Ketama Ikutamen
- Rural commune and town
- Interactive map of Ketama
- Coordinates: 34°52′36″N 4°37′09″W
- Country: Morocco
- Region: Tanger-Tetouan-Al Hoceima
- Province: Al Hoceïma Province

Population (2004)
  - Total: 15,924
- Time zone: UTC+0 (GMT)

Ketama (Senhaja De Srair: Ikutamen) is rural commune in Al Hoceïma Province of the Tanger-Tetouan-Al Hoceima region of Morocco, with Tlata Ketama as its center. At the time of the 2004 census, the commune had a total population of 15,924 people living in 2,444 households.
