= Bni Bouayach =

Bni Bouayach ⴰⵢⵜ ⴱⵓⵄⵢⴰⵛ
- Town
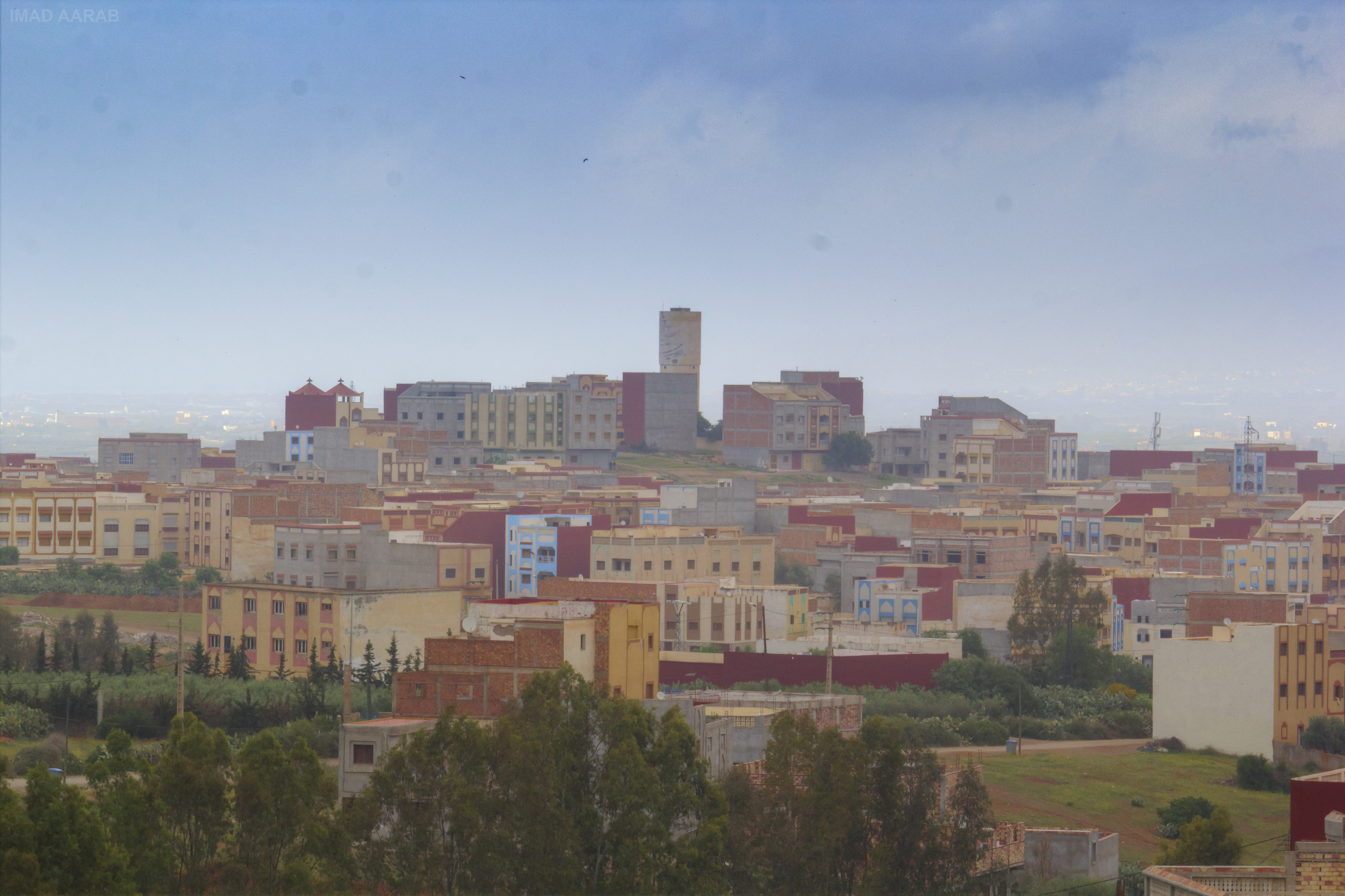
- Bni Bouayach in 2015

- Location within Morocco Location within Africa
- Coordinates: 35°5′55″N 3°50′23″W
- Country: Morocco
- Region: Tanger-Tetouan-Al Hoceima
- Province: Al Hoceïma Province

Government
  - Type: Municipal council
  - Mayor: Said Akrouh

Area
  - Total: 12 sq mi (30 km^{2})
- Elevation: 130 ft (40 m)

Population (2024)
  - Total: 20,013
  - Density: 2,397/sq mi (925.6/km^{2})
- Time zone: UTC+0 (GMT)
- ZIP code(s): 32050
- Area code: +212
- Website: m-bnibouayach.com

Bni Bouayach is a city in Al Hoceïma Province located in the region of Tanger-Tetouan-Al Hoceima, Morocco. Bni Bouayach is the third largest city in Al Hoceima province. The inhabitants are of Riffian-Amazigh origin. At the 2024 census, it had a population of 20,013.

== Toponymy ==
Bni Buɛyac (in Arabic) or Ayt Buɛyac (in Riffian Berber) means "sons of Buɛyac".

== Geography ==
Bni Bouayach is located in the region of Tanger-Tetouan-Al Hoceima in Al Hoceima Province. Bni bouayach borders the city Imzouren to the north and Rural Commune Nekkour with Tifarouine to the South. To the east it borders the Rual Commune of Louta. The city is connected through the highway M2.

== Education ==
There is offered some basic education in the city that consists of Primary, Secondary and High School. The city also offers a technical school or technical college with diploma in the fields of masonry, electricity and carpentry.

== Healthcare ==
The city of Bni Bouayach is served by a public and some private clinics.

== Popular sites ==
Azrou Zhi'tha is the name of the tallest mountain in this town and is a popular site for mountain hikes.

== Transport ==
Bni Bouayach is served by taxi within the city and also connected with other cities.

== Sport ==
The city offers sport facilities.
