= Al Hoceima National Park =

National park in Morocco

- IUCN category II (national park)
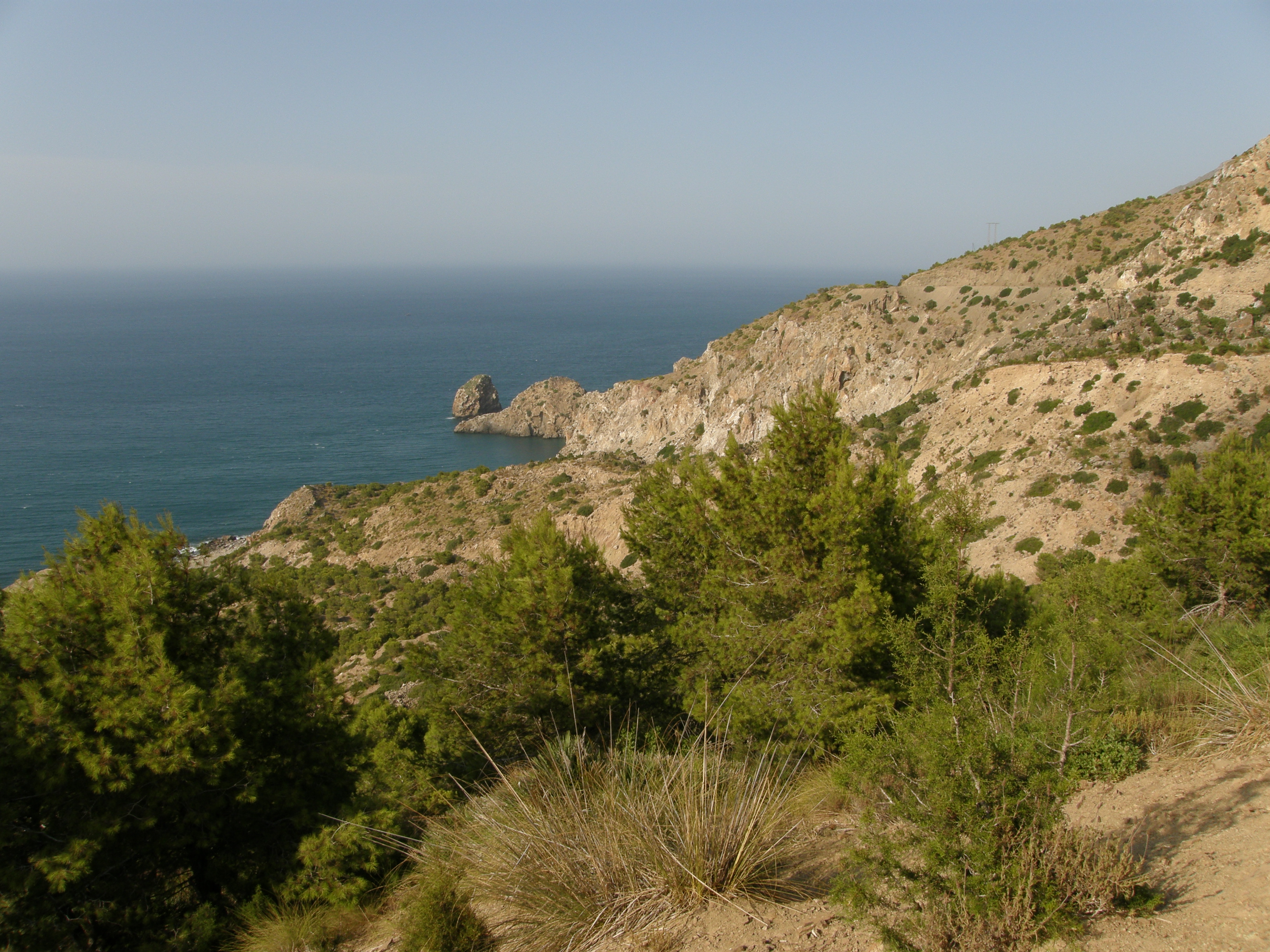

- Location within Morocco
- Location: Morocco
- Coordinates: 35°12′05″N 04°09′56″W
- Area: 470 km^{2} (180 sq mi)
- Established: 2004

Al Hoceima National Park (Arabic: المنتزه الوطني للحسيمة, Tarifit: Afrag Anamur n Lhusima) is a national park located outside the town of Al Hoceima in Morocco. It covers an area of 480 km^{2} (185 sq mi), including 196 km^{2} (76 sq mi) of sea. The park was created in 2004 and is managed by the Haut-Commissariat des eaux et forêts et de la lutte contre la désertification.

== Geography ==
Bordered on the north by the Mediterranean coast on 50 km and south by the National road 16, Al Hoceima National Park is home to some of the most unspoilt coastal sites on the north coast of Morocco, as well as high cliffs and a mountainous interior. It covers an area of 480 km^{2} (185 sq mi), which includes a terrestrial part (284 km^{2} (110 sq mi)), located on the Ibaqouyen Rif mountain range, and a part located at sea (196 km^{2} (76 sq mi)). Its terrestrial part consists of the partial territories of five communes which are, from west to east, the coastal municipalities of Bni Boufrah, Senada, Rouadi and Izemmouren (between Bni Gmil and Al Hoceima), as well as Ait Kamara, to the south of Izemmouren.

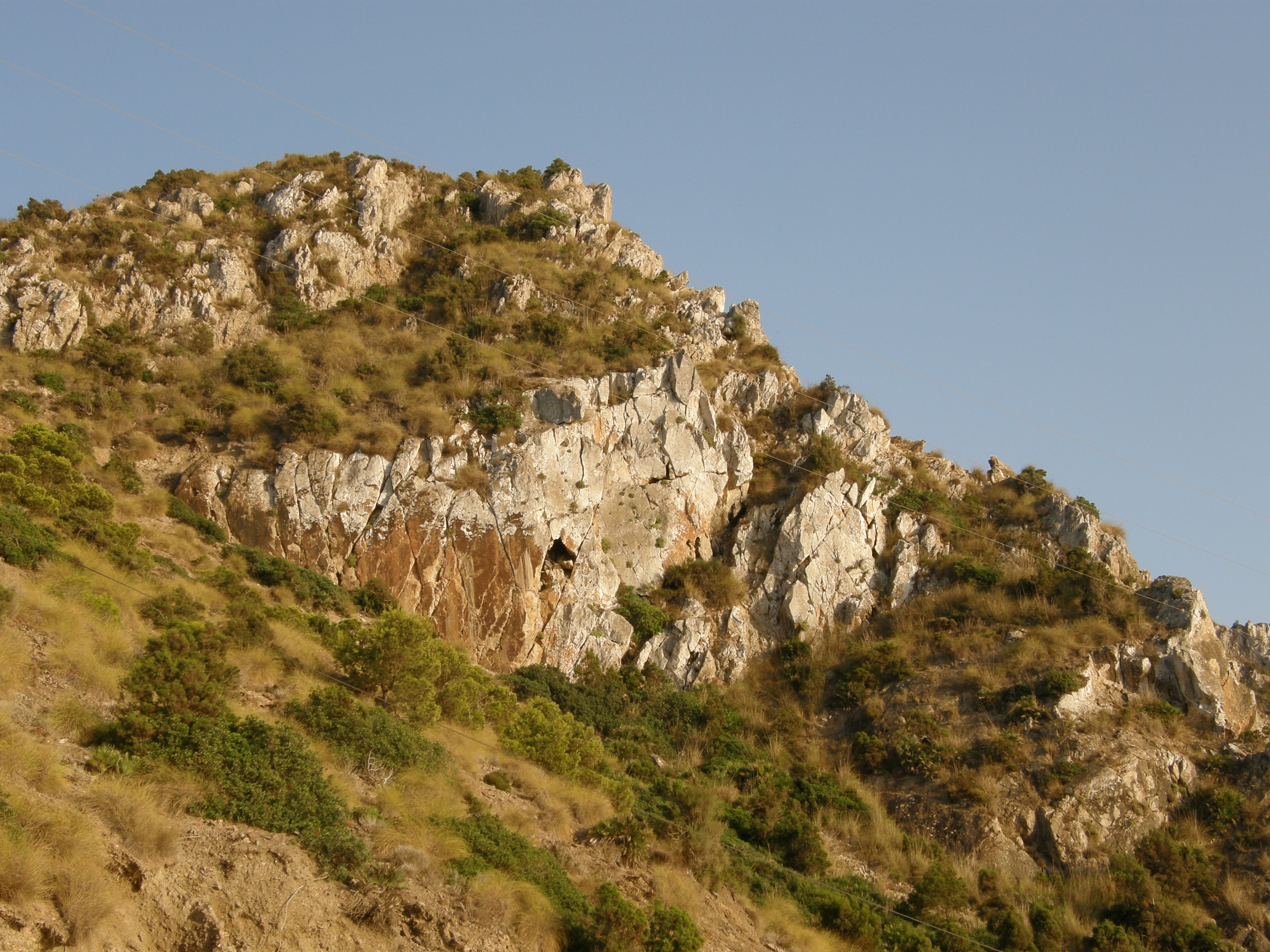
Cliffs at Al Hoceima National Park

The park is characterised by high limestone cliffs and a wild rocky coast that has experienced little exploitation over the years.

== Flora ==
One hundred and ten species of vascular plant have been recorded in the national park. Among the trees present are the barbary thuya, the Aleppo pine, the lentisk, the wild olive, the carob tree, the Kermes oak, the green oak, the Mediterranean dwarf palm and the jujube. Between the cliffs and rocks are shrubs and grasses, providing a variety of habitats for wildlife.

The marine zone is influenced by both the Mediterranean Sea and the Atlantic Ocean. It is dominated by forests of Cystoseira sp., Saccorhiza polyschides, Laminaria ochroleuca, Laminaria rodreguizii, Phyllariopsis purpurascens and Phyllariopsis brevipes, with 264 species of seaweed having been recorded.

== Fauna ==
Among the many species of seabirds, there is a large colony of ospreys. The waters of the Mediterranean are home to three species of dolphin: the common dolphin, the common bottlenose dolphin and the striped dolphin. The sea caves sometimes provide shelter for the endangered Mediterranean monk seals. The loggerhead sea turtle, the leatherback sea turtle and the green sea turtle feed in the area, and over a hundred species of fish have been recorded here, as well as the rare giant ribbed Mediterranean limpet (Patella ferruginea).
