= Cala Iris Islet =

Island in Morocco

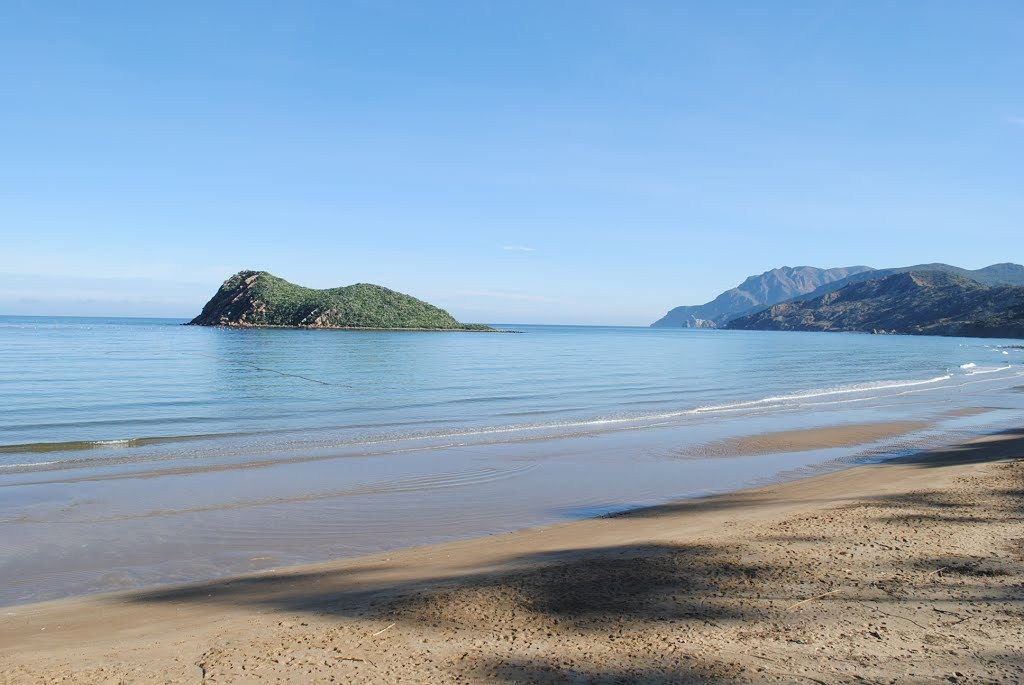

- Location within Morocco

Geography
- Location: Alboran Sea
- Coordinates: 35°09′08″N 4°21′36″W

Administration
- Morocco
- Province: Al Hoceima Province

Demographics
- Population: 0

Cala Iris Islet is a small island in Morocco, located in the Alboran Sea in the bay of the Cala Iris village, Al Hoceima Province. It is about 500 m off the Cala Iris beach. This island is a part of the Al Hoceima National Park. Cala Iris Islet is one of the few places where the ribbed Mediterranean limpet (Patella ferruginea) has survived, with a population of 110 specimens.
