= Imzouren =

Imzouren إمزورن
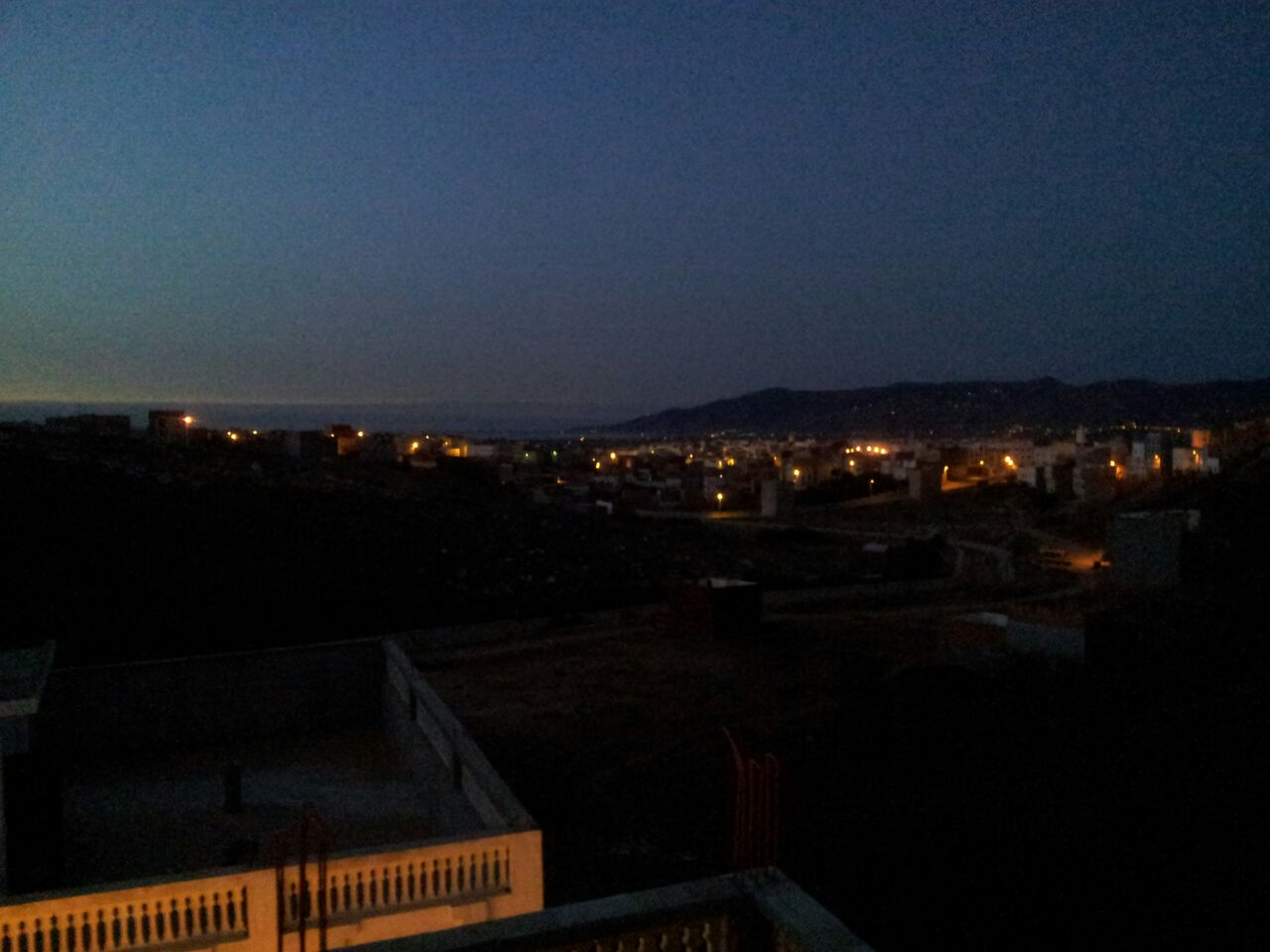
- The Nekor area, in the suburbs of Imzouren, in the city of Al Hoceima, is characterized by tranquility and serenity with its rural distinction.

- Location in Morocco Imzouren (Africa)
- Coordinates: 35°9′N 3°51′W
- Country: Morocco
- Region: Tanger-Tetouan-Al Hoceima
- Province: Al Hoceïma Province
- Time zone: UTC+0 (GMT)

Imzouren (Arabic: إمزورن) is a town in the north of Morocco. It is located near the city of Al Hoceima and now stretches almost to the town of Bni Bouayach. The inhabitants of Imzouren are Riffians. The February 2004 Al Hoceima earthquake occurred near Imzouren and registered 6.3 on the moment magnitude scale. At least 564 people died there, with over 250 people wounded. According to the 2014 census, the city has a population of 33,852.
