= Faissal Boulakjar =

Dutch politician (born 1979)

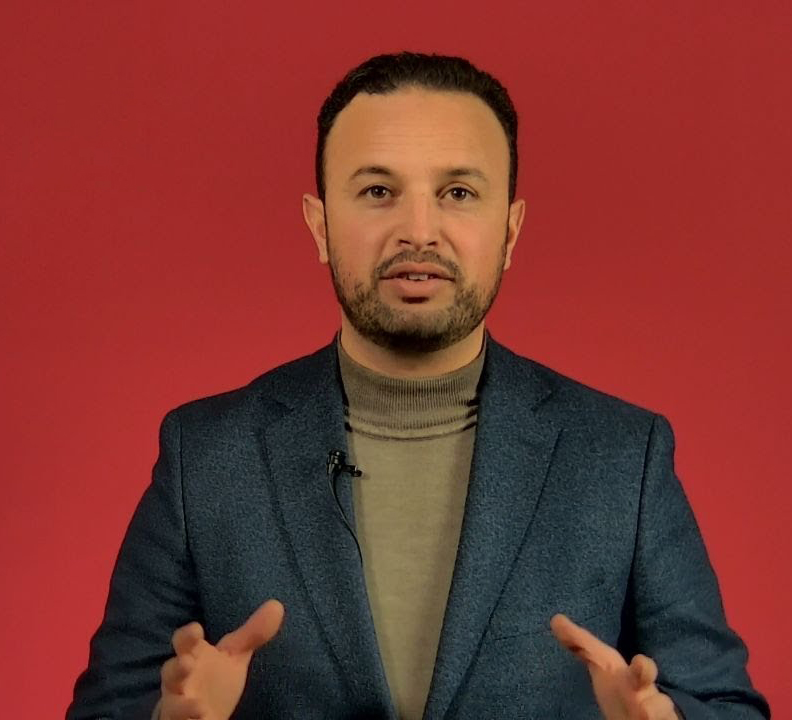

Member of the House of Representatives
- In office 31 March 2021 – 5 December 2023

Member of the Breda municipal council
- In office 27 March 2014 – 1 April 2021
- Succeeded by: Bart Lauwen

Personal details
- Born: F. Boulakjar; 28 April 1979 (age 47) Tifarouine, Morocco
- Party: Democrats 66
- Children: 3
- Education: Spectrum College

Faissal Boulakjar (born 28 April 1979) is a Moroccan-born Dutch politician, who has been serving as a member of the House of Representatives since the 2021 Dutch general election. He is a member of the social liberal party Democrats 66 (D66) and previously held a seat in the Breda municipal council (2014–2021).

== Early life, education, and career ==
Boualkjar was born in 1979 in the Moroccan village Tifarouine and has six older siblings – three brothers and three sisters. His family emigrated to the Netherlands in 1983 after his father had moved there in 1966 to work in a factory of the snack brand Nibb-it. He grew up in the Breda neighborhood Heusdenhout. Between 1993 and 1998, Boulakjar attended the secondary school Olof/Florijn College at mavo level before studying facility management at Spectrum College until 2004. He would later also earn an hbo degree.

He was a security guard at the Breda retirement home Raffy in the years 2004–06 and subsequently worked as a youth worker for Surplus Welzijn. He also helped organize free futsal training for disadvantaged children next to his job. Boulakjar became a reintegration adviser in 2011 but left that position the following year to work as a personal injury adviser until 2018. Thereafter, he served as an independent trainer and adviser and as an adviser of the program Samen Ouder Worden (Getting older together), which promotes volunteering for elderly people.

== Politics ==
Boulakjar joined Democrats 66 in 2009 because of the rise of populism and was elected to the Breda municipal council in the 2014 municipal election. His specializations were youth, education, sports, and sustainability, and he became his party's vice caucus leader one year later. He was re-elected in the 2018 municipal election as D66's third candidate, remained vice caucus leader, and served as the party's spokesperson for construction, housing, climate, security, and the region. In 2019, Boulakjar and councilors from the Labour Party wrote a policy paper, in which they called for solving problems in the vulnerable district Hoge Vucht. He also served as manager of D66's campaign in the Breda region for three elections in 2018 and 2019.

He ran for member of parliament in the 2021 general election, being placed sixteenth on D66's party list. Boulakjar was installed as House member on 31 March after he had been elected with 2,875 preference votes. He vacated his seat in the Breda municipal council the following day. Within his caucus, his specializations were housing, spatial planning, railways, and public transport. The latter two were later in his term replaced by mining and the reinforcement of houses in Groningen to survive earthquakes caused by gas extraction. Boulakjar is a member of the parliamentary Committees for Agriculture, Nature and Food Quality; for Economic Affairs and Climate Policy; for Infrastructure and Water Management; and for the Interior; and he is on the Benelux Interparliamentary Consultative Council. A motion by Boulakjar and Fahid Minhas (VVD) was passed in 2023 compelling the cabinet to investigate prohibiting the splitting of agricultural land into smaller plots. Het Financieele Dagblad had reported that these lands were being bought to be divided into plots that could potentially be used for residential construction and sold to investors with a significant profit. However, the newspaper noted that construction of housing had been rare on those plots. In August 2023, a judge determined that these investments should be within the purview of the Netherlands Authority for the Financial Markets.

== Personal life ==
While a member of parliament, Boulakjar moved from Teteringen to Breda, which is located nearby. He has a wife called Bouchra, and he has two sons and a daughter.

== Electoral history ==
Electoral history of Faissal Boulakjar
Year	Body	Party	Pos.	Votes	Result		Ref.
Year	Body	Party	Pos.	Votes	Party seats	Individual	Ref.
2021	House of Representatives	Democrats 66	16	2,875	24	Won	
2023	House of Representatives	Democrats 66	14	1,412	9	Lost	
