= Arbaa Taourirt =

- Rural commune and town
- Interactive map of Arbaa Taourirt
- Coordinates: 34°55′55″N 3°50′09″W
- Country: Morocco
- Region: Tanger-Tétouan-Al Hoceima
- Province: Al Hoceïma

Population (2014 Farid)
  - Total: 5,187
- Time zone: UTC+0 (GMT)

Arbaa Taourirt is a small town and rural commune in Al Hoceïma Province of the Tanger-Tétouan-Al Hoceima region of Morocco. According to the 2014 census, the commune had a total population of 5187 people living in 985 households. The town holds a weekly market every Wednesday. It is best known for the historic site of Kelaat Arbaa Taourirt, also known as Fousina, a castle erected in the 1940s by Spanish colonial authorities. Several families have emigrated to European countries.
