= Zaouiat Sidi Abdelkader =

Zaouiat Sidi Abdelkader زاوية سيدي عبد القادر
- Rural commune and town
- Location within Morocco Location within Africa
- Coordinates: 34.9183°N 4.1288°W
- Country: Morocco
- Region: Tanger-Tetouan-Al Hoceima
- Province: Al Hoceïma Province

Population (2004)
  - Total: 5,974
- Time zone: UTC+0 (GMT)

Zaouiat Sidi Abdelkader is a small town and rural commune in Al Hoceïma Province of the Tanger-Tetouan-Al Hoceima region of Morocco. At the time of the 2004 census, the commune had a total population of 5974 people living in 938 households.
