= Bni Hdifa =

Bni Hadifa بني حذيفة
- Rural commune and town
- Location within Morocco Location within Africa
- Coordinates: 35°01′22″N 4°08′27″W
- Country: Morocco
- Region: Tanger-Tetouan-Al Hoceima
- Province: Al Hoceïma Province

Population (2004)
  - Total: 2,061
- Time zone: UTC+0 (GMT)

Bni Hadifa or Ait Hdifa is a town in Al Hoceïma Province, Tanger-Tetouan-Al Hoceima, Morocco. According to the 2004 census it has a population of 2061.
