= Bni Bchir =

Bni Bchir Ayt Bcir
- Rural commune and town
- Location within Morocco
- Country: Morocco
- Region: Tangier-Tetouan-Al Hoceima
- Province: Al Hoceïma Province

Population (2004)
  - Total: 5,959
- Time zone: UTC+0 (GMT)

Bni Bchir (Senhaja De Srair: Ayt Bcir) is a small town and rural commune in Al Hoceïma Province of the Tangier-Tetouan-Al Hoceima region of Morocco. At the time of the 2004 census, the commune had a total population of 5959 people living in 851 households.
