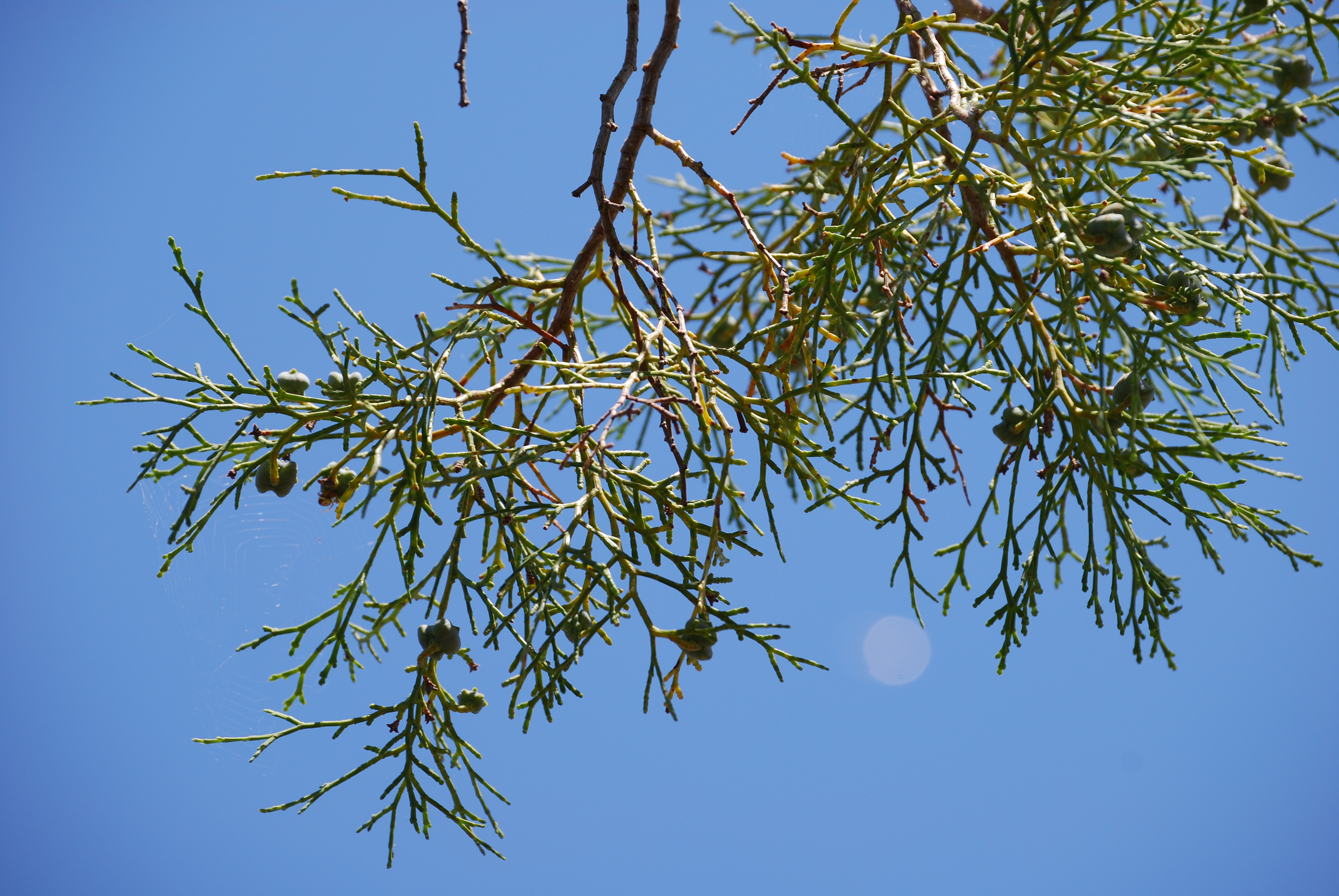

Conservation status
- Least Concern (IUCN 3.1)

Scientific classification
- Kingdom: Plantae
- Clade: Tracheophytes
- Clade: Gymnosperms
- Division: Pinophyta
- Class: Pinopsida
- Order: Cupressales
- Family: Cupressaceae
- Subfamily: Cupressoideae
- Genus: Tetraclinis; Mast.
- Species: T. articulata

Binomial name
- Tetraclinis articulata (Vahl) Mast.
- Natural range

Synonyms
- Callitris quadrivalvis Rich. & A.Rich.; Thuja articulata Vahl

= Tetraclinis =

Genus of conifers

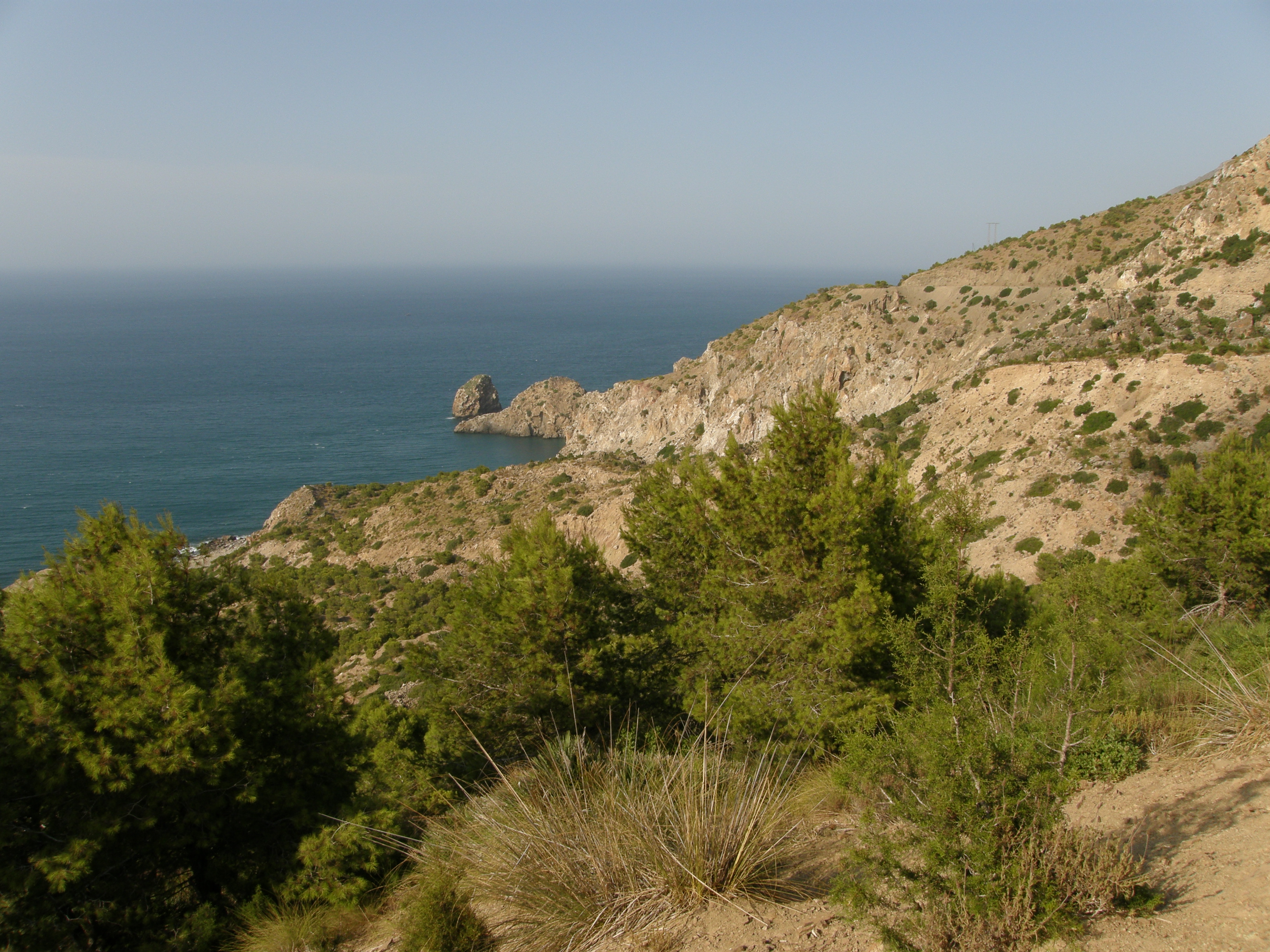
Tetraclinis forest at Al Hoceima National Park

Tetraclinis (also called arar, araar or Sictus tree) is a genus of coniferous trees in the cypress family Cupressaceae, containing only one species, Tetraclinis articulata, also known as Thuja articulata, sandarac, sandarac tree or Barbary thuja, endemic to the western Mediterranean region, particularly in southern Europe and North Africa.

== Distribution and habitat ==
It is native to northwestern Africa in the Atlas Mountains of Morocco, Algeria, and Tunisia, with two small outlying populations on Malta, and near Cartagena in southeast Spain in Europe. It grows at relatively low altitudes in a hot, dry subtropical Mediterranean climate. The species has reportedly become an invasive species in the eastern Mediterranean drylands. The genus once had a much broader range during the Oligocene–Miocene, with some species occurring in North America.

== Taxonomy ==
Its closest relatives are Platycladus, Microbiota, and Calocedrus, with the closest resemblance to the latter. In older texts, it was sometimes treated in Thuja or Callitris, but it is less closely related to those genera.

== Description ==
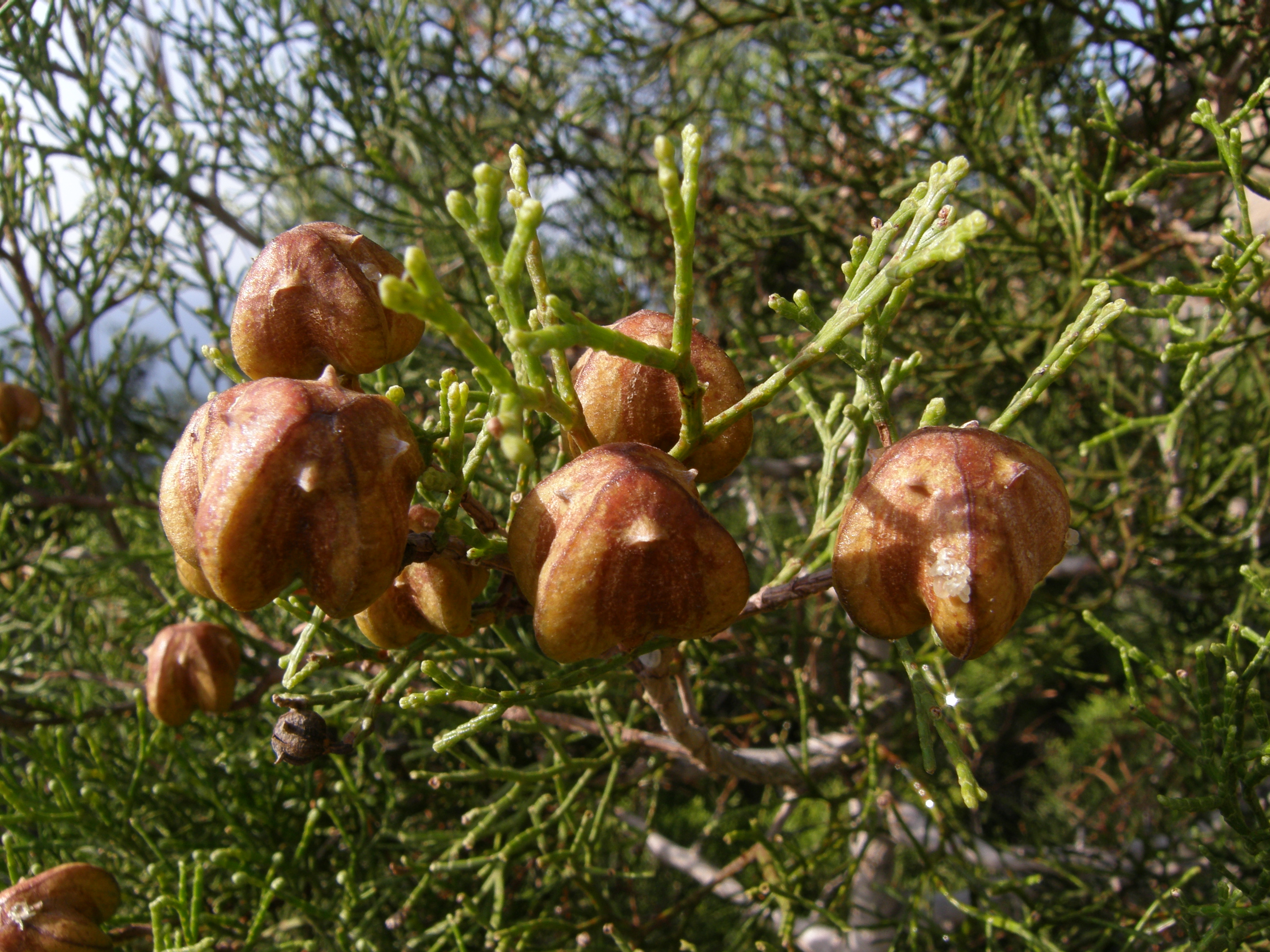
Tetraclinis cones at Al Hoceima National Park

It is a small, slow-growing tree, to 6–15 m (rarely 20 m) tall and 0.5 m (rarely 1 m) trunk diameter, often with two or more trunks from the base. The foliage forms in open sprays with scale-like leaves 1–8 mm long and 1–1.5 mm broad; the leaves are arranged in opposite decussate pairs, with the successive pairs closely then distantly spaced, so forming apparent whorls of four. The cones are 10–15 mm long, green ripening brown in about 8 months from pollination, and have four thick scales arranged in two opposite pairs. The seeds are 5–7 mm long and 2 mm broad, with a 3–4 mm broad papery wing on each side.

It is one of only a small number of conifers able to coppice (regrow by sprouting from stumps), an adaptation to survive wildfire and moderate levels of browsing by animals. Old trees that have sprouted repeatedly over a long period form large burls at the base, known as lupias.

== Uses and symbolism ==
It is the national tree of Malta, where it is known as għargħar (derived from the Arabic عَرْعَر ʿarʿar). It is now being used locally in afforestation projects.

The resin, known as sandarac, is used to make varnish and lacquer; it is particularly valued for preserving paintings.

The wood, known as thuya wood, citron wood, and alerce, and historically also known as thyine wood, is used for decorative woodwork, particularly wood from burls at the base of the trunk. It has been used thus since antiquity (Ancient Greek: θύον, Latin: citrus), and was used to make valuable furniture in the time of the Roman Empire. The market in Morocco is unsustainable, focusing as it does on the burl, and has resulted in mass deforestation of the species. The species is also threatened by overgrazing, which can kill the coppice regrowth before it gets tall enough to be out of the reach of livestock.

=== Cultivation ===
The species is cultivated to be grown as an ornamental tree, valued in hot, dry climates. It is also pruned in a hedge form, for privacy and security. The plant can be trained for use as bonsai specimens.

== Fossil record ==
A related extinct species, Tetraclinis salicornioides, has leaf and cone fossils of Messinian age (ca. 5.7 Ma) that have been uncovered in Monte Tondo and Borgo Tossignano, northern Apennines, Italy.

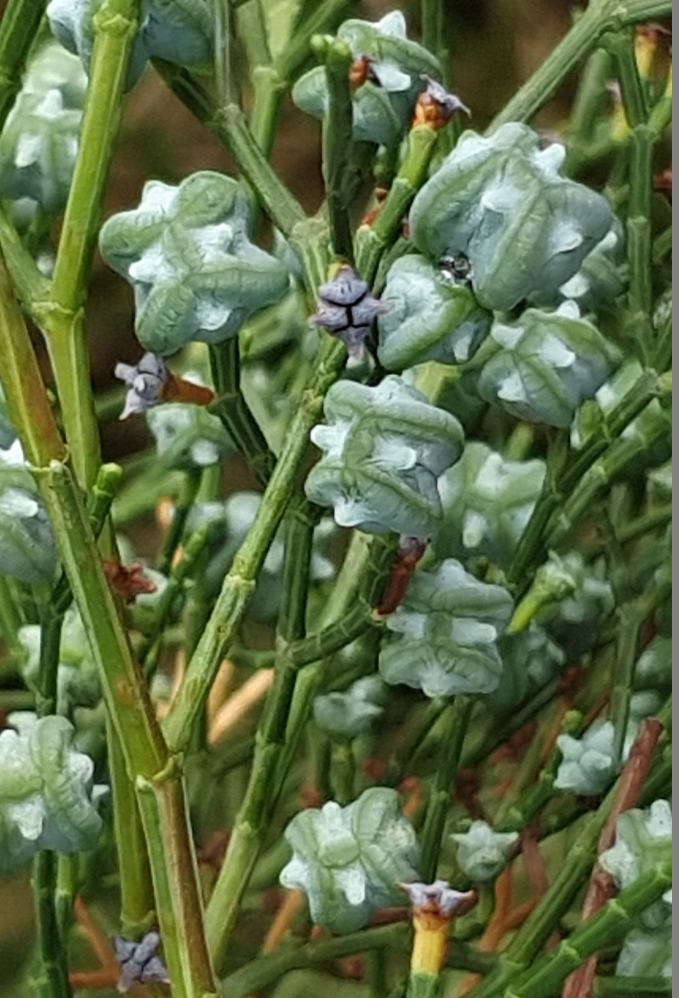

== Gallery ==
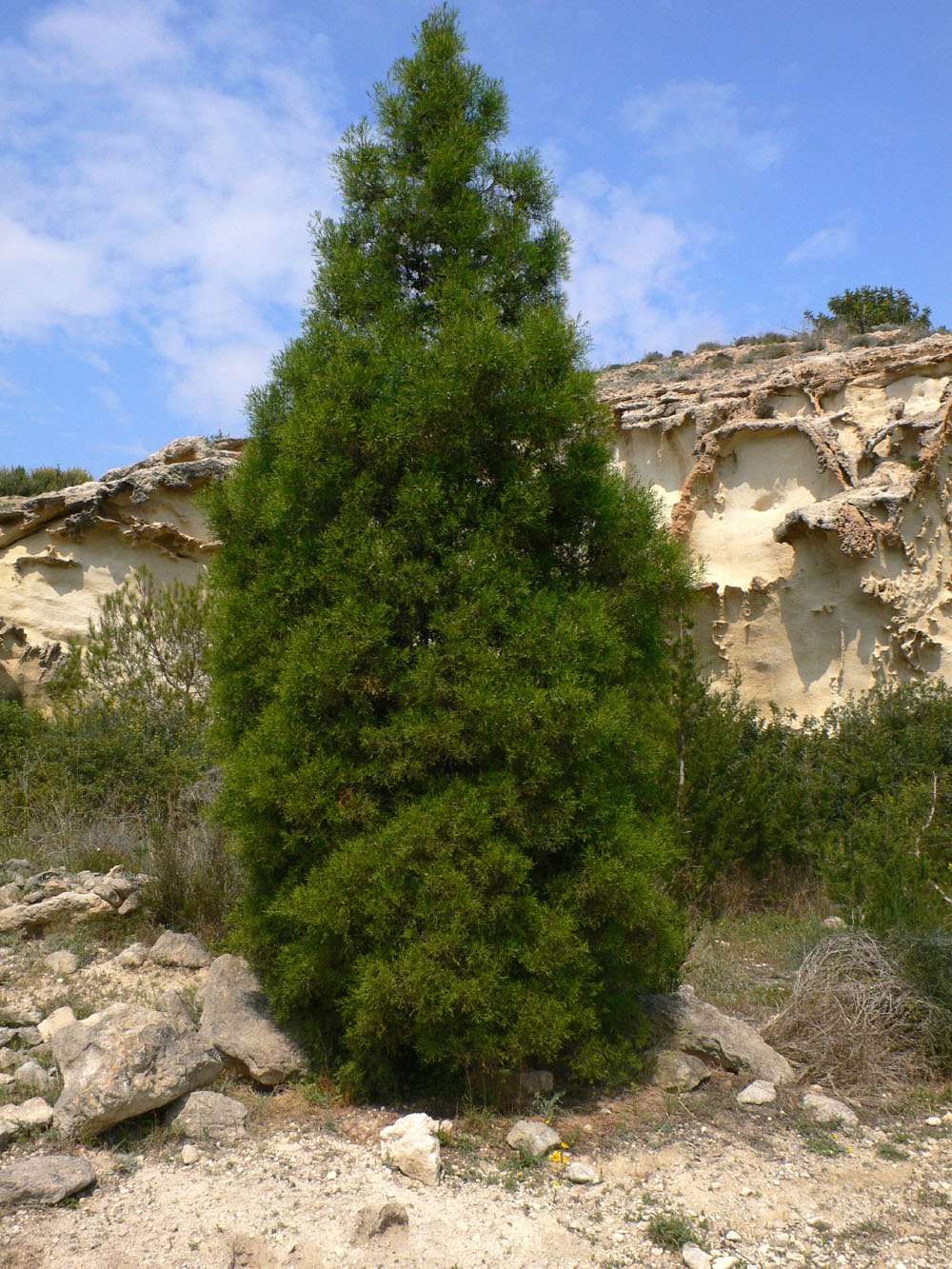
Tetraclinis articulata in the mountains of Cartagena, Spain

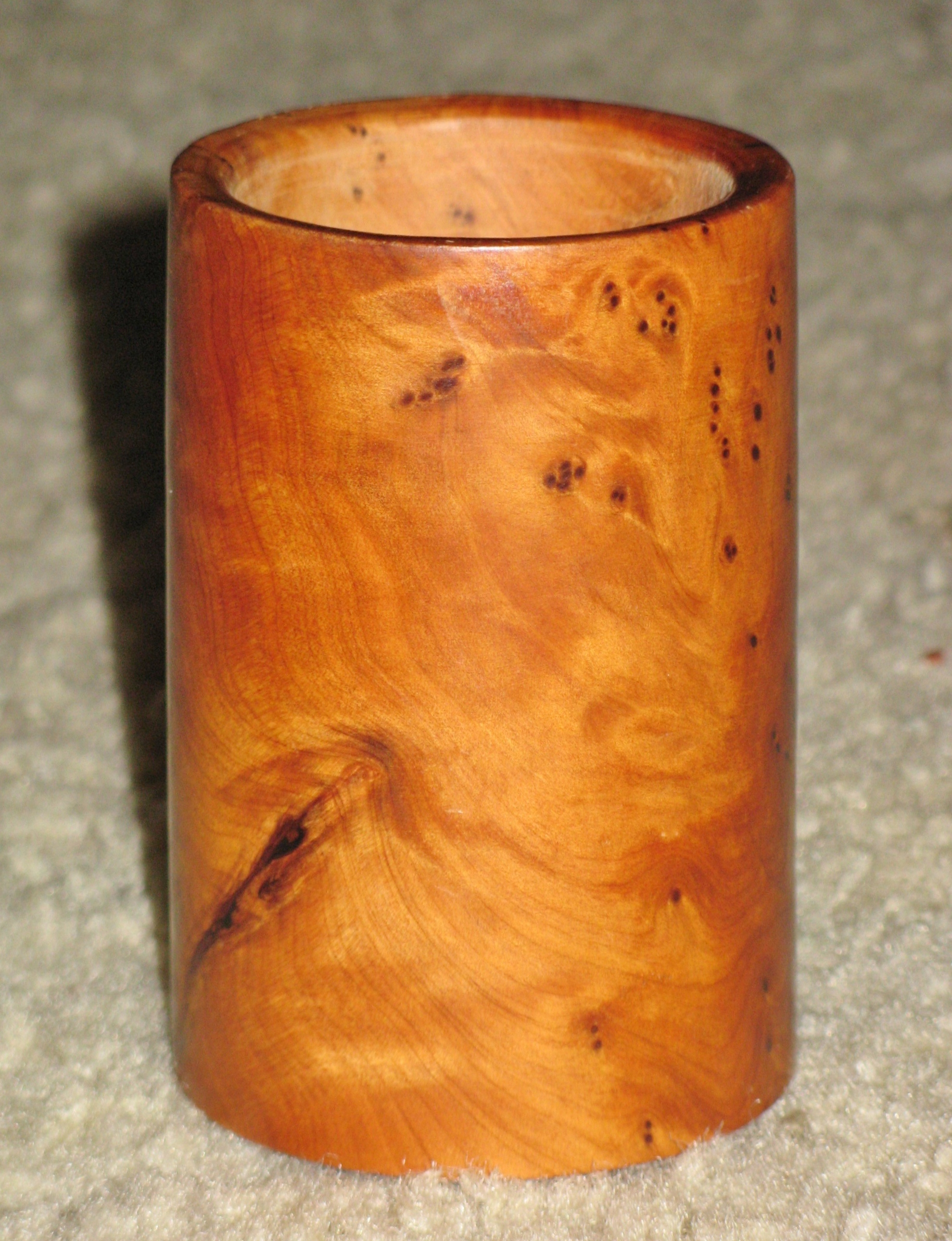
A cup made of root burl wood from the Essaouira area of Morocco

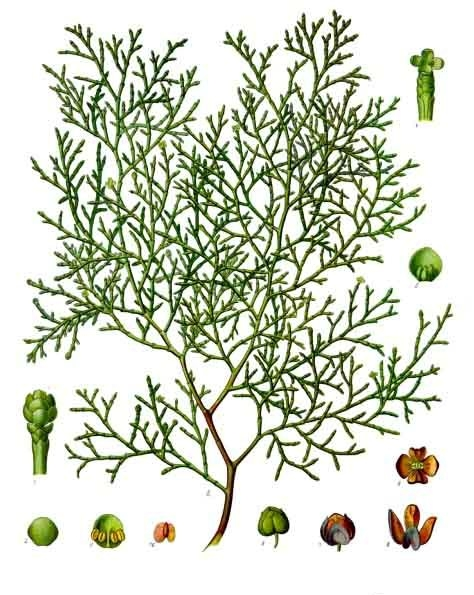
Illustration from Koehler's Medicinal-Plants (1887)

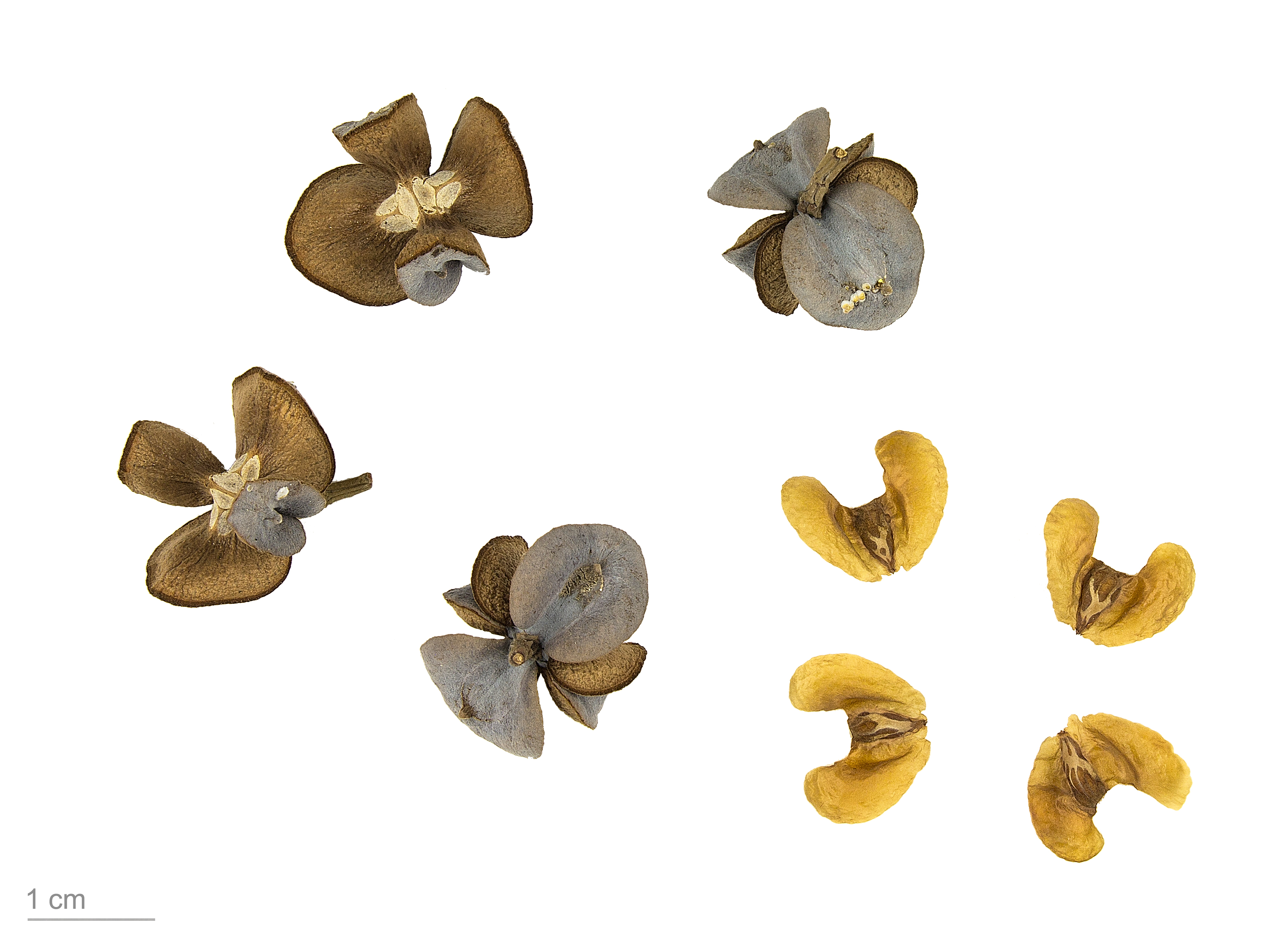
Tetraclinis articulata
