= Bni Ahmed Imoukzan =

Bni Ahmed Imoukzan Ayt Ḥmed Imugzen
- Rural commune and town
- Interactive map of Bni Ahmed Imoukzan
- Country: Morocco
- Region: Tangier-Tetouan-Al Hoceima
- Province: Al Hoceïma Province

Population (2004)
  - Total: 8,949
- Time zone: UTC+0 (GMT)

Bni Ahmed Imoukzan (Senhaja De Srair: Ayt Ḥmed Imugzen) is a small town and rural commune in Al Hoceïma Province of the Tangier-Tetouan-Al Hoceima region of Morocco. At the time of the 2004 census, the commune had a total population of 8949 people living in 1355 households.
