= Imrabten =

Coordinates: 35.0670°N 3.9670°W

Imrabten رواضي
- Rural commune and town
- Interactive map of Imrabten
- Country: Morocco
- Region: Taza-Al Hoceima-Taounate
- Province: Al Hoceïma Province

Population (2004)
  - Total: 10,098
- Time zone: UTC+0 (GMT)

Imrabten is a small town and rural commune in Al Hoceïma Province of the Taza-Al Hoceima-Taounate region of Morocco. At the time of the 2004 census, the commune had a total population of 10098 people living in 1731 households.
