= Bni Abdallah =

Bni Abdallah بني عبد الله
- Rural commune and town
- Interactive map of Bni Abdallah
- Country: Morocco
- Region: Taza-Al Hoceima-Taounate
- Province: Al Hoceïma Province

Population (2004)
  - Total: 7,566
- Time zone: UTC+0 (GMT)

Bni Abdallah is a small town and rural commune in Al Hoceïma Province of the Taza-Al Hoceima-Taounate region of Morocco. At the time of the 2004 census, the commune had a total population of 7566 people living in 1263 households.
