= Bni Ammart =

- Rural commune and town
- Interactive map of Bni Ammart
- Country: Morocco
- Region: Taza-Al Hoceima-Taounate
- Province: Al Hoceïma Province

Population (2004)
  - Total: 8,084
- Time zone: UTC+0 (GMT)

Bni Ammart is a small town and rural commune in Al Hoceïma Province of the Taza-Al Hoceima-Taounate region of Morocco. At the time of the 2004 census, the commune had a total population of 8084 people living in 1261 households.
