= Instituto Español Melchor de Jovellanos =

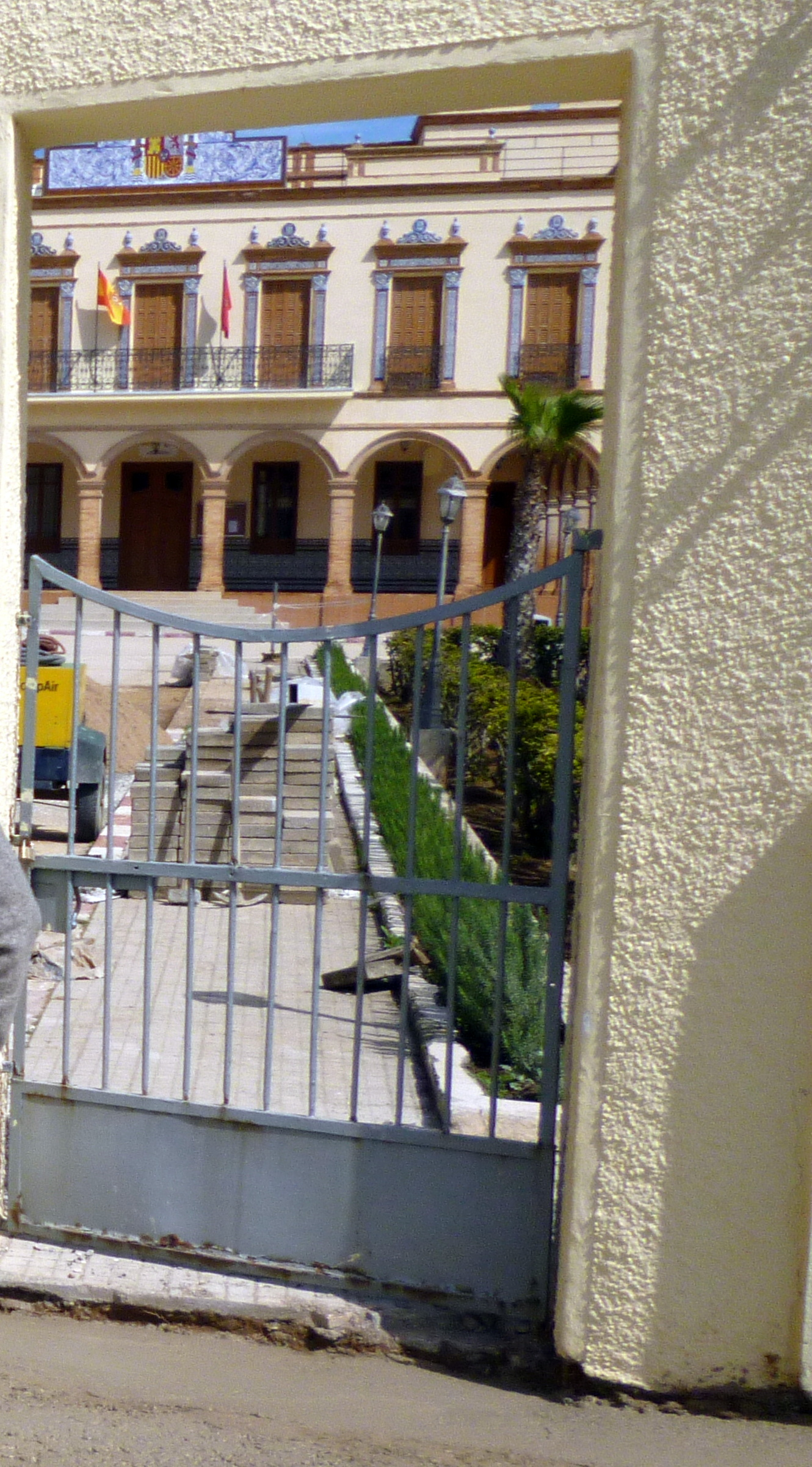

Information
- School type: International School
- Language: Spanish

Instituto Español Melchor de Jovellanos is a Spanish international school in Al Hoceima, Morocco. Operated by the Spanish Ministry of Education, it serves infant education until bachillerato (senior high school/sixth form college).

The school building was completed in 1945 after efforts to establish the school occurred in the previous decades. Increased numbers of Moroccan students seeking entry into the Spanish university system began attending after a decline in Spanish students in the 1960s and 1970s.
