= Ait Youssef Ou Ali =

Coordinates: 31°59′N 5°47′W

- Rural commune and town
- Interactive map of Ait Youssef Ou Ali
- Country: Morocco
- Region: Taza-Al Hoceima-Taounate
- Province: Al Hoceïma Province

Population (2004)
  - Total: 16,492
- Time zone: UTC+0 (GMT)

Ait Youssef Ou Ali is a small town and rural commune in Al Hoceïma Province of the Taza-Al Hoceima-Taounate region of Morocco. At the time of the 2004 census, the commune had a total population of 16,492 people living in 2981 households.
