= Chakrane =

Coordinates: 34°57′N 3°59′W

Chakrane Ceqran شقران
- Rural commune and town
- Interactive map of Chakrane
- Country: Morocco
- Region: Taza-Al Hoceima-Taounate
- Province: Al Hoceïma Province

Population (2004)
  - Total: 6,769
- Time zone: UTC+0 (GMT)

Chakrane (Tarifit: Ceqran, ⵛⴻⵇⵔⴰⵏ; Arabic: شقران) is a small town and rural commune in Al Hoceïma Province of the Taza-Al Hoceima-Taounate region of Morocco. At the time of the 2004 census, the commune had a total population of 6769 people living in 1004 households.
