= Sidi Boutmim =

Sidi Boutmim Mass-inu Butmim
- Rural commune and town
- Interactive map of Sidi Boutmim
- Country: Morocco
- Region: Tangier-Tétouan-Al Hoceima
- Province: Al Hoceïma Province

Population (2004)
  - Total: 10,242
- Time zone: UTC+0 (GMT)

Sidi Boutmim (Senhaja De Srair: Mass-inu Butmim) is a small town and rural commune in Al Hoceïma Province of the Tangier-Tetouan-Al Hoceima region of Morocco. At the time of the 2004 census, the commune had a total population of 10,242 people living in 1689 households.
