= Fahid Minhas =

Dutch politician

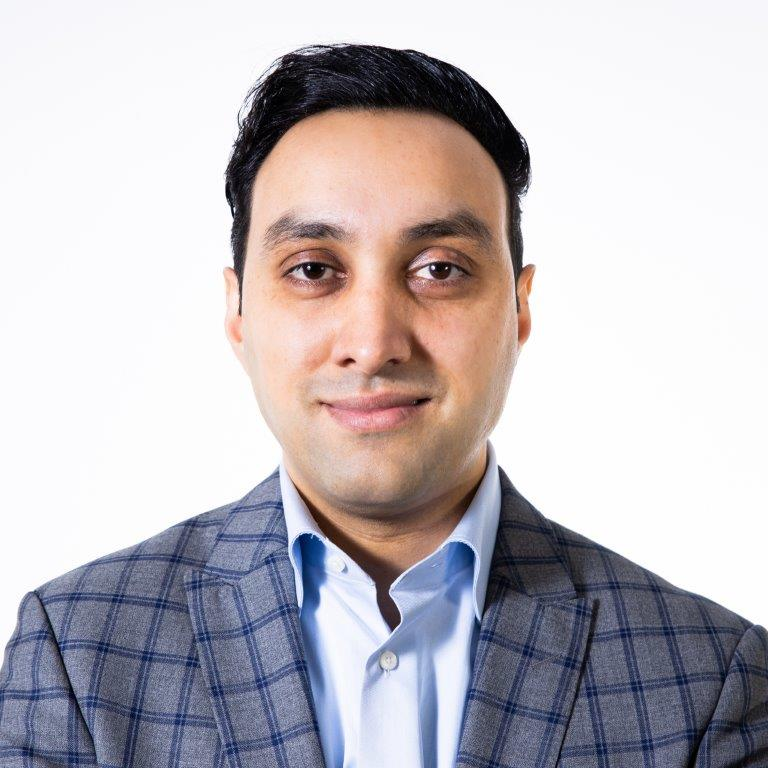

Member of the House of Representatives
- In office 31 March 2021 – 5 December 2023

Alderman in Schiedam
- In office 17 May 2018 – 31 March 2021
- Succeeded by: Antoinette Laan

Member of the Schiedam municipal council
- In office 27 March 2014 – 17 May 2018
- Succeeded by: Bertus Feelders

Personal details
- Born: Fahid Bashir Minhas; 14 February 1988 (age 38) Rotterdam, Netherlands
- Party: People's Party for Freedom and Democracy (VVD)
- Children: 2
- Education: Rotterdam University of Applied Sciences; Eindhoven University of Technology
- Occupation: Project developer
- Website: fahidminhas.nl

Fahid Bashir Minhas (born 14 February 1988) is a Dutch politician of the conservative liberal People's Party for Freedom and Democracy (VVD). He worked as a real estate developer and became a member of the Schiedam municipal council in 2014. He then served as alderman in the same city between 2018 and 2021. Minhas was elected to the House of Representatives in the 2021 general election.

== Early life and career ==
Minhas was born in 1988 in the city of Rotterdam. His parents had emigrated to the Netherlands from Pakistan, and he grew up with his two brothers and two sisters. Minhas moved from Rotterdam-West to nearby Schiedam in his childhood and lived in its eastern neighborhood. In the years 2000–2005, he attended the Rotterdam secondary school Wolfert van Borselen at havo level.

Minhas studied architectural engineering at the Rotterdam University of Applied Sciences until 2009 and subsequently did a master's in Architecture, Building and Planning at the Eindhoven University of Technology, earning his degree in 2013. He has told that he initially wanted to be an architect, but that he realized during his studies that he was bad at drawing and that he preferred arithmetic and economics. Minhas therefore decided to pursue a career in property development.

He took a job at Provast, a real estate development firm, in 2012, working on its Rotterdam Markthal project. Minhas became a project developer for the company in 2014 and kept working there until his appointment as alderman in 2018.

== Schiedam politics (2014–2021) ==
After having assisted the VVD's caucus in the Schiedam municipal council for some time, he became the party's third candidate in the 2014 municipal elections. He had also helped write the VVD's election program. He was elected and was sworn into the Schiedam municipal council on 27 March. His focus was on housing, construction, and spatial planning.

Minhas was re-elected in 2018 as the second person on the VVD's party list. His party won a plurality, and Minhas – aged thirty – left the council to become an alderman in the new municipal executive. He simultaneously became Schiedam's deputy mayor, and he received the portfolio housing, construction, maritime development, business parks, and sports. At the time, he owned five houses in Schiedam that he rented out. Due to his new position, Minhas decided to outsource the management of his properties.

As an alderman, he encouraged the construction of new housing developments in his municipality. He also promoted skyscrapers to be built in the new Schieveste neighborhood, located between the railway station Schiedam Centrum and the A20 motorway, which is planned to include one 120 m (390 ft) tall apartment building and several more with heights between 40 m (130 ft) and 90 m (300 ft). The project with 3,000 houses received €18 million in funding from the national government. Minhas was chosen Best Political Leader Under 40 of 2019 by the readers of magazine Binnenlands Bestuur because of his ambitious housing projects and his ability to listen.

Minhas helped form a governing coalition in Schiedam following municipal elections on 16 March 2022. Fellow VVD member Nathalie Gouweleeuw had initially been selected for this purpose, but the municipal council had dismissed her advice. Minhas was subsequently picked as scout by DENK in late April and recommended a coalition consisting of the VVD, DENK, the Labour Party, D66, and Progressief Schiedam almost two weeks later. The council agreed with this conclusion.

== House of Representatives ==
He ran for member of parliament (MP) in the 2021 general election, being placed 26th on the VVD's party list. His party won 34 seats, causing Minhas to be elected. He had received 699 preference votes and was sworn into the House of Representatives on 31 March. He left his position as alderman, being succeeded by former MP Antoinette Laan, and also sold his three remaining rental properties in Schiedam. In the House, Minhas's specialties are spatial planning, public transport, water management, the Kadaster, the Environment and Planning Act, the Crisis and Recovery Act, and the Spatial Planning Act. He is a member of the Committees for Agriculture, Nature and Food Quality; for Infrastructure and Water Management (vice chair); for the Interior; and for Public Expenditure.

Together with Jaco Geurts (CDA), he called on the state secretary to investigate a possible train connection between Eindhoven and Aachen. He also co-filed successful amendments in late 2022 to spend €112.5 million of the infrastructure budget on projects in the northern Netherlands – one to tackle rail issues in Meppel and another to build a navigable aqueduct in Leeuwarden. In 2023, a motion by Minhas and Faissal Boulakjar (D66) was passed compelling the cabinet to investigate prohibiting the splitting of agricultural land into smaller plots. Het Financieele Dagblad had reported that these lands were being bought to be divided into plots that could potentially be used for residential construction and sold to investors with a significant profit. However, the newspaper noted that construction of housing had been rare on those plots. In August 2023, a judge determined that these investments should be within the purview of the Netherlands Authority for the Financial Markets.

When the collapse of the fourth Rutte cabinet triggered a snap election in November 2023, Minhas decided to not seek a second term. He stated he could be of more use to society elsewhere, without yet mentioning what he would do afterwards. He later became president of Neprom, an industry association for project and urban developers.

== Electoral history ==
Electoral history of Fahid Minhas
| Year | Body | Party | Pos. | Votes | Result | | Ref. |
| Year | Body | Party | Pos. | Votes | Party seats | Individual | Ref. |
|---|---|---|---|---|---|---|---|
| 2021 | House of Representatives | People's Party for Freedom and Democracy | 26 | 699 | 34 | Won | |

== Personal life ==
Minhas lives in Schiedam. He has a wife and two children, the first of whom was born in 2020.
