= Bni Bouchibet =

Bni Bouchibet Ayt Bucibet
- Rural commune and town
- Interactive map of Bni Bouchibet
- Country: Morocco
- Region: Tangier-Tetouan-Al Hoceima
- Province: Al Hoceïma Province

Population (2004)
  - Total: 8,102
- Time zone: UTC+0 (GMT)

Bni Bouchibet (Senhaja De Srair: Ayt Bucibet) is a small town and rural commune in Al Hoceïma Province of the Tangier-Tetouan-Al Hoceima region of Morocco. At the time of the 2004 census, the commune had a total population of 8102 people living in 1285 households.
