= Bni Gmil Maksouline =

- Rural commune and town
- Interactive map of Bni Gmil Maksouline
- Coordinates: 35°00′12″N 4°27′34″W
- Country: Morocco
- Region: Tangier-Tetouan-Al Hoceima
- Province: Al Hoceïma Province

Population (2014)
  - Total: 9,922
- Time zone: UTC+0 (GMT)

Bni Gmil Maksouline is a small town and rural commune in Al Hoceïma Province of the Tangier-Tetouan-Al Hoceima region of Morocco. At the time of the 2014 census, the commune had a total population of 9922 people living in 1324 households.
