= Bni Bounsar =

Bni Bounsar Ayt Bunṣer
- Rural commune and town
- Interactive map of Bni Bounsar
- Country: Morocco
- Region: Tangier-Tetouan-Al Hoceima
- Province: Al Hoceïma Province

Population (2004)
  - Total: 8,112
- Time zone: UTC+0 (GMT)

Bni Bounsar (Senhaja De Srair: Ayt Bunṣer) is a small town and rural commune in Al Hoceïma Province of the Tangier-Tetouan-Al Hoceima region of Morocco. At the time of the 2004 census, the commune had a total population of 8112 people living in 1123 households.
