= Louta, Morocco =

Coordinates: 34°50′N 4°26′W

Louta
- Rural commune and town
- Interactive map of Louta
- Country: Morocco
- Region: Taza-Al Hoceima-Taounate
- Province: Al Hoceïma Province

Population (2004)
  - Total: 6,325
- Time zone: UTC+0 (GMT)

Louta is a small town and rural commune in Al Hoceïma Province of the Taza-Al Hoceima-Taounate region of Morocco. At the time of the 2004 census, the commune had a total population of 6,325 people living in 1,035 households.
