= Al Hoceima Province =

Province of Morocco

Coordinates: 35°15′N 3°56′W

Al Hoceima Province إقليم الحسيمة ⵜⴰⵙⴳⴰ ⵏ ⵍⵃⵓⵙⵉⵎⴰ
- Province
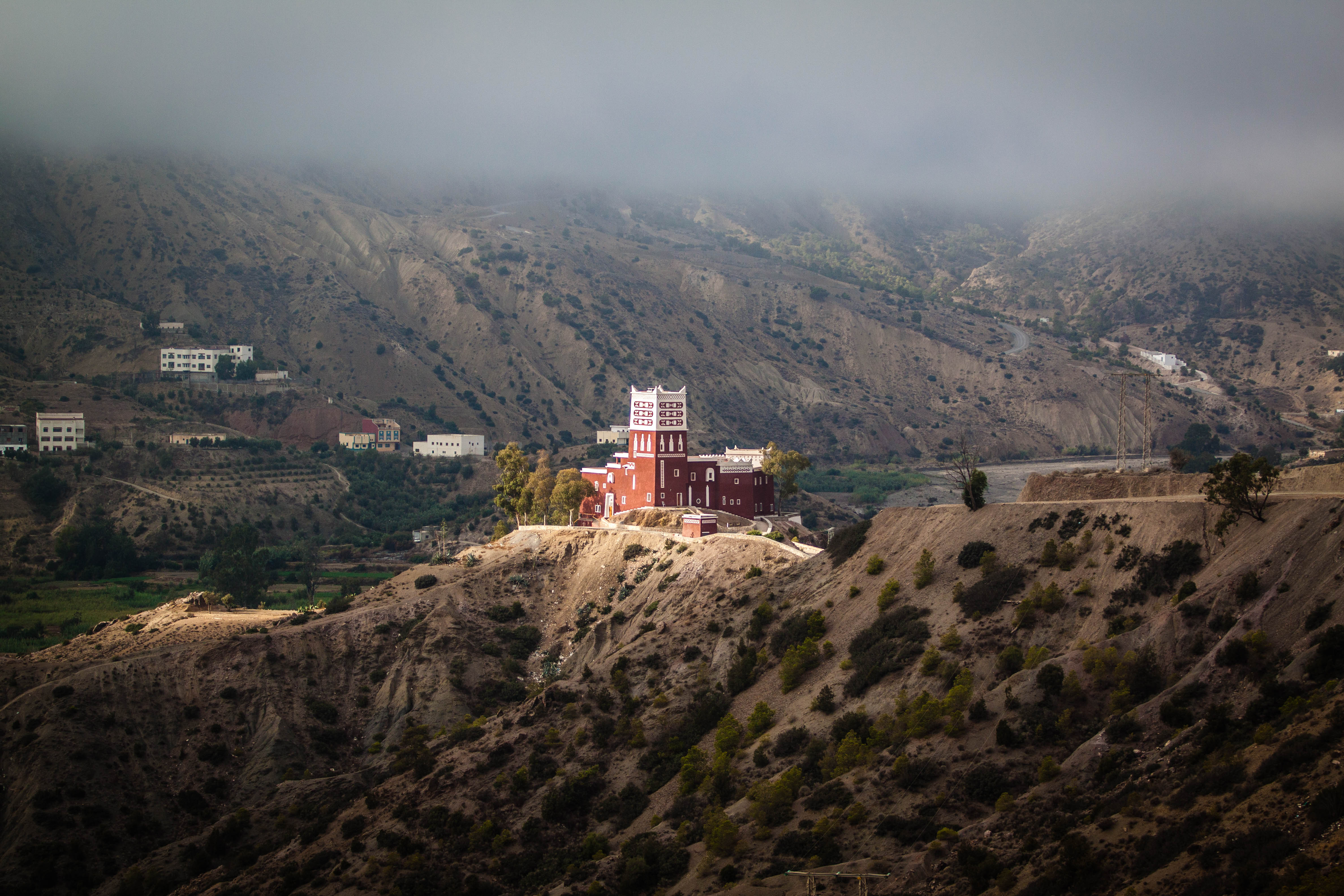
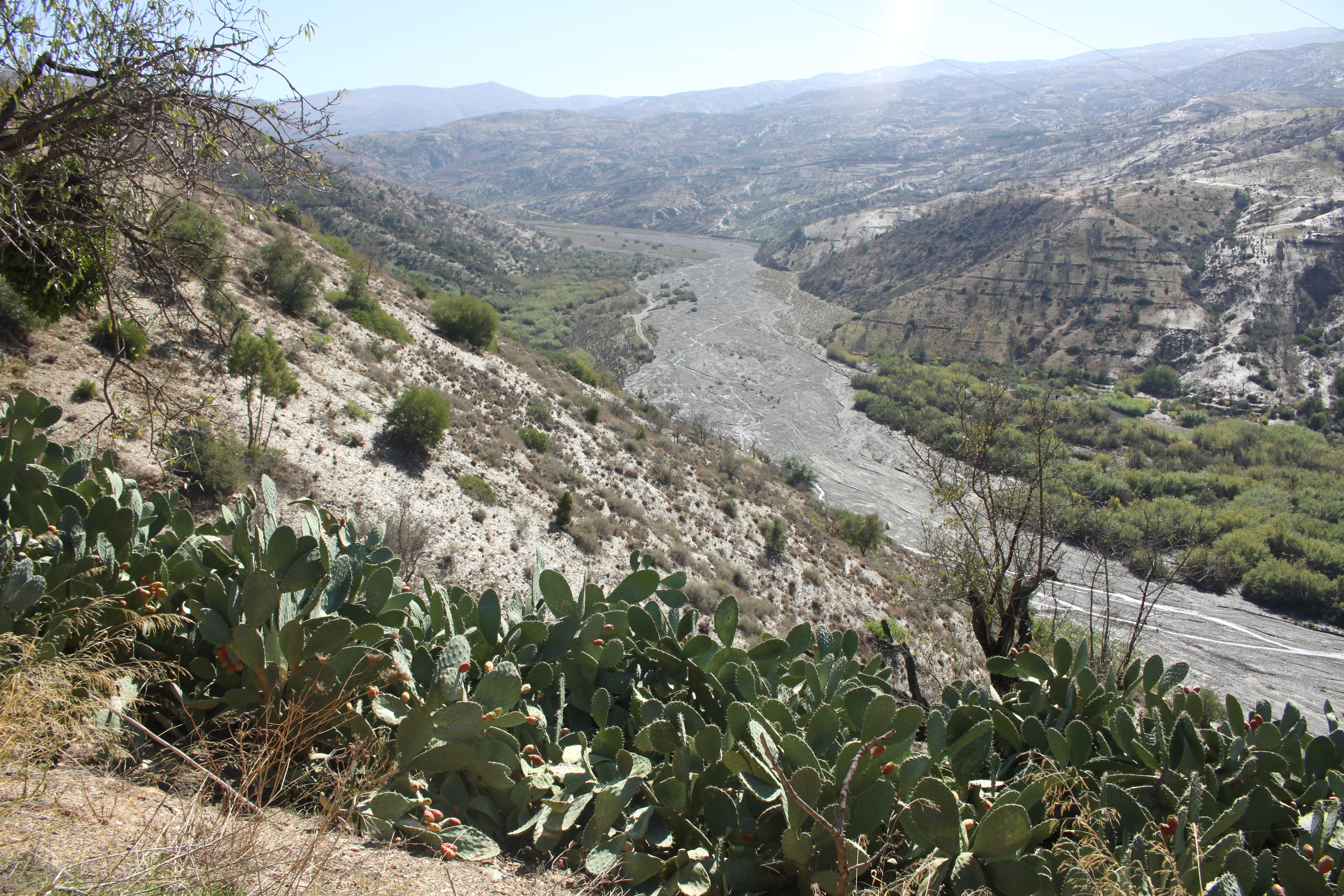

- Flag
- Country: Morocco
- Region: Tanger-Tetouan-Al Hoceima
- Seat: Al Hoceima

Area
  - Total: 3,550 km^{2} (1,370 sq mi)

Population (2024)
  - Total: 371,527

Al Hoceima Province (Berber: ⵜⴰⵙⴳⴰ ⵏ ⵍⵃⵓⵙⵉⵎⴰ) is a predominantly rural province in the Tanger-Tetouan-Al Hoceima region of northern Morocco. It takes its name from its capital, Al Hoceima, one of the main cities of the Rif region.

The province of Al Hoceima is characterized by notable linguistic diversity, as it is home to three main linguistic varieties: Tarifit, Senhaja Berber, and Darija.

== History ==
Al Hoceima Province was established in 1959 by Dahir No. 1-59-351 of 2 December 1959 concerning the administrative division of the kingdom, modifying and supplementing the Dahir of 13 October 1956. Covering an area of approximately 3,550 km², it occupies the central and one of the highest parts of the Rif mountain range, reaching 2,452 m at Jebel Tidirhine.

The province is bounded by the Mediterranean Sea to the north, Taza Province and Taounate Province to the south, Driouch Province to the east, and Chefchaouen Province to the west.

== Geography ==
=== Location ===
Al Hoceima Province is located in the eastern part of the Tanger-Tetouan-Al Hoceima region. It covers an area of approximately 3,350 km².

It is bordered by:

- the Mediterranean Sea to the north;
- Nador Province to the east;
- Taza Province and Taounate Province to the south;
- Chefchaouen Province to the west.

The province is characterized by mountainous terrain and a Mediterranean coastline, with a combination of rugged relief and coastal plains.

=== Urban centres ===
Nine localities are classified as cities in census terms: the municipalities of Al Hoceima, Bni Bouayach, Imzouren, Targuist, and Ajdir, as well as the urban centers of the rural communes of Aït Youssef Ou Ali, Bni Hadifa, Imrabten, and Issaguen.

== Administrative divisions ==
Communes of Al Hoceima Province

According to the administrative division established in 2008 and amended in 2010 and 2013, the province is composed of 36 communes, including 5 urban municipalities: Al Hoceima (the capital), Bni Bouayach, Imzouren, Targuist, and Ajdir.

The remaining 31 rural communes are grouped into 17 caïdats within four circles:

- Bni Boufrah Circle:
  - caïdat of Bni Boufrah: Bni Boufrah and Senada;
  - caïdat of Bni Gmil Mesttassa: Bni Gmil Maksouline and Bni Gmil;
- Bni Ouriaghel Circle:
  - caïdat of Arbaa Taourirt: Arbaa Taourirt and Chakrane;
  - caïdat of Nekkour: Nekkour and Tifarouine;
  - caïdat of Bni Hadifa: Bni Hadifa and Zaouïat Sidi Abdelkader;
  - caïdat of Beni Abdallah: Beni Abdallah;
  - caïdat of Aït Youssef Ou Ali: Aït Youssef Ou Ali and Louta;
  - caïdat of Imrabten: Imrabten;
  - caïdat of Izzemouren: Izzemouren and Aït Kamra;
  - caïdat of Rouadi: Rouadi;
- Targuist Circle:
  - caïdat of Bni Ammart: Bni Ammart and Sidi Bouzineb;
  - caïdat of Sidi Boutmim: Sidi Boutmim, Zarqet, and Bni Bchir;
  - caïdat of Bni Bounsar: Bni Bounsar and Bni Ahmed Imougzen;
- Ketama Circle:
  - caïdat of Ketama: Ketama and Tamsaout;
  - caïdat of Issaguen: Issaguen and Moulay Ahmed Cherif;
  - caïdat of Tabarrant: Bni Bouchibet and Taghzout;
  - caïdat of Ikaouen: Abdelghaya Souahel.

== Demography ==
The province is divided administratively into the following:

Name	Geographic code	Type	Population (2024)	Notes
Al Hoceima	01.051.01.01	Municipality	50,225	
Bni Bouayach	01.051.01.03	Municipality	20,013	
Imzouren	01.051.01.05	Municipality	34,848	
Targuist	01.051.01.07	Municipality	14,638	
Ajdir	01.051.01.09	Municipality	5,630	
Bni Boufrah	01.051.03.01	Rural commune	8,401	
Bni Gmil	01.051.03.03	Rural commune	7,752	
Bni Gmil Maksouline	01.051.03.05	Rural commune	7,214	
Senada	01.051.03.07	Rural commune	8,059	
Ait Youssef Ou Ali	01.051.05.03	Rural commune	13,830	3,884 residents live in the center, called Sidi Bouafif; 9,946 residents live in rural areas.
Louta	01.051.05.05	Rural commune	4,408	
Arbaa Taourirt	01.051.05.07	Rural commune	3,799	
Chakrane	01.051.05.09	Rural commune	3,306	
Imrabten	01.051.05.11	Rural commune	6,983	1,796 residents live in the center, called Tamassint; 5,187 residents live in rural areas.
Nekkour	01.051.05.13	Rural commune	7,721	
Tifarouine	01.051.05.15	Rural commune	3,318	
Bni Hadifa	01.051.05.17	Rural commune	4,723	
Zaouiat Sidi Abdelkader	01.051.05.19	Rural commune	4,150	
Izemmouren	01.051.05.21	Rural commune	6,365	
Ait Kamra	01.051.05.23	Rural commune	8,269	
Bni Abdallah	01.051.05.25	Rural commune	4,939	
Rouadi	01.051.05.27	Rural commune	6,858	
Bni Ammart	01.051.07.03	Rural commune	5,583	
Sidi Bouzineb	01.051.07.05	Rural commune	2,756	
Bni Bounsar	01.051.07.07	Rural commune	6,498	
Bni Ahmed Imoukzan	01.051.07.09	Rural commune	7,580	
Sidi Boutmim	01.051.07.11	Rural commune	8,462	
Zerkat	01.051.07.13	Rural commune	5,601	
Bni Bchir	01.051.07.15	Rural commune	5,401	
Abdelghaya Souahel	01.051.09.01	Rural commune	24,435	
Bni Bouchibet	01.051.09.03	Rural commune	8,909	
Issaguen	01.051.09.05	Rural commune	17,834	2,420 residents live in the center, called Issaguen; 15,414 residents live in rural areas.
Moulay Ahmed Cherif	01.051.09.07	Rural commune	9,357	
Ketama	01.051.09.09	Rural commune	16,690	
Tamsaout	01.051.09.11	Rural commune	12,856	
Taghzout	01.051.09.13	Rural commune	4,116	
