= Rouadi =

- Rural commune and town
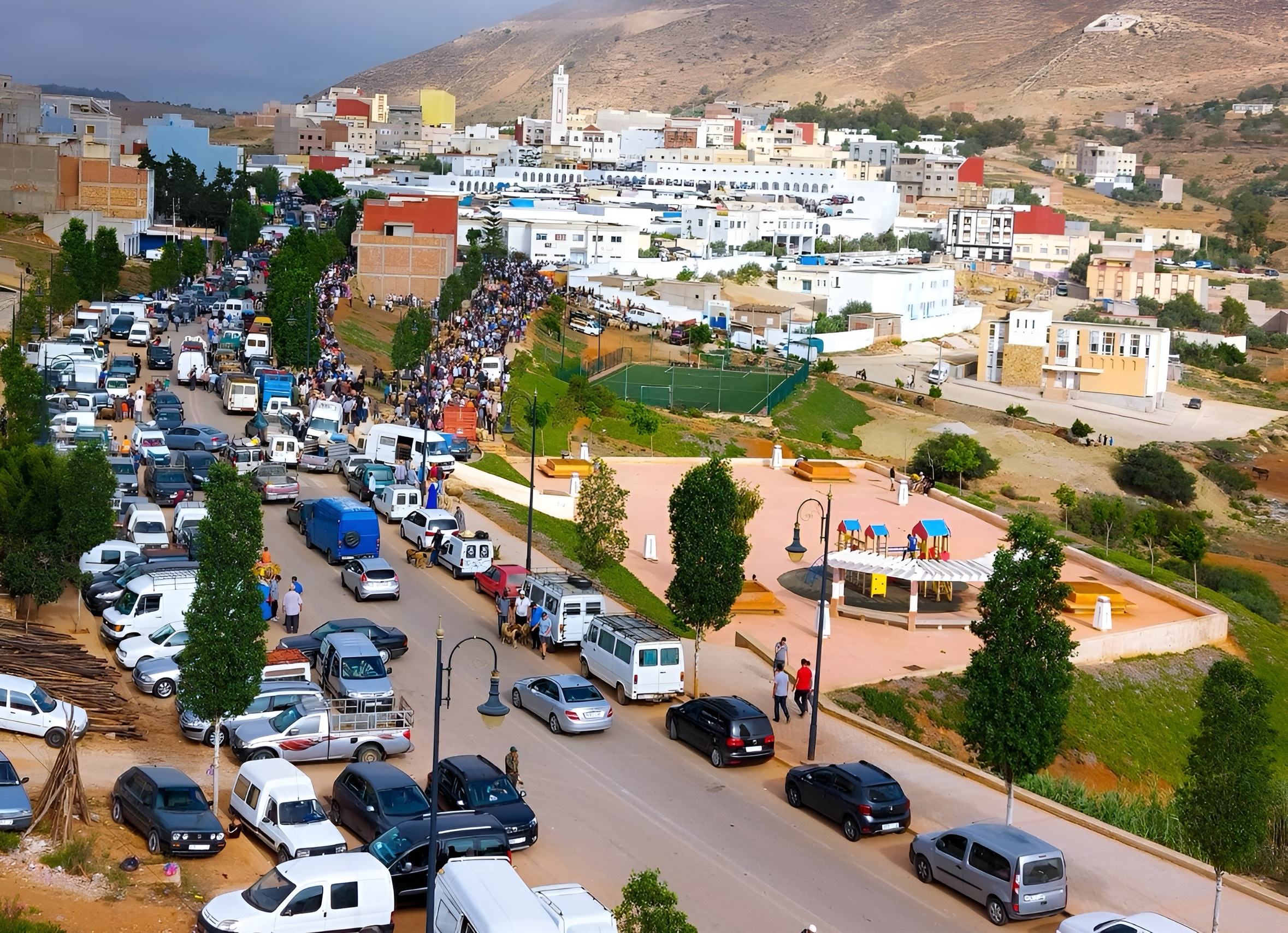
- Interactive map of Rouadi
- Country: Morocco
- Region: Tanger-Tetouan-Al Hoceima
- Province: Al Hoceïma Province

Population (2004)
  - Total: 8,092
- Time zone: UTC+0 (GMT)

Rouadi is a small town and rural commune in Al Hoceïma Province of the Tanger-Tetouan-Al Hoceima region of Morocco. At the time of the 2004 census, the commune had a total population of 8092 people living in 1467 households.
