= Izemmouren =

Coordinates: 35°11′N 4°00′W

- Rural commune and town
- Interactive map of Izemmouren
- Country: Morocco
- Region: Taza-Al Hoceima-Taounate
- Province: Al Hoceïma Province

Population (2004)
  - Total: 4,437
- Time zone: UTC+0 (GMT)

Izemmouren is a small town and rural commune in Al Hoceïma Province of the Taza-Al Hoceima-Taounate region of Morocco. At the time of the 2004 census, the commune had a total population of 4437 people living in 864 households.
