= Al Hoceima =

City in Northern Morocco

Al Hoceima ⵍⵃⵓⵙⵉⵎⴰ (Standard Moroccan Tamazight) الحسيمة (Arabic)
- City
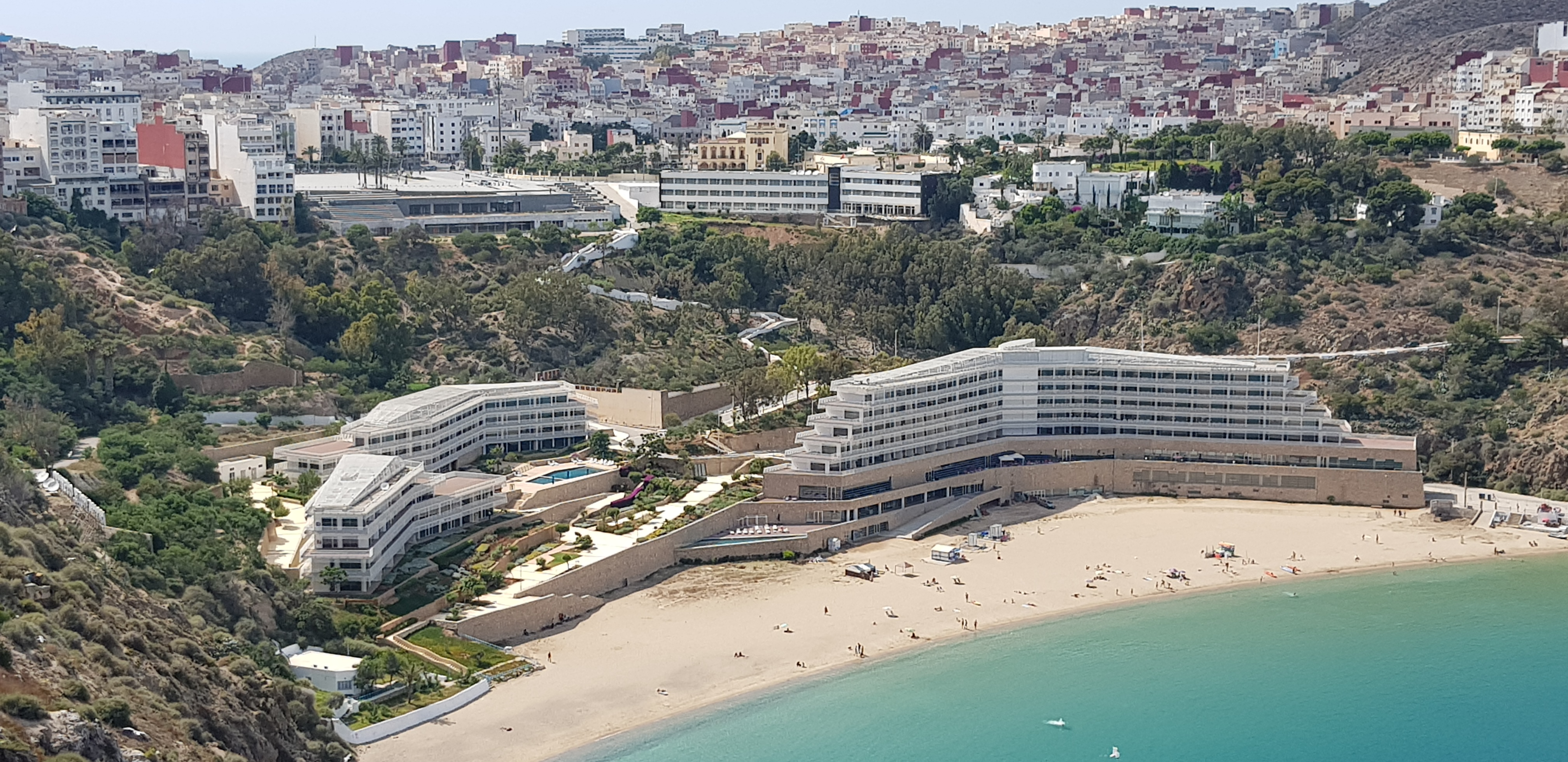
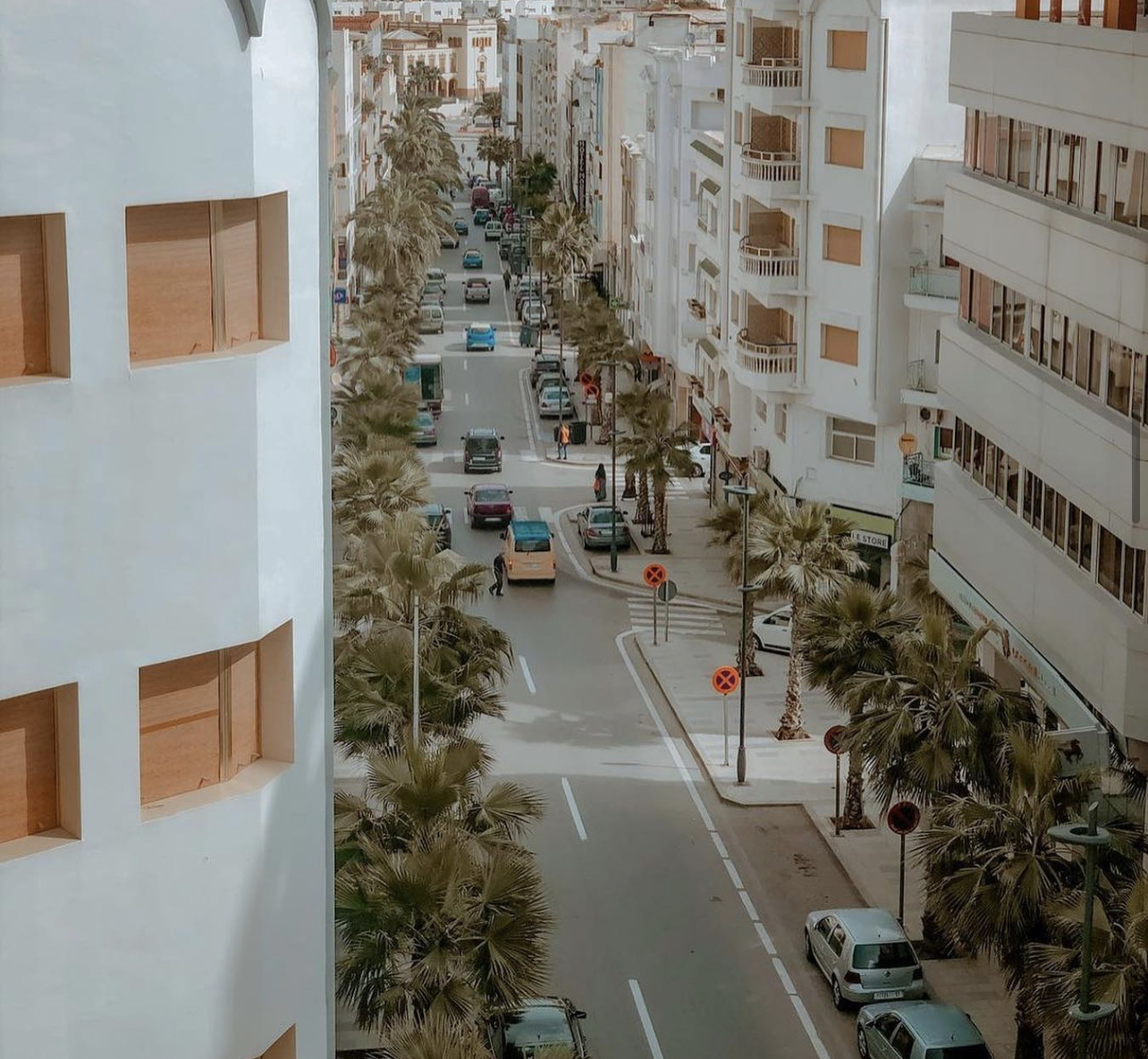
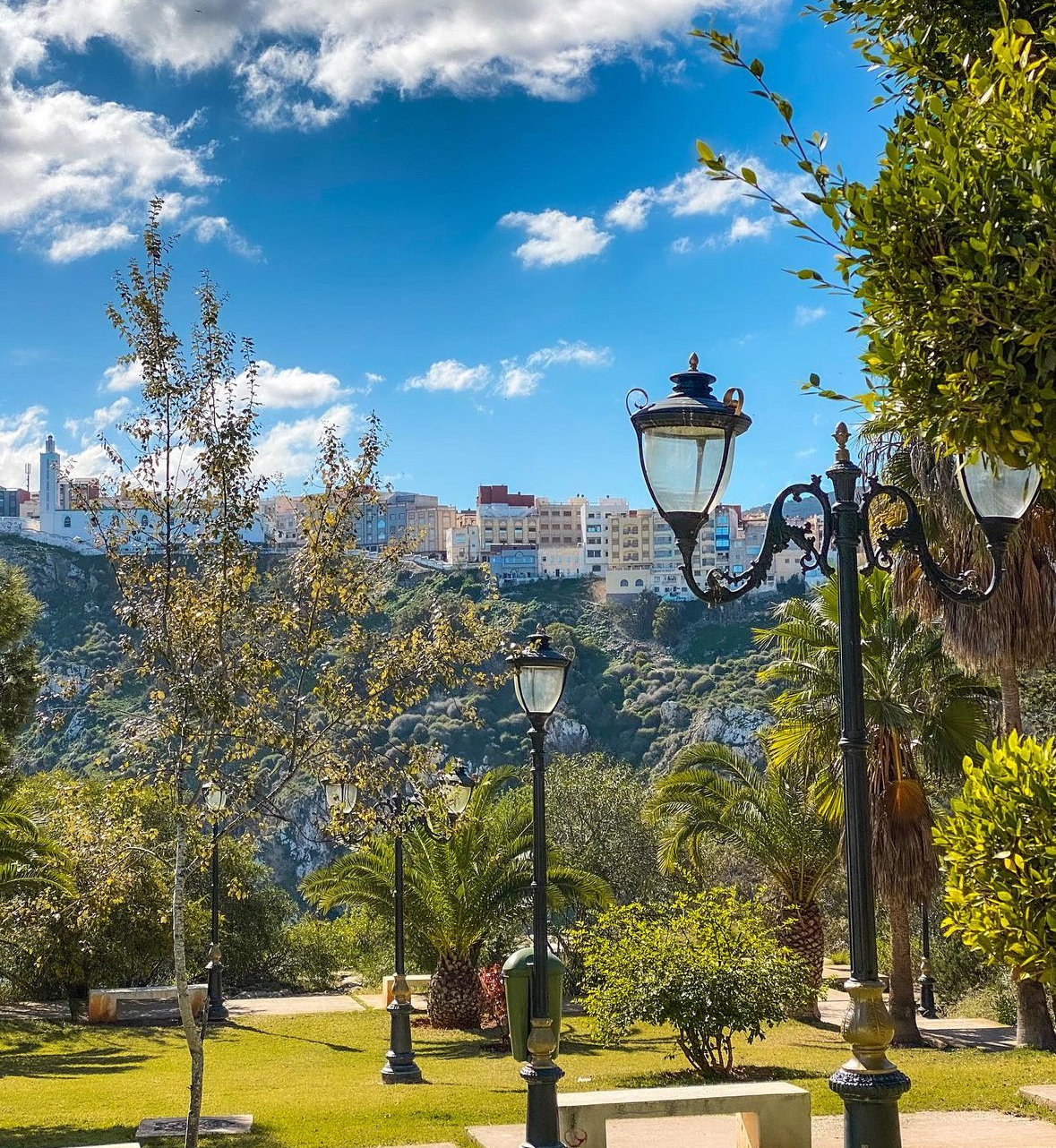
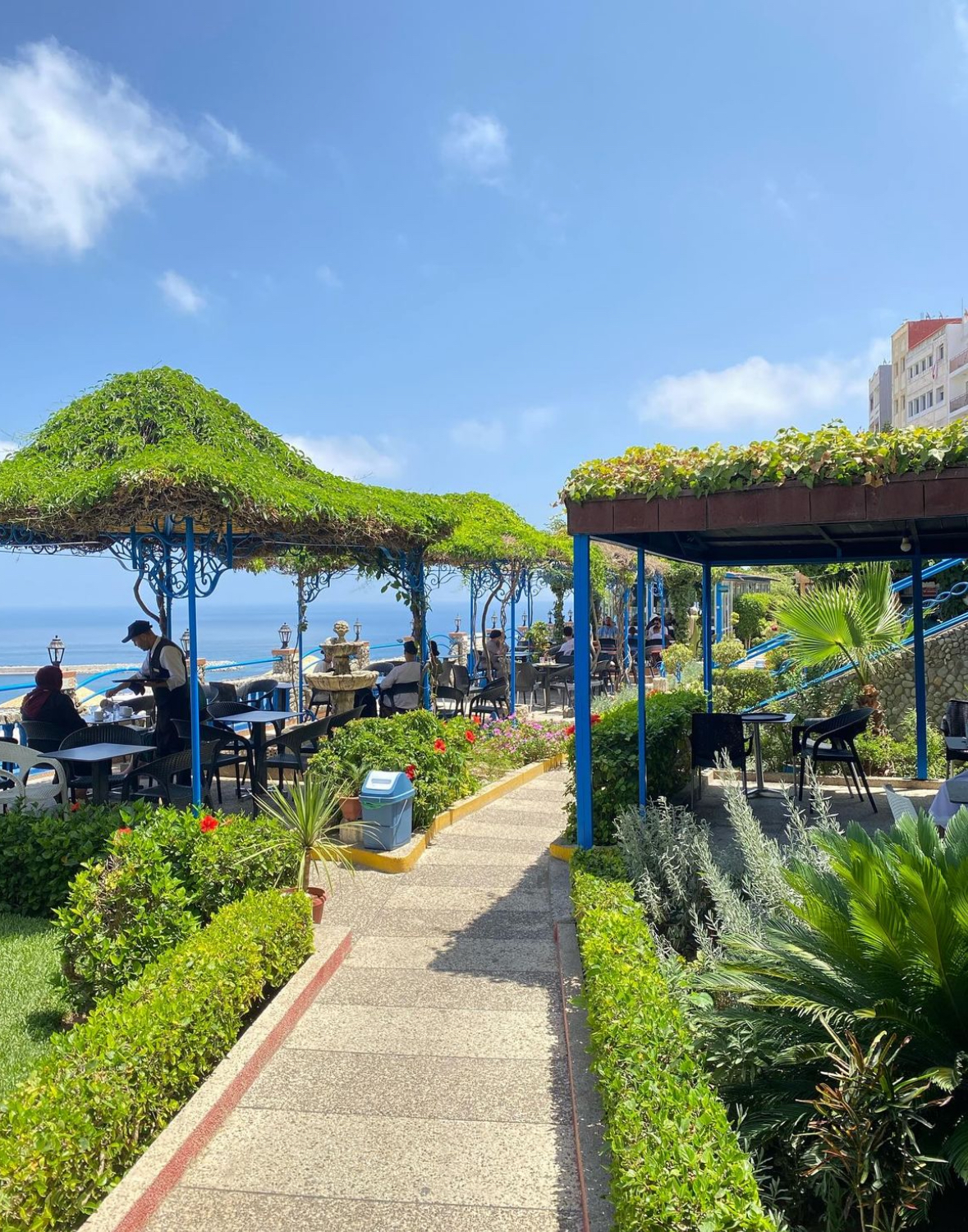
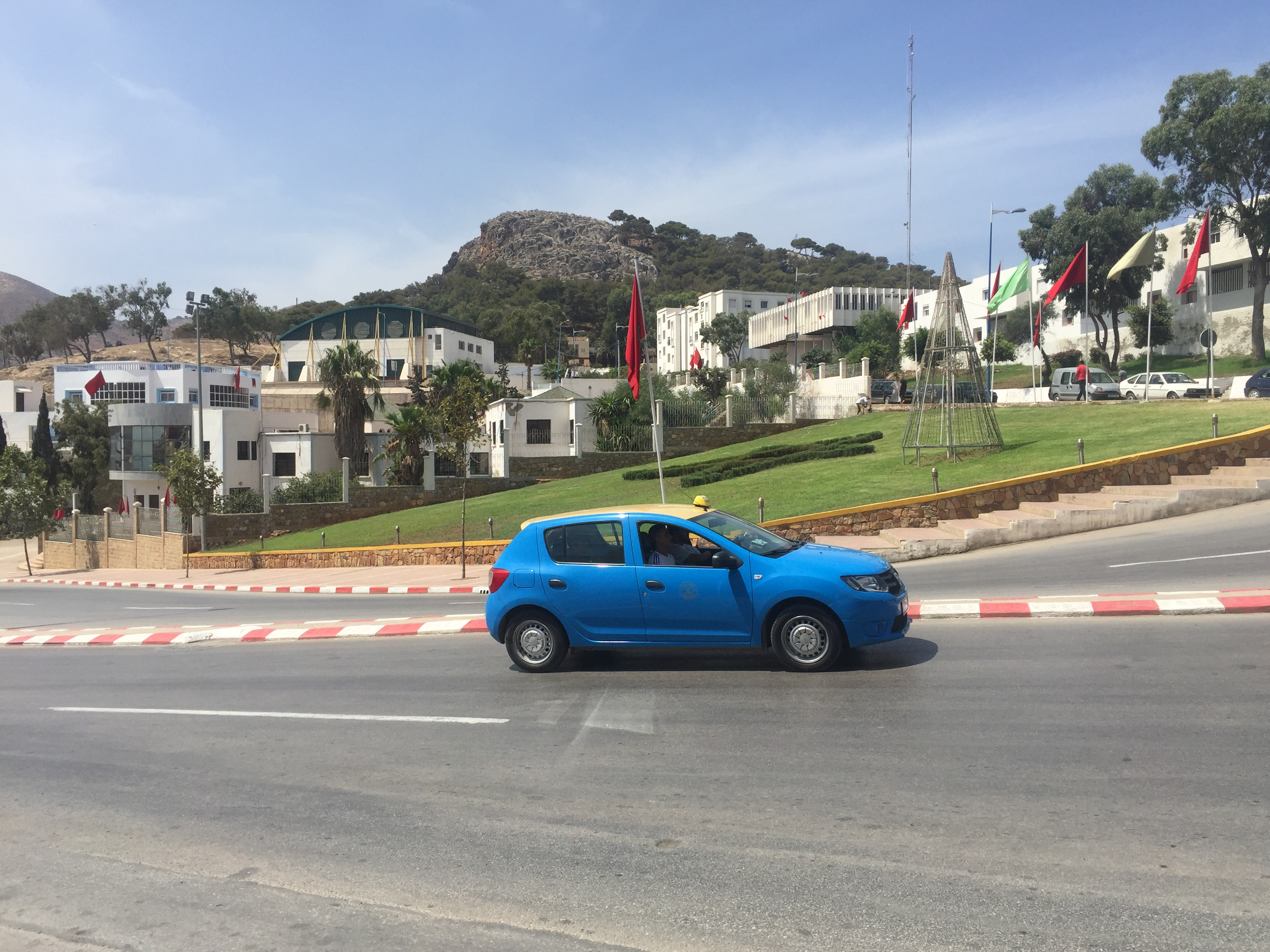
- Interactive map of Al Hoceima
- Coordinates: 35°14′50″N 3°55′56″W
- Country: Morocco
- Region: Tanger-Tetouan-Al Hoceima
- Province: Al Hoceima
- Founded: 1925
- Renamed Al Hoceima: 1955

Government
  - Type: Mayor–council government
  - Mayor: Najib Ouazzani (MP)

Population (2024)
  - Total: 50,225
- Time zone: UTC+0 (GMT)
- Postal code: 32000

Al Hoceima (Note: Standard Moroccan Tamazight: ⵍⵃⵓⵙⵉⵎⴰ, romanized: Lḥusima} Arabic: الحسيمة, romanized: al-Ḥusayma)) is a city in the north of Morocco, on the northern edge of the Rif Mountains and on the Mediterranean coast. It is the capital city of the Al Hoceima Province. Located in the heart of the Central Rif, Al Hoceima is surrounded by the highest peaks of the Rif mountain range, including Mount Tidghin (2,452 m). The city served as a focal point for the Republic of the Rif (1921–1926) and remains a cultural center for the Ayt Waryaghar tribe. The city is a known tourist destination despite its small size. It has a population of about 50,225 (2024 census).

Al Hoceima is distinguished by its pristine sandy beaches with turquoise water such as Cala Iris, Peñón de Vélez de la Gomera, Quemado, and Tala Youssef, as well as its mountainous terrain.

== Name ==
Al Hoceima takes its name from the nearby Spanish-owned Alhucemas Islands (Spanish: Islas Alhucemas, "lavender islands"), and is an Arabised form of that name, itself from the Andalusi Arabic al-Khuzāmā. After independence, the Moroccan government established an Arabised name for Alhucemas coming up with Al Hoceima, following the standard French spelling. Some like the author of the Spanish encyclopedia Espasa-Calpe say Alhucemas is a corruption of al-Mazimma.

== History ==
=== Early and colonial history ===
The Ait Ouriaghel Berber tribe (also 'Beni Urriaguel') dominated the area around Al Hoceima. Abd el-Krim, whose father was a qadi of the Ait Youssef ou Ali clan, organized a guerilla force against the Spanish during the Rif War, establishing the Republic of the Rif in 1921. In September 1925, Spanish General José Sanjurjo landed at Al Hoceima and claimed the territory for Spain. The Spanish developed the town and named it Villa Sanjurjo after General Sanjurjo. The first mayor was Florian Gómez Aroca.

=== Since Moroccan independence ===
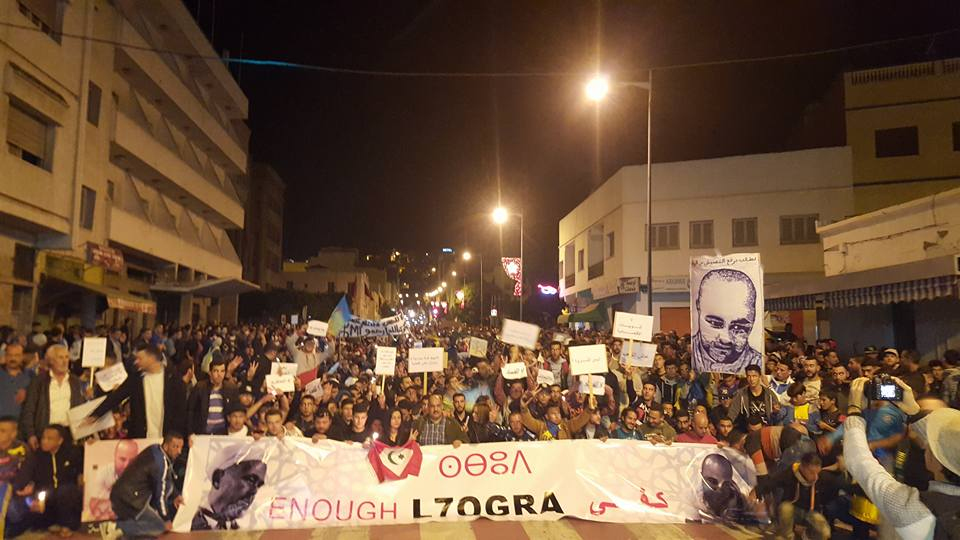
demonstration at Al Hoceima, 2017.

After Morocco gained its independence in 1956, Al Hoceima developed quickly, and the Moroccan government changed its name from the Spanish Villa Alhucemas to Al Hoceima.

The years from 1956 to 1959 were marked by challenges for the Rif region. Morocco's Hassan II, then crown prince, assumed the role of military commander, and during this period, a significant number of people lost their lives in the Rif. In October 1958, the Beni Urriaguel community rebelled against the central administration, prompting the deployment of two-thirds of Morocco's army, led by Hassan, to Al Hoceima.

In the early 1950s and 1960s, during a period of economic hardship when many of the city's inhabitants were of modest means, the small houses in the city were predominantly painted white and blue. These colors, symbolizing the sea and sky, were commonly regarded as the city's official colors. As economic conditions improved over time, residents began to paint their houses in a wider range of colors.

The city and surrounding villages were hit by two large earthquakes within ten years. The first (M_{w} 6.0 event occurred on 26 May 1994, and the second event (M_{w} 6.4) occurred on 24 February 2004, killing more than 560 people (see 2004 Al Hoceima earthquake). In 2007, Al Hoceima's mayor stated that all new houses would be painted white and blue in an effort to restore the city's traditional appearance.

Al Hoceima is now a moderate-size city with a population of 56,716 recorded in the 2014 Moroccan census. It has the second-largest port of the Rif region (Nador being the largest). The first schools built by the Spanish colonials, (a college and an elementary school) and a Spanish catholic church, still exist today.

Playa Quemado, where General Sanjurjo and his troops landed in 1925, is one of Al Hoceima's well-known beaches. Situated beneath the Mohammed V hotel, the beach is frequented by visitors. The hotel offers amenities such as a tennis court, restaurant, cocktail bar, and nightclub.

Al Hoceima has been the centre of repression by and political protest against the Moroccan government in the 21st century. Five young protesters were murdered, and their burned bodies found in Al Hoceima, in 2011. On 28 October 2016, a fish-seller, Mouhcine Fikri, was crushed to death in a rubbish truck while trying to retrieve fish confiscated by the authorities, which led to large anti-government protests in November 2016 known as Hirak Rif. Protests in Al Hoceima continued after the start of Ramadan, 26 May, and culminated on 26 June with "bloody clashes", then spreading to other parts of northern Morocco and the country. On 7 January 2023, A 5.3 Magnitude Earthquake hit Al Hoceima Province, Nekkour. On 12 February 2023, National Institute of Geophysics announced two earthquakes that occurred in the Al Hoceima region, in the north of the country, measuring 3.8 and 4.3 degrees.

== Climate ==
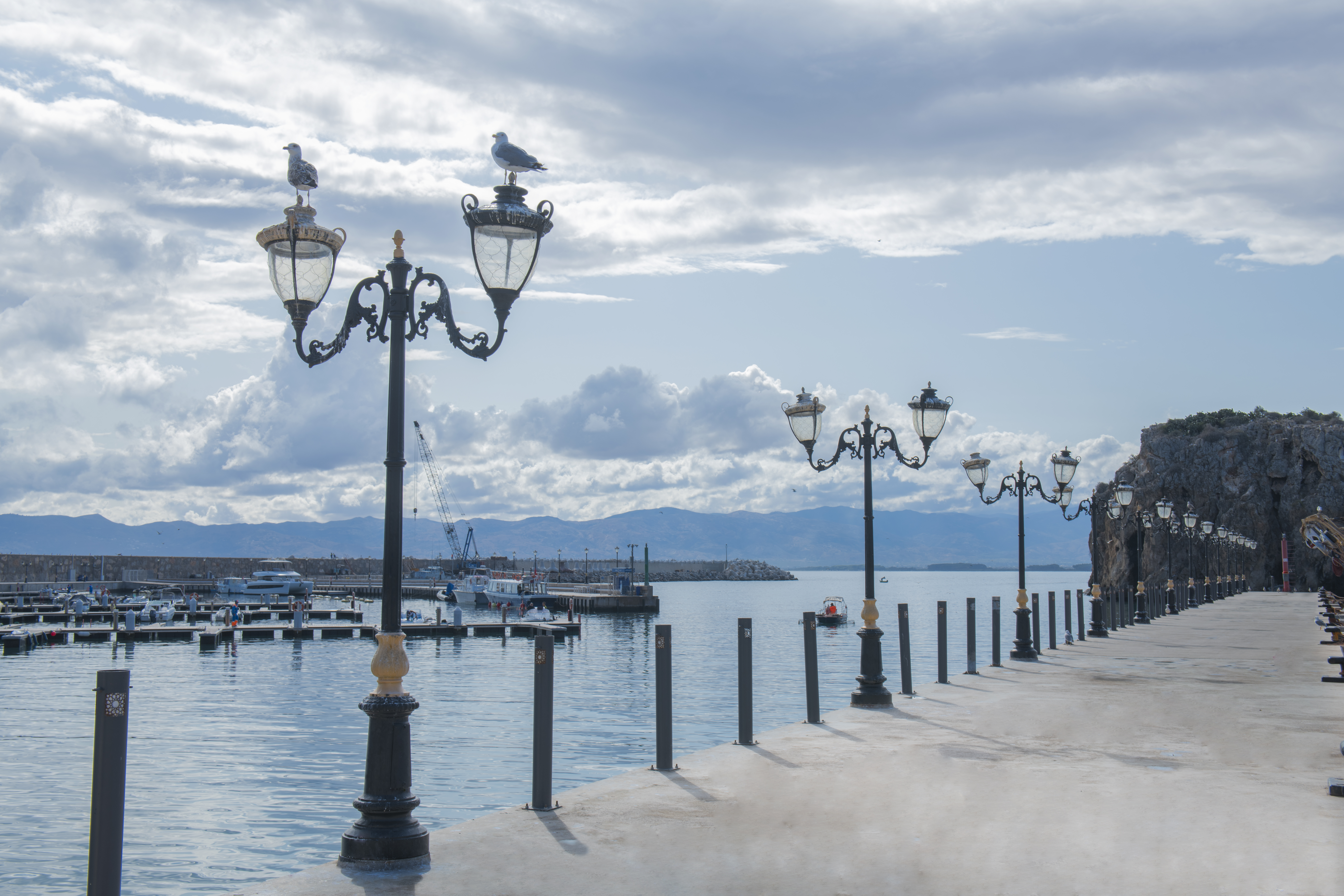
the corniche

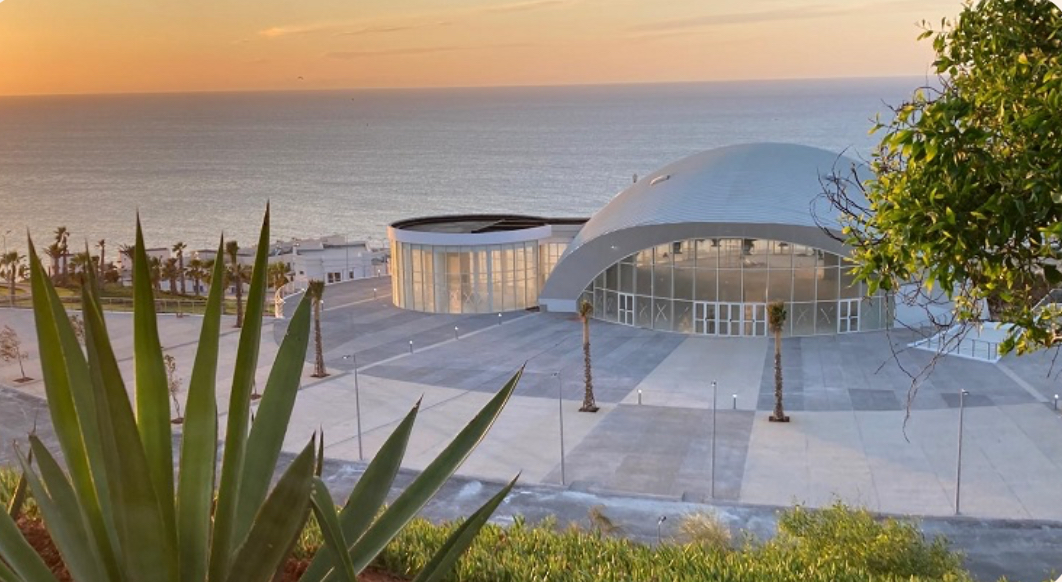
Aquatic center

The climate in Al Hoceima is generally warm and temperate. According to the Köppen-Geiger classification, the city has a Hot-summer Mediterranean climate. The average annual temperature is 17.7 °C, while average rainfall is around 414 mm per year. Summer begins at the end of June and ends in September. The most popular times to visit are July, August and September. The driest month is July with an average of 1 mm of precipitation, While the rainiest month is November with an average of 62 mm.

With an average of 24.4 °C, August is the warmest month. January has the lowest average temperature of the year with a comfortable 12.3 °C.

October exhibits the highest relative humidity, with an average of 78.90%. On the other hand, in July, the average level of relative humidity is slightly reduced at 68.76%.

In June the highest average of daily hours of sunshine is measured, with 12.14 hours of sunshine a day and a total of 376.26 hours of sunshine throughout June. In January the lowest average of daily hours of sunshine is measured, with only 7.72 hours of sunshine per day and a monthly total of 239.33 hours of sunshine. Around 3569.6 hours of sunlight are counted throughout the year. On average, there are 297.47 hours of sunlight per month.

The average annual water temperature (Alboran Sea) is 18.40 °C, with some variation depending on season : In August, the highest average water temperature is reached at 23.10 °C. Whereas in February the lowest average water temperature is measured at 14.90 °C.

Climate data for Al Hoceima (Cherif Al Idrissi Airport) (1991–2020 normals, extremes 1965–present)
Month	Jan	Feb	Mar	Apr	May	Jun	Jul	Aug	Sep	Oct	Nov	Dec	Year
Record high °C (°F)	27.6 (81.7)	30.0 (86.0)	30.8 (87.4)	32.6 (90.7)	34.2 (93.6)	39.6 (103.3)	41.0 (105.8)	38.6 (101.5)	41.0 (105.8)	34.6 (94.3)	35.0 (95.0)	31.0 (87.8)	41.0 (105.8)
Mean daily maximum °C (°F)	17.4 (63.3)	17.7 (63.9)	19.1 (66.4)	20.5 (68.9)	22.9 (73.2)	25.7 (78.3)	28.3 (82.9)	28.9 (84.0)	26.5 (79.7)	23.7 (74.7)	20.5 (68.9)	18.4 (65.1)	22.5 (72.5)
Daily mean °C (°F)	12.7 (54.9)	13.2 (55.8)	14.7 (58.5)	16.2 (61.2)	18.7 (65.7)	21.7 (71.1)	24.4 (75.9)	24.9 (76.8)	22.6 (72.7)	19.6 (67.3)	16.0 (60.8)	13.7 (56.7)	18.2 (64.8)
Mean daily minimum °C (°F)	7.9 (46.2)	8.6 (47.5)	10.2 (50.4)	11.8 (53.2)	14.6 (58.3)	17.7 (63.9)	20.1 (68.2)	20.9 (69.6)	18.6 (65.5)	15.5 (59.9)	11.5 (52.7)	9.0 (48.2)	13.9 (57.0)
Record low °C (°F)	−1.0 (30.2)	0.0 (32.0)	0.0 (32.0)	0.5 (32.9)	6.0 (42.8)	9.0 (48.2)	11.3 (52.3)	11.2 (52.2)	10.0 (50.0)	6.0 (42.8)	3.5 (38.3)	0.0 (32.0)	−1.0 (30.2)
Average precipitation mm (inches)	45.7 (1.80)	43.6 (1.72)	37.0 (1.46)	33.3 (1.31)	21.1 (0.83)	9.4 (0.37)	1.7 (0.07)	5.2 (0.20)	14.6 (0.57)	43.7 (1.72)	45.8 (1.80)	34.3 (1.35)	335.4 (13.20)
Average precipitation days (≥ 1.0 mm)	5.0	4.9	4.8	4.4	3.2	0.9	0.4	0.8	2.3	3.9	4.6	4.7	39.9
Mean monthly sunshine hours	201.5	187.6	235.6	243.0	285.2	309.0	331.7	310.0	255.0	232.5	192.0	198.4	2,991.5
Percentage possible sunshine	65.0	60.9	63.3	62.3	65.7	70.1	74.3	74.6	68.5	66.4	61.5	64.0	66.0
Source 1: NOAA (sun 1981–2010); daily sunshine hours from Weather-2-Visit
Source 2: Meteo Climat (records)

== Economy ==
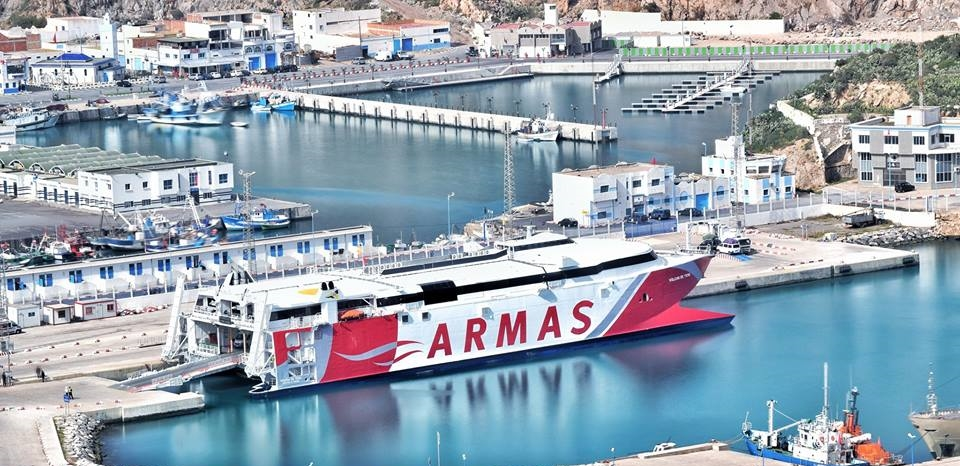
the port of Al hoceima

The city's income is based on fishing and tourism. Many of its former inhabitants migrated to Europe during the 1960s through 1980s; large numbers of Moroccans in the Netherlands, France and Belgium were Al Hoceima natives, many of whom return to Al Hoceima during the summer, when the town is also frequented by tourists from Germany and France.

The town beach is Plage Quemado, which is also where fishers bring in their catch. A quieter beach is in nearby Asfiha. The Torres de Alcala and Kalah Iris beaches are also considered Al Hoceima beaches, though they are 60 km from town.

== Transport ==
The city is served by the Cherif Al Idrissi Airport.

== Education ==
There is a Spanish international school, Instituto Español Melchor de Jovellanos.

Abdelmalek Essaâdi University - Campus of Al Hoceima contains:

- Faculty of Science and Technology - FSTH
- Superior School of Technology - ESTH
- Faculty of Legal and Political Sciences
- National School of Applied Sciences - ENSA'H
- Multidisciplinary Faculty - FPH (Under Construction)
- National School of Commerce and Management - ENCG

== Notable people ==
- Nasser Zefzafi, Moroccan political activist
- Jamal Ben Saddik, Moroccan kickboxer
- Tarik Elyounoussi, Norwegian footballer of Moroccan origin
- Mohamed Elyounoussi, Norwegian footballer of Moroccan origin
- Ibrahim Afellay, Dutch former footballer of Moroccan origin
- Khalid Boulahrouz, Dutch former footballer of Moroccan origin
- Isam Bachiri, Danish Singer of Moroccan origin
- Mohamed Oulhaj, Moroccan footballer
- Ilyas El Omari, Moroccan politician
- Youssaf El Marnissi, Moroccan racing driver

== Twin towns – sister cities ==
- Sint-Niklaas, Belgium
- Albuñol, Spain

== See also ==
- Rif
- Spanish protectorate in Morocco
