= Senada =

Coordinates: 35°04′N 4°13′W

Senada سنادة
- Rural commune and town
- Interactive map of Senada
- Country: Morocco
- Region: Tangier-Tétouan-Al Hoceima
- Province: Al Hoceïma Province

Population (2024)
  - Total: 8,059
- Time zone: UTC+0 (GMT)

Senada is a small town and rural commune in Al Hoceïma Province of the Tangier-Tétouan-Al Hoceima region of Morocco. At the time of the 2024 census, the commune had a total population of 8059 people.
