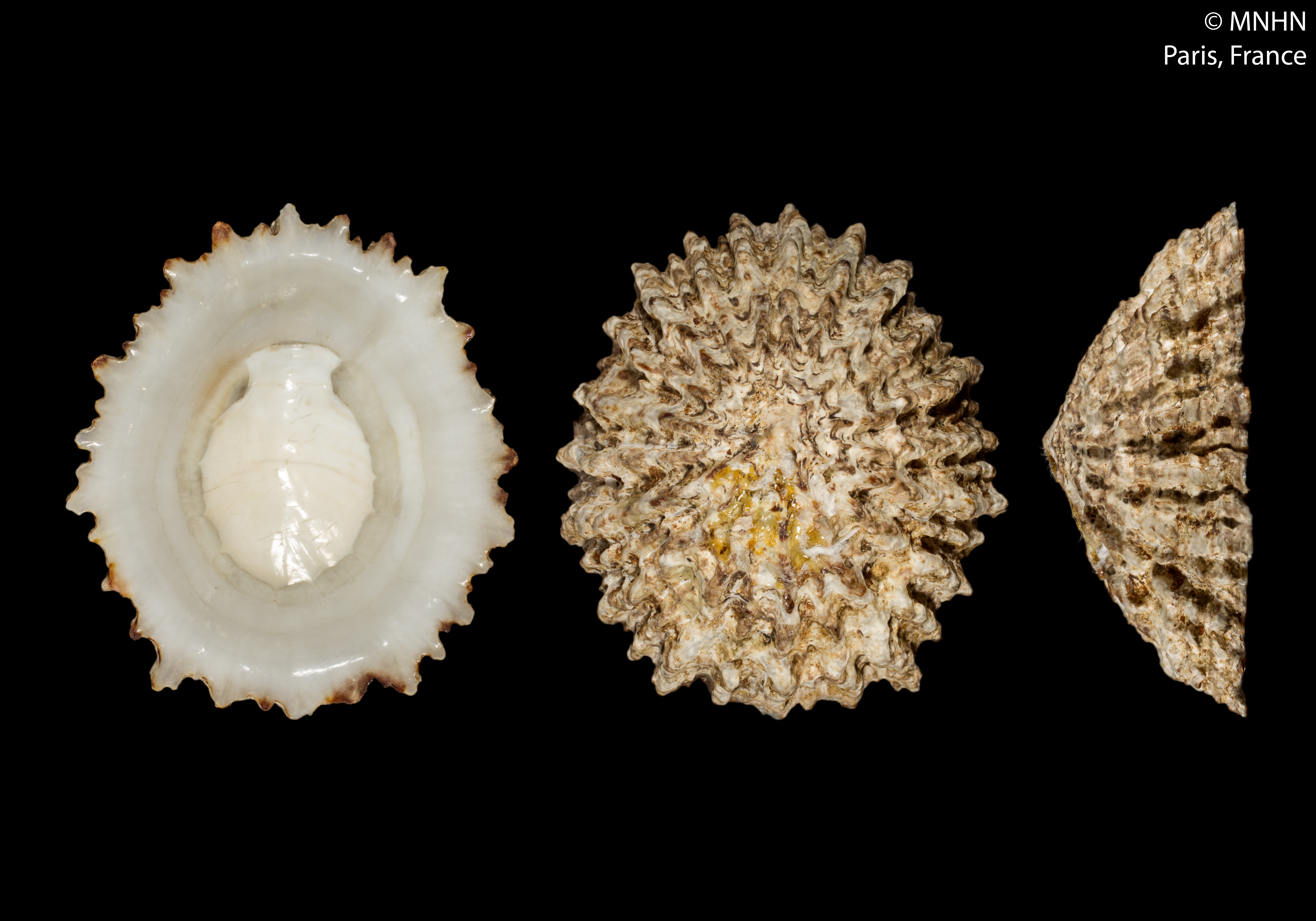

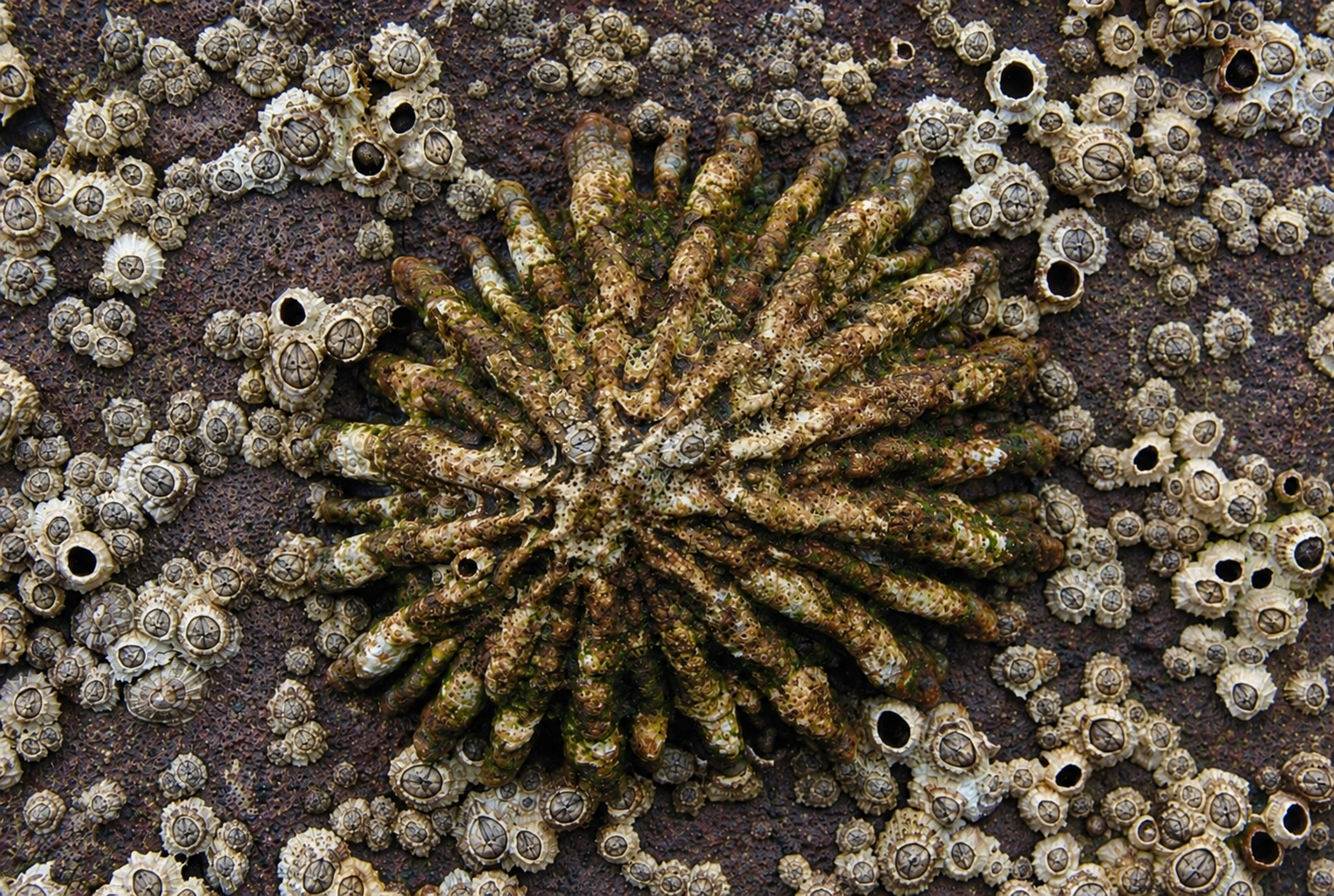
- Patella ferruginea from Melilla

Scientific classification
- Kingdom: Animalia
- Phylum: Mollusca
- Class: Gastropoda
- Subclass: Patellogastropoda
- Family: Patellidae
- Genus: Patella
- Species: P. ferruginea

Binomial name
- Patella ferruginea Gmelin, 1791

Synonyms
- List: Patella costosoplicata Mörch, 1853; Patella cypria Gmelin, 1791; Patella ferruginea f. ficarazzensis de Gregorio, 1884; Patella ferruginea var. imperatoria de Gregorio, 1884; Patella ferruginea f. percostata de Gregorio, 1884; Patella ferruginea var. sitta de Gregorio, 1884; Patella lamarckii Payraudeau, 1826; Patella lampedusensis de Gregorio, 1884; Patella luteola Lamarck, 1819; Patella medusa Röding, 1798; Patella pyramidata Lamarck, 1819; Patella rouxii Payraudeau, 1826; Patella stella Risso, 1826; Patella turtonia Risso, 1826; Patella vespertina Risso, 1826 (dubious synonym)

= Patella ferruginea =

Species of gastropod

Patella ferruginea, commonly known as the ferruginous limpet (sometimes, as the ribbed Mediterranean limpet) is a species of true limpet, a marine gastropod mollusk in the family Patellidae. It is a large limpet, endemic to the western Mediterranean Sea, and although common in the past, it is now rare and restricted to only a few locations.

== Description ==
Patella ferruginea is a distinctive large limpet with a thick heavy shell. It can exceed 100 mm (4 in) in diameter, but usually barely exceeds 70 mm. The robust, cone-shaped shell has thirty to fifty broad ridges and a wavy margin. The ribs are irregular and sometimes nodular; the shell is often worn smooth or covered with epibiotic organisms such as algae and barnacles. The external surface is cream-coloured or rusty brown, while the inside is marbled white with a dark muscle scar. The muscular foot is yellowish-orange with dark grey sides, and the tentacles are black. Juveniles have flattened shells which are whitish with dark concentric bands and a small number of broad ribs, giving them star-shaped outlines.

== Distribution and habitat ==
This limpet is restricted (endemic) to the Mediterranean Sea. In the past it had a wide range in the western Mediterranean, as evidenced by large shell middens formed by Paleolithic and Neolithic hunter gatherers. It is now limited to a few locations in northwestern Africa, one of which is the Al Hoceima National Park, as well as a few scattered locations in southern Spain, Gibraltar, Sardinia and Corsica, and some islets in the central Mediterranean. It lives on rocky surfaces in the intertidal zone. It is classified as an "endangered species" by Spain, and is the first invertebrate, as well as the first marine species, for which Spain has developed a national conservation strategy.

== Ecology ==
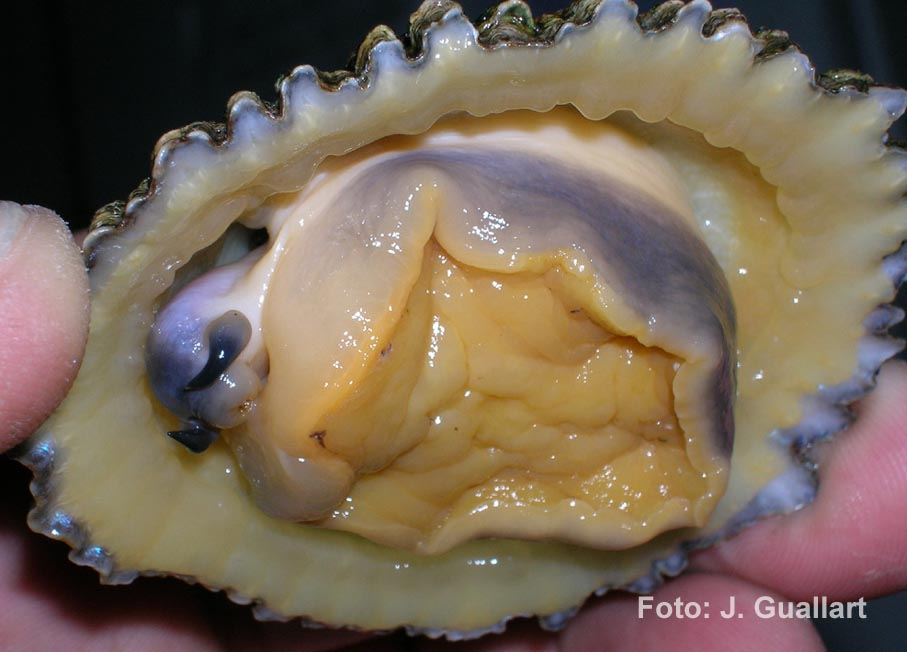
Patella ferruginea, ventral view

This limpet is found in the mid-littoral zone, at the lower end of the zone occupied by the barnacle Chthamalus stellatus and above that formed by red algae, where the gastropod mollusc Dendropoma petraeum is to be found. At night and when submerged, it travels to graze on the film of cyanobacteria and young algae that forms on rocks, returning to the same homing site each time the tide recedes. This spot is discernible because a ring of coralline algae develops under the edge of the shell. The limpet faces predation from the crabs Eriphia verrucosa and Pachygrapsus marmoratus, and the dog winkle Stramonita haemastoma.

Breeding takes place in the autumn at about the time of year when the first storms occur, with gametes being liberated into the sea. The larvae are planktonic for a while before settling in similar habitats to those occupied by the adults. This limpet appears to be a protrandrous hermaphrodite, smaller individuals always being male and the proportion of females among larger individuals increasing with size. However, there is some indication that individuals can change sex in either direction.

== Status ==
This limpet is on the verge of extinction in Spain, where fewer than a thousand individuals are thought to exist. More healthy populations are present in North Africa, with the largest being in Melilla, Ceuta and the Chafarinas Islands, as well as the Habibas Islands off the coast of Algeria. Populations in Sardinia and Corsica seem to be declining.
