= Tifarouine =

- Rural commune and town
- Location within Morocco Location within Africa
- Coordinates: 35.0825°N 3.8791°W
- Country: Morocco
- Region: Tanger-Tetouan-Al Hoceima
- Province: Al Hoceïma Province

Population (2004)
  - Total: 5,669
- Time zone: UTC+0 (GMT)

Tifarouine is a small town and rural commune in Al Hoceïma Province of the Tanger-Tetouan-Al Hoceima region of Morocco. At the time of the 2004 census, the commune had a total population of 5669 people living in 919 households.
