= Nekkour =

Coordinates: 35.0126°N 3.8642°W

- Rural commune and town
- Interactive map of Nekkour
- Country: Morocco
- Region: Tangier-Tetouan-Al Hoceima
- Province: Al Hoceïma Province

Population (2004)
  - Total: 11,524
- Time zone: UTC+0 (GMT)

Nekkour is a small town and rural commune in Al Hoceïma Province of the Tangier-Tetouan-Al Hoceima region of Morocco. At the time of the 2004 census, the commune had a total population of 11524 people living in 1919 households.
