= Mata (performance) =

Mata knights in action

Mata is an equestrian game and performance performed by the Beni Arous tribe typically in May or June in the village of Znied, in the municipality of Larbaa Ayacha, in the northwestern province of Larache, Morocco.

The competition takes place in the hills upon the tomb of the Sufi saint Abd al-Salam ibn Mashish with over 200 participants. Over the course of three days, tribal teams on horses ride bareback and vie for control of a female puppet, which symbolizes the fertility of the spring season, and take it across the finish line. Women typically fashion the puppet out of tissue and traditional fabrics, making it smell of roses and drawing a face on the doll. Historically, the rider who brought the puppet across the finish line was given the hand of the most beautiful woman of the tribe. Today, the prize is money and prestige. The equestrian display is thought to represent the relationship between man and nature and man and horse. For male riders, it is a representation of their warrior prowess, but there is a single woman who participates in the practice.

Although historically open only to men, the tradition recently welcomed its first female rider.

The practice is rumored to be a variation of the Afghan buzkashi game that the saint Abd al-Salam ibn Mashish saw in Asia and brought to Morocco where it was integrated with local customs.

For the past nine years, the Baraka family, descendants of Abd al-Salam ibn Mashish, have revitalized the tradition and sponsored the annual competition in association with the Alamiya Laaroussia Association and the UNESCO International Festival of Cultural Diversity. The festival also exhibits over 45 cooperatives in the region to promote the local handicrafts and products.

On 19 December 2023, ICESCO added the equestrian art of Mata as an intangible heritage of Morocco.

== See also ==
- Fantasia
- Buzkashi
