= Aisha Al-Manoubya =

Tunisian Sufi saint

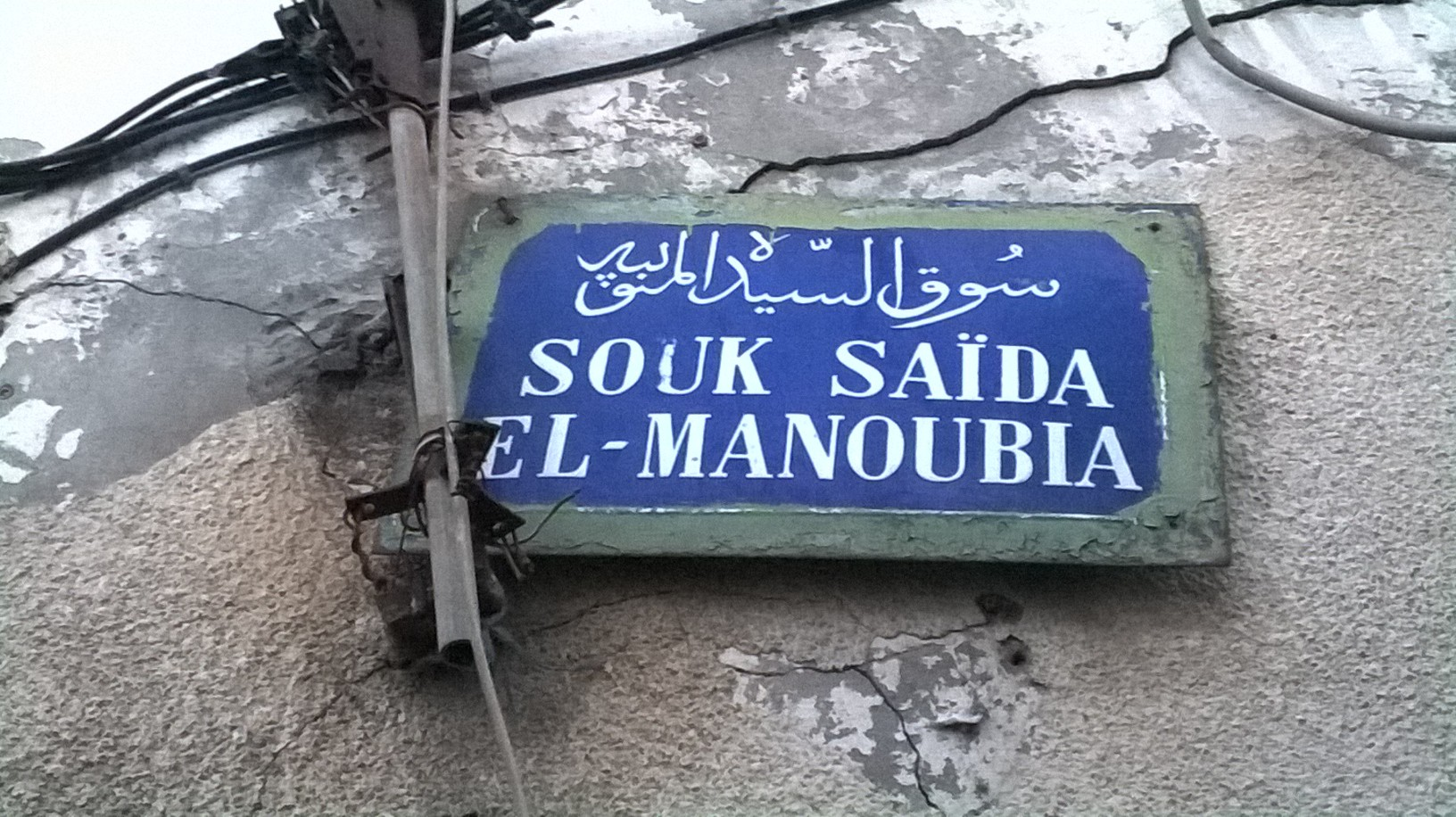
Souk Al Saida Al-Manoubya

Aïsha Al-Manoubya (Arabic: عائشة المنوبية, ʿĀʾisha al-Mannūbiyya), also known by the honorific As-Saida ('saint') or Lella ('the Lady') (1199–1267 CE), is one of the most famous women in Tunisian history and a prominent figure in Islam. She is one of the few women to have been granted the title of saint.

ʿĀʾisha was known for her Sufism and good deeds. She was the supporter and student of Sidi Bousaid al-Baji and Abul Hasan ash-Shadhili. Her activities in higher education, advocacy, and public acts of charity were unusual for her time given her sex.

== Life ==
Dates given for ʿĀʾisha's life vary slightly, but scholarly sources suggest she lived from 1199 to 1267 CE (595–665 AH).

According to the standard hagiography, ʿĀʾisha was born in the village of Manouba, near Tunis, and showed signs of her saintliness already in childhood, challenging social norms and effecting miraculous deeds (karamāt).

In portraying ʿĀʾisha's socially-transgressive behavior, narrations of her story tend to "alig[n] her with the Ṣūfī model of the 'blamable ones" (ahl al-malāma), those who went about transgressing social norms on purpose" (see also: Malamatiyya).

According to a popular narrative, "after her father had slaughtered a bull at her request, she cooked it, distributed its meat to villagers, and brought it back to life in order to reveal her sainthood," an event which was then "regularly commemorated in song during rituals held at her shrines."

ʿĀʾisha studied in Tunis with Shādhiliyya Ṣūfīs, moving back and forth between her rural home and urban Tunis. Prominent influences were the female mystic Rābiʿa al-ʿAdawiyya al-Qaysiyya (c. 95/714–185/801); Abū l-Ḥassan al-Shādhilī (c. 593–656/1196–1258), who founded the Shādhilī Ṣūfī order; the Baghdadi ʿAbd al-Qādir al-Jīlānī (470–561/1077 or 1078–1166, of Baghdad, namesake and patron of the Qādiriyya); and al-Junayd (d. 297/910), a Shāfiʿī scholar associated with Baghdad but originally of Persian origin.

ʿĀʾisha is one of the few women to have been the subject of a written saint's life (manāqib) in the Islamic world of her time, and she "represents a leading figure of women's sainthood in Islam." Whereas it was customary for female saints in her region to be recluses, ʿĀʾisha mixed with male society, including the poor, Sūfī scholars, and even the Ḥafṣīd sultan.

She had two shrines dedicated to her, one in La Manouba (destroyed in 2012) and the other in the Gorjani district of Tunis.

== Commemoration ==
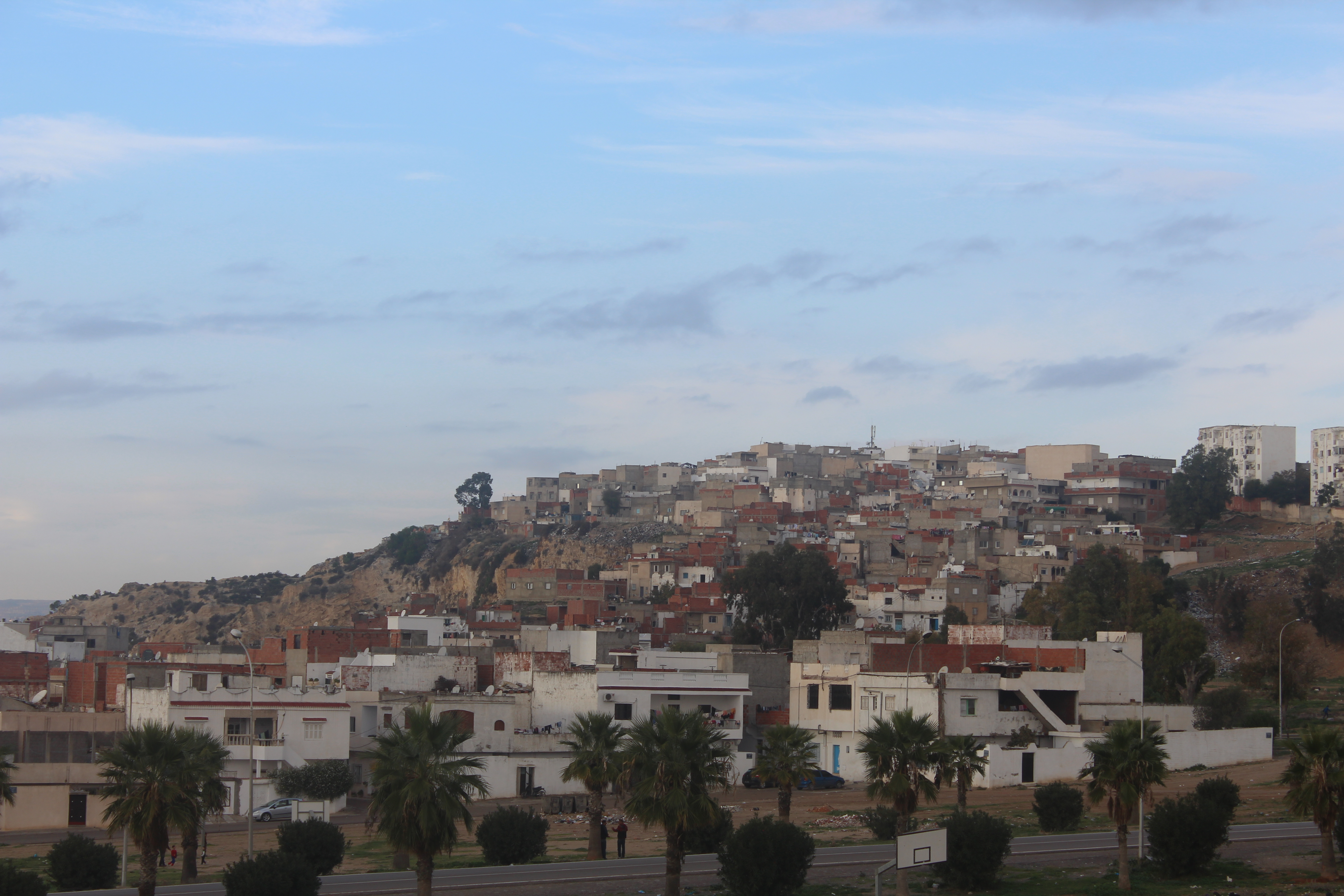
The neighbourhood Saida Al Manoubya in Tunis

In popular memory, ʿĀʾisha represents a powerful and respected saint. One of the souks of the Medina of Tunis, "Souk Es Sida El Manoubya," was named after her.

A few kilometres from the Medina, a gourbiville takes her name. Al-Manoubya used to retire to pray in that neighbourhood.

The inhabitants of Manouba built a second mausoleum to commemorate ʿĀʾisha under the name of "The Mausoleum of As-Saida Al-Manoubya" in her birthplace area. The Mausoleum is still famous today and valued in the field of Tunisian national heritage and history. It was vandalised and burned after the Tunisian Revolution on 16 October 2012.

Āʾisha's tomb in Manouba is frequented by women pilgrims every weekend, who sing songs of praise to God. The site has also become a centre of pilgrimage for women getting married, where brides seek blessings for a successful married life.

== Primary sources ==
- Manâqib as-Sayyida 'Â'isha al-Mannûbiyya (Tunis 1344/1925)
- Nelly Amri, La sainte de Tunis: Présentation et traduction de l'hagiographie de 'Â'isha al-Mannûbiyya (m. 665/1267) (Arles: Sindbad-Actes Sud, 2008)
- Âisha al-Mannûbiyya (v. 1198–1267), in Audrey Fella, Femmes en quête d'absolu: Anthologie de la mystique au féminin (Michel, 2016)

== Secondary studies ==
Many books and studies have discussed ʿĀʾisha's history. So, too, have cinema and Sufi songs and performances. Key scholarly studies of ʿĀʾisha include:

- Amri, Nelly, 'Femmes, sainteté et discours hagiographique au Maghreb médiéval: Naissance à la sainteté, naissance à l'histoire; Le case d'une sainte de Tunis, 'Â'isha al-Mannûbiyya (m. 665/1267)', in Histoire des femmes au Maghreb: Réponses à l'exclusion, ed. by Mohamed Monkachi (Morocco: Faculté des Lettres de Kénitra, 1999), 253–74. Amri, Nelly, Les Femmes soufies ou la passion de Dieu (St-Jean-de-Bray: Dangles, 1992)
- Abū 'Abd al-Raḥmān al-Sulamī, Early Sufi Women: Dhikr an-Niswa al-Muta'abbidat as-Sufiyyat, trans. by Rkia Cornell (1999)
- Katia Boissevain, Sainte parmi les saints. Sayyida Mannūbiya ou les recompositions cultuelles dans la Tunisie contemporaine (2006)

== See also ==
- List of female Islamic scholars
- Islam in Tunisia
- List of Sufi Saints
