= Ad Novas =

Ad Novas is the name of ancient Roman towns:

- Santa Maria a Vico: town in Italy
- Ad Novas (Morocco): an ancient town likely at Bni Arouss, Morocco
