= Jazzablanca =

Annual jazz festival in Morocco

- Genre: Jazz
- Dates: July
- Location(s): Casablanca, Morocco
- Years active: 2006–present
- Founders: Seven PM
- Website: jazzablanca.com

Jazzablanca is an international jazz festival held annually in Casablanca, Morocco, since 2006. Usually taking place in early July, the festival spans several days of concerts, cultural events, and educational activities, attracting both local and international audiences.

The festival features a diverse program that combines jazz, contemporary music, and world music. It hosts internationally renowned artists as well as emerging talents. In addition to concerts, Jazzablanca organizes cultural and educational events through its OFF program.

== History ==
Jazzablanca was founded in 2006 by the Moroccan production company Seven PM with the aim of making jazz more accessible and promoting musical diversity. Over the years, it has grown significantly in scope and reputation, becoming one of the leading music festivals in Morocco.

== Venues and Stages ==
In recent editions, the festival has taken place exclusively at Anfa Park, a large open space in Casablanca. Two stages are set up on the site:

- Casa Anfa Stage: The festival's main stage, ticketed, hosting national and international headliners.
- Stage 21: A smaller stage showcasing up-and-coming artists.

== The OFF Program ==
Running alongside the main concerts, the OFF program strengthens the festival's cultural and educational mission. It includes musical initiation workshops for children, master classes and round tables for both professionals and enthusiasts, and free concerts throughout the city.

== Notable Artists ==
Over the years, Jazzablanca has hosted a range of celebrated international artists, including:

- Al Jarreau: a jazz vocal legend and multiple Grammy Awards winner.
- Chick Corea: one of the most influential jazz pianists of the 20th century.
- Marcus Miller: renowned bassist and producer, known for his collaborations with Miles Davis.
- Gloria Gaynor: iconic disco figure, best known for the global hit "I Will Survive."
- Jason Mraz: pop singer-songwriter recognized for hits like "I'm Yours."
- Patti Smith: legendary rock artist and key figure in the American punk movement.
- LP: pop-rock singer widely popular for hits like "Lost on You."
- Aloe Blacc: known for "I Need a Dollar" and his collaboration with Avicii.
- Al Di Meola: virtuoso guitarist and a major figure in jazz fusion.
- Esperanza Spalding: jazz bassist and vocalist, winner of multiple Grammy Awards.
- Billy Cobham: iconic jazz fusion drummer, notably with the Mahavishnu Orchestra.
