= Al-Baji =

al-Baji is a surname. Notable people with the surname include:

- Abu al-Walid al-Baji (c. 1013–c. 1081), Andalusi scholar
- Abu Said al-Baji (1156–1231), Arab Sufi scholar

== See also ==
- Beji Caid Essebsi (1926–2019), Tunisian politician
