= Humaithara =

Humaithara حميثرة (in Arabic)
- Town
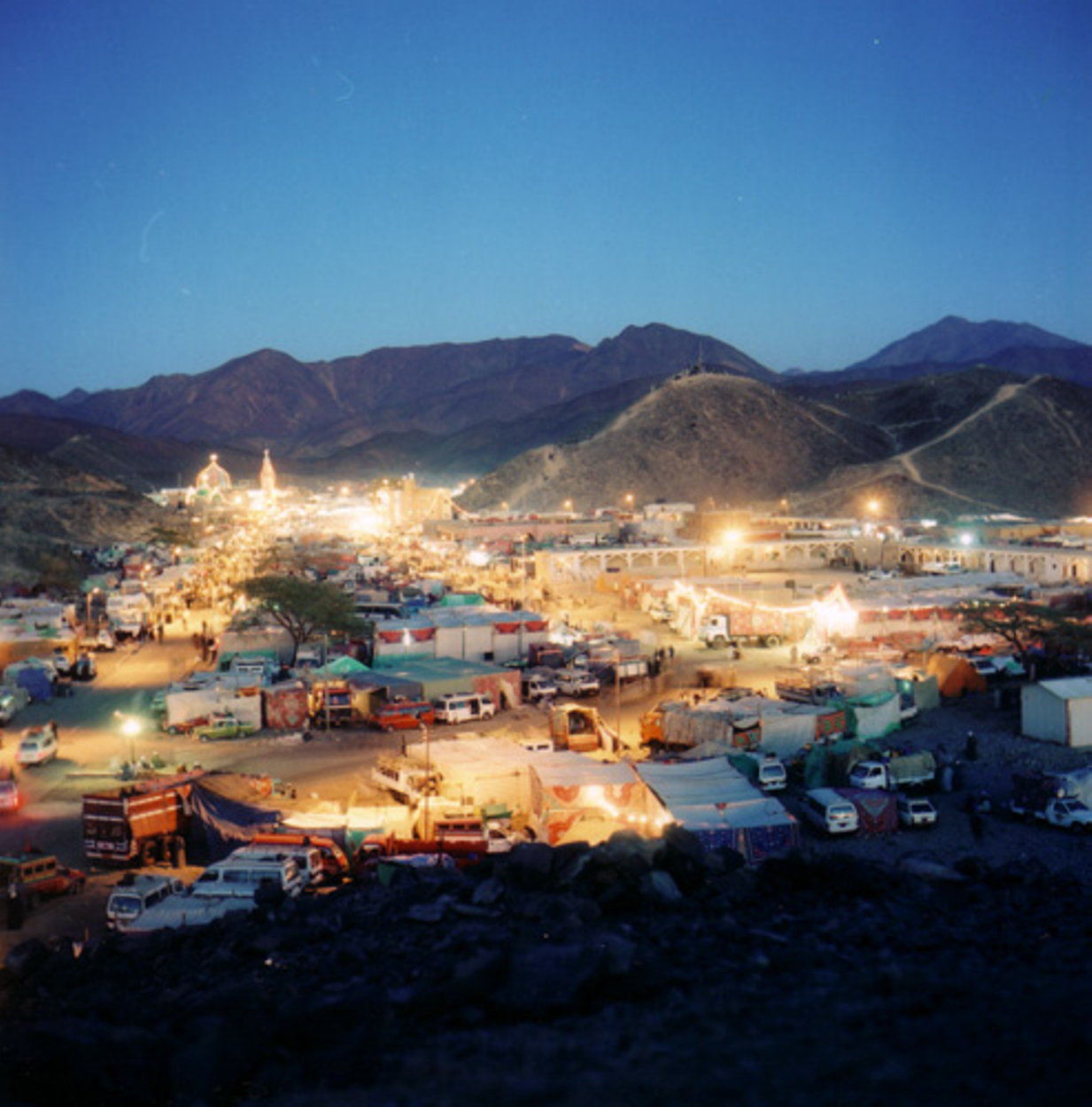
- View of Humaithara during the ʻurs of al-Shadhili

- Location within Egypt
- Coordinates: 24°12′2.66″N 34°38′8.33″E
- Country: Egypt
- Governorate: Red Sea

Population (2012)
  - Total: 4,218
- Time zone: UTC+2 (EET)
  - Summer (DST): UTC+3 (EEST)

Abu Al Hassan El-Shazly or Sheikh Shazly as called now or the original name Humaithara (Arabic: حميثرة Ḥumaythirah, also spelled "Humaisara," "Al Maithara") or Sheikh Shazily (Arabic. الشيخ الشاذلى) (as it is called in Egypt now) is an isolated town in the Egyptian desert located in the Red Sea Governorate in Egypt. The town is surrounded by hills. The Holy Shrine of Imām Nūr al-Dīn Abū al-Ḥasan ʻAlī al-Shādhilī is located here.

== The shrine of Imam Shadhili ==
Humaithara is well known in the Islamic pilgrimage map for the highly venerated tomb of Imam Shadhili. It takes around 3 hours by road from Aswan, 4–5 hours from Edfu.

=== The core tomb ===
The core tomb building in which Imam Shadhili's grave is found was constructed in the year 1259 (656 Hijri), immediately after the death of Imam Shadhili.

=== The extended building ===
After the late 13th century, the number of pilgrims visiting the grave of Imam Shadhili increased and the shrine was extended in order to accommodate large numbers of people. The visitors to this shrine include Imam Fassi of Makkah, who is also called the second al-Shadhili and one of his important disciples, his 21st khalifah, and the founder of the Fassiya branch of the Shadhili order. Almost all leaders (shuyūkh) from Bait Al Fassi, Makkah have visited the shrine of Imam Shadhili, their shaykh here in Humaithara.

=== The well of Humaithara ===
There is a well outside the shrine. Imam Shadhili's gargled water was poured into this well on the day before his death. The water in this well is located in the midst of a desert but never goes dry throughout the year. The water of this well is pure and it serves the drinking water needs of the local villages.

== Transport ==
The airports closer to Humaithara are Marsa Alam Airport and Aswan International Airport. Bus services are available from Cairo, Aswan, and Marsa Alam. Taxi and rickshaw services are not available in the locality of Humaithara.

== Climate ==
Humaithara is one of Egypt's driest and hottest localities.

Climate data for Humaithara, Egypt
Month	Jan	Feb	Mar	Apr	May	Jun	Jul	Aug	Sep	Oct	Nov	Dec	Year
Mean daily maximum °C (°F)	22.9 (73.2)	25.2 (77.4)	29.5 (85.1)	34.9 (94.8)	38.9 (102.0)	41.4 (106.5)	41.1 (106.0)	40.9 (105.6)	39.3 (102.7)	35.9 (96.6)	29.1 (84.4)	24.3 (75.7)	33.6 (92.5)
Mean daily minimum °C (°F)	8.7 (47.7)	10.2 (50.4)	13.8 (56.8)	18.9 (66.0)	23.0 (73.4)	25.2 (77.4)	26.0 (78.8)	25.8 (78.4)	24.0 (75.2)	20.6 (69.1)	15.0 (59.0)	10.5 (50.9)	18.5 (65.3)
Average rainfall mm (inches)	0.0 (0.0)	0.0 (0.0)	0.0 (0.0)	0.0 (0.0)	0.1 (0.00)	0.0 (0.0)	0.0 (0.0)	0.7 (0.03)	0.0 (0.0)	0.6 (0.02)	0.0 (0.0)	0.0 (0.0)	1.4 (0.05)
Average precipitation days	0.0	0.0	0.0	0.0	0.1	0.0	0.0	0.5	0.0	0.25	0.0	0.0	0.85
Average relative humidity (%)	40	32	24	19	17	16	18	21	22	27	36	42	26
Mean monthly sunshine hours	298	281	322	316	347	363	375	360	298	315	300	289	3,864
Source 1: World Meteorological Organization
Source 2: The Weather Network

== See also ==
- Abul Hasan ash-Shadhili
- Abul Abbas al-Mursi
- Al-Busiri
- Ibn Ata Allah
- Al-Fassi family
