= Sidi Belhassen Chedly Mausoleum =

Zawiya in Tunis, Tunisia

- سيدي بلحسن الشاذلي
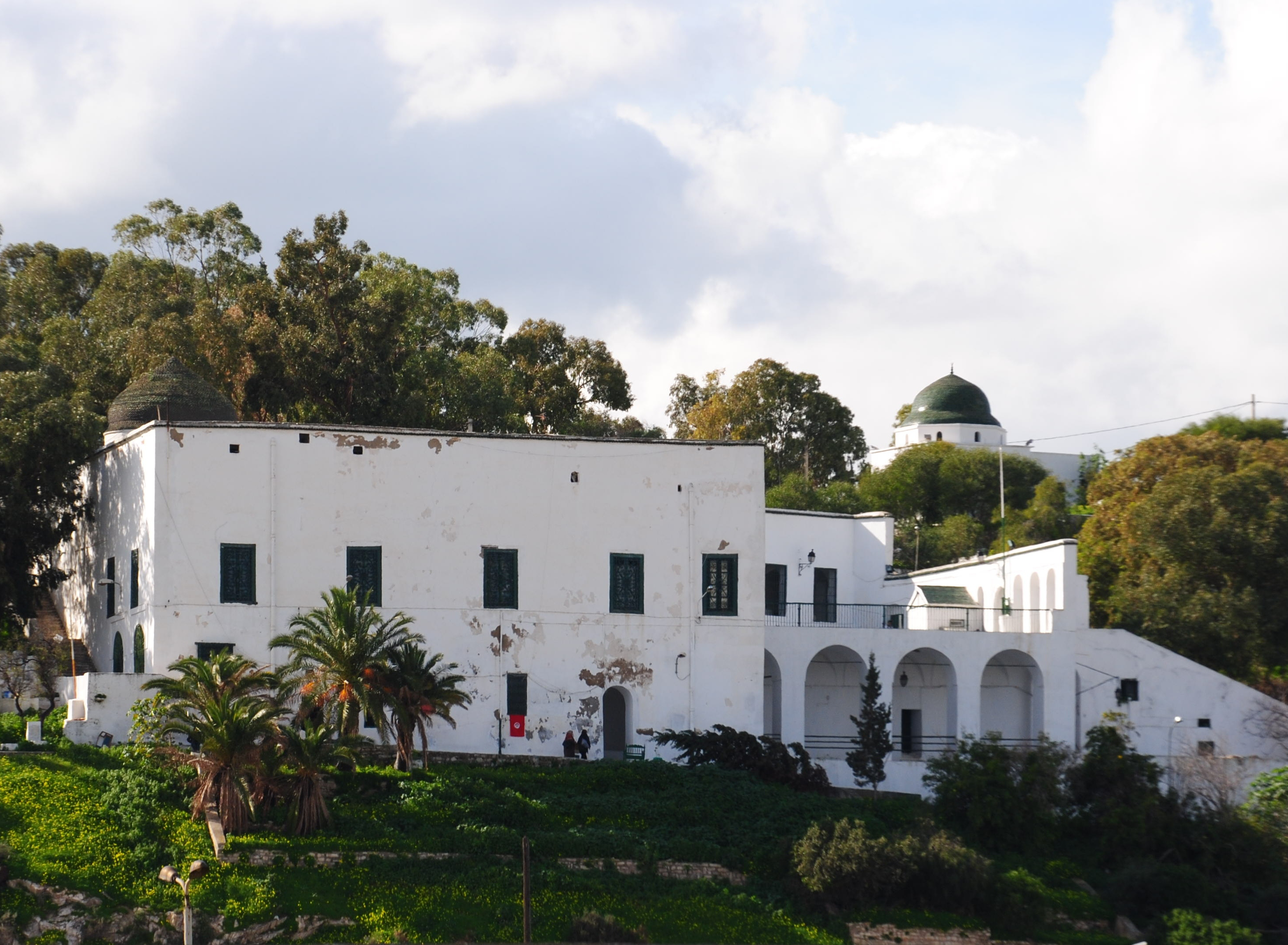
- General view of the Sidi Belhassen Chedly mausoleum
- Interactive map of Sidi Belhassen Chedly Mausoleum
- Location: Tunisia
- Type: Mausoleum

Sidi Belhassen Chedly Mausoleum is a mausoleum in Tunisia, located near the Jellaz cemetery south of Tunis.

== Description ==
The mausoleum is built on the place of spiritual retreats and teaching of one of the most revered Sufi saints in the Maghreb, Abu Hassan al-Shadhili. It has been rebuilt more than a dozen times since his death in Egypt in 1258.

The mausoleum consists of two sites, the first of which, the Kabira Mamiyya tourbet, located on the highest point of the hill, is built on the place of retirement and residence of the saint and houses the symbolic tomb of Abu Hassan al-Shadhili. In its current form, it was built by Abu l-Hasan Ali I in the 1740s, a large annex room shelters the tombs of his wife, the pious Kabira Mamiyya who gave his name to the building, and of several other women of the princely house of the Husainid dynasty

== Gallery ==
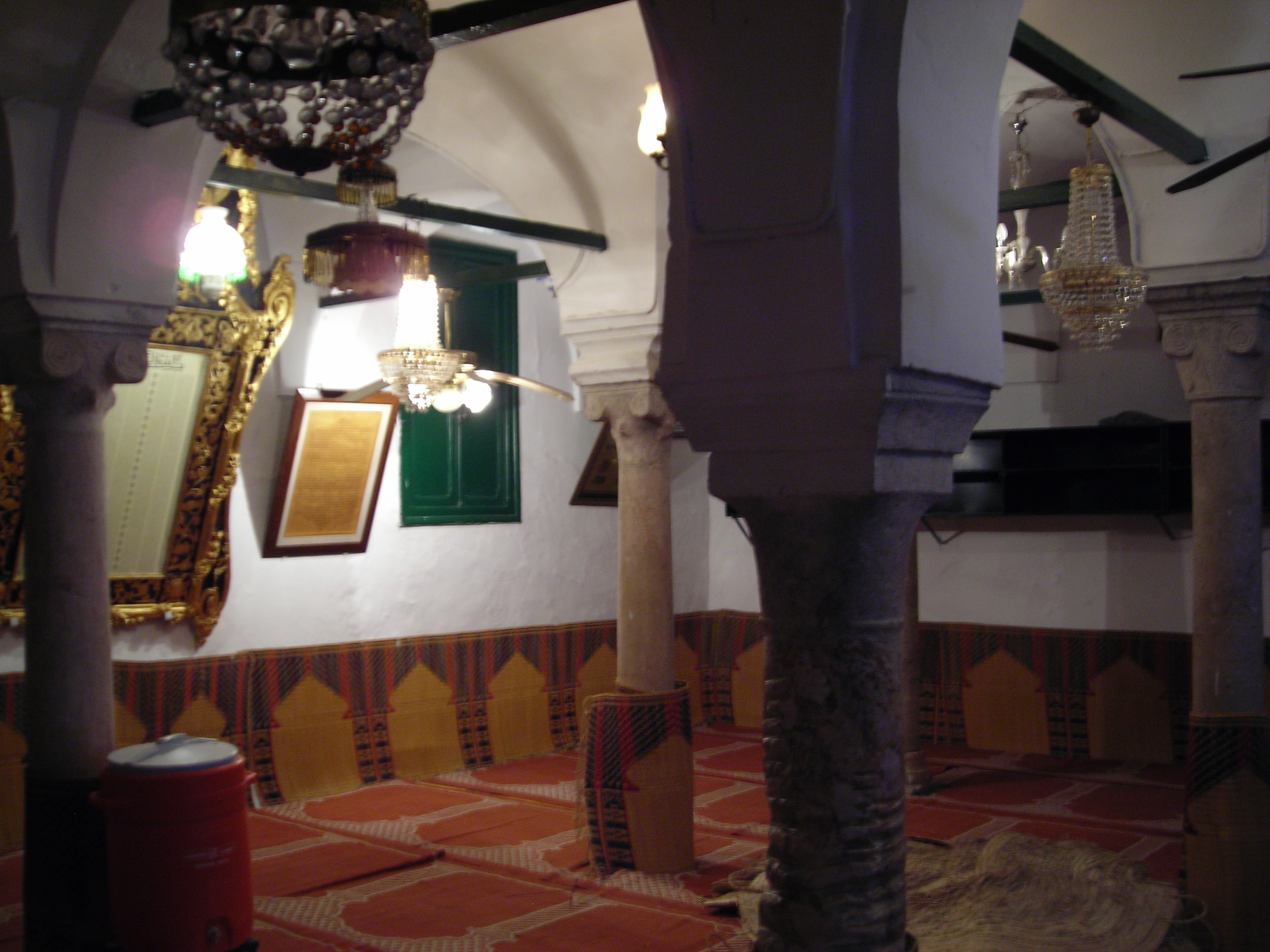
Inside the mausoleum

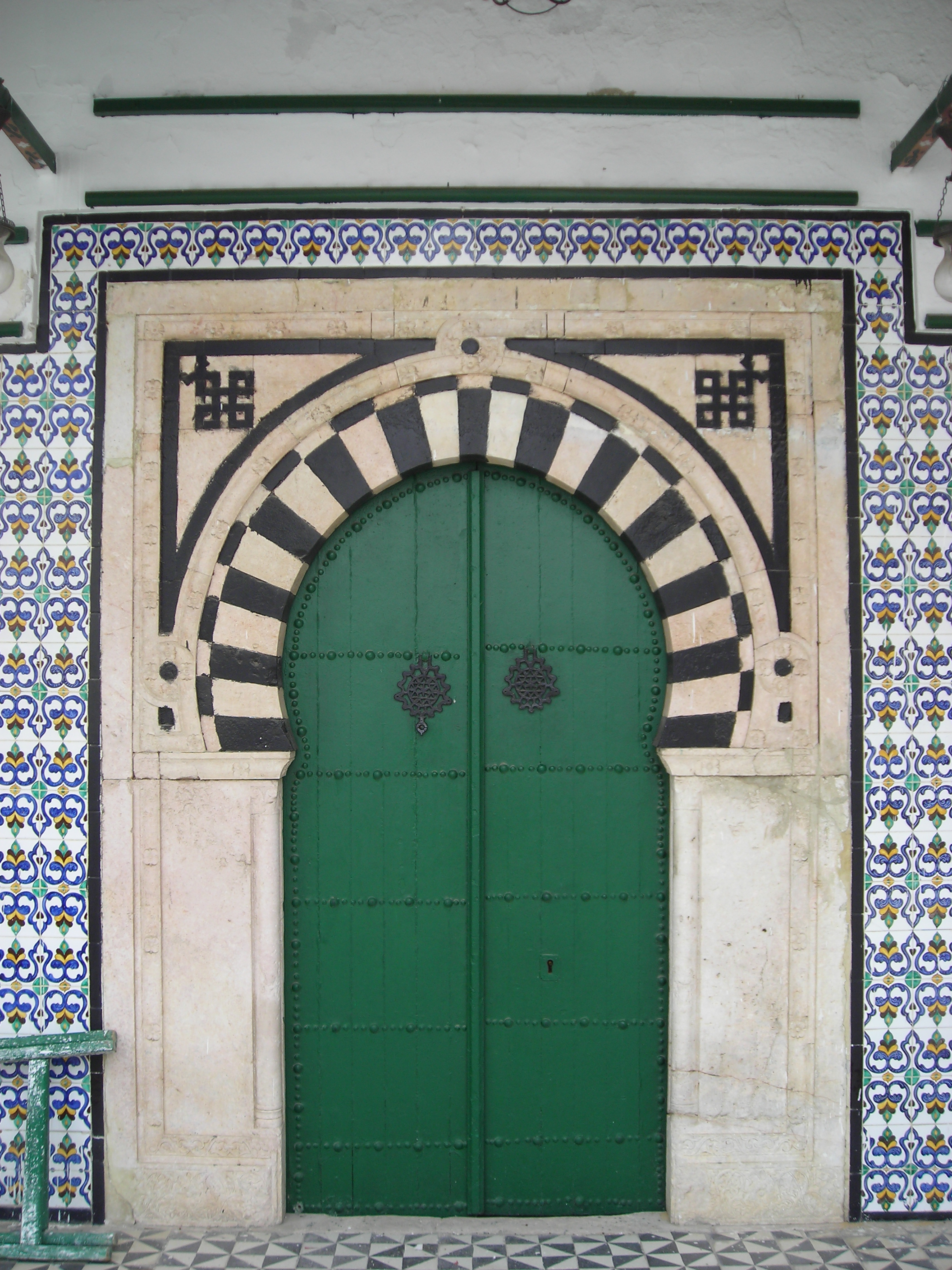
Door of Sidi Belhassen Chedly Mausoleum

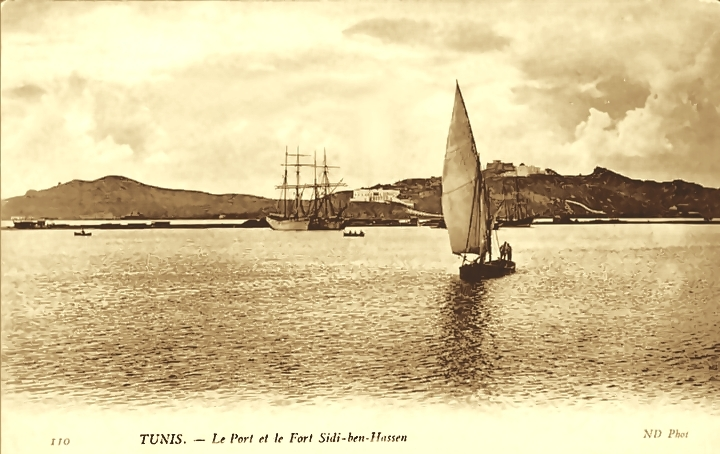
Sidi Belhassen Chedly Mausoleum in 1900

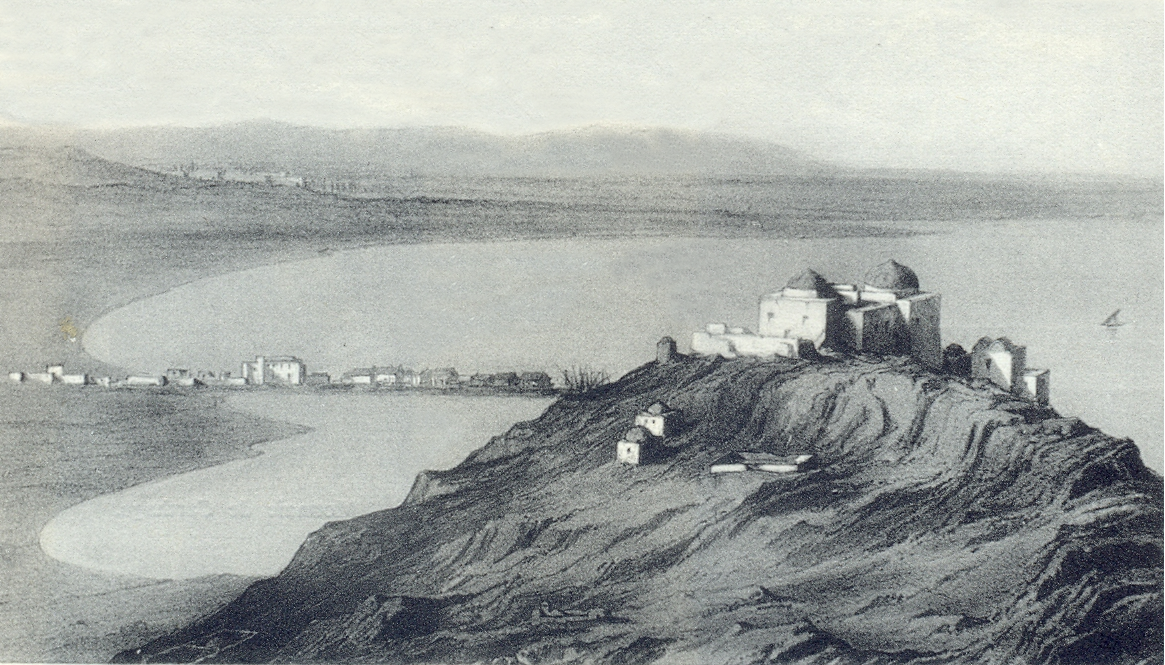
View from the summit of Djellaz in 1846, with the Kabira Mamiyya tourbet and Lake Tunis in the background
