= Ksar el-Kebir =

City in Tanger-Tetouan-Al Hoceima, Morocco

Ksar el-Kebir القصر الكبير
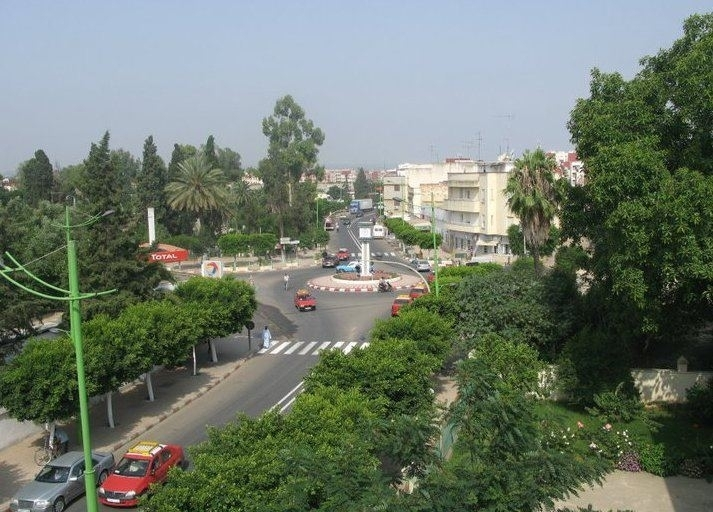
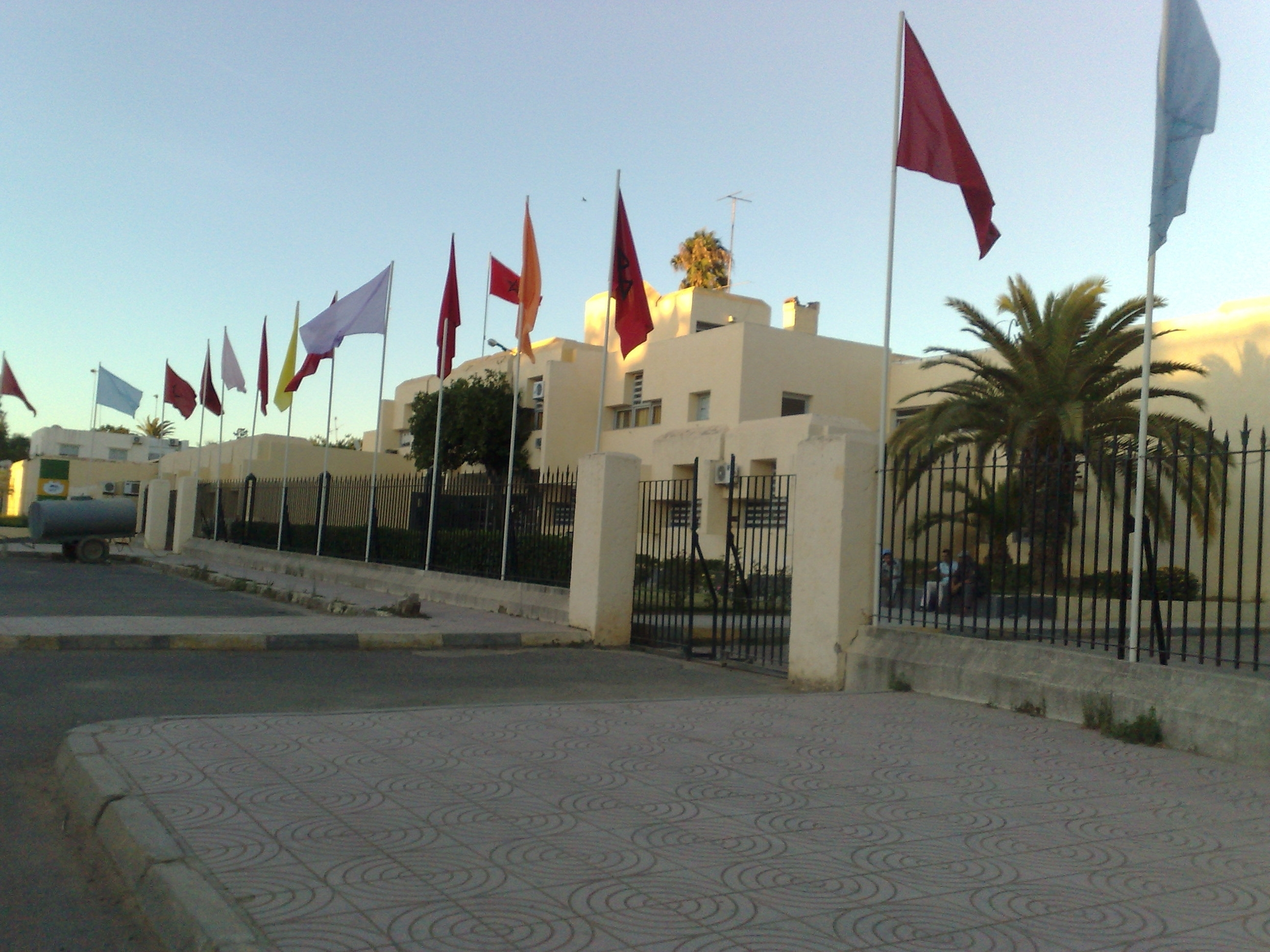
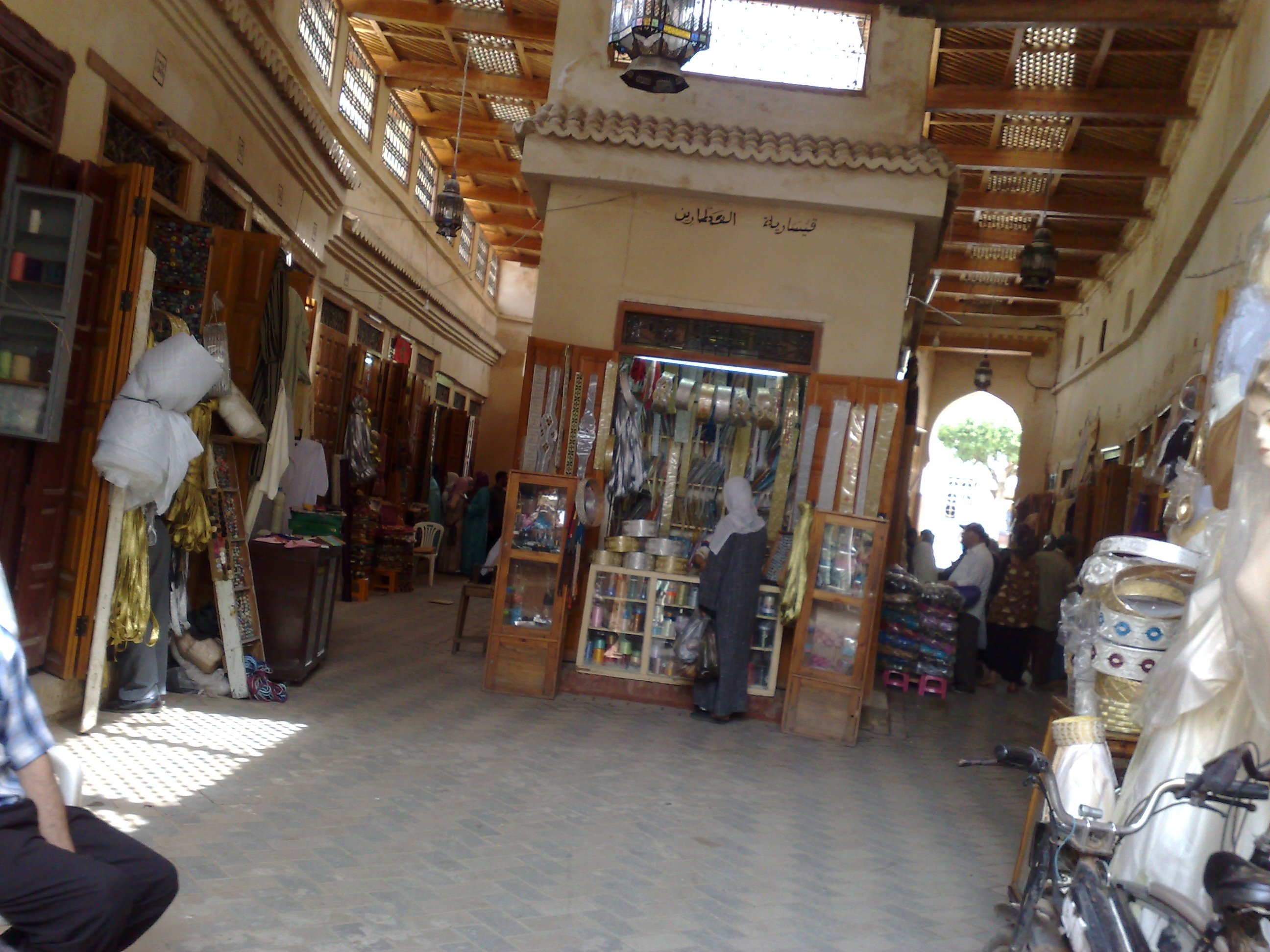
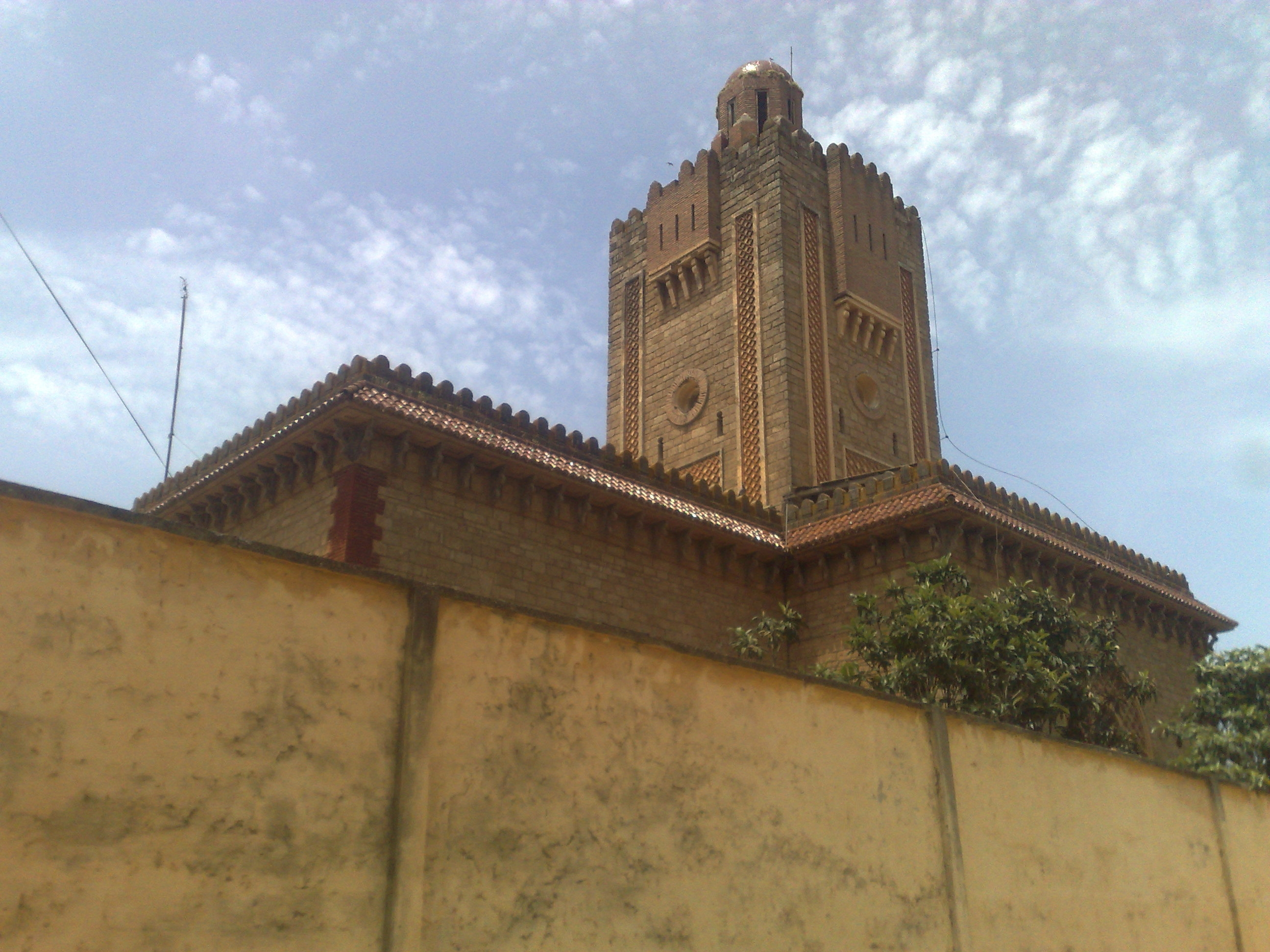

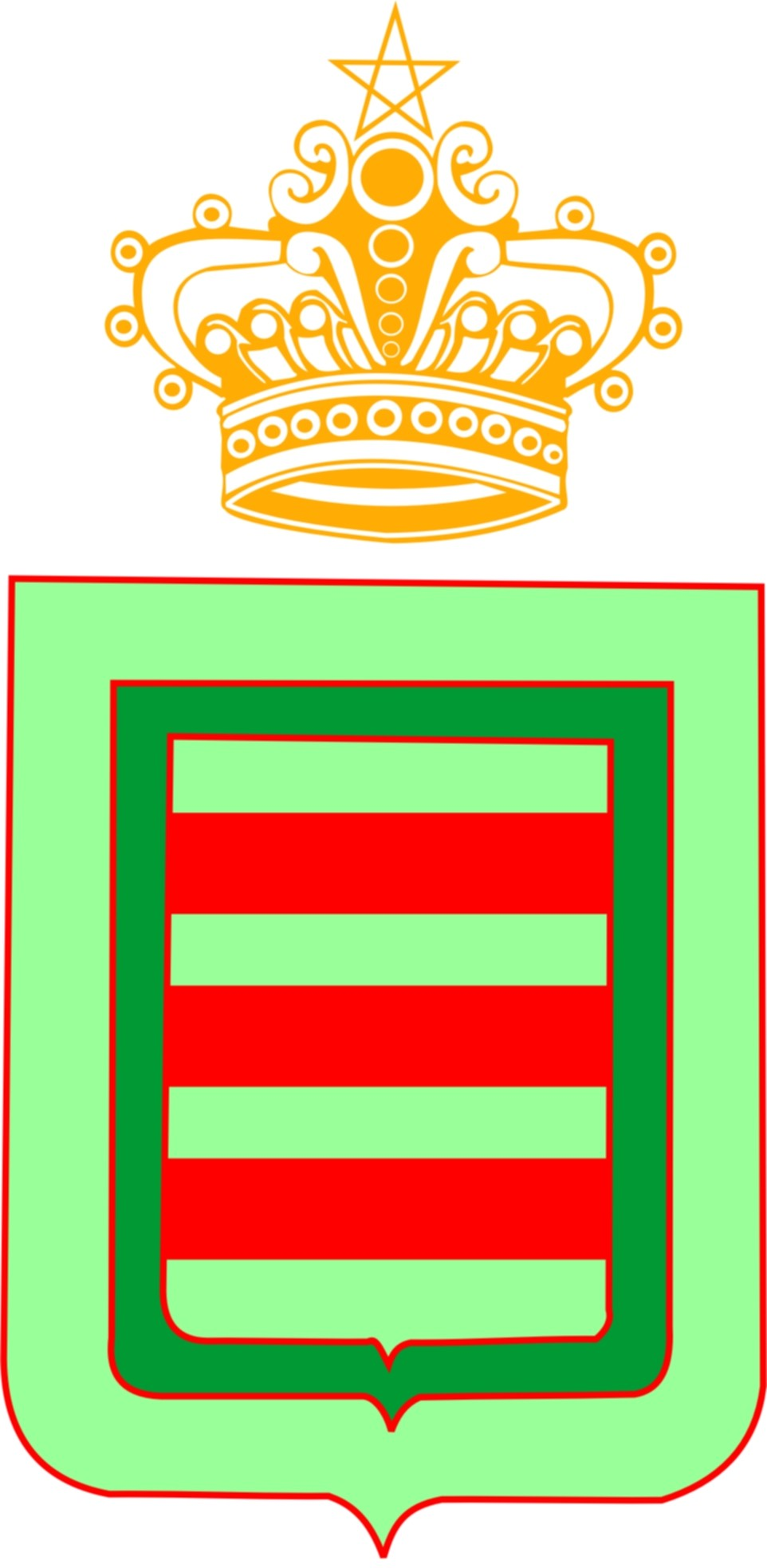
- Seal
- Interactive map of Ksar el-Kebir
- Coordinates: 34°59′56″N 5°54′10″W
- Country: Morocco
- Region: Tanger-Tetouan-Al Hoceima
- Province: Larache

Government
  - Mayor: Mohamed Simo

Population (2024)
  - Total: 124,701
  - Rank: 26th in Morocco
- Time zone: UTC+0 (GMT)
- Website: Official website

Ksar el-Kebir (Arabic: القصر الكبير, romanized: al-Qaṣr al-Kabīr, Spanish : Alcazarquivir), also known as al-Qasr al-Kabir, and Alcazarquivir is a city in northwestern Morocco, about 160 kilometres (99 mi) north of Rabat, 32 kilometres (20 mi) east of Larache and 110 kilometres (68 mi) south of Tangier. It recorded a population of 124,701 in the 2024 Moroccan census.

The name means "the big castle". The city is located nearby the Loukous River, making El-Ksar-el-Kebir one of Morocco's richest agricultural regions. El-Ksar el-Kebir provides almost 20% of the needed sugar of Morocco.

Neighbouring cities and towns include Larache, Chefchaouen, Arbaoua, and Tatoft.

== History ==
It came under Roman control with the name Oppidum Novum.

In 1578, King Sebastian of Portugal suffered a crushing defeat in the Battle of Alcácer Quibir at the hands of the King Abd al-Malik of Morocco, which ended Portugal's ambitions to invade and Christianize the Maghreb. Both kings died during the battle, as did Abdallah Mohammed, who was allied with Sebastian. The death of King Sebastian started the events which led to the temporary union of the crowns of Portugal and Spain under Philip II of Spain. King Abd al-Malik's victory gave Morocco substantial strength and international prestige.

The city experienced substantial growth with the settling of a critical garrison in 1911 as a part of the Spanish protectorate in Morocco. After Morocco's independence and the Oued el Makhazine reservoir was built by King Hassan II to manage the Loukkos' river regime, and the city became an important regional agricultural distribution center.

- 12th century: According to Leo Africanus, city walls were built by the command of the Abu Yusuf Yaqub al-Mansur.
- 1578: The Battle of Alcácer Quibir, or Battle of the Three Kings, is fought here.
- 17th century: Sultan Moulay Ismail destroyed the city walls of Ksar el-Kebir after being angered by a local chief.
- 1912: Establishment of the spanish Protectorate in northern Morocco including the city of Ksar el-Kebir

On 12 February 2026, severe flooding hit Ksar el-Kebir after heavy rains caused the Loukkos River to overflow, submerging neighborhoods and forcing thousands to flee. The army and emergency forces helped evacuate residents, leaving large parts of the city nearly deserted as cleanup operations began.

== Culture ==
El-Ksar el-Kebir is reputed for the leading artists, writers, poets, and sportsmen on the national plane.

- In sports, football player Abdeslam Laghrissi still keeps his record as the best marksman in the Moroccan championship with 26 goals in 1986.
- In music, Abdessalam Amer (died 1979), who is well known in the Arab world as a unique music composer. He left such eternal songs as: Red Moon, Beach, Leaving, The Last Oh!.
- In poetry, Mohamed El Khammar El Guennouni (died 1991) was a pioneer in modern Moroccan poetry and is regarded as master of free poetry in Morocco. There is also poet Ouafae El Amrani in the new poetic generation.
- In novel-writing, there are such novelists as Mohamed Aslim, Mohamed Harradi, Mohamed Tetouani, Mohamed Sibari and Moustafa Jebari.
- In short-story writing, there is Mohamed Said Raihani, who is a trilingual writer (he writes in Arabic, French and English) and who has finished his fortieth manuscript before reaching the age of forty.

== Notable people ==
- Abdeslam Laghrissi, professional footballer
- Mohamed Katir, professional runner
- Yehuda Benasouli, former Chief Rabbi of Madrid, Spain
- Hamid El Kasri, Gnawa music singer
- Mohamed Sibari, poet, novelist and translator

== Twin towns ==
- Lagos, Portugal
