= Zaaroura =

Coordinates: 35°13′N 5°40′W

- Rural commune and town
- Interactive map of Zaaroura
- Country: Morocco
- Region: Tanger-Tetouan-Al Hoceima
- Province: Larache

Population (2004)
  - Total: 12,931
- Time zone: UTC+0 (GMT)

Zaaroura is a small town and rural commune in Larache Province of the Tanger-Tetouan-Al Hoceima region of Morocco. At the time of the 2004 census, the commune had a total population of 12,931 people living in 2,459 households.
