= Mohamed Sibari =

Moroccan poet, novelist and translator

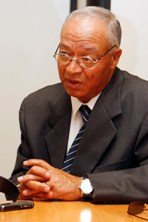
Mohamed Sibari (1945-2013)

Mohamed Sibari (1945 – 28 November 2013) was a Moroccan poet, novelist, and translator. He wrote books in both Arabic and Spanish.

Sibari was born in Ksar El-Kebir. He was awarded the Spanish National Cross of Merit in 2003, and the Pablo Neruda prize for literature in 2004. In 2010, he won Naji Naaman's Literary Prize in the category of honor awards.
