= Laouamra =

Coordinates: 31°48′N 8°43′W

- Rural commune and town
- Interactive map of Laouamra
- Country: Morocco
- Region: Tanger-Tetouan-Al Hoceima
- Province: Larache

Population (2004)
  - Total: 35,161
- Time zone: UTC+0 (GMT)

Laouamra is a small town and rural commune in Larache Province of the Tanger-Tetouan-Al Hoceima region of Morocco. At the time of the 2004 census, the commune had a total population of 35,161 people living in 5205 households.
