= Ksar Bjir =

- Rural commune and town
- Location within Morocco Location within Africa
- Coordinates: 34.9516°N 5.9163°W
- Country: Morocco
- Region: Tanger-Tetouan-Al Hoceima
- Province: Larache

Population (2004)
  - Total: 14,876
- Time zone: UTC+0 (GMT)

Ksar Bjir is a small town and rural commune in Larache Province of the Tanger-Tetouan-Al Hoceima region of Morocco. At the time of the 2004 census, the commune had a total population of 14,876 people living in 2583 households.
