= List of festivals in Morocco =

This is a list of festivals held in the African country of Morocco.

== List of festivals in Morocco ==
- Atlas Electronic, Marrakesh
- Bashikh festival, Senhaja de Srair
- Candles Convoy of Salé (also known as Moussem of Candles), Salé
- Festival Taragalte (nomadic culture), M'Hamid El Ghizlane
- Gnaoua World Music Festival, Essaouira
- Imilchil Marriage Festival, Imilchil
- Marrakech International Film Festival, Marrakesh
- Marrakech Biennale, Marrakesh
- Marrakesh Folklore Days, Marrakesh
- Mata, nearby Larache (equestrian performance)
- Mawazine (music festival), Rabat
- Merzouga International Music Festival, Merzouga
- Sefrou Cherry Festival, Sefrou
- World Sacred Music Festival, Fez

== See also ==
- Culture of Morocco
- Moroccan music
