= Sefrou Cherry Festival =

Annual festival in Sefrou, Morocco

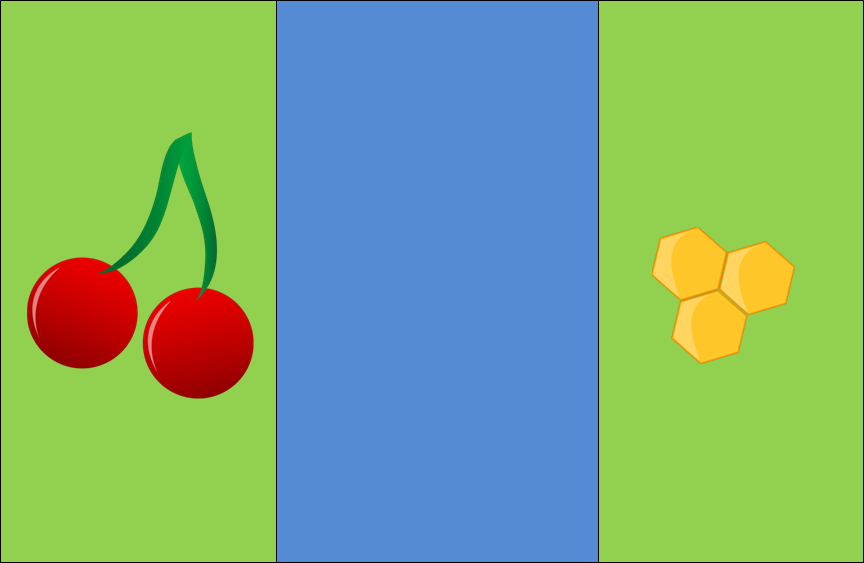
- Flag of Sefrou Province containing cherries and honey, for which the region is known
- Genre: Festival
- Frequency: Annual
- Locations: Sefrou, Morocco
- Inaugurated: 1920

Cherry festival in Sefrou
- UNESCO Intangible Cultural Heritage
- Country: Morocco
- Reference: 00641
- Region: Arab States

Inscription history
- Inscription: 2012 (7th session)
- List: Representative

The Cherry Festival of Sefrou, also known as the Cherry Feast or Moussem Hab Al-Moulouk ("festival of the fruit of kings"), is an event held every year in Sefrou, Morocco, about twenty kilometers from Fez. It takes place over three days in June.

Its origin dates back to 1920, and in 2012, it was inscribed by UNESCO on the Representative List of the Intangible Cultural Heritage of Humanity.

The festival celebrates Moroccan folklore, including Fantazia, and dancing such as the traditional Berber dance Ahidus. It also features cultural, artistic, and sporting events. One of the activities that take place during the festival is the beauty pageant event where women from different cities of Morocco compete for the title of Cherry Queen. This used to be a symbol of religious co-existence, due to the participation of Muslim, Jewish, and Christian girls. After the Moroccan independence from France, the French population left, soon followed by the Moroccan Jewish community, and the participants now are exclusively from the local Muslim population.

== The event ==
Each year, several organizations oversee and participate in the organization of this event, which lasts three days (Friday, Saturday, and Sunday) in June: days filled with dancing, singing, and parades under the presidency of the "Cherry Queen" (or "Miss Cerisette"), chosen from among the most beautiful female candidates. In parallel, various sports and cultural activities are organized.

During this cultural and festive event, which contributes to local tourism, an exhibition and sale of various types of cherries grown in the Sefrou oasis and its surroundings is also held.

== History ==
The festival was created in 1920. In 1934, it was officially named the "Cherry Festival," and the straw doll was replaced by a real queen. At first, French and Jewish women volunteered to play the role of the festival queen, before Muslim girls also began to participate, bringing a new human dimension that reflected the values of coexistence and tolerance that characterized the city. This blend of cultures and religions continued even after Morocco's independence, making Sefrou a symbol of cultural diversity, where Muslims, Jews, and Christians lived side by side in both the old and new quarters of the city.

The festival was an opportunity for creativity, the showcasing of beauty, and the celebration of cherries, with awards given to the best producers. Over time, the ways of celebrating evolved to adapt to changes in Moroccan society, and the festival became better organized thanks to the efforts of local and regional authorities, the support of institutional partners, and the involvement of both the public and private sectors.

== Cherries of Sefrou ==
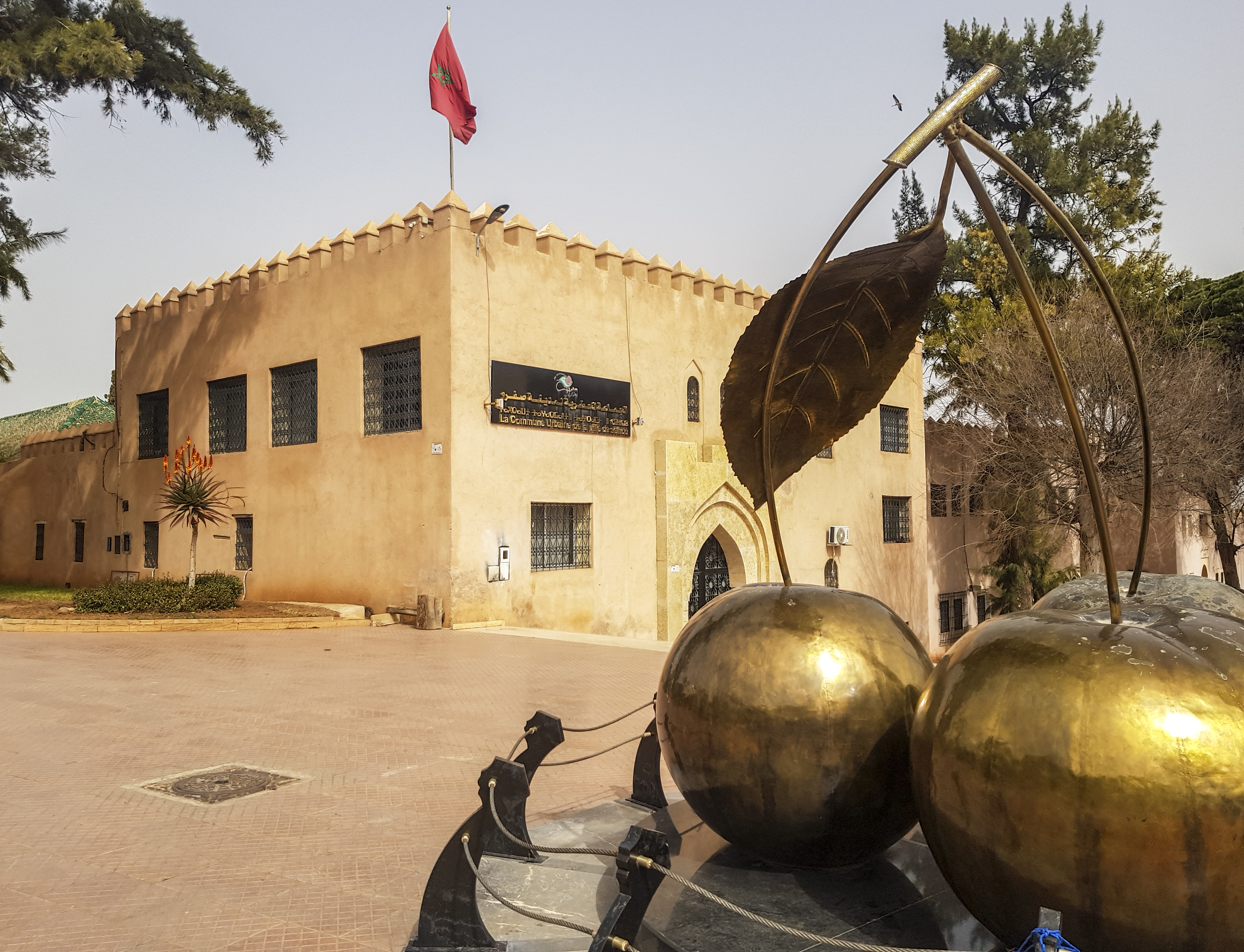
A cherry sculpture in a park in the city of Sefrou.

The cherry of Sefrou, or el-Beldi, is a small black cherry, very sweet when ripe, found in Morocco. According to tradition, its stem is believed to have healing properties.

This variety of sweet cherry fell victim to the introduction of certain American varieties that live in symbiosis with a parasite, which proved fatal to the local cherry. Thousands of trees were uprooted toward the end of the 1960s.

== See also ==
- List of festivals in Morocco
