= Souk L'Qolla =

- Rural commune and town
- Interactive map of Souk L'Qolla
- Coordinates: 35.0718°N 5.5702°W
- Country: Morocco
- Region: Tanger-Tetouan-Al Hoceima
- Province: Larache

Population (2004)
  - Total: 16,903
- Time zone: UTC+0 (GMT)

Souk L'Qolla is a small town and rural commune in Larache Province of the Tanger-Tetouan-Al Hoceima region of Morocco. At the time of the 2004 census, the commune had a total population of 16,903 people living in 2933 households.
