= Candles Convoy of Salé =

Festival in Salé, Morocco

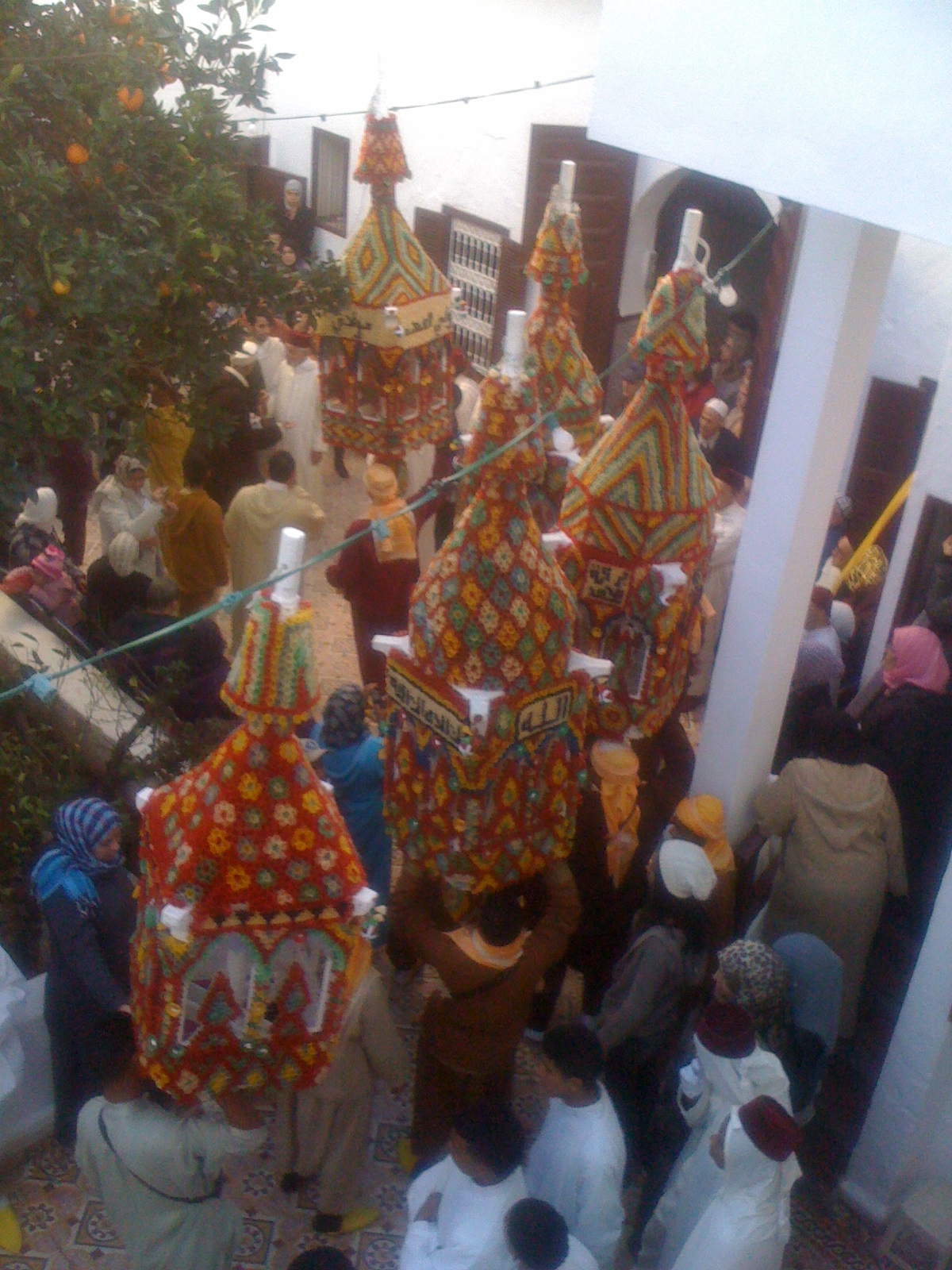
Convoy of candles

The Candles Convoy of Salé, also called Moussem of Candles or wax procession, is a festival in Salé, Morocco. It is held annually during the period of Mawlid (commemorating the birth of Muhammad).

== History ==
Ahmed al-Mansour was impressed by a convoy of candles in celebration of Mawlid during his exile (between 1557 à 1576) in Istanbul. He decided to imitate this Ottoman celebration in Marrakech. He ordered candle convoys in all parts of the kingdom including Salé. This tradition continued around Salé for many centuries.

Moroccans parade carrying large, colorful candles, which they then place at the foot of the mausoleum Sidi Abdellah ben Hassoun.

== See also ==
- Culture of Morocco
- List of festivals in Morocco
