= Imam Fassi =

Muhammad ibn Muhammad ibn Mas'ud al-Fasi (commonly known as Qutbul Ujud Imam Fassi) (Arabic: محمد بن محمد بن مسعود بن عبد الرحمن الفاسي, Muhammad ibn Muhammad ibn Mas'ūd ibn 'Abd al-Rahmān al-Fāsī; 1760?–1863) was the originator of the Fassi family of Sheikhs who constitute the Fassiyatush Shadhiliyya Sufi order.

== Early life ==
Al-Fasi was born either in the year 1173 Hijri (ca 1760 CE) or 1218 Hijri in Fes in Morocco, from which the family name "al-Fassi" had earlier been derived. His mother died during his very childhood. He was a hafiz of the Quran during his childhood and travelled to various parts of the world and finally Mecca in search of wisdom.

== Names ==
His full name is Abu Abdullah Muhammad bin Muhammad ibn Mas'ūd ibn Abd al-Rahmān al-Makkī al-Hasanī al-Idrisī al-Fāsī al-Shadhilī, or sometimes written and referenced as Hazrat Qutbul Ujud Seyyidina Mohammad al-Fassy ash-Shadhili. Within the tariqa, Muhammad al-Fasi, or Imam Fassi is widely referred to as Qutbul Ujud (Arabic: قطب الوجود, Quṭb al-Wujūd) or Qutbul Ujud Hazrat Fassi (Arabic: قطب الوجود حضرة فاسي, Quṭb al-Wujūd Haḍraẗ Fāsī) due to his lofty status in the diwān of saints. He is also sometimes referred to as Sidi Muhammad al-Fasi. His other titles include Qutbur Rabbani and Haikalus Samadhani.

== Education ==
Muhammad al-Fasi travelled to Mecca to memorise and learn the Quran with tajwid. He travelled to many places in search of good preachers. His main sheikh was Sidi al-Sheikh Muhammad ibn Hamza Zafir al-Madani (also written as Sheikh Qutb Mohammad bin Hamza lafir al-Madani).

== Shadhili Order Branch ==
Muhammad al-Fasi and his descendants form a branch of the Shadhili known as the Fāsiyya al-Shadhiliyya or Fassiyatush Shadhiliyya, often remarked as the Ṭarīq al-Shukr ("Order of Gratitude").

== The Spiritual Chain ==
The silsila of the Fassiyatush Shadhiliyya order (remarked as the Silsilat al-Dhahab, "the Golden Chain") is as follows:

- Allah
- Jibra'il
- Muhammad
- Ali ibn Abi Talib
- Imam Hasan
- Abu Muhammad Jaabir
- Sa'īd Al-Ghazwānī
- Abu Muhammad Fath as-Su'ūd
- Abu Muhammad Sa'ad
- Abi Muhammad Sa'īd
- Abu 'l-Qāsim bin Marwān
- Ishaq Ibrahim al-Basarī
- Zainuddin al-Qazwīnī
- Sayyidi Shamsuddin
- Sayyidi Tājuddin
- Sayyidi Nūruddin
- Sayyidi Fakhruddin
- Taqi'uddin al-Fukhayr
- Abd al-Rahman al-Madani al-Attar al-Zayyat
- Abd as-Salam ibn Mashīsh al-'Alami
- Imam Nūruddin Abu 'l-Hasan 'Alī ash-Shādhilī
- Abu 'l-'Abbās al-Mursī
- Ahmad ibn Ata’ullah al-Iskandarī
- Dāwūd al-Bakhilī
- Muhammad Wafa
- 'Alī Wafa
- Yahya al-Qadirī
- Ahmad ibn 'Uqba al-Haḍramī
- Sheikh Shihābuddin Abu 'l-'Abbas Ahmad Zarrūq al-Fāsī
- Ibrahim Ithām
- 'Alī Sanhānī
- Abd al-Rahman al-Majdhubi (Majzoubi)
- Abu 'l-Mahāsin Yūsuf al-Fāsi
- Sidi Muhammad
- Abd al-Rahman al-Fasi
- Qāsim al-Ikhlāṣī
- Ahmad ibn Abdullah al-Fāsī
- 'Arabī ibn Ahmad ibn 'Abdullah Ṣāhib al-Maqfiyya
- 'Alī al-Jamal al-'Imranī
- Muhammad al-'Arabi ibn Ahmad al-Darqawī
- Muhammad ibn Hamza Ẓāfir al-Madanī
- Sidi Muhammad ibn Muhammad ibn Mas'ud ibn Abd al-Rahman al-Makkī al-Idrīsī al-Fāsī al-Shādhilī (Muhammad al-Fāsī, Imam Fassi)
- Shamsuddin Makkī ibn Muhammad al-Fāsī
- Ahmad al-Arabi
- Muhammad Ibraheem Fassi ibn Shamsuddin Makki al Fassi
- Abdullah al-Fāsī ibn Shamsuddin Makkī al-Fāsī
- Dr. Muhammad ibn Mohammad Ibrahim al Fassi
- Abdul Wahab al Fassi ibn Mohammed Ibrahim al Fassi ash Shadhili
- Abdul Qadir al Fassi ibn Muhammad Ibrahim al Fassi ash Shadhili
- Najmul Ulema Hazrat Ajwad ibn Abdallah al Fassi ash Shadhili
- Mahdhi Al Fassi ibn Abdallah al Fassi ash Shadhili (Present day Sheikh al-Sujjada of World Fassiyatush Shadhiliyya Sufi order)
