= Oulad Ouchih =

Oulad Ouchih أولاد أوشيح
- Rural commune and town
- Location within Morocco Location within Africa
- Coordinates: 35.0939°N 5.9454°W
- Country: Morocco
- Region: Tanger-Tetouan-Al Hoceima
- Province: Larache

Population (2004)
  - Total: 22,426
- Time zone: UTC+0 (GMT)

Oulad Ouchih is a small town and rural commune in Larache Province of the Tanger-Tetouan-Al Hoceima region of Morocco. At the time of the 2004 census, the commune had a total population of 22,426 people living in 3,851 households.
