= Souaken =

Coordinates: 35°07′N 5°57′W

- Rural commune and town
- Interactive map of Souaken
- Country: Morocco
- Region: Tanger-Tetouan-Al Hoceima
- Province: Larache

Population (2004)
  - Total: 12,362
- Time zone: UTC+0 (GMT)

Souaken is a small town and rural commune in Larache Province of the Tanger-Tetouan-Al Hoceima region of Morocco. At the time of the 2004 census, the commune had a total population of 12,362 people living in 1841 households.
