= Bou Jedyane =

- Rural commune and town
- Location within Morocco Location within Africa
- Coordinates: 35.1114°N 5.7823°W
- Country: Morocco
- Region: Tanger-Tetouan-Al Hoceima
- Province: Larache

Population (2004)
  - Total: 12,161
- Time zone: UTC+0 (GMT)

Bou Jedyane is a small town and rural commune in Larache Province of the Tanger-Tetouan-Al Hoceima region of Morocco. At the time of the 2004 census, the commune had a total population of 12,161 people living in 2378 households.
