= Mausoleum of Abu al-Hasan al-Shadhili =

Sufi Islamic mosque, mausoleum and library in Egypt

- ضريح أبي الحسن الشاذلي
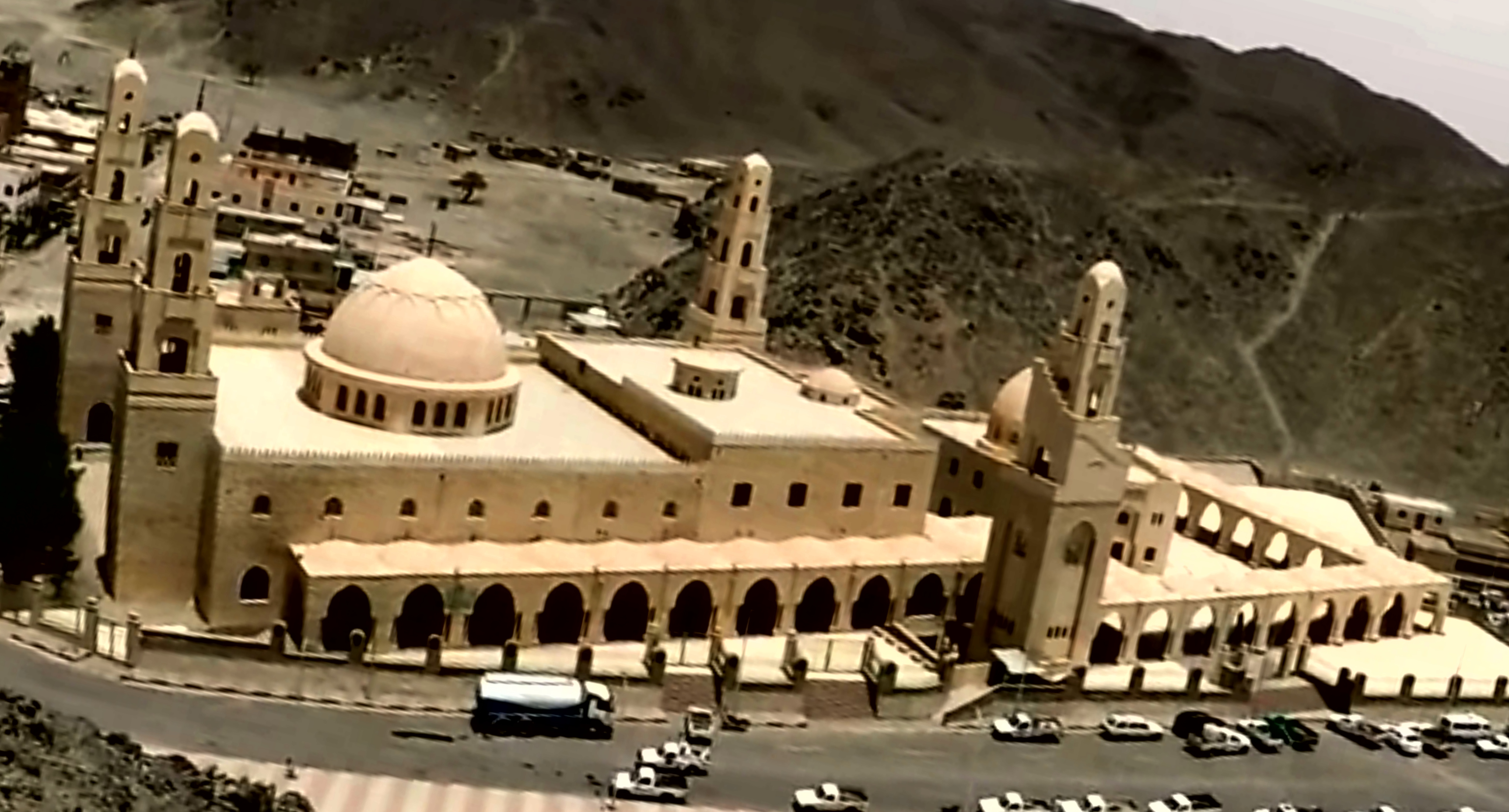

- Location in Egypt

Religion
- Affiliation: Sunni Islam
- Sect: Sufism: Shadhili
- Ecclesiastical or organizational status: Mosque and shrine
- Status: Active

Location
- Location: Humaithara, Red Sea Governorate
- Country: Egypt
- Interactive map of Mausoleum of Abu al-Hasan al-Shadhili
- Coordinates: 24°12′2.5″N 34°8′8.2″E

Architecture
- Type: Islamic architecture
- Established: 13th century (mausoleum); 21st century (mosque)

Specifications
- Dome: One
- Minaret: Four
- Shrine: One: Abu al-Hasan al-Shadhili

The Mausoleum of Abu al-Hasan al-Shadhili, also known as the Dargah of Qutbul Akbar Imam Shadhili (Arabic: ضريح أبي الحسن الشاذلي) is an Sufi mosque and mausoleum (dargah) complex located in Humaithara, Red Sea Governorate, Egypt. The complex is dedicated to Abu al-Hasan al-Shadhili (died 1258), the founder of the Shadhili Sufi order.

== History ==
The religious complex was built in Humaithara. After the death of Abu al-Hasan al-Shadhili, the area was renamed Sheikh Shazly due to the presence of his grave there. The mausoleum was expanded after the late 13th century to accommodate the large numbers of pilgrims visiting the tomb. In the 21st century, the Ministry of Endowments established a mosque and connected it to the entrance to the mausoleum. Sanitation facilities were attached to the mosque building as well. A madrasah for memorizing the Qur'an was also established, as well as a temporary housing for the Sheikh of the mosque and the madrasah's teacher.

=== The well of Humaithara ===
Outside the religious complex, there is a well, which local traditions relate that some water gargled by Al-Shadhili himself was poured into it on a day prior to his death. The water of this well is generally safe for consumption, and it is also a source of fresh water for the surrounding villages.

== See also ==
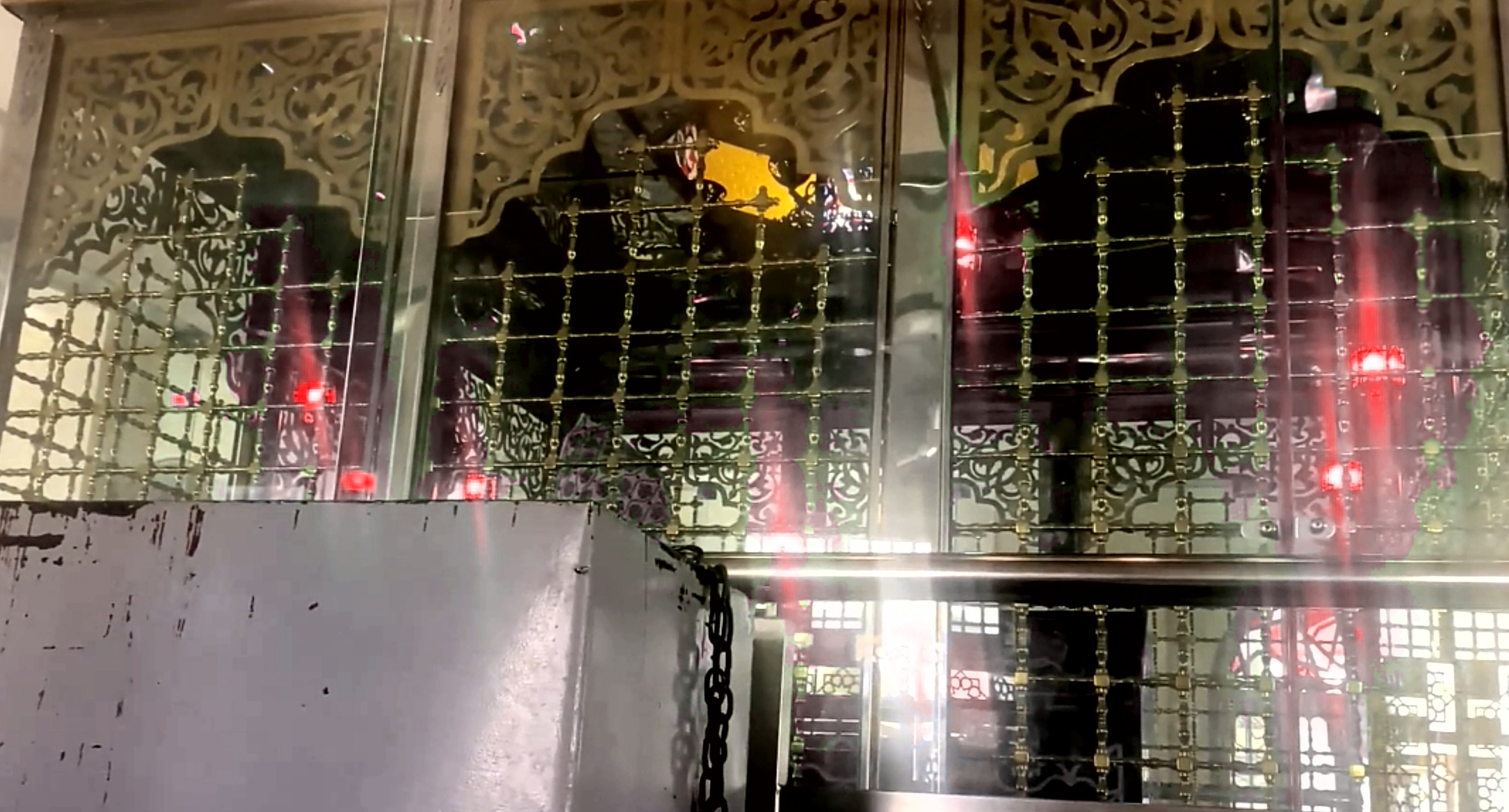
The tomb of Abu'l Hasan Shadhili

- Islam in Egypt
- List of mosques in Egypt
