= Khemis Sahel =

Coordinates: 35°15′N 6°05′W

- Town
- Interactive map of Khemis Sahel
- Country: Morocco
- Region: Tanger-Tetouan-Al Hoceima
- Province: Larache

Population (2004)
  - Total: 4,826
- Time zone: UTC+0 (GMT)

Khemis Sahel is a town in Larache Province, Tanger-Tetouan-Al Hoceima, Morocco. According to the 2004 census it has a population of 4,826.
