= Zouada =

- Rural commune and town
- Location within Morocco Location within Africa
- Coordinates: 35.05458°N 6.02240°W
- Country: Morocco
- Region: Tanger-Tetouan-Al Hoceima
- Province: Larache

Population (2004)
  - Total: 20,930
- Time zone: UTC+0 (GMT)

Zouada is a small town and rural commune in Larache Province of the Tanger-Tetouan-Al Hoceima region of Morocco. At the time of the 2004 census, the commune had a total population of 20,930 people living in 3100 households.
