= Bni Garfett =

Coordinates: 35°15′N 5°50′W

Souk Sebt Beni-Garfett
- Rural commune and town
- Interactive map of Souk Sebt Beni-Garfett
- Country: Morocco
- Region: Tanger-Tetouan-Al Hoceima
- Province: Larache

Population (2004)
  - Total: 16,393
- Time zone: UTC+0 (GMT)

Beni Garfett is a small town and rural commune in Larache Province of the Tanger-Tetouan-Al Hoceima region of Morocco. At the time of the 2004 census, the commune had a total population of 16,393 people living in 2963 households.
