= Sahel, Larache =

Coordinates: 34°58′N 4°33′W

Sahel
- Rural commune and town
- Interactive map of Sahel
- Country: Morocco
- Region: Tanger-Tetouan-Al Hoceima
- Province: Larache

Population (2004)
  - Total: 15,785
- Time zone: UTC+0 (GMT)

Sahel is a small town and rural commune in Larache Province of the Tanger-Tetouan-Al Hoceima region of Morocco. At the time of the 2004 census, the commune had a total population of 15785 people living in 2949 households.
