= Abu Said al-Baji =

Muslim saint in Tunisia (1156–1231)

Sidi Abu Said al-Baji أبو سعيد الباجي

Personal life
- Born: 1156 Béja
- Died: 1231 (aged 74–75) Sidi Bou Said

Religious life
- Religion: Islam
- Denomination: Sunni

Muslim leader
- Influenced by: Abu Madyan, Ibn Arabi
- Influenced: Abul Hasan ash-Shadhili, Aisha Al-Manoubya

Abu Said ibn Khalef ibn Yahia Al-Tamimi Al-Baji, commonly known as Sidi Bou Said (Arabic: سيدي أبو سعيد الباجي; 1156–1231), was an Arab Sufi scholar (wali). A disciple of Abu Madyan, he is mostly remembered for being Abul Hasan ash-Shadhili's teacher during his stay in Tunisia. He likely met with the Andalusian philosopher Ibn Arabi during his pilgrimage and few-years stay in Damascus and Mecca.

In January 2013, a fire of criminal origin was set to his shrine. This came only a few days after threats from some Salafists who were demanding that access to the shrine be banned, as it is considered as an idolatry practice to visit tombs and to worship them in Islam.

The district of Sidi Bou Said in Tunis is named after him.
