= Larache Province =

Coordinates: 35.1833°N 6.1500°W

Larache Province إقليم العرائش ⵜⴰⵙⴳⴰ ⵏ ⵍⵄⵔⴰⵢⵛ
- Province
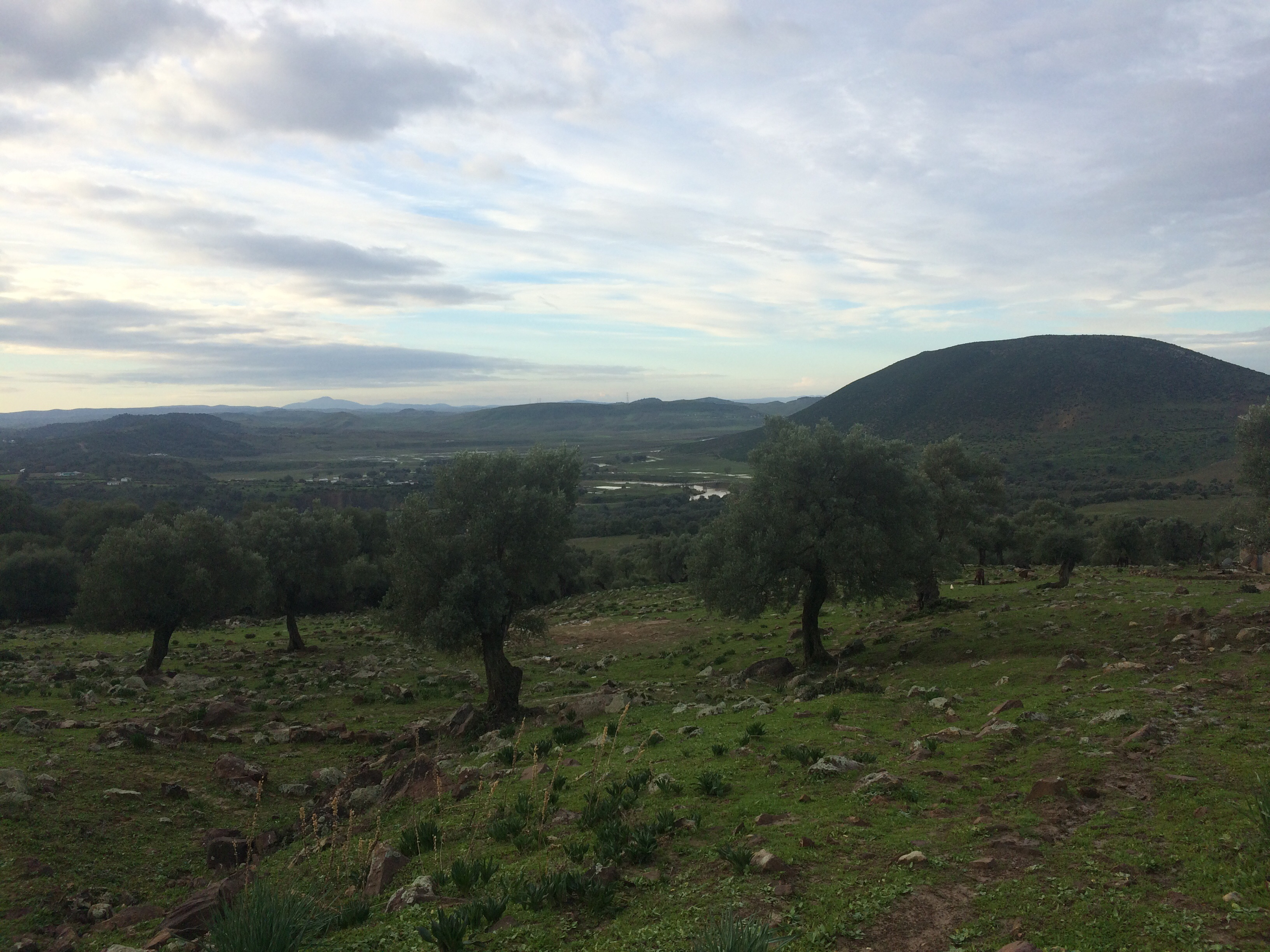
- Interactive map of Larache Province
- Country: Morocco
- Region: Tanger-Tetouan-Al Hoceima
- Seat: Larache

Area
  - Total: 2,684 km^{2} (1,036 sq mi)

Population (2024)
  - Total: 510,211

Larache Province (Arabic: إقليم العرائش; Standard Moroccan Tamazight: ⵜⴰⵙⴳⴰ ⵏ ⵍⵄⵔⴰⵢⵛ) is a province in the Tanger-Tetouan-Al Hoceima region of Morocco. Its capital is Larache. According to the 2024 census, it had a population of 510,211.

The major cities are:

- Larache
- Ksar el Kebir

== History ==
The territory of present-day Larache Province has a long history linked to its strategic position on the Atlantic coast of northern Morocco. The region experienced various occupations during antiquity and the Islamic period, notably around the archaeological site of Lixus.

== Geography ==
Larache Province is located in northwestern Morocco, along the Atlantic coast. It is bordered:

- to the north by the Tangier-Assilah Prefecture;
- to the east by Chefchaouen Province and Ouezzane Province;
- to the south by Sidi Kacem Province;
- to the west by the Atlantic Ocean.

The province includes two main geographical areas:

- a mountainous zone in the north and east (Beni Arous, Aaroura, Tazrout), part of the western Rif;
- a broad plain in the south, corresponding to the extension of the Gharb plain (Ksar el-Kebir, Larache, Zouada, Laouamra), which is favorable to agriculture.

The climate is Mediterranean with oceanic influence, characterized by mild, wet winters and moderate summers.

== Administrative divisions ==
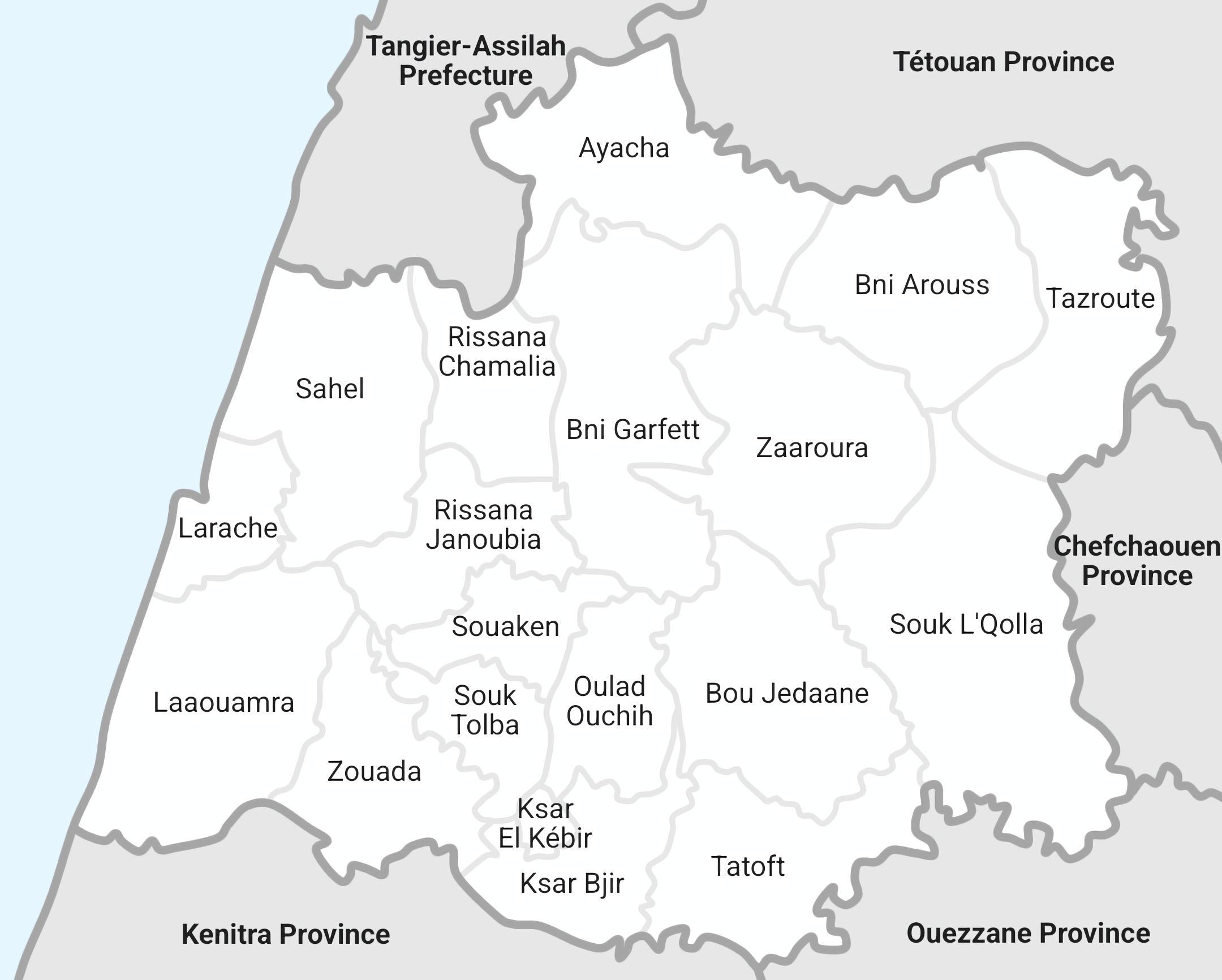
Communes of Al Larache Province

The province is composed of several urban and rural communes. It notably includes the municipalities of Larache and Ksar el Kebir, along with a number of rural communes distributed across its territory.

=== Subdivisions ===
The province is divided administratively into the following:

Name	Geographic code	Type	Households	Population (2004)	Foreign population	Moroccan population	Notes
Ksar El Kebir	331.01.01.	Municipality	22532	107380	34	107346	
Larache	331.01.03.	Municipality	23399	107371	131	107240	
Bou Jedyane	331.03.01.	Rural commune	2378	12161	0	12161	
Ksar Bjir	331.03.03.	Rural commune	2583	14876	0	14876	
Laouamra	331.03.05.	Rural commune	5205	35161	3	35158	
Oulad Ouchih	331.03.07.	Rural commune	3851	22426	1	22425	
Souaken	331.03.09.	Rural commune	1841	12362	0	12362	
Souk L'Qolla	331.03.11.	Rural commune	2933	16903	0	16903	
Souk Tolba	331.03.13.	Rural commune	2137	13142	0	13142	
Tatoft	331.03.15.	Rural commune	2229	11005	0	11005	
Zouada	331.03.17.	Rural commune	3100	20930	0	20930	
Ayacha	331.05.01.	Rural commune	1563	8678	0	8678	
Bni Arouss	331.05.03.	Rural commune	2019	10288	0	10288	
Bni Garfett	331.05.05.	Rural commune	2963	16393	0	16393	
Rissana Chamalia	331.05.07.	Rural commune	2045	12266	0	12266	
Rissana Janoubia	331.05.09.	Rural commune	2592	15890	0	15890	
Sahel	331.05.11.	Rural commune	2949	15785	0	15785	4826 residents live in the center, called Khemis Sahel; 10959 residents live in rural areas.
Tazroute	331.05.13.	Rural commune	1166	6438	0	6438	
Zaaroura	331.05.15.	Rural commune	2459	12931	0	12931	
