= Abd al-Salam ibn Mashish =

Moroccan Sufi saint

Mulay Quṭb al-Maghrib al-Aqṣa Abd as-Salam ibn Mashish al-Alami عبد السلام إبن مشيش العلمي
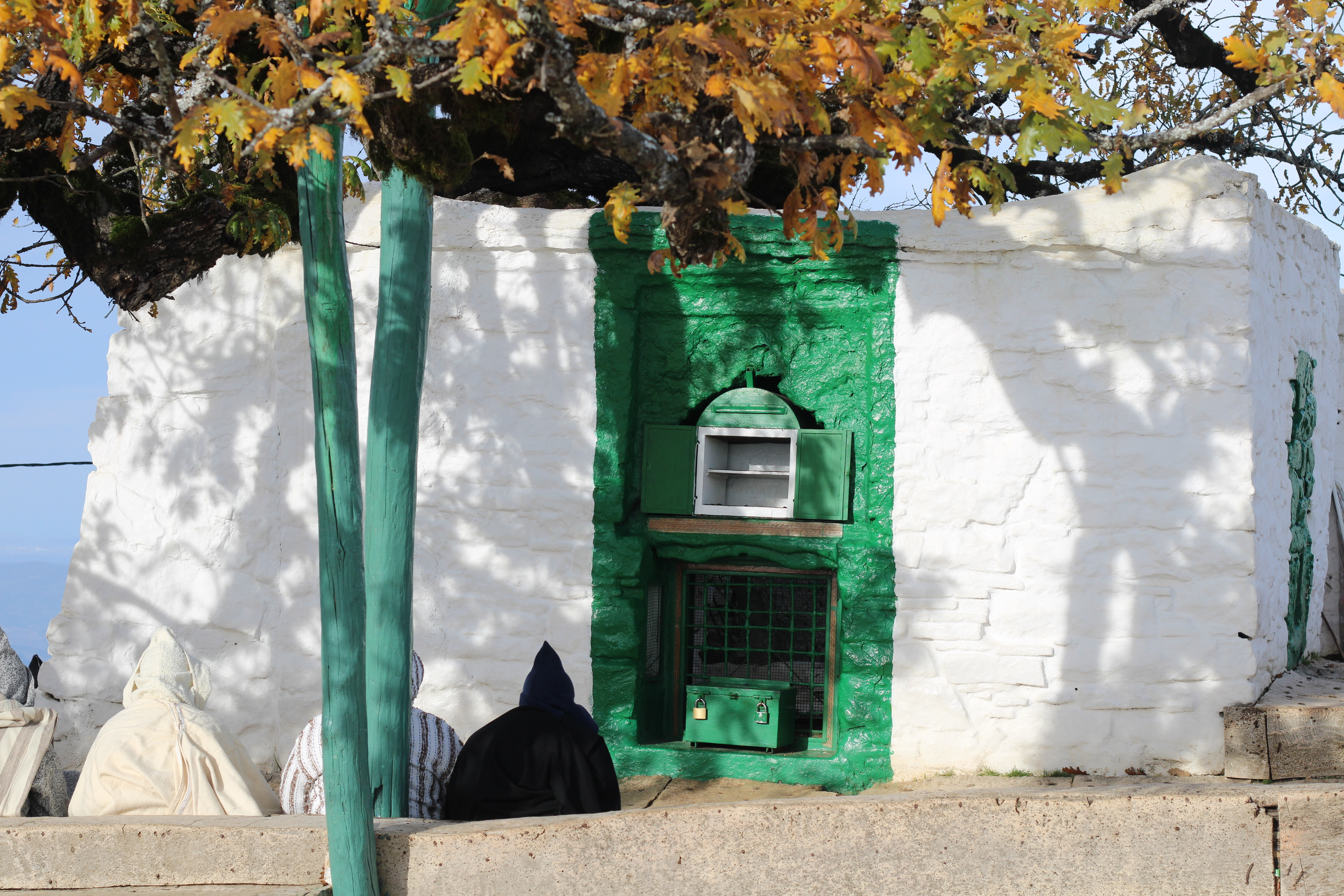

Personal life
- Born: Bni Arouss, neighbourhood of Jabal al-ʻAlam
- Died: 1227 Jabal Alam, South of Tétouan.
- Resting place: Shrine of Moulay Abdeslam, south of Tétouan.

Religious life
- Religion: Islam
- Denomination: Sunni
- Jurisprudence: Maliki

Muslim leader
- Disciple of: Abu Madyan
- Influenced by: Abu Madyan, Ibn Arabi
- Influenced: Abul Hasan ash-Shadhili

ʻAbd al-Salām ibn Mashīsh al-ʻAlamī (Arabic: عبد السلام بن مشيش العلمي; b. ?–1227) was a Sufi saint who lived during the reign of the Almohad Caliphate in northwestern Morocco.

== Biography ==
Virtually nothing is known about him except that he was assassinated in 1227/1228 by the anti-Almohad rebel ibn Abi Tawajin.

His genealogy was traced through several ancestors—some of them with typically Berber names (from his maternal lineage while his paternal lineage was solely Arab)—all the way to the Prophet of Islam, Muhammad. It is said that he was born to the Beni Arouss tribe in the neighbourhood of the Jabal al-'Alam, and that at the age of 16 he travelled to the east to study. On his return, in Béjaïa, he followed the instructions of the Andalusian Sufi mystic Abu Madyan. He came back to stay in his native country, where he withdrew to the mountains near Fnideq to live an edifying life as a Sufi ascetic. He was the murshid (spiritual guide) of Al-Shadhili, and his only disciple.

== Notes ==
- Muhammad Bennani, Mulay Abd Es Selam El Machich, ed. by África Española – Madrid, 1913 (In Spanish)
- Titus Burckhardt, "The Prayer of Ibn Mashish", Studies in Comparative Religion, Winter-Spring, 1978, Pates Manor, Bedfont, Middlesex
- Titus Burckhardt, "The Prayer of Ibn Mashish (As-Salat al-Mashishiyah)", Translation and commentary, Islamic Quarterly, London, 1978, vol. 20-21-22, no3, pp. 68–75
