= Ayacha =

Coordinates: 35.3830°N 5.8333°W

- Rural commune and town
- Interactive map of Ayacha
- Country: Morocco
- Region: Tanger-Tetouan-Al Hoceima
- Province: Larache
- Elevation: 80 m (260 ft)

Population (2004)
  - Total: 8,678
- Time zone: UTC+0 (GMT)

Ayacha is a small town and rural commune in Larache Province of the Tanger-Tetouan-Al Hoceima region of Morocco. At the time of the 2004 census, the commune had a total population of 8678 people living in 1563 households.
