= Squatting in Tunisia =

Tunisia on globe

Squatting in Tunisia is the occupation of derelict land or unused buildings without the permission of the owner. Informal settlements known as "gourbivilles" sprang up in the French protectorate of Tunisia in the 1930s and again after World War II. As French colonialists introduced the concept of private property to nomadic tribes, lawyers such as Habib Bourguiba (later President of Tunisia) represented the rights of squatters. By the time Tunisia became an independent republic in 1956, the capital Tunis was ringed by gourbivilles. The response of the authorities was to evict and forcibly resettle.

From the 1960s onwards, areas of land on the periphery of cities were either bought or squatted, and the new inhabitants built housing for themselves, sometimes creating new suburbs with bad infrastructure. By 1980, the country had 210 informal settlements housing around 500,000 people (28 per cent of the population of urban zones). The Urban Rehabilitation and Renovation Agency (Agence de Réhabilitation et de Rénovation Urbaine, ARRU) was set up in 1981 to follow a slum upgrading program and by 2009 it had helped to redevelop 36 settlements. It runs the National Programme for Rehabilitating Popular Neighbourhoods (Programme national de réhabilitation des quartiers populaires, PNRQP). The Dar El Bay palace in Hammam-Lif has been occupied from the 1980s onwards. Following the Tunisian Revolution began the Arab Spring in 2011, President Ben Ali was deposed and in the disorder many people occupied public land. The Ministry of the Interior warned the squatters that they were still acting illegally.
