= Al-Shadhili =

Founder of the Shadhili Sufi order

Sidi Abul-Hasan ash-Shadhili ابو الحسن الشاذلي
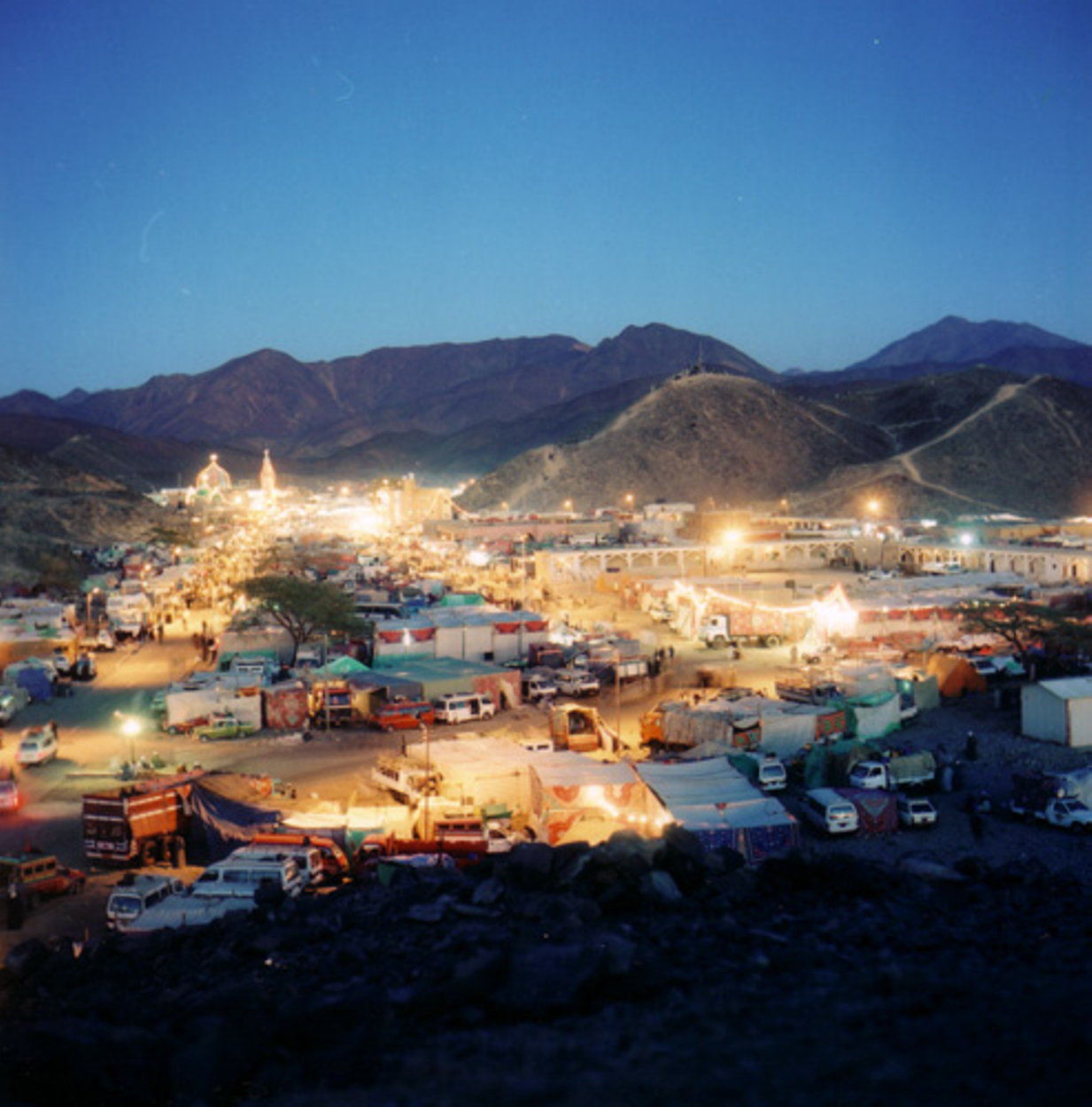
- Mausoleum of Imam ash-Shadhili in Humaithara (in the background)
- Title: Nour ad-Addin نور الدين

Personal life
- Born: 1196 Near Tangiers, Morocco
- Died: 1258 (aged 61–62) Humaithara, Egypt
- Resting place: Mausoleum of Imam ash-Shadhili

Religious life
- Religion: Islam
- Denomination: Sunni
- Jurisprudence: Maliki
- Tariqa: Tariqa ash-Shadhiliya

Muslim leader
- Disciple of: Abd as-Salam ibn Mashish al-Alami, Abu Said al-Baji
- Influenced by: Abd as-Salam ibn Mashish al-Alami
- Influenced: Abu al-Abbas al-Mursi Ibn Ata Allah Busiri Imam al-Jazuli al-Darqawi Imam al-Fassi

Abu al-Hasan al-Shadhili (Arabic: أبو الحسن الشاذلي) (full name: Abū al-Ḥasan ʿAlī ibn ʿAbd Allāh ibn ʿAbd al-Jabbār al-Ḥasanī wal-Ḥusaynī al-Shādhilī) also known as Sheikh al-Shadhili (593–656 AH) (1196–1258 AD) was an influential Moroccan Islamic scholar and Sufi, founder of the Shadhili Sufi order.

== Early life ==
Al-Shadhili was born near Tetouan in 1196. He was a Sharif who was patrilineally descendant of the Arab Hashim tribe via the Idrisids, and matrilineally born to a royal family of the Berber Ghomara tribe. He was a Maliki in jurisprudence and wandered far afield in search of knowledge. Immensely learned, even as a young man, he was famous for his ability to engage in legal argumentation with the religions scholars of his day. As a young man, Abulhasan was hesitating between living the life of an ascetic in the wilderness in order to give himself up totally to worship and invocation, or to return to the towns and settlements to be in the company of the scholars and the righteous. He studied in Fes and moved to Alexandria in 1244.

In Iraq he met the Sufi master al-Wasiti, who advised him to find his Spiritual Master (Sheikh) in the country Abulhasan had travelled from, there he later met Abd as-Salam ibn Mashish, the great Moroccan spiritual master. Under his guidance, Abulhasan attained enlightenment and proceeded to spread his knowledge across Maghreb, especially in Tunisia and Egypt, where he is buried. He founded his first zawiya in Tunis in 1227. He died in 1258 in Humaithra, Egypt, en route to Mecca.

== Finding his sheikh ==
It was in a hermitage on top of Jabal al-'Alam, near Tétouan, that he met the sheikh who he was searching for and who was to have the greatest influence on his life, Abd as-Salam ibn Mashish (d. 625/1228), known as "the Pole of the West", just as Abd al-Qadir Gilani (d. 561/1166) was called "the Pole of the East". While he was living with Sheikh Ibn Mashish, on the holy mountain, many wonderful signs from Allah came to Abu'l Hasan, through this holy guide. One such sign was that on the night of his arrival on the mountain he was sleeping at the entrance of the cave where his master lived. He dreamt that he was asking the Sheikh to grant him certain wishes, one of them being that Allah would incline the hearts of His creatures in favour towards him. Then he wished to ask his master if it was necessary for him to live in solitude, or in the desert, in order for him to be in the right station (maqām) to perform his religious tasks, or whether he should return to the towns and inhabited places to seek out the company of scholars and virtuous people. While he was turning these things in his heart he heard the Sheikh praying fervently and calling out:

O God, there are people who ask You to give them power over your creatures, and You give them that. But I, O God, beg You to turn Your creatures from me so that I may have no refuge except in You.

The next morning, when he greeted his teacher to be, he asked him of his state (kayf al-hal), to which Ibn Mashish responded, "I complain unto God about the coolness of contentment and submission (bard al-rida wa al-taslim) just as you complain unto Him about the heat of self-direction and choice (harr al-tadbir wa al-ikhtiyar)." When he saw the astonishment on his student's face at hearing his words, he added, "Because I fear that the sweetness of such an existence would make me neglectful of my duty towards Allah." Then Abu'l Hasan said, "This is the Pole of Islam. This is the Sea which overflows." He knew then that his master had taken hold of his whole heart, and he was thereby completely illumined.

Four fundamental themes ran through Abd as-Salam teaching of to Abu'l Hasan, as perceived from his famous Hizb, called as-Salat al-Mashishiya:

1. the Oneness of Existence (wahdat al-wujud) which he said could be realised only through asceticism,
2. fear of God and His judgements (khawfu billah),
3. the belief that God is everywhere and that it is necessary to see His Face in everything that He has created,
4. that only through the drowning in the Ocean of the Unity (awnu fi bahri al-wahadati) can the seeker cast off and leave behind his own existence and attributes to be merged and absorbed into Allah and His Attributes.

Before his departure from Jabal al-Alam, Abd as-Salam foretold his student of his eventual move to Ifriqiya where he will become known by the name of Shadhili and the eminent spiritual station he will eventually inherit from Abd as-Salam himself. Abu'l Hasan relates that in a dream, he saw his master standing near the Divine Throne. When he told him of this dream in the morning, Abd as-Salam replied, "O Ali, it was not me you saw, it was the station you will inherit from me."

O Ali, God is God, and men are men. When you are among the people, keep your tongue from mentioning the Sirr (secret) and your heart from imitating their ways. Be assiduous in the fulfilment of the mandatory practices of the religion and protect your bodily members from forbidden things. In you the role of sainthood will have reached fruition. Only admonish others to the degree that is obligatory upon you. And say, "O God, give me repose from their mention [of me] and from any obstacles arising from them. Deliver me from their evil. Let Your bounty suffice me from [having to seek] their bounty, and protect me among them by Your special grace. Verily, You have power over all things... O Ali, flee from men's benevolence more than you flee from their malevolence. Because their benevolence will afflict your heart, while their evil will only afflict your body, and it is better that the body be afflicted than the heart.

The parting words of advice and admonition that Abd as-Salam gave his disciple before he departed for Tunis emphasised the transformation of consciousness to inward and outward God-centeredness, contentment with God in all states, and the inner withdrawal from creation in prosperity and adversity. These seminal teachings of Abd as-Salam would, through Abu'l Hasan, become the fundamental precepts of the Shadhili Tariqa.

== Travels ==
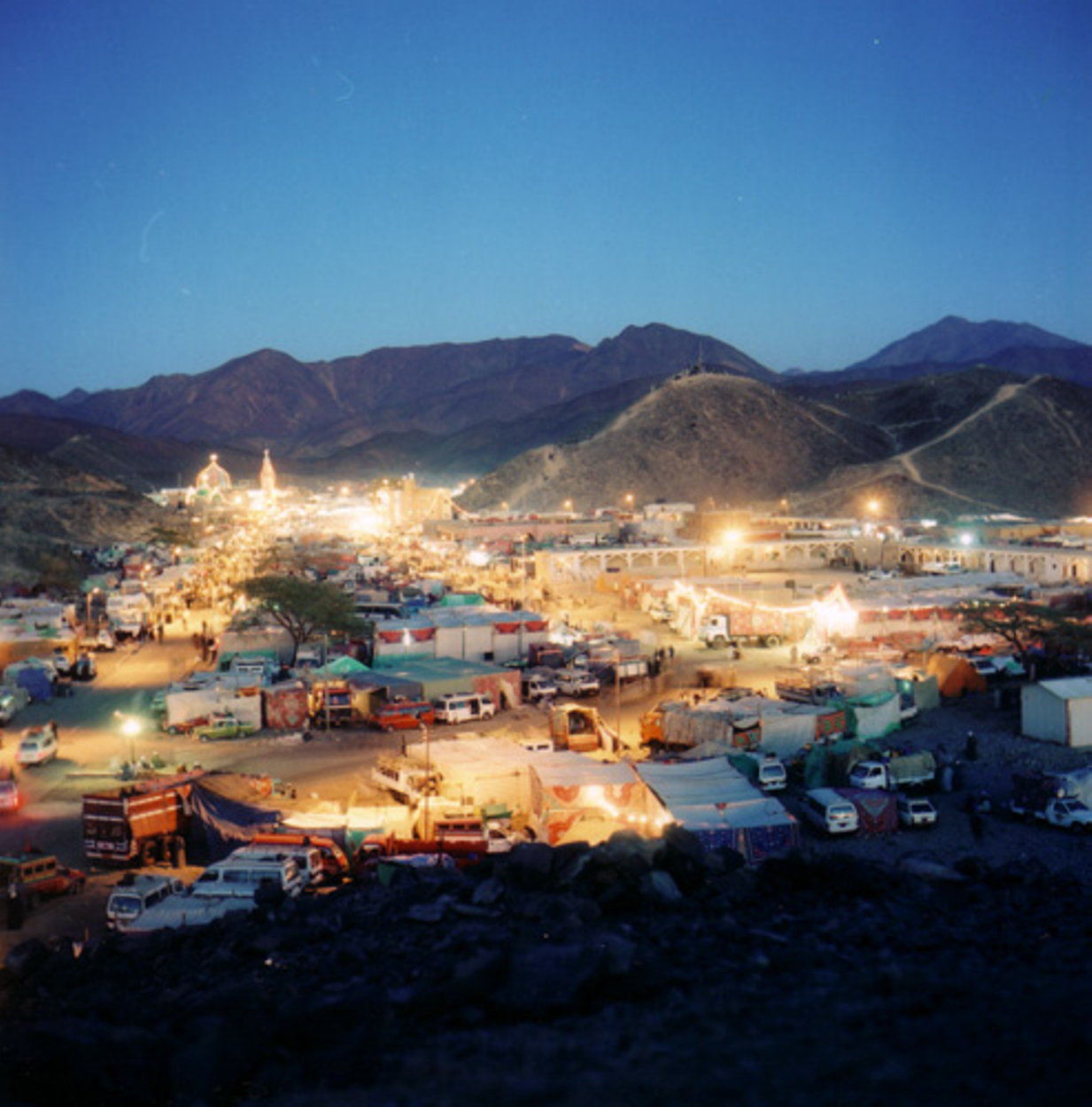
The Holy Dargah of Imam Shadhili, Humaithara, Egypt

=== Tunis ===
Remaining with his master for a while, Abu'l Hasan then departed for Shadhila, in Tunisia, on orders from his teacher; and from there he received the name of al-Shadhili. He entered a new retreat in a cave on top of Jabal Zaghwan close to Shadhila accompanied by his first companion Abu Yahya Abdellah ibn Samala al-Habibi. After intense spiritual exercises in the Jabal Zaghwan region, he was ordered in a vision to teach Sufism.

Accordingly, he set up his first institution (zawiyah) in Tunis in the year 625/1228, just when the new governor, Abu Zakariyya', also arrived. During his early years in Tunis, Abu'l Hasan first taught forty students who were known as the forty friends (al-awliya al-arba'un). His new tariqah was a stunning success, drawing masses of people from all walks of life, including the sultan's family.

On one of his trips to the East, an Ayyubid sultan conferred on him and his descendants, by way of a religious endowment, one of the enormous towers that arose from the walls formerly encompassing the city of Alexandria in Egypt.

Abu'l Hasan remained in Tunis for a number of years until one day God Most High brought him a young man who was to become his successor and the inheritor of his station and his holy line, Abul Abbas al-Mursi (d. 686/1271), from Murcia in Spain.

=== Egypt ===
In the year 642/1244, the sheikh, once again had a vision. Abu'l Hasan said:

I saw the Prophet in a dream and he said to me, "O Ali, go to Egypt and raise the ranks of forty true followers (siddiqun) there." It was the summer time and intensely hot and I said, "O Prophet of God, the heat is very great." He said, "Lo, the clouds will give you shade." I said, "I fear thirst." He replied, "Look, the sky will rain for you every day." He promised me many miraculous gifts (karamat) on my journey. So I instructed my followers to prepare to depart for Egypt.

Thus he left Tunisia accompanied by Al-Mursi Abu'l-'Abbas, his brother Abdullah, his servant Abu al-'Azayim as well as other Sufi sheikhs and many of his own disciples, and moved to Alexandria, where he established both his residence and the institution (zawiyah) of his order in the tower the sultan had given him. Alexandria was, during this time, a distinguished city and a place of learning various major sciences.

He lived with his family on the top floor; another floor was converted into a tremendous mosque where he gave public instruction; and another floor was converted into a great zawiyah for his disciples, with cells for meditational retreat. In Egypt, likewise, his order was greatly successful, drawing into its ranks many court officials, great religious scholars like Izz al-Din ibn 'Abd al-Salam (d. 660/1262) or the Shafi 'i traditionist al-Mundhiri (d. 656/1258), a host of Sufi figures, and individuals from different levels of society. In the year 646/1248, he lost His vision, and it was in that state that he participated in the Battle of Al Mansurah in Egypt, which stopped the Seventh Crusade headed by Saint Louis of France.

== Death ==
Shortly before Sheikh Abu'l Hasan started on his last pilgrimage to Mecca, the city of Baghdad fell to the conquering Mongols, thus ending the long reign of the Abbasids there and ushering in a new epoch in the history of Islam. The sheikh was accompanied by a mass of his disciples; but he fell ill in the eastern desert of Egypt, in Humaithara, and there he died in the year 656/1258. He was buried there, and a mosque and mausoleum complex was built for him.

== Successors ==
Shortly before he died, in 656/1258, Sheikh Abu'l Hasan designated Abu'l Abbas al-Mursi as his successor in the order. After Sheikh Abu'l Hasan's death, Abu'l Abbas al-Mursi moved into the great tower that the founder of the Shadhiliyyah had used as residence, mosque, and zawiyah, and remained there until his death ( 686/1288) some thirty years later, seldom moving out to travel in Egypt.

== Ideas ==
When asked who his spiritual master was, he used to reply, "I used to be the close follower of Abd as-Salam ibn Mashish, but still I am drinking the water of wisdom from five ponds Jibril, Mikhail, Israfil, Izra'il, Rooh." Shaykh Abul-Abbas al-Mursi (d. 1288), who succeeded Shaykh ash-Shadhili as the spiritual master of the Order, was asked about the knowledge of his spiritual master and replied, "He gave me forty sciences. He was an ocean without a shore." He taught his close followers to lead a life of contemplation and remembrance of Allah while performing the normal everyday activities of the world. He disliked initiating any would-be follower unless that person already had a profession. His admonition to his close followers was to apply the teachings of Islam in their own lives in the world and to transform their existence. Shadhili wrote several devotional recitations, prayers and letters, some of which remain today. One of the best known poems is his "Litany of the Sea" (hizb al-Bahr).

== Bibliography ==
- Origins of the School of the Shadhdhuliyya is published by its translator Shaykh Nooruddeen Durkee includes the life of Shaykh Abul Hasan ash-Shadhdhuli and his followers, 2012.
- The Mystical Teachings of al-Shadhili, including His Life, Prayers, Letters, and Followers.
- A Translation from the Arabic of Ibn al-Sabbagh's Durrat al-Asrar wa Tuhfat al-Abrar by Elmer H. Douglas, Edition, introduction, and notes by Ibrahim M. Abu-Rabi, SUNY series in Islam, 1993
- The Rise of al-Shadhili (d. 656/1258), by A. M. Mohamed Mackeen, in: Journal of the American Oriental Society, Vol. 91, No. 4 (Oct. – Dec., 1971), pp. 477–486

== See also ==
- Shadhili
- Imam Fassi
- Ibn Ata Allah
- al-Fassi family
- Moinuddin Chishti
- Ashraf Jahangir Semnani
