= Bni Arouss =

Bni Arouss بني عروس
- Rural commune and town
- Location within Morocco Location within Africa
- Coordinates: 35.3065°N 5.6291°W
- Country: Morocco
- Region: Tanger-Tetouan-Al Hoceima
- Province: Larache

Population (2014)
  - Total: 8,193
- Time zone: UTC+0 (GMT)

Bni Arouss is a rural area Village consisting of 18 Duars (DSHARS) situated on about 540 Square Kilometer of Land that was gifted to "SHORFA" "AHL MANZIL AL ILM" and rural commune in Larache Province of the Tanger-Tetouan-Al Hoceima region of Morocco. At the time of the 2004 census, the commune had a total population of 10,288 people living in 2019 households. Yet, as of 2014, this number has declined to 8193 only, with one foreigner and the rest Moroccans living there.
