= Tangier-Tétouan =

Tangier-Tétouan طنجة تطوان
- Region
- Location in Morocco
- Coordinates: 35°46′N 5°48′W
- Country: Morocco
- Created: 1997
- Abolished: September 2015
- Capital: Tangier

Area
  - Total: 11,570 km^{2} (4,470 sq mi)

Population (2014 census)
  - Total: 3,157,075
  - Density: 272.9/km^{2} (706.7/sq mi)
- Time zone: UTC+0 (WET)
  - Summer (DST): UTC+1 (WEST)

Tangier-Tétouan (Arabic: طنجة تطوان) was formerly one of the sixteen regions of Morocco from 1997 to 2015. It covered an area of 11,570 km^{2} and had a population of 3,157,075. The capital was Tangier. In 2015, Al Hoceïma Province from Taza-Al Hoceima-Taounate was added to it to form the region of Tanger-Tétouan-Al Hoceïma.

== Geography ==
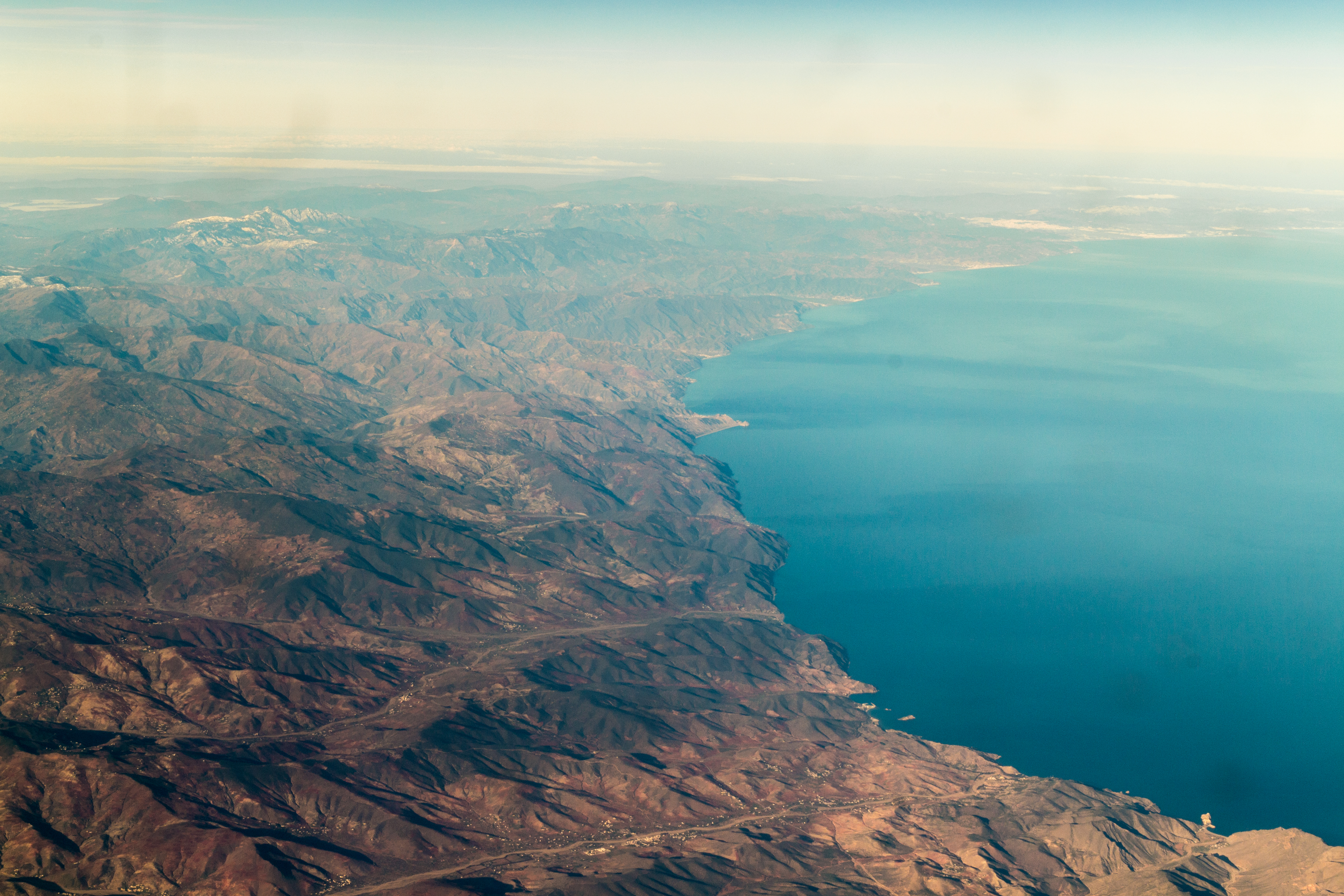
Moroccan Mediterranean Coast (West Side) - aerial photo from Bades over El Jebha to Tétouan with Rif mountains, Tangier-Tétouan region (2014)

The region has a coastline on the west formed by the Atlantic Ocean, on the north by the Strait of Gibraltar and on the east by the Mediterranean Sea. It borders the regions of Gharb-Chrarda-Béni Hssen and Taza-Al Hoceima-Taounate to the south, and also has a border with the Spanish exclave of Ceuta.

== Administrative divisions ==
The former region was subdivided into the following provinces and prefectures:

- Tangier Sub-Region
  - Prefecture of Tangier-Assilah
  - Fahs-Anjra Province
- Tétouan Sub-Region
  - Prefecture of M'diq-Fnideq
  - Chefchaouen Province
  - Larache Province
  - Ouezzane Province
  - Tétouan Province
