= Jebel Kelti =

Mountain in Tétouan Province, Morocco

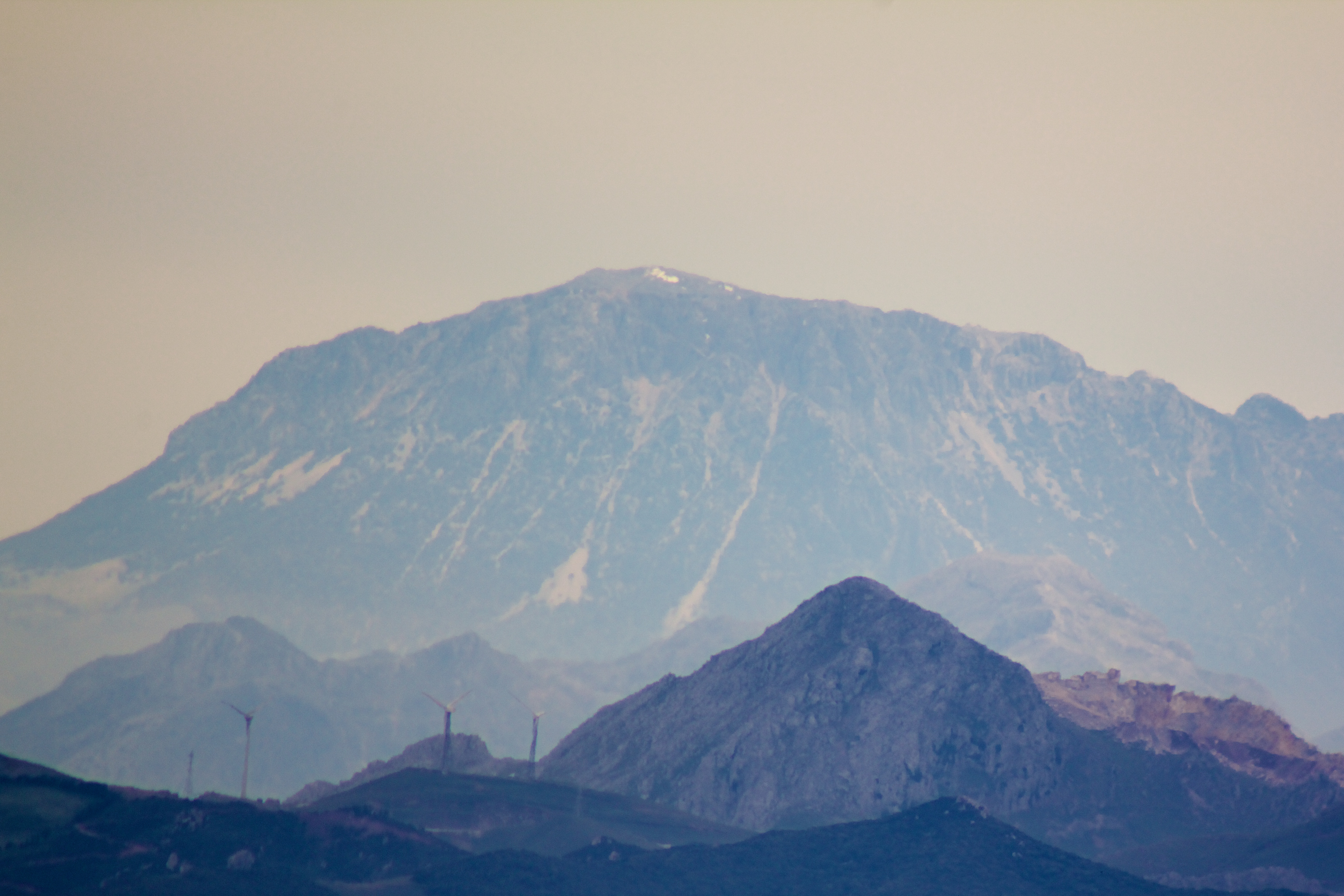
- View of Jebel Kelti

Highest point
- Elevation: 1,926 m (6,319 ft)
- Coordinates: 35°21′N 05°16′W

Geography
- Location within Morocco
- Location: Morocco
- Parent range: Rif

Geology
- Rock age: Paleozoic
- Mountain type: Limestone-dolomite

Climbing
- First ascent: Unknown
- Easiest route: From Tétouan

Jebel Kelti is a mountain in the Tanger-Tétouan-Al Hoceima region, Morocco. It is located south of Tétouan in Tétouan Province. This mountain is part of the Rif mountain chain.

== Description ==
Jebel Kelti is a limestone mountain, one of the highest in the Rif range with an elevation of about 1912 metres. It is located between Tétouan and Chefchaouen in the Tanger-Tétouan-Al Hoceima region of Morocco. It has steep sides and a small summit area that offers a panoramic view of the surrounding region. There are some well-preserved cedar forests on its slopes.
