= Kef Toghobeit =

- Interactive map of Kef Toghobeit
- Location: near Bab Taza, Morocco
- Coordinates: 35°05′20″N 5°08′27″W
- Depth: 722 m
- Length: 3,918 m

Kef Toghobeit is a karst cave near the settlement of Bab Taza in Chefchaouen Province, Tanger-Tetouan-Al Hoceima, in northern Morocco. Currently known to be 4,078 m (13,379 ft) long and 722 m (2,369 ft) deep, it is the deepest cave in Morocco, and the third deepest cave in Africa. Although Kef Toghobeit has been well-explored, its full extent is not yet known. Only 1000 caves are known in Morocco, many of them barely mapped, although the geology would suggest that many more do exist.

== Topography and formation ==
Kef Toghobeit is just one of over a thousand caves in a 30,000 square kilometre area of Karst formation in Morocco. The cave formed in the Rif mountain range, which is primarily formed of relatively soft minerals such as dolomite and limestone. Winter snowfall and rainfall add up to an annual precipitation rate of 600 to 1000 mm. The heavy precipitation quickly erodes the soft minerals, creating deep caves where the water wore away at the stone. The interior of Kef Toghobeit is covered in loose boulders and rubble.
