= Jebha =

Jebha may refer to:

- El Jebha, town in Morocco
- Eritrean Liberation Front
