= Beny Jr =

Spanish-Moroccan rapper (born 1998)

- Born: Mohamed Rifi; 12 August 1998 (age 28); Bni Ahmed Gharbia, Morocco
- Genres: UK drill, Trap
- Occupation: Rapper
- Years active: 2019–present
- Label: LF Babys

Mohamed Rifi (born 12 August 1998), known professionally as Beny Jr, is a Moroccan rapper.

== Biography ==
Mohamed Rifi was born in Bni Ahmed Gharbia, Morocco, and later in his life, he moved to the Spanish city of L'Hospitalet de Llobregat. After dropping out of high school in his second year and having problems with the Spanish justice system, at 17 he moved to London with his brothers, where he was imprisoned for two months. Upon his release, he returned to Spain but was arrested again, this time for a longer period of time.

Beny Jr decided to pursue a musical career with his friend Morad. However, his arrest prevented him from releasing music until mid-2019, when his first singles "#Freepeke" with Morad, "Maleante" and "Muévelo Así" were released.

On July 23, 2020, he released his first studio album, titled "Trap and Love." The project consisted of 11 tracks and featured collaborations with Morad and Taylor James. On December 30th of the same year it was the turn of his second album, "3O", from which the singles "No miento", "Fvrdxs" and "Bobby" were taken. On June 25, 2021, he released "Samurái," an album created in collaboration with producer El Guincho, which achieved considerable success. One of the album's tracks, "Combo la L," reached the top 10 most-streamed songs in Spain for 30 consecutive weeks. On November 24th, his second project of the year, "50/50", was released, this one in collaboration with Uruguayan producer Steve Lean. Just over a month later, on December 30, 2021, Beny Jr released a new album, titled El precio del dinero, containing 12 songs.

In 2022 Beny Jr took part in the single "Eurovision", which brought together some of the major exponents of the genre at European level: on the track he was joined by Central Cee, A2 Anti, Rondodasosa, Baby Gang, Morad, Ashe 22 and Freeze Corleone. He later collaborated with Bad Gyal on the song "Flow 2000 - remix", which reached first place in the Spanish and South American charts. On March 31, 2022, Beny Jr and Morad released a collaborative EP entitled Capítulo 1, containing the song Sigue, which achieved success, even in the following years, throughout Europe, entering the charts of various countries such as Portugal, Switzerland, France and Italy. At the end of 2022, Beny Jr ranked seventh among the most streamed Spanish artists in Spain on Spotify.

On February 14, 2023, he released ":(", a two-track EP with music videos shot in France. In June of the same year he collaborated with Argentine rapper Trueno in the single "Dubai". On December 30, 2023, Beny Jr released his fourth solo album, "La soledad aburre pero no traiciona", which featured no collaborations with other artists. Several songs from the album trended on YouTube in Spain. His fifth album, "Anti Social Cool Kid", consisting of 13 tracks, was released as a surprise in February 2024.

== Style ==
Beny Jr's music mainly ranges among genres such as drill, trap and Afrotrap, also focusing on sounds that hark back to his Moroccan origins.

== Discography ==
=== Studio albums ===
- Trap and Love (2020)
- 3O (2020)
- Samurái (2021, with El Guincho)
- 50/50 (2021, with Steve Lean)
- El precio del dinero (2021)
- La soledad aburre pero no traiciona (2023)
- Anti Social Cool Kid (2024)
- Hopefully Im Doing Well (2024)
- Champions Street League (2024)
- LowFlyer (2025)
- Samurai II (2025, with El Guincho)

=== EP ===
- Capítulo 1 (2022)
- :( (2023)
