= Bab Taza =

Coordinates: 35.0639°N 5.2025°W

Bab Taza باب تازة
- Town
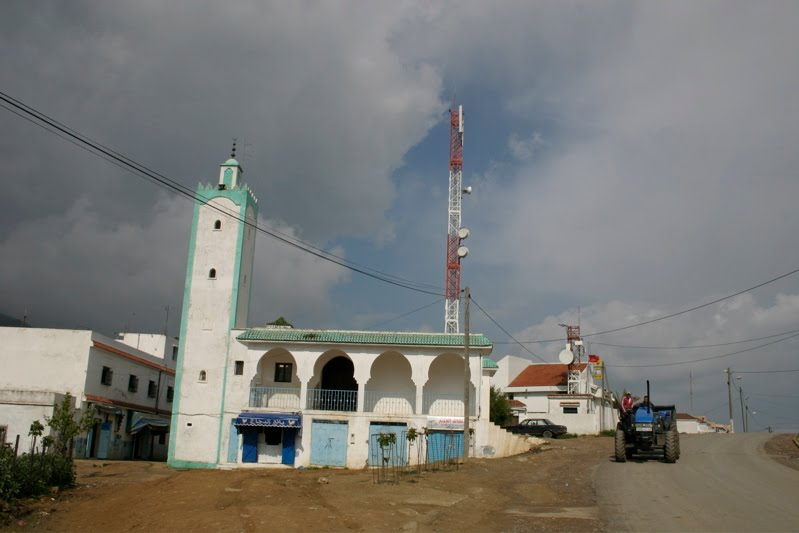
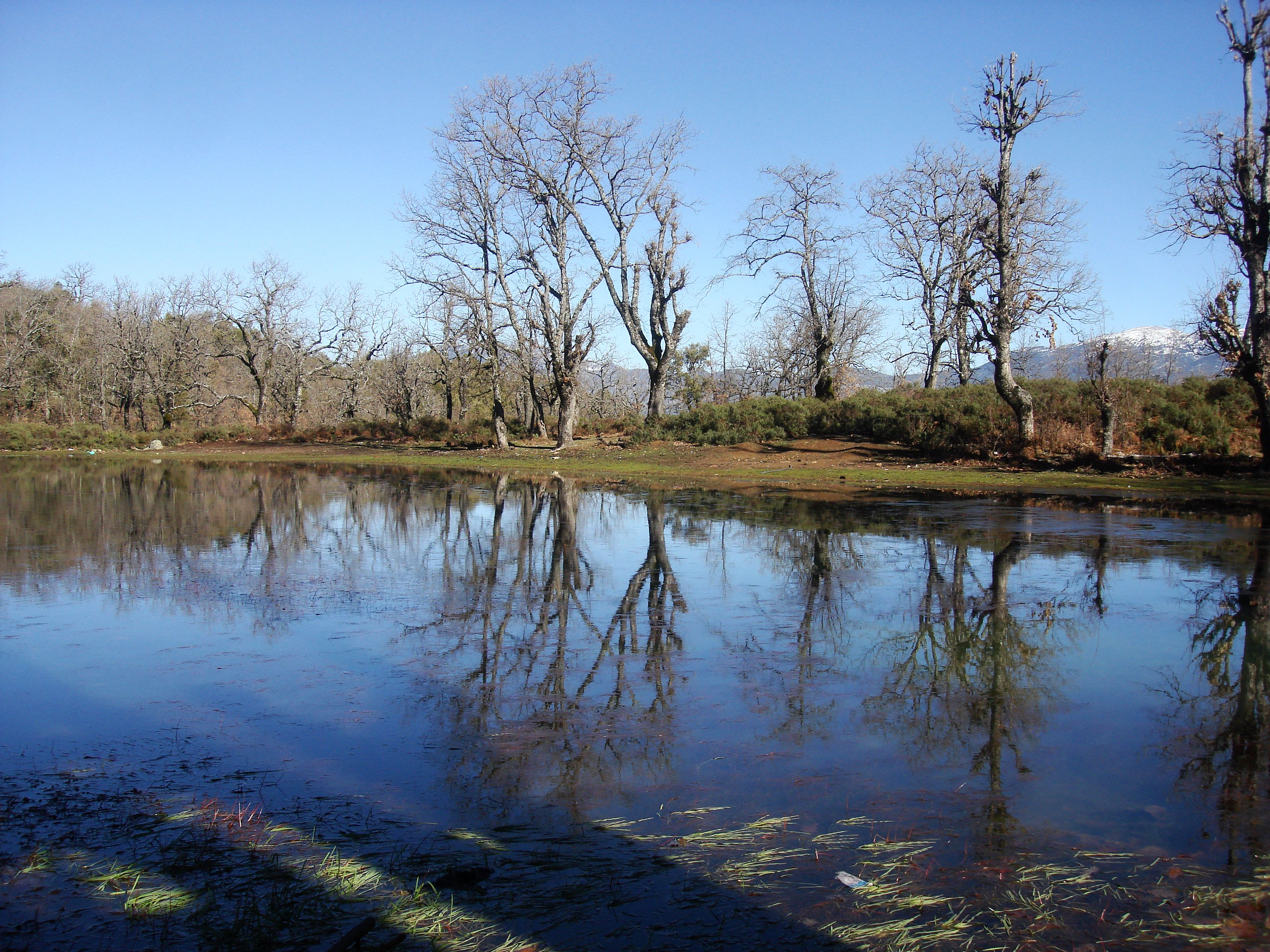
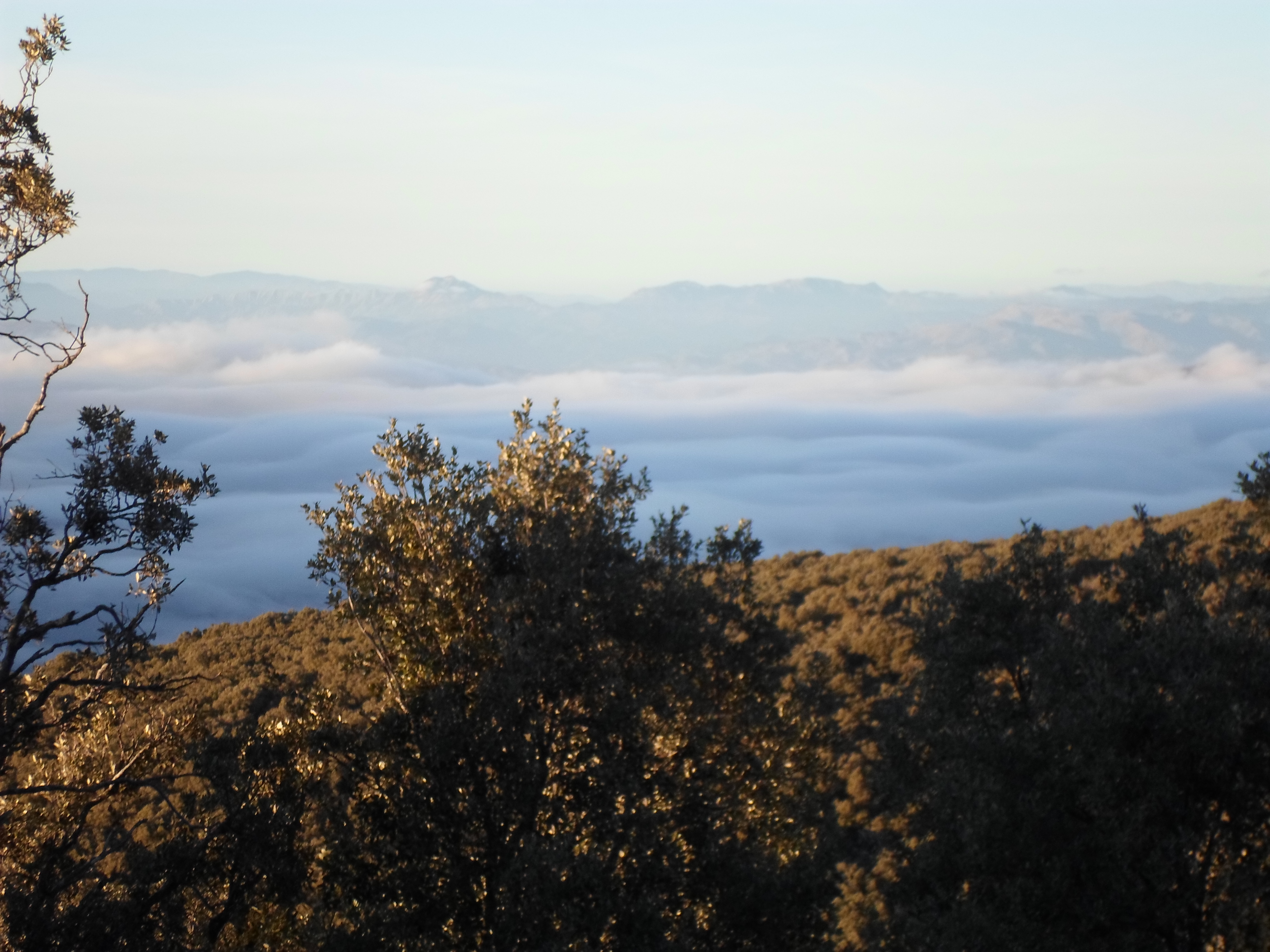
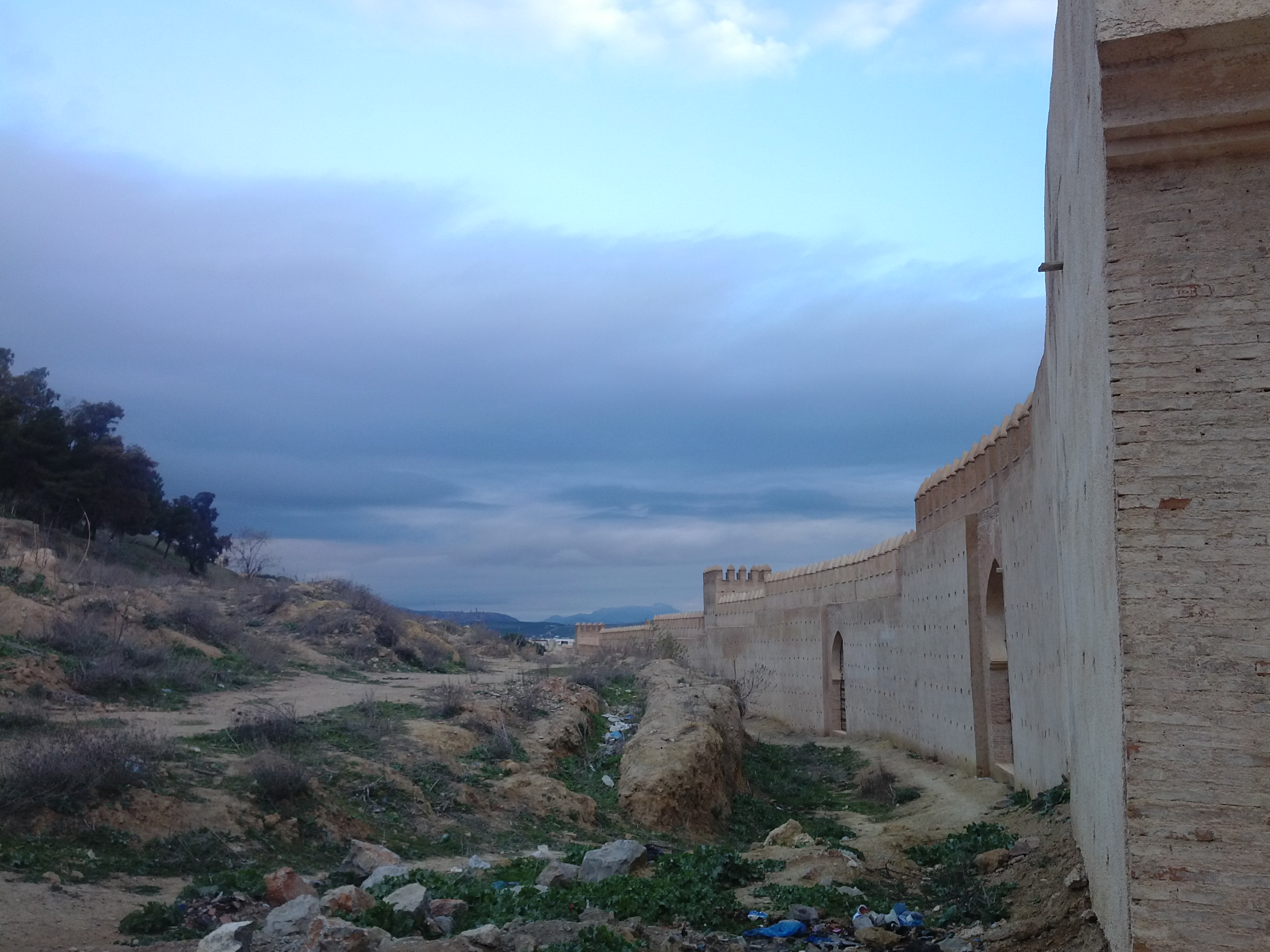
- Interactive map of Bab Taza
- Country: Morocco
- Region: Tanger-Tetouan-Al Hoceima
- Province: Chefchaouen Province

Population (2004)
  - Total: 4,066
- Time zone: UTC+0 (GMT)

Bab Taza is a town in Chefchaouen Province, Tanger-Tetouan-Al Hoceima, Morocco. According to the 2004 census it has a population of 4,066. A nearby attraction is the Kef Toghobeit Cave which is one of the deepest caves in Africa.
