= Iounane =

- Rural commune and town
- Interactive map of Iounane
- Coordinates: 35.0298°N 4.8125°W
- Country: Morocco
- Region: Tanger-Tetouan-Al Hoceima
- Province: Chefchaouen

Population (2004)
  - Total: 23,132
- Time zone: UTC+0 (GMT)

Iounane (Berber: ⵉⵢⵓⵏⴰⵏ, Iyunan) is a small town and rural commune in Chefchaouen Province, Tanger-Tetouan-Al Hoceima, Morocco. At the time of the 2004 census, the commune had a total population of 23,132 people living in 3,085 households.
