= Bab Berred =

Bab Berred باب برد (Moroccan Arabic) ⴱⴰⴱ ⴱⵔⵔⴷ (Standard Moroccan Amazigh)
- Town
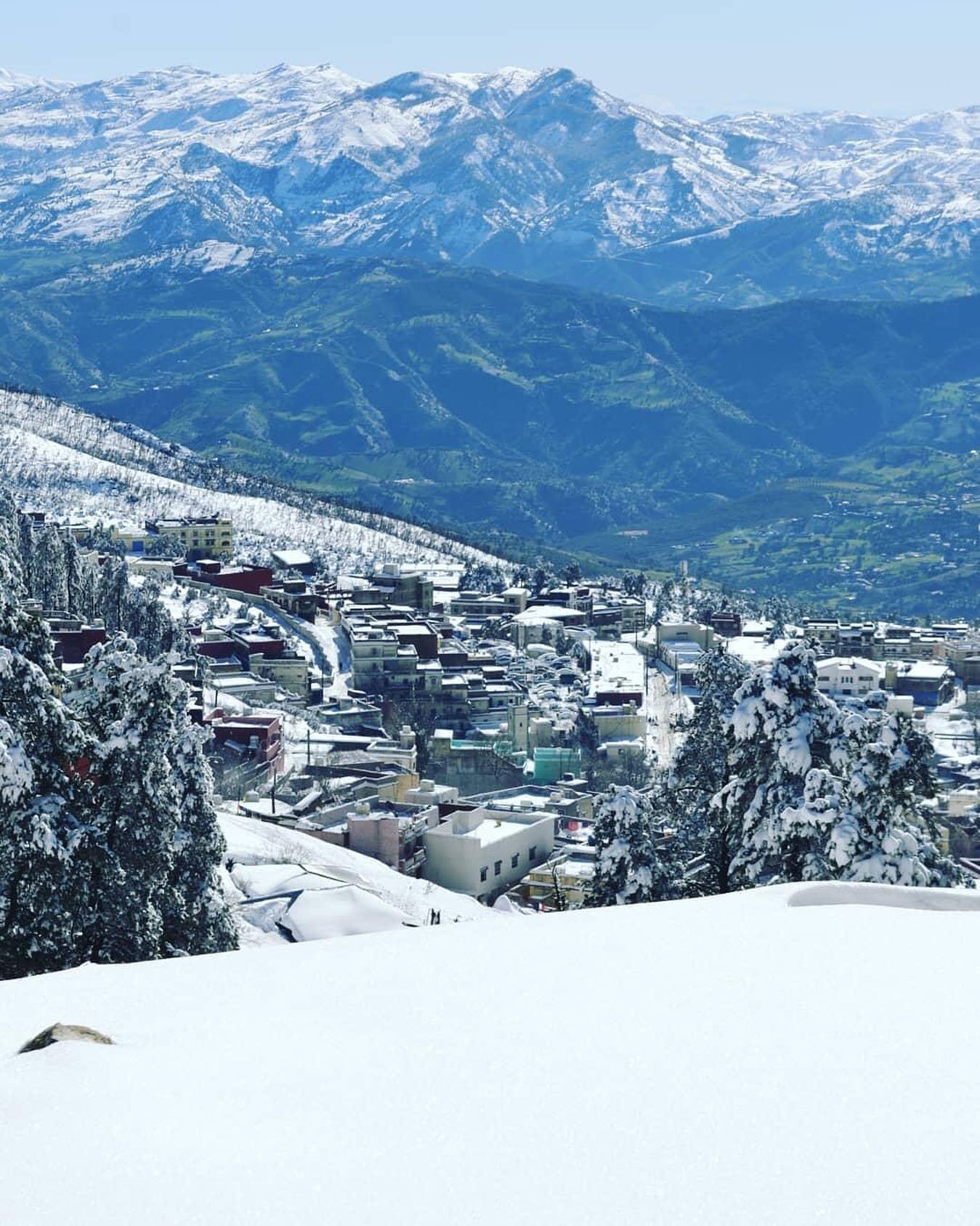
- Interactive map of Bab Berred
- Coordinates: 34.9833°N 4.91667°W
- Country: Morocco
- Region: Tanger-Tetouan-Al Hoceima
- Province: Chefchaouen Province

Population (2004)
  - Total: 5,043
- Time zone: UTC+0 (GMT)

Bab Berred is a town in Chefchaouen Province, Tanger-Tetouan-Al Hoceima, Morocco. According to the 2004 census it has a population of 5,043.
