= Bni Ahmed Cherqia =

- Rural commune and town
- Interactive map of Bni Ahmed Cherqia
- Coordinates: 34.8488°N 5.0758°W
- Country: Morocco
- Region: Tanger-Tetouan-Al Hoceima
- Province: Chefchaouen

Population (2004)
  - Total: 10,365
- Time zone: UTC+0 (GMT)

Bni Ahmed Cherqia is a small town and rural commune in Chefchaouen Province, Tanger-Tetouan-Al Hoceima, Morocco. At the time of the 2004 census, the commune had a total population of 10,365 people living in 2021 households.
