= Khalil el-Moumni =

Moroccan Imam (1941–2020)

Khalil el-Moumni (Arabic: خليل المومني; 1 July 1941 – 21 November 2020, Oujda, Morocco) was a Moroccan imam who preached at the An-Nasr Mosque in Rotterdam, the Netherlands. He was a center of controversy for his views on homosexuality, which brought him into open conflict with the Dutch politician Pim Fortuyn.

== Biography ==
He was born in Bni Mansour. In Morocco he was banned several times for speaking about "injustice" in society.

On 3 May 2001, he appeared on the Dutch television program Nova to discuss the rising incidence of anti-homosexual violence by Moroccan youths. He said that "if the sickness of homosexuality spreads itself, everyone can become infected". "That's what we are afraid of... Who will still make children if men marry among themselves and women too?".

Later, various sources reported statements from sermons of his that were published in Arabic in 1998. He said: "The western civilisation is a civilisation without morals. In the Netherlands it is permitted for homosexuals to marry each other. The Europeans stand lower than dogs and pigs".

Forty-nine individuals and organizations filed official complaints about his statements on the Nova program, under Dutch anti-discrimination laws. However a drawn-out period of reconciliation followed, involving supporters of el-Moumni, Dutch politicians, homosexuals and religious groups, in which he was gradually moved to apologize. He said that some of the Arabic statements were mistranslated.

In December 2001, the justice ministry decided to prosecute him anyway. On 4 April 2002 a court in Rotterdam announced its verdict: although in principle his statements had been discriminatory against homosexuals, they were permitted on grounds of freedom of religious expression, since they were based on the Qur'an and other Muslim documents. The justice ministry appealed the decision but lost again on 18 November 2002.

Just before reaching the age of 65, el-Moumni ended his 46-year career with a last service in the An-Nasr Mosque on 23 June 2006. In this service el-Moumni called on believers to use the mosque not only for prayer, but also for civil activities.

On 21 November 2020, el-Moumni died from COVID-19 at the age of 79.

== See also ==
- Islamic views of homosexuality
