= Eurasian plate =

Tectonic plate which includes most of Eurasia

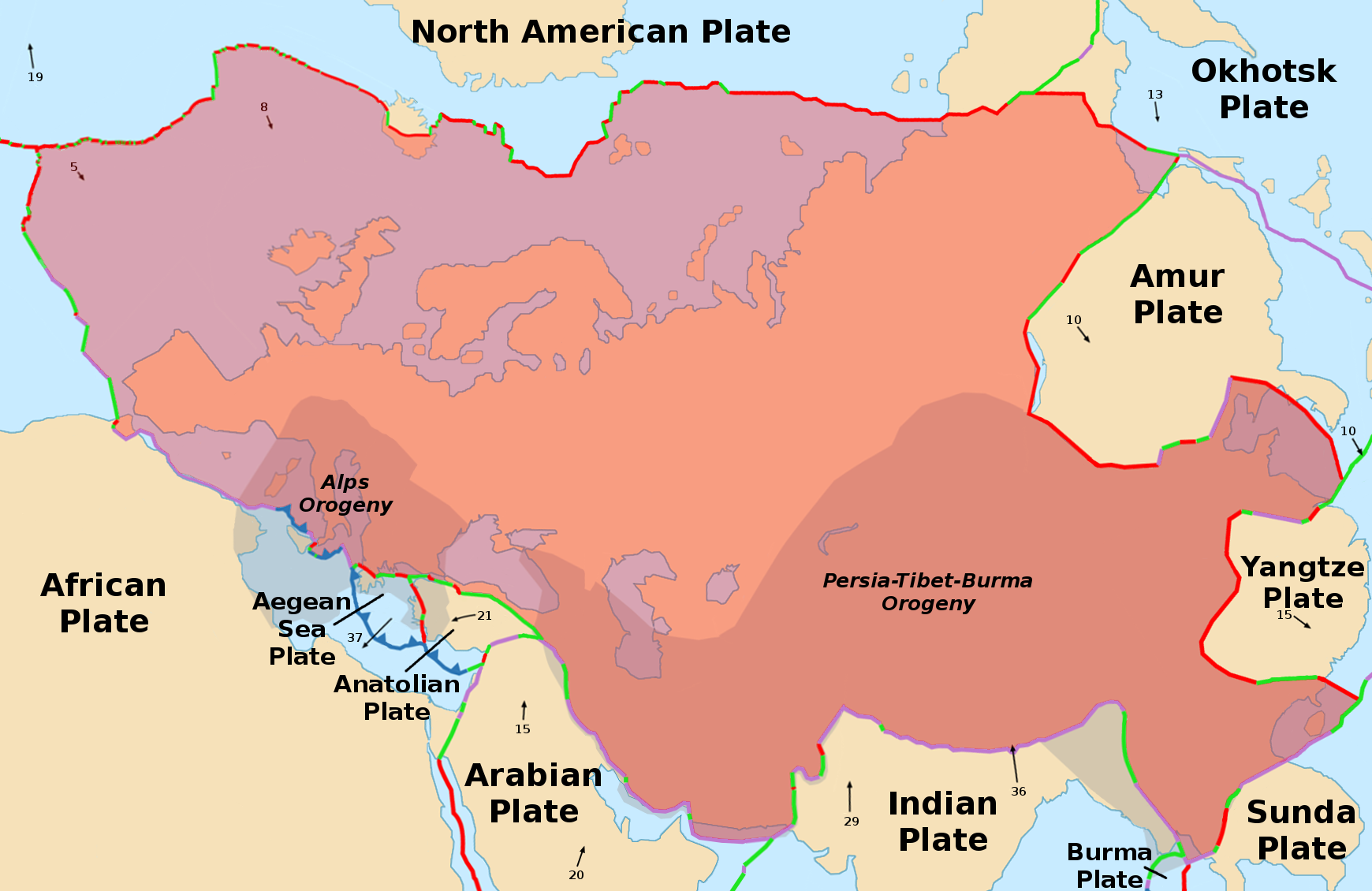
- Eurasian plate
- Type: Major
- Approximate area: 67,800,000 km^{2} (26,200,000 sq mi)
- Movement^{1}: South
- Speed^{1}: 7–14 mm (0.28–0.55 in)/year
- Features: Asia (excluding the Arabian Peninsula, the Indian subcontinent, West New Guinea, the area west of the Japanese Alps in Central Japan, East Indies and the area east of the Chersky Range in eastern Siberia), Europe (including a part of Iceland), Arctic Ocean, Atlantic Ocean
- ^{1}Relative to the African plate

The Eurasian plate is a tectonic plate that includes most of Eurasia (a landmass consisting of the traditional continents of Asia and Europe, as well as northern Morocco), with the notable exceptions of the Arabian Peninsula, the Indian subcontinent, and the area east of the Chersky Range in eastern Siberia. It also includes oceanic crust extending westward to the Mid-Atlantic Ridge and northward to the Gakkel Ridge.

== Boundaries ==
The western edge is a triple junction plate boundary with the North American plate and African plate at the seismically active Azores triple junction extending northward along the Mid-Atlantic Ridge towards Iceland. Ridges like the Mid-Atlantic ridge form at a divergent plate boundary. They are located deep underwater and very difficult to study.

There is another triple junction where the Eurasian plate meets the Arabian plate. The Anatolian sub-plate is currently being squeezed by the collision of the Eurasian plate with the Arabian plate in the East Anatolian Fault Zone.

The boundary between the North American Plate and the Eurasian Plate in the region around Japan has been described as "shifty". There are different maps for it based on recent tectonics, seismicity and earthquake focal mechanism. The simplest plate geometry draws the boundary from the Nansen Ridge through a broad zone of deformation in North Asia to the Sea of Okhotsk then south through Sakhalin Island and Hokkaido to the triple junction in the Japan Trench. But this simple view has been successfully challenged by more recent research. During the 1970s, Japan was thought to be located on the Eurasian plate at a quadruple junction with the North American plate when the eastern boundary of the North American plate was drawn through southern Hokkaido.

All volcanic eruptions in Iceland, such as the 1973 eruption of Eldfell, the 1783 eruption of Laki and the 2010 eruption of Eyjafjallajökull, are caused by the North American and the Eurasian plates moving apart, which is a result of divergent plate boundary forces.

The convergent boundary between the Eurasian plate and the Indian plate formed the Himalayas mountain range. The geodynamics of Central Asia is dominated by the interaction between the Eurasian plate and the Indian plate. In this area, many sub-plates or crust blocks have been recognized, which form the Central Asian and the East Asian transit zones.

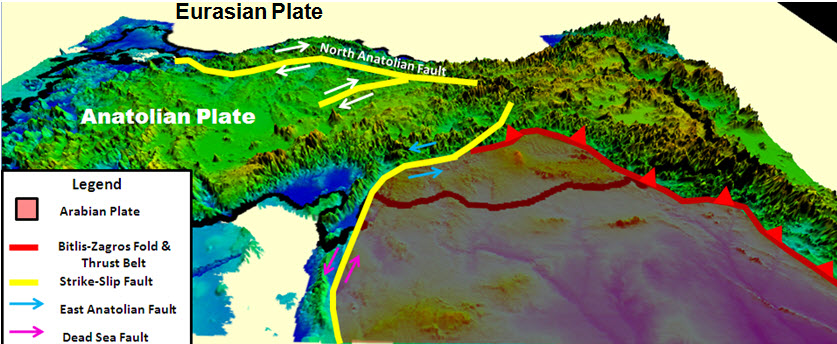
Eurasian and Anatolian plates

== See also ==
- Sunda plate
- Anatolian sub-plate
- Aegean Sea plate
