= Bni Rzine =

Bni Rzine بني رزين
- Rural commune and town
- Interactive map of Bni Rzine
- Coordinates: 35.01082°N 4.726245°W
- Country: Morocco
- Region: Tanger-Tetouan-Al Hoceima
- Province: Chefchaouen

Population (2004)
  - Total: 19,585
- Time zone: UTC+0 (GMT)

Bni Rzine is a small town and rural commune in Chefchaouen Province, Tanger-Tetouan-Al Hoceima, Morocco. At the time of the 2004 census, the commune had a total population of 19,585 people living in 2630 households. Some of the families in Bni Rzine, like Azzouz, have their roots in the Hoceima/Rif region.
