= Amtar =

- Rural commune and town
- Interactive map of Amtar
- Coordinates: 35.238469°N 4.79433°W
- Country: Morocco
- Region: Tanger-Tetouan-Al Hoceima
- Province: Chefchaouen

Population (2004)
  - Total: 10,038
- Time zone: UTC+0 (GMT)

Amtar is a small town and rural commune in Chefchaouen Province, Tanger-Tetouan-Al Hoceima, Morocco. At the time of the 2004 census, the commune had a total population of 10,038 people living in 1,459 households. The town's postcode is 91173.
