= Bni Salah =

- Rural commune and town
- Interactive map of Bni Salah
- Coordinates: 34.996381°N 5.045106°W
- Country: Morocco
- Region: Tanger-Tetouan-Al Hoceima
- Province: Chefchaouen

Population (2004)
  - Total: 9,662
- Time zone: UTC+0 (GMT)

Bni Salah (بني صالح) is a small town and rural commune in Chefchaouen Province, Tanger-Tetouan-Al Hoceima, Morocco. At the time of the 2004 census, the commune had a total population of 9662 people living in 1384 households.
