= Talambote =

Coordinates: 35°15′N 5°11′W

- Rural commune and town
- Interactive map of Talambote
- Country: Morocco
- Region: Tanger-Tetouan-Al Hoceima
- Province: Chefchaouen

Population (2004)
  - Total: 10,639
- Time zone: UTC+0 (GMT)

Talambote is a small town and rural commune in Chefchaouen Province, Tanger-Tetouan-Al Hoceima, Morocco. At the time of the 2004 census, the commune had a total population of 10,639 people living in 1465 households.
