= Tanaqoub =

- Rural commune and village
- Interactive map of Tanaqoub
- Coordinates: 35.1091°N 5.4577°W
- Country: Morocco
- Region: Tanger-Tetouan-Al Hoceima
- Province: Chefchaouen

Population (2024)
  - Total: 8,097
- Time zone: UTC+0 (GMT)

Tanaqoub is a small village and rural commune in Chefchaouen Province, Tanger-Tetouan-Al Hoceima, Morocco. At the time of the 2024 census, the commune had a total population of 8097 people living in 1808 households.
