= Oued Malha =

- Rural commune and town
- Location within Morocco Location within Africa
- Coordinates: 34.923°N 5.045°W
- Country: Morocco
- Region: Tanger-Tetouan-Al Hoceima
- Province: Chefchaouen

Population (2004)
  - Total: 12,088
- Time zone: UTC+0 (GMT)

Oued Malha is a small town and rural commune in Chefchaouen Province, Tanger-Tetouan-Al Hoceima, Morocco. At the time of the 2004 census, the commune had a total population of 12,088 people living in 1974 households.
