= Malika Arabi =

Algerian writer

- Born: March 8, 1951 (age 75); Tizi Ouzou
- Writing career
- Genre: novel

Malika Arabi (born March 8, 1951, in the wilaya of Tizi Ouzou) is an Algerian writer. She is the author of a trilogy: Shards of Life (2011), Walking in My Father's Footsteps (2013), and Broken Destinies (2015).

== Life ==
Malika Arabi was born in Kabylie, Mizrana, in the village of Tarsift near Tigzirt. She attended primary school at Tala Mayache school, and the technical school of Caroubier in Algiers to go to secondary school. In 2013, she appeared at the Boudjima Book Fair.

== Works ==
- Éclats de vie (2011), ISBN 9782953951707, OCLC 762717780
- Marcher dans les pas de mon père (2013) ISBN 9782953951714, OCLC 858187148
- Destins brisés (2015). ISBN 9782953951721, OCLC 919026611
