= Taourirt =

Taourirt may refer to several places:

- Taourirt, Algeria, a village in Bouïra Province, Algeria
- Taourirt, Béjaïa, a village in Béjaïa Province, Algeria
- Taourirt, Morocco, a city in Taourirt Province, Morocco
- Taourirt Province, Morocco
- Kasbah Taourirt, a historic site in Ouarzazate, Morocco
