= Ouaouzgane =

Coordinates: 35°01′N 4°31′W

- Rural commune and town
- Interactive map of Ouaouzgane
- Country: Morocco
- Region: Tanger-Tetouan-Al Hoceima
- Province: Chefchaouen

Population (2004)
  - Total: 16,075
- Time zone: UTC+0 (GMT)

Ouaouzgane is a small town and rural commune in Chefchaouen Province, Tanger-Tetouan-Al Hoceima, Morocco. At the time of the 2004 census, the commune had a total population of 16,075 living in 2,279 households.
