= Bni Darkoul =

- Rural commune and town
- Interactive map of Bni Darkoul
- Coordinates: 35.056313°N 5.068753°W
- Country: Morocco
- Region: Tanger-Tetouan-Al Hoceima
- Province: Chefchaouen

Population (2004)
  - Total: 11,706
- Time zone: UTC+0 (GMT)

Bni Darkoul is a small town and rural commune in Chefchaouen Province, Tanger-Tetouan-Al Hoceima, Morocco. At the time of the 2004 census, the commune had a total population of 11,706 people living in 1888 households.
