= Fifi, Morocco =

Fifi
- Rural commune and town
- Location within Morocco Location within Africa
- Coordinates: 34.946°N 5.243°W
- Country: Morocco
- Region: Tanger-Tetouan-Al Hoceima
- Province: Chefchaouen

Population (2004)
  - Total: 7,720
- Time zone: UTC+0 (GMT)

Fifi is a small town and rural commune in Chefchaouen Province, Tanger-Tetouan-Al Hoceima, Morocco. At the time of the 2004 census, the commune had a total population of 7720 people living in 1312 households.
