= Derdara =

- Rural commune and town
- Interactive map of Derdara
- Coordinates: 35.1103°N 5.2872°W
- Country: Morocco
- Region: Tanger-Tetouan-Al Hoceima
- Province: Chefchaouen

Population (2004)
  - Total: 10,762
- Time zone: UTC+0 (GMT)

Derdara is a small town and rural commune in Chefchaouen Province, Tanger-Tetouan-Al Hoceima, Morocco. At the time of the 2004 census, the commune had a total population of 10,762 people living in 1,644 households.
