= Bni Faghloum =

- Rural commune and town
- Interactive map of Bni Faghloum
- Coordinates: 34.8952°N 5.1548°W
- Country: Morocco
- Region: Tanger-Tetouan-Al Hoceima
- Province: Chefchaouen

Population (2004)
  - Total: 9,951
- Time zone: UTC+0 (GMT)

Bni Faghloum is a small town and rural commune in Chefchaouen Province, Tanger-Tetouan-Al Hoceima, Morocco. At the time of the 2004 census, the commune had a total population of 9951 people living in 1603 households.
