= Laghdir =

- Rural commune and town
- Interactive map of Laghdir
- Coordinates: 35.0293°N 5.4051°W
- Country: Morocco
- Region: Tanger-Tetouan-Al Hoceima
- Province: Chefchaouen

Population (2004)
  - Total: 7,077
- Time zone: UTC+0 (GMT)

Laghdir is a small town and rural commune in Chefchaouen Province, Tanger-Tetouan-Al Hoceima, Morocco. At the time of the 2004 census, the commune had a total population of 7077 people living in 1278 households.
