= Bni Smih =

Bni Smih بني سميح
- Rural commune and town
- Interactive map of Bni Smih
- Coordinates: 35.1373°N 4.7107°W
- Country: Morocco
- Region: Tanger-Tetouan-Al Hoceima
- Province: Chefchaouen

Population (2004)
  - Total: 15,577
- Time zone: UTC+0 (GMT)

Bni Smih is a small town and rural commune in Chefchaouen Province, Tanger-Tetouan-Al Hoceima, Morocco. At the time of the 2004 census, the commune had a total population of 15,577 people living in 2109 households.
