= Chefchaouen Province =

Province in Tanger-Tetouan-Al Hoceima, Morocco

Coordinates: 35°10′17″N 5°16′11″W

Chefchaouen Province إقليم شفشاون ⵜⴰⵙⴳⴰ ⵏ ⵛⴼⵛⴰⵡⵏ
- Province
- Akchour, Talambote El Jebha beach and harbor, M'Tioua Bab Berred in winter
- Interactive map of Chefchaouen Province
- Country: Morocco
- Region: Tanger-Tetouan-Al Hoceima
- Seat: Chefchaouen

Population (2024)
  - Total: 412,713

Chefchaouen Province (Arabic: شفشاون, Standard Moroccan Tamazight: ⵛⴼⵛⴰⵡⵏ) is a province in the Tanger-Tetouan-Al Hoceima region of Morocco. Its capital is Chefchaouen.

The city of Chefchaouen is the only official municipality in the province, established in 1975.

Other towns in the province include:

- Bab Berred
- Bab Taza
- Jebha

== Demographics ==
According to the 2024 Moroccan census, the province had a population of 412,713 inhabitants, of which approximately 85% lived in rural areas.

== Geography ==
Chefchaouen Province is located in northern Morocco and is bordered by Tétouan Province to the northwest, Larache Province to the west, Al Hoceïma Province to the east, Taounate Province to the south, and Ouezzane Province to the southwest. It also has a coastline along the Mediterranean Sea to the northeast.

The province lies within the Rif mountain range and is characterized by rugged terrain and a predominantly rural landscape. It consists of one urban commune (the municipality of Chefchaouen) and 27 rural communes.

== Subdivisions ==
Communes of Chefchaouen Province

The province is divided administratively into the following:

=== Rural communes ===
Name	Geographic code	Households (2024)	Population (2024)	Notes
Amtar	151.09.01.	1814	8568	
Bab Berred	151.03.03.	5557	24743	Urban centre: Bab Berred (5,947 inhabitants; 1,488 households)
Bab Taza	151.05.01.	6246	29895	Urban centre: Bab Taza (6,046 inhabitants; 1,462 households)
Bni Ahmed Cherqia	151.06.05.	2668	10800	
Bni Ahmed Gharbia	151.06.07.	2655	10623	
Bni Bouzra	151.07.01.	3363	15888	
Bni Darkoul	151.05.03.	2870	13984	
Bni Faghloum	151.05.05.	2165	9260	
Bni Mansour	151.11.03.	3154	16660	
Bni Rzine	151.09.09.	3366	16539	
Bni Salah	151.05.07.	2057	10535	
Bni Selmane	151.11.05.	3958	21413	
Bni Smih	151.09.11.	2780	13918	
Derdara	151.05.09.	2506	11276	
Fifi	151.05.11.	1627	6762	
Iounane	151.03.13.	3966	19494	
Laghdir	151.05.13.	1526	6454	
Mansoura	151.06.15.	2960	13526	
M'Tioua	151.09.17.	2430	10336	Urban centre: Jebha (4,471 inhabitants; 1,187 households)
Ouaouzgane	151.09.19.	2771	12766	
Oued Malha	151.06.21.	2638	12075	
Talambote	151.07.09.	1598	8007	
Tamorot	151.03.23.	5304	24258	
Tanaqoub	151.05.15.	1808	8097	
Tassift	151.07.11.	1459	6924	
Tizgane	151.07.13.	2804	12292	
Steha	151.07.07.	2432	11452	

=== Municipalities ===
Name	Geographic code	Households (2024)	Population (2024)	Notes
Chefchaouen	151.01.01.	12474	46168	

== Environment ==
=== Mountains ===
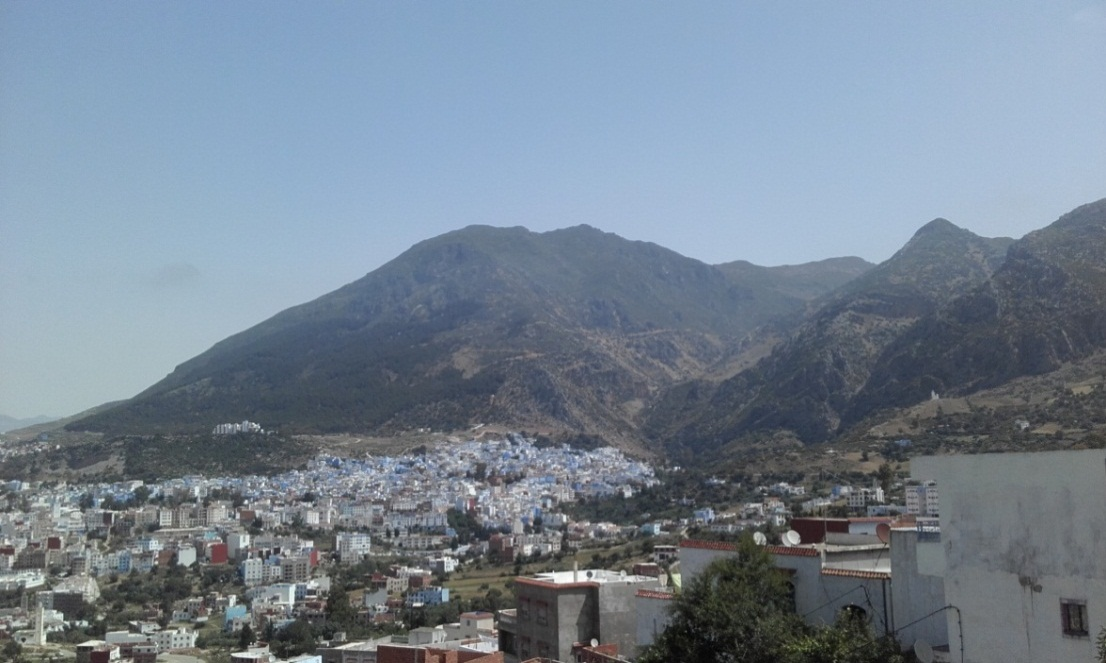
A panoramic view of Chefchaouen situated within a mountainous area

The Chefchaouen Mountains are composed of very rugged siliceous and limestone layers, with some peaks exceeding 2,000 m (6,600 ft) above sea level, such as Jbel Lakraa and Jbel Tissouka in the rural commune of Bab Taza, as well as Jbel Tizirane in the rural commune of Bab Berred.

Chefchaouen and its surroundings were historically and geographically known as the Jbala region or country (i.e. mountain inhabitants) where many Jbala tribes once lived. The Jbala region was officially described at the beginning of the 20th century as a geographical territory corresponding to the foothills of the southwestern Rif, between the massifs of the central Rif and the pre-Rif domain.

=== Forests ===
Natural forests cover around 118,957 hectares (293,950 acres) and are dominated by broad-leaved trees. Forest formations are distributed according to local variations of climate and soil due to altitude, lithology, and human activity. There are sclerophyllous oaks such as cork oak (Quercus suber), holm oak (Quercus rotundifolia), and kermes oak (Quercus coccifera), deciduous oaks such as Tauzin oak (Quercus pyrenaica) and zeen oak (Quercus canariensis and Quercus faginea), and natural coniferous forests such as Maghreb maritime pine (Pinus pinaster var. maghrebiana), Moroccan fir (Abies maroccana) and Atlas cedar (Cedrus atlantica).

The province of Chefchaouen is considered one of the richest regions in terms of biological diversity. It is designated as a Mediterranean biodiversity hotspot (i.e. a zone with an exceptional concentration of endemic and threatened species) and suffers from accelerated forest degradation due to anthropogenic pressures exacerbated by the impact of climate change. Two protected areas have been created in the province:

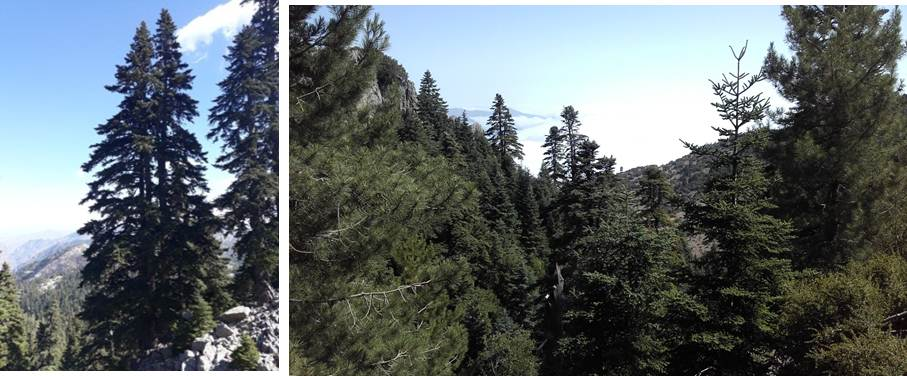
Moroccan fir forest in the Talassemtane National Park

- Talassemtane National Park, created in 2004, covers an area of about 60,000 ha (150,000 acres), 80% of which is in the province of Chefchaouen. The park extends over the eastern part of the limestone ridge of the central-western Rif, with cliffs and gorges making accessibility very limited. The park aims to protect the endemic Moroccan fir forest, and species such as Atlas cedar, black pine (Pinus nigra subsp. mauretanica), and Maghreb maritime pine. In terms of fauna, there are 37 mammal species including the threatened Barbary macaque (Macaca sylvanus), the otter (Lutra lutra), more than 117 birds including some rare or very rare raptors, and around thirty species of reptiles and amphibians.

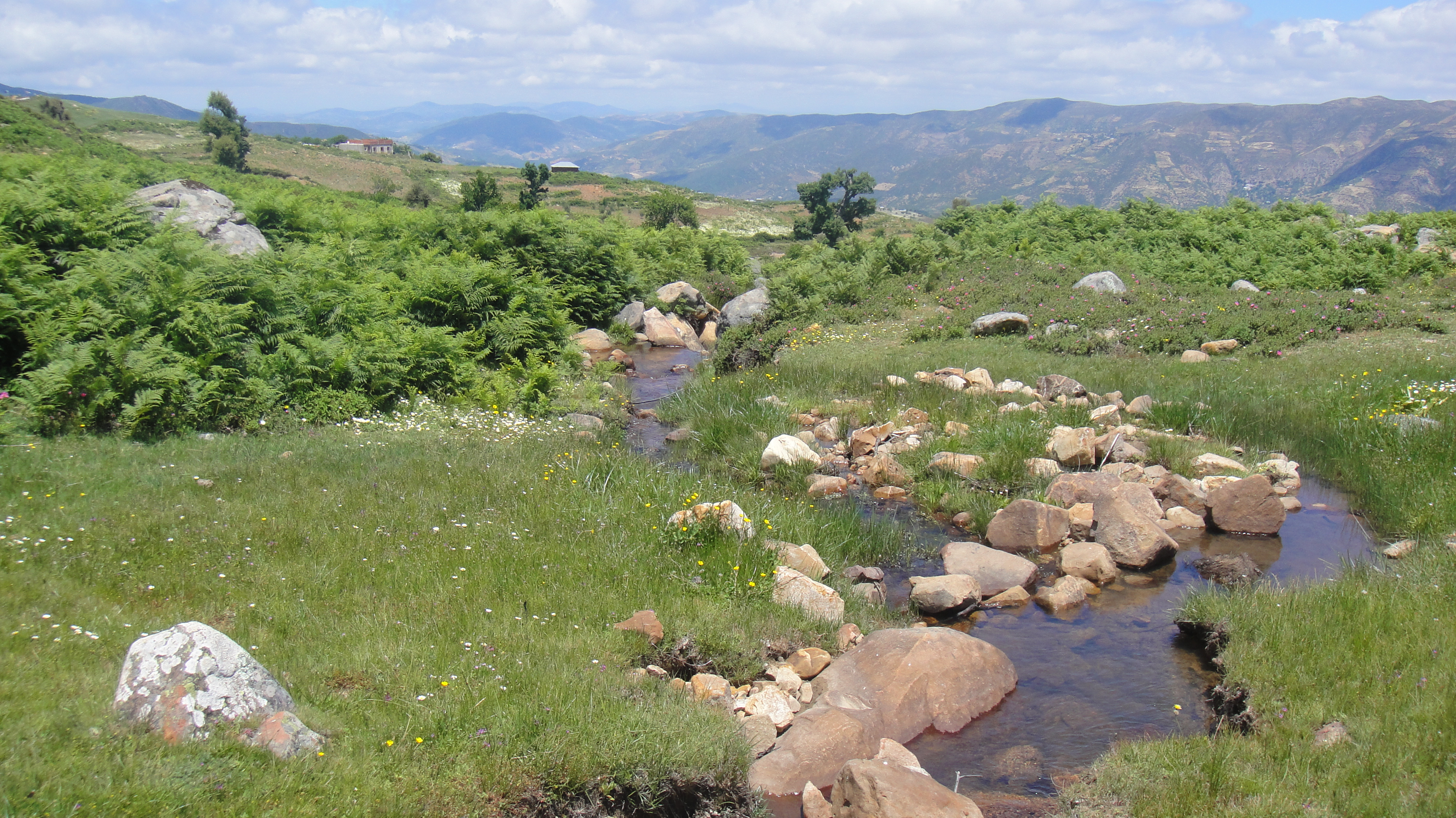
A panoramic view from the future Natural Regional Park of Bouhachem.

- Bouhachem Regional Park, created in 2006 over an area of around 105,000 ha (260,000 acres), overlapping the provinces of Chefchaouen, Tetouan, and Larache. It was created to preserve natural forests and restore related natural resources and services.

In 2006, these two parks were included in the Mediterranean Intercontinental Biosphere Reserve of Spain and Morocco, established in the context of UNESCO's Man and the Biosphere (MAN) program. Reforestation programs have been carried out since 1966, and by 2016 had generated 16,119 ha (39,830 acres).

=== Water resources ===
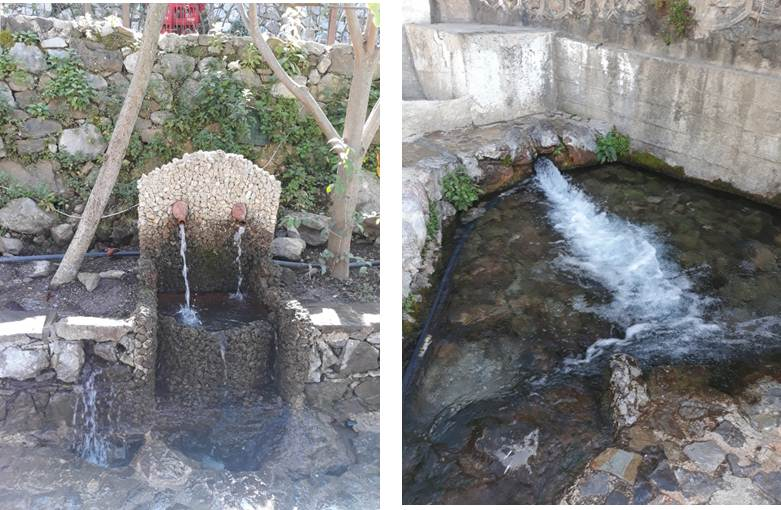
Illustrations of water resources emerging from "Ras El Maa".

High rainfall at altitude provides a potential for hydrological development. Several seasonal rivers flow into the Mediterranean or feed the Loukos or Ouargha rivers.

== Economy ==
=== Agriculture and sea fishing ===
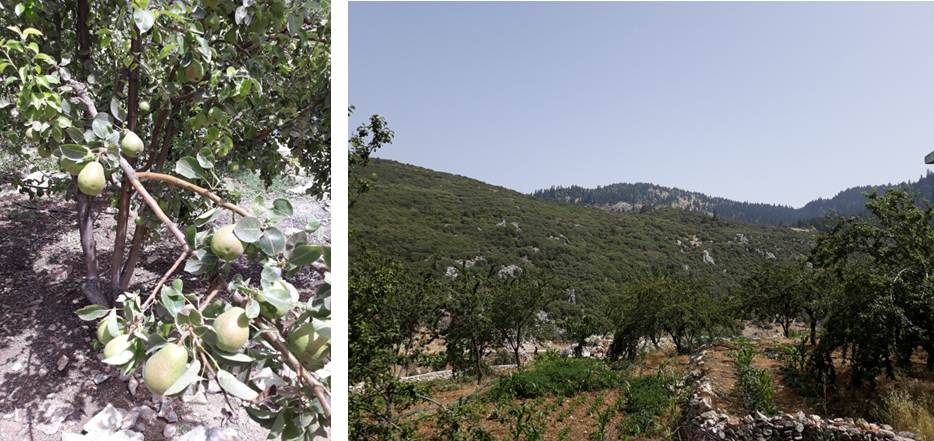
Illustrations of fruit plantations in the environs of Chefchaouen.

Despite the significant rainfall, agricultural activity is limited due to the rugged and steep topography, the scarcity of arable land, the low mechanization level, and the lack of irrigation infrastructure. These factors have contributed to the emergence of traditional agriculture largely dependent on climatic hazards. Forests have been harvested for wood and pulp products and to clear land for agriculture. Villagers from rural areas form an important workforce in the agricultural field.

The province is dominated by cereal agriculture, goat herding in the mountains, and arboriculture of fig and almond trees. The countryside has a reputation as a prolific source of kief. The Chefchaouen region is one of the main producers of cannabis in Morocco.

- Cereal cultivation: Occupying an area around 23,100 ha (57,000 acres), cereals are the most prevalent crops in the province;
- Legumes: Legumes are cultivated over an area of around 3,220 ha (8,000 acres). Beans and broad beans are the most widely cultivated and occupy more than three-quarters of the area devoted to this type of crop;
- Vegetable and forage crops: are cultivated over an area of about 180 ha (440 acres);
- Fruit arboriculture: fruit tree plantations cover approximately 52,013 ha (128,530 acres), producing 654,930 quintals (65,493 tonnes) of fruit. The olive tree is the most widespread with 83% of the area, representing 66% of the total production.
- Animal husbandry: Production of red meat is estimated at 1,037.4 tons in 2016, of which 70% is beef, the rest mutton, and goat.
- Maritime fishing: The province's 120 km (75 mi) of the Mediterranean coast recorded landings of 2,166 tons of fish in 2016, valued at 14.3 million Moroccan dirhams. 94.4% of landings were bluefish.

This traditional agro-pastoral system – of olive and fig plantations, cereal fields, and limited grazing pastures – has been carried out for centuries. Local products are also diversified, such as fresh goat cheese and other animal products, medicinal and aromatic plants, and products based on wild olives, figs, wool, etc. These various agricultural models have contributed to a richness of food diversity and, in 2010, UNESCO recognized Chefchaouen for its Mediterranean diet.

=== Industry and commerce ===
The industrial sector remains very weak despite the province's potential with its availability of human and natural resources. The commercial sector is one of the main economic supports of Chefchaouen, bolstered by tourism activity and remittances from workers abroad. It is mainly focused on urban centers and the main rural communes and is based on the sale of traditional food products, construction materials, clothing, and household items. Commercial transactions become dynamic during summer, with the influx of tourists and the return of foreign workers to the province.
