= M'Tioua =

- Rural commune
- Interactive map of M'Tioua
- Coordinates: 35.2058°N 4.6665°W
- Country: Morocco
- Region: Tanger-Tetouan-Al Hoceima
- Province: Chefchaouen

Population (2004)
  - Total: 12,076
- Time zone: UTC+0 (GMT)

M'Tioua is a rural commune in Chefchaouen Province, Tanger-Tetouan-Al Hoceima, Morocco. At the time of the 2004 census, the commune had a total population of 12,076 people living in 1867 households.
