= Bni Mansour =

- Rural commune and town
- Location within Morocco Location within Africa
- Coordinates: 35.1586°N 4.9127°W
- Country: Morocco
- Region: Tanger-Tetouan-Al Hoceima
- Province: Chefchaouen

Population (2004)
  - Total: 18,542
- Time zone: UTC+0 (GMT)

Bni Mansour (Arabic: بني منصور) is a small town and rural commune in Chefchaouen Province, Tanger-Tetouan-Al Hoceima, Morocco. At the time of the 2004 census, the commune had a total population of 18,542 people living in 2468 households.
