= Taourirt, Algeria =

Taourirt
- Location within Algeria
- Coordinates: 36°19′47″N 4°18′51″E
- Country: Algeria
- Province: Bouïra Province
- Time zone: UTC+1 (West Africa Time)

Taourirt is a village in northern Algeria. It is located in Bouïra Province.

Nearby towns and villages include Tassift (3.0 nm), M'Chedallah(3.1 nm), Chorfa (2.6 nm), Boudjellil (1.9 nm) and Sidi Brahim (5.9 nm).

The place is located along the N5 road which leads to Adjiba.
