= Bni Ahmed Gharbia =

Beni Ahmed Gharbia
- Rural commune and town
- Interactive map of Beni Ahmed Gharbia
- Coordinates: 34.8161°N 5.1095°W
- Country: Morocco
- Region: Tanger-Tetouan-Al Hoceima
- Province: Chefchaouen

Population (2004)
  - Total: 12,923
- Time zone: UTC+0 (GMT)

Bni Ahmed Gharbia is a small town and rural commune in Chefchaouen Province, Tanger-Tetouan-Al Hoceima, Morocco. At the time of the 2004 census, the commune had a total population of 12,923 people living in 2286 households.
