= El Jebha =

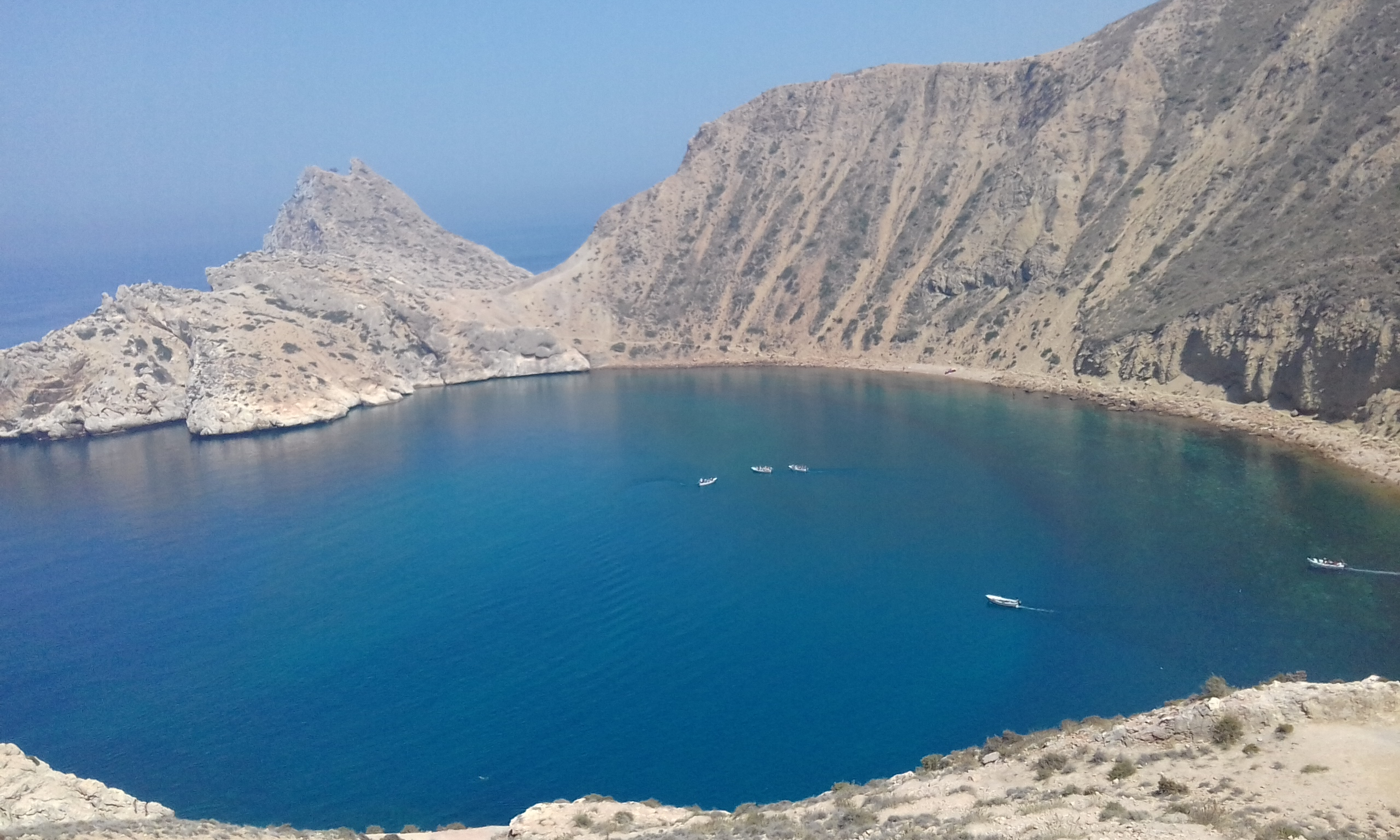
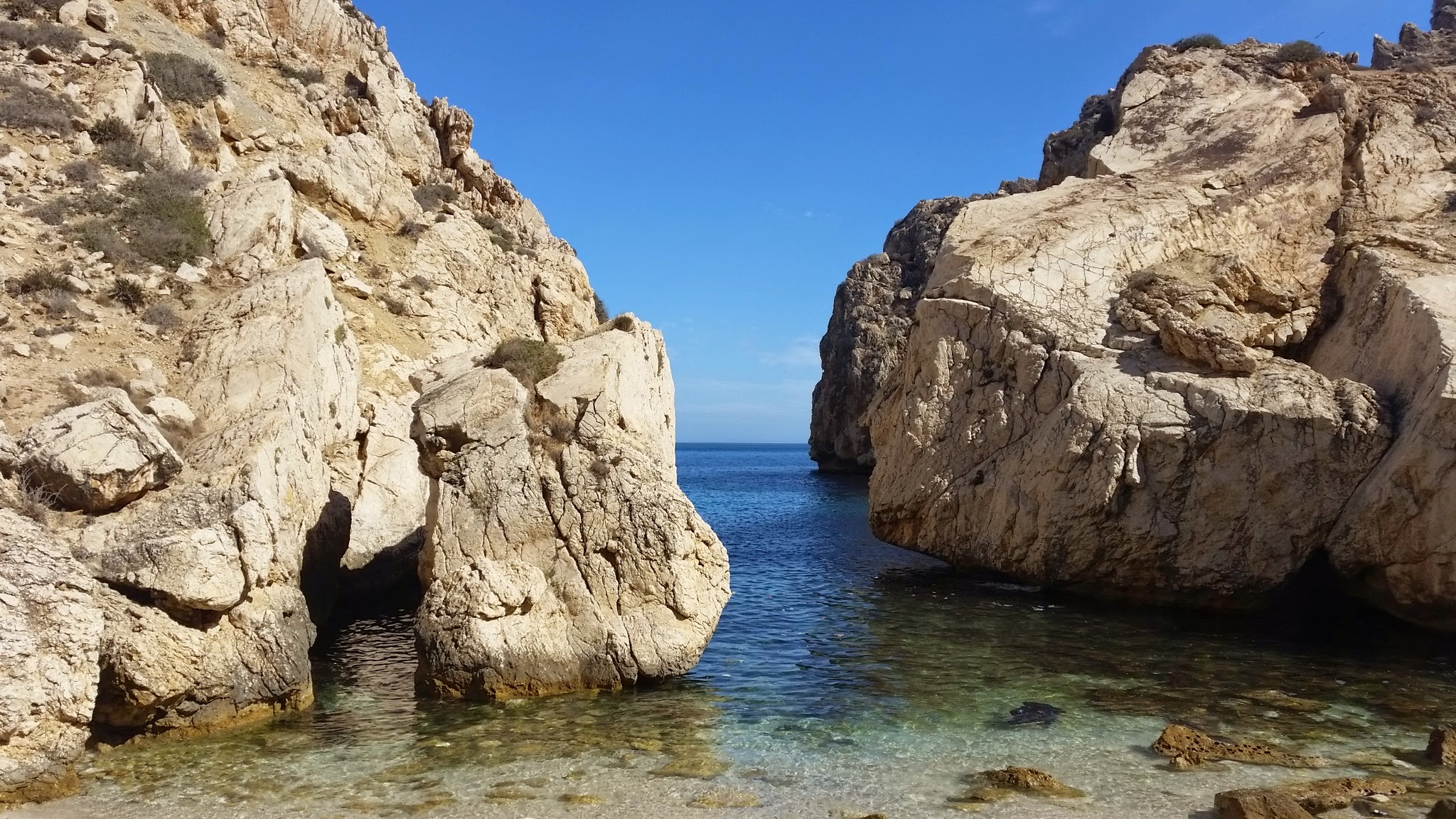
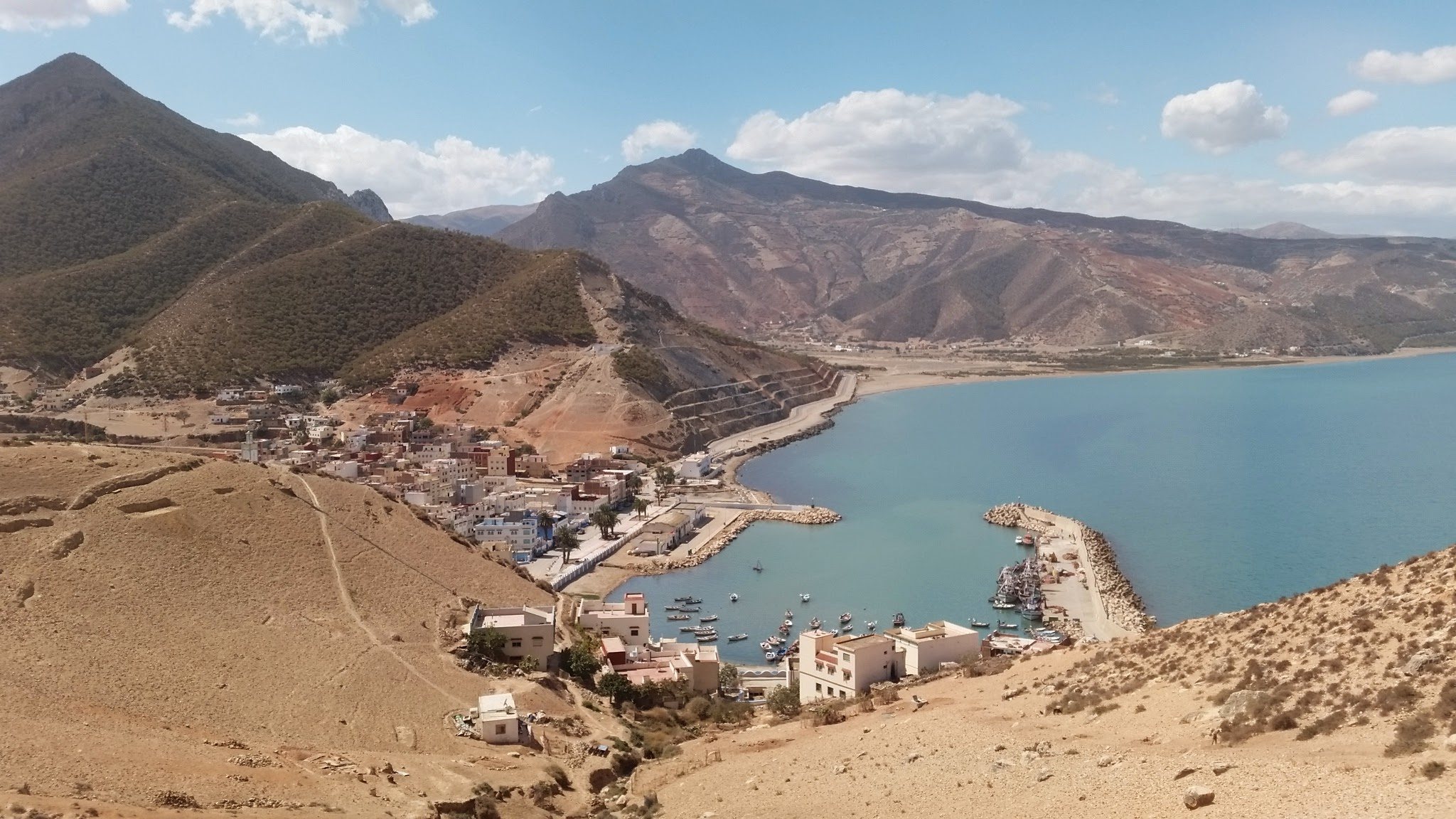
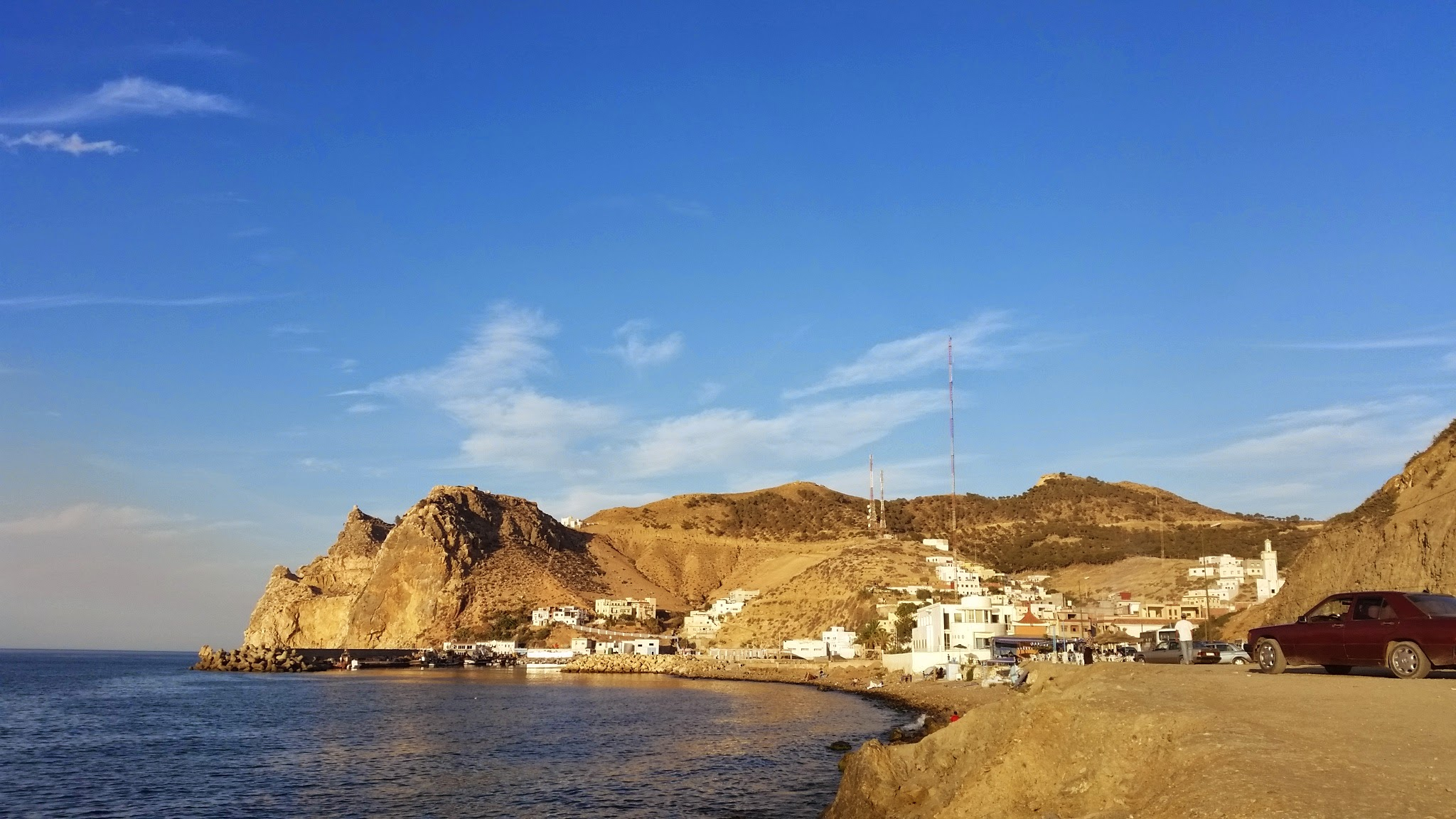
- Interactive map of El Jebha
- Coordinates: 35°12′18″N 4°39′58″W
- Country: Morocco
- Region: Tanger-Tetouan-Al Hoceima
- Province: Chefchaouen
- Commune: M'Tioua

Population (2004)
  - Total: 2,984
- Time zone: UTC+0 (GMT)

El Jebha is a small port town in northern Morocco. It is situated in a small valley where the Rif Mountains meet the Mediterranean Sea, and along the coastal route connecting Northwestern to Northeastern Morocco. El Jebha is the capital of the Mtiwa commune, which is part of Chefchaouen Province in the region of Tanger-Tetouan-Al Hoceima.

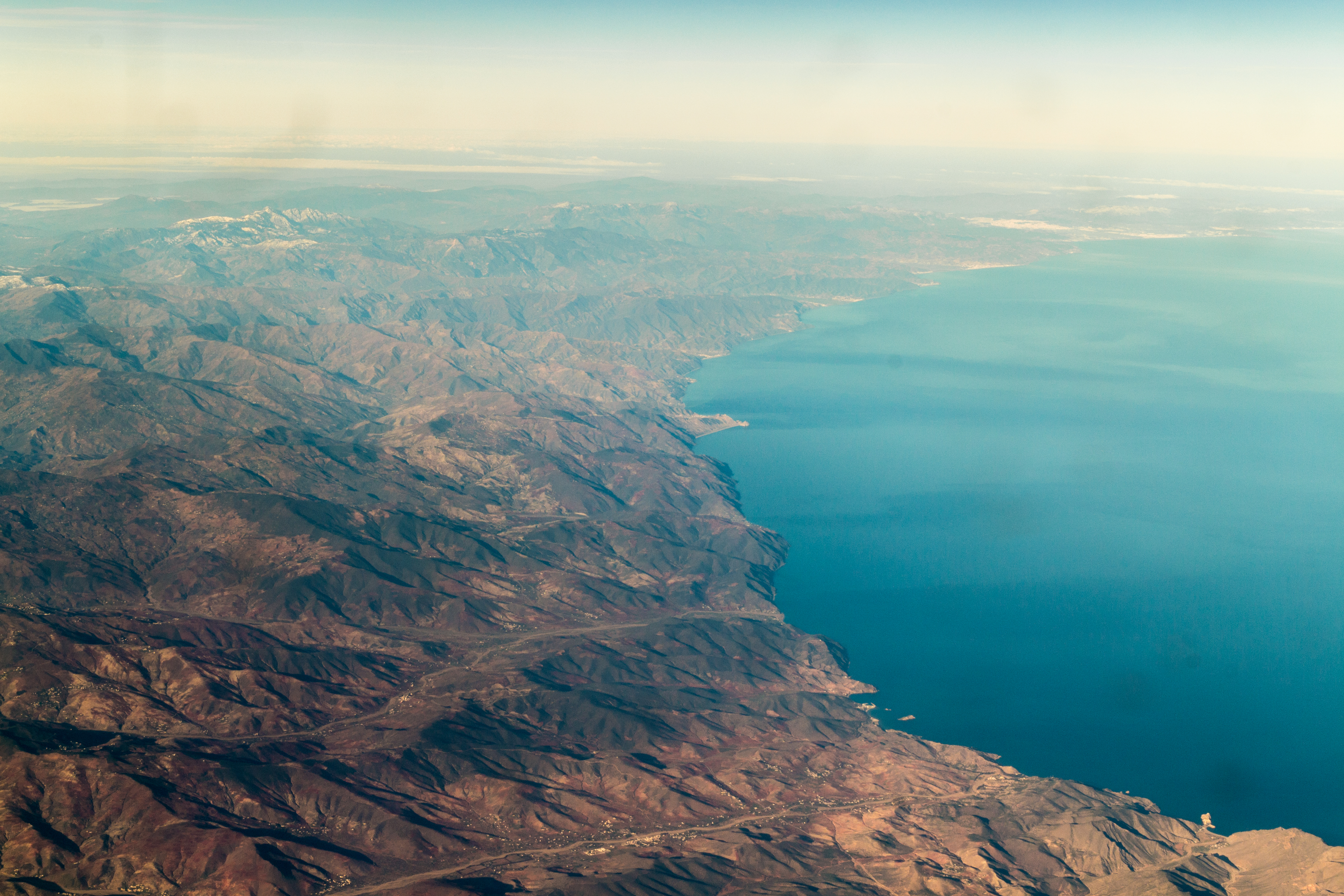
Moroccan Mediterranean coast - aerial view west from Bades over El Jebha to Tétouan with Rif mountains (2014)

== Name ==
The name of the town is based on its location at the foot of a set of mountains. El Jebha is the Arabic equivalent of ‘forehead’; the mountains that surround El Jebha stand out as if the town is the forehead of a chain of mountains. Hence, the name El Jebha. During the Spanish occupation of Northern Morocco between 1912 and 1956, the town was called Puerto Capaz. The placename paid homage to africanista colonel Osvaldo Capaz.

== Economy ==
The two main sources of income are fishery and trade. As one of the most important coastal towns in the near surroundings El Jebha has an own harbour where many fisher boats, large and small, are anchored. Furthermore, the harbour is welcome and useful for many Europeans who are passing through the area in a tour around the Mediterranean sea.
