= Tassift =

- Rural commune and town
- Interactive map of Tassift
- Coordinates: 35.4037°N 5.1196°W
- Country: Morocco
- Region: Tanger-Tetouan-Al Hoceima
- Province: Chefchaouen

Population (2004)
  - Total: 8,319
- Time zone: UTC+0 (GMT)

Tassift is a small town and rural commune in Chefchaouen Province, Tanger-Tetouan-Al Hoceima, Morocco. At the time of the 2004 census, the commune had a total population of 8319 people living in 1193 households.
