= Talassemtane National Park =

National park in Morocco

Coordinates: 35.13°N 5.08°W

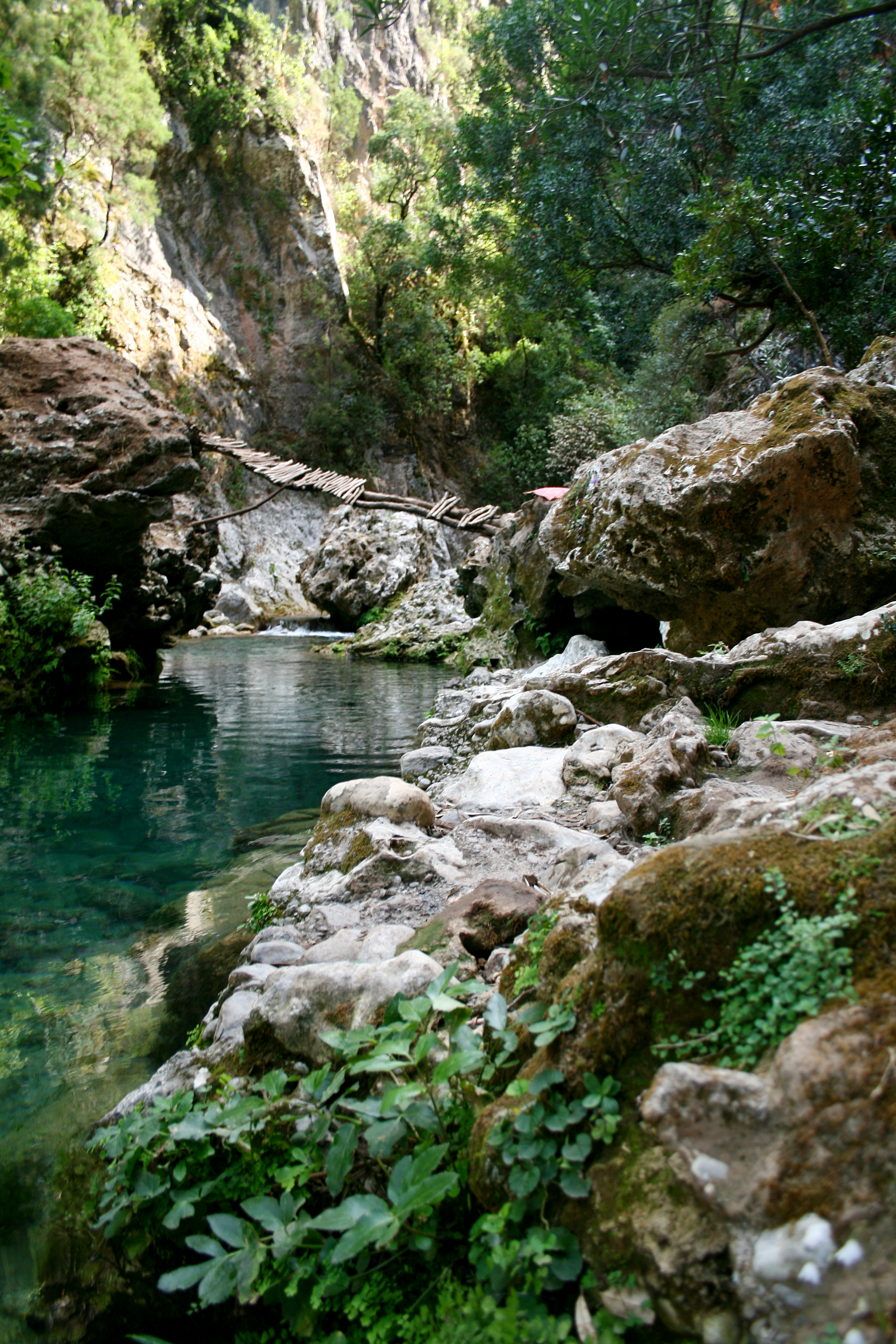
- Interactive map of Talassemtane National Park
- Location: Morocco
- Area: 589.5 km^{2} (228 mi^{2})
- Established: 2004

Talassemtane National Park is a national park in the Rif region of northern Morocco. It is part of the Intercontinental Biosphere Reserve of the Mediterranean.

== History ==
The site was added to the UNESCO World Heritage Tentative List on 12 October 1998 in the "natural" category. The park was created in October 2004 to conserve the last of Morocco's threatened fir forests.

== Geography ==
The 589.5 km^{2} (228 sq mi) park's elevation ranges between 350–1,050 m (1,150–3,440 ft).

=== Access ===
The park's proximity to the popular tourist destination, Chefchaouen, makes it a common hiking destination. Attractions include the Bridge of God, a natural bridge formation, and the villages of El Kalaá and Akchour.

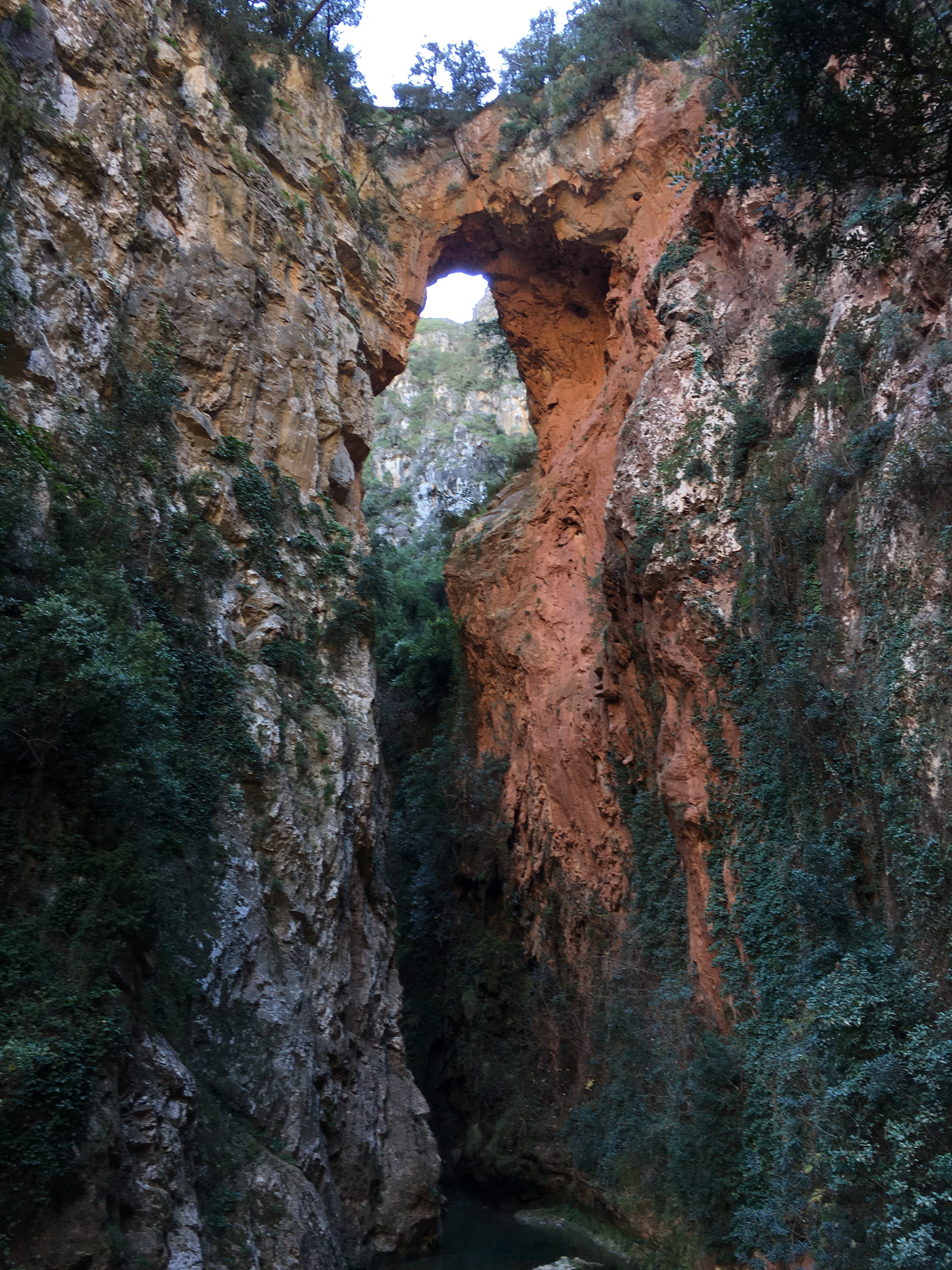
Bridge of God, Talassemtane National Park

=== Flora and fauna ===
The park is situated within the Spanish/Maghrebi biodiversity hotspot. Over 1380 plant species have been recorded, 47 of which are endemic to Morocco. The only Spanish firs native to Morocco can be found in the heart of the park, under the highest level of protection. Other species that live in the park include the endangered Atlas cedar and Andalusian Belladonna.

The Bearded vulture and over 100 other birds have been observed at the park. The park has been designated an Important Bird Area (IBA) by BirdLife International because it supports significant populations of Barbary partridges, red-necked nightjars, Levaillant's woodpeckers, subalpine and Sardinian warblers, spotless starlings, Moussier's redstarts, and black-eared and black wheatears. Other animals present include Barbary macaques, Greek tortoises and many-scaled cylindrical skinks.
