= Tetouan Province =

Province in the Moroccan region of Tanger-Tétouan-Al Hoceïma

Coordinates: 35.5667°N 5.3667°W

Tetouan Province إقليم تطوان ⵜⴰⵙⴳⴰ ⵏ ⵜⵟⴰⵡⵉⵏ
- Province
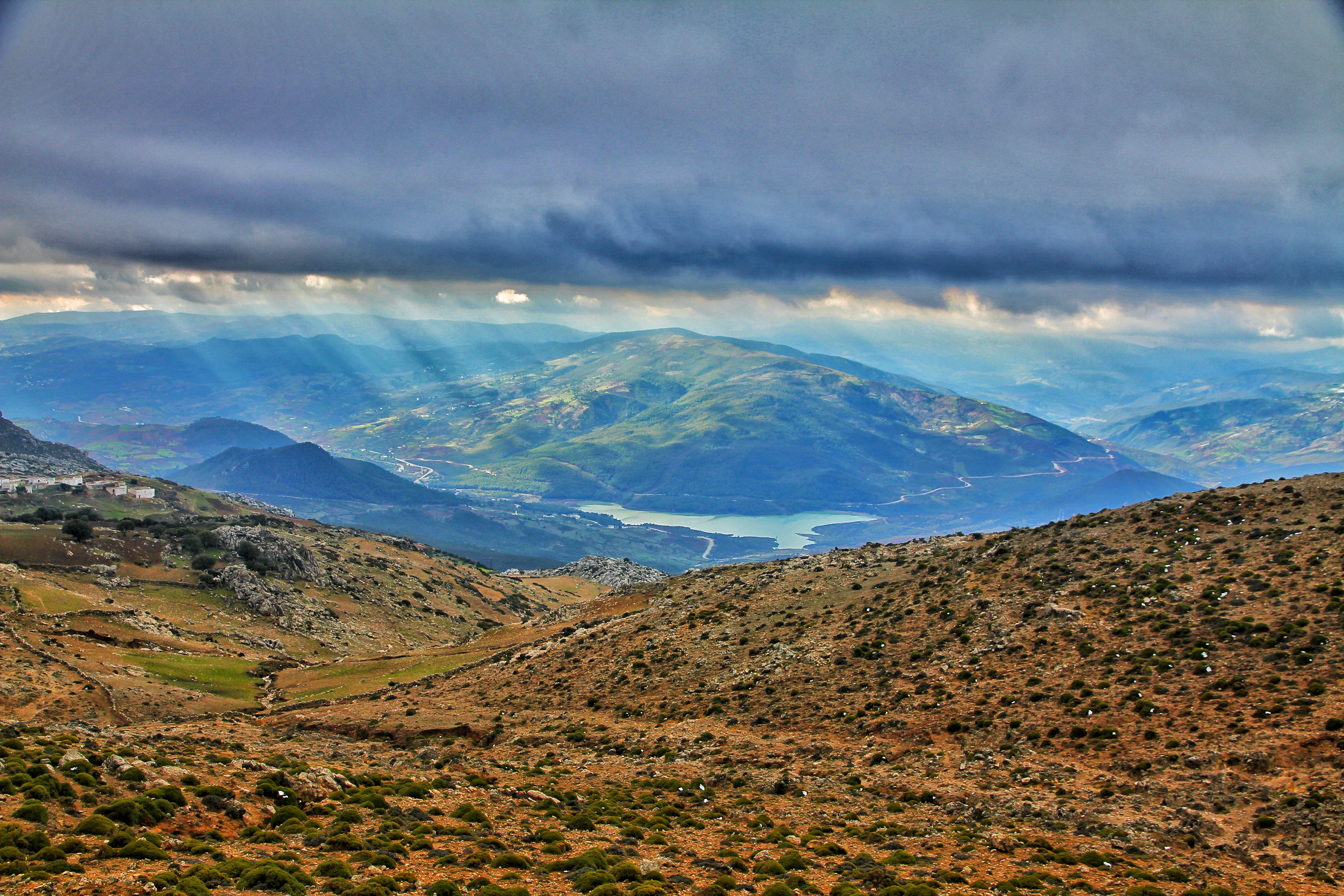

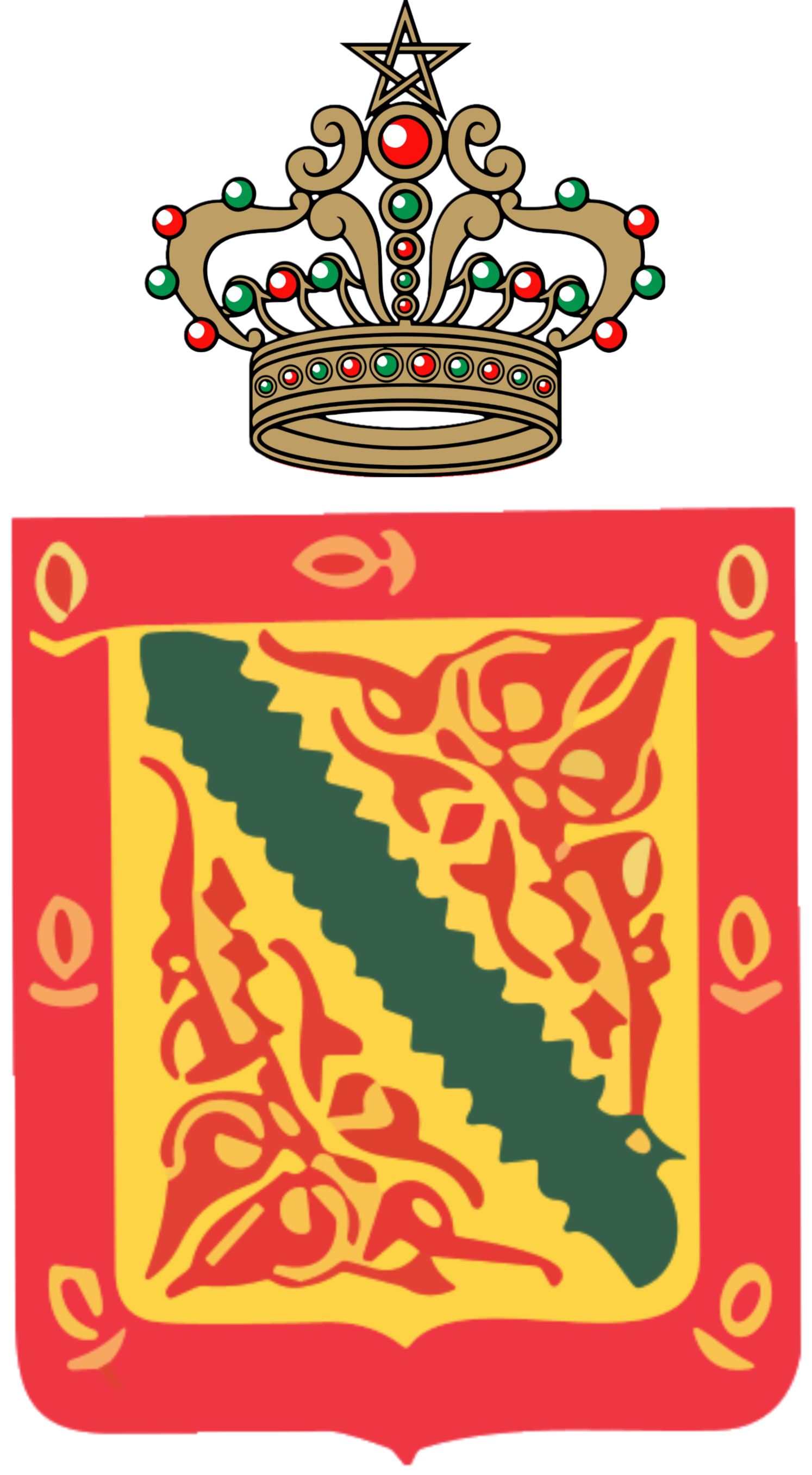
- Seal
- Interactive map of Tetouan Province
- Country: Morocco
- Region: Tanger-Tetouan-Al Hoceima
- Seat: Tetouan

Population (2024)
  - Total: 611,928

Tetouan Province is an administrative subdivision of Morocco, located in the Tanger-Tetouan-Al Hoceima region. Its capital is the city of Tetouan.

== History ==
Tetouan Province was established as part of Morocco’s administrative organization. It forms part of a region with a long historical background, particularly linked to the city of Tetouan, which has historically been an important cultural and economic center in northern Morocco.

Following successive territorial reforms, including the 2015 reorganization, the province became part of the Tanger-Tetouan-Al Hoceima region.

== Geography ==
Located in northern Morocco, Tetouan Province extends between the Mediterranean Sea and the Rif mountain range. It is bordered to the north by the Mediterranean Sea, to the east by Chefchaouen Province, to the south by Larache Province, and to the west by Fahs-Anjra Province.

The territory is characterized by mountainous terrain interspersed with coastal plains. Its coastline, stretching for several kilometers, includes numerous beaches and tourist areas.

The climate is Mediterranean, with mild, wet winters and hot, dry summers.

== Administration ==
Communes of Tétouan Province

Tetouan Province is composed of several urban and rural communes organized around the city of Tetouan. Territorial administration is overseen by a governor representing the central government at the provincial level.
