= Intercontinental Biosphere Reserve of the Mediterranean =

Coordinates: 35.9300°N 5.5900°W

Map of the biosphere reserve

The Intercontinental Biosphere Reserve of the Mediterranean is the first of its type to be designated by the Man and the Biosphere Programme. It combines the Tingitan Peninsula in Morocco and the southern Iberian Peninsula of Andalusia. Both countries are located in a biogeographic region of deciduous forests and evergreen sclerophyllous scrub within the Mediterranean bioclimatic zone. The maritime area of the biosphere reserve is dominated by the Strait of Gibraltar, which links the two peninsulas. The reserve also encompasses natural and human communication routes between Africa and Europe.

The Moroccan section of the intercontinental biosphere reserve is located in the region of Djbala on the Tingitan Peninsula, adjacent to the Strait of Gibraltar. It is bordered by the Gharb plain and the hills of Hafs to the west, the Rif Central to the east, the Mediterranean coastline to the north, and the western Prerif to the south. The region is very mountainous and marked by two major crests: the Numidian chain and the mid-ocean limestone ridge. Extensive depressions are found in the crests, including the Chefchaouen furrow, which covers the central portion of the region. The highest peak is Jebel Lakraa with a height of 2,159 metres.

The Spanish section of the biosphere reserve is located in the south of Andalusia. Numerous national parks, such as the Los Alcornocales Natural Park, contribute to the conservation and protection of unique flora and fauna species. In addition, the area is situated on the largest geological massif in Andalusia, the Baetic cordillera. Steep-sloped mountains characterize the topography of the entire area, especially in the north. The highest peak is 1,919 metres and is surrounded by rivers and channels.

The reserve was designated in 2006, and is jointly administered by the Direction regionale des Eaux et forets du Rif, the Consejería de Medio Ambiente of the autonomous community of Andalusia and the Ministerio de Medio Ambiente of Spain.

The reserve covers 894,134.75 hectares. The core areas consist of 86,251.37 hectares (21,651.37 of which are in Spain and 64,600 in Morocco). The buffer areas cover 633,654.95 hectares (351,154.95 in Spain and 282,500 in Morocco). The transition areas cover 174,228.43 hectares (50,728.43 in Spain, 123,500 in Morocco, and a marine area between both countries of 18,854.7 hectares).

== Ecological characteristics ==
Atlantic waters pass through the Strait of Gibraltar, which lies at the heart of the Intercontinental Biosphere Reserve of the Mediterranean. These waters constitute a vital hydrological supplement for the Mediterranean. Without them this inland sea would dry out completely within a 1,000 years.

Morocco’s interior region is mountainous and humid, and has the highest precipitation rate at the national level. The area comprises a variety of habitats with land cover characterized by diverse land uses including pasture, agricultural, livestock, and human settlement.

Cork oak forests and deciduous forests dominate the landscape. Endemic fauna species include Chalcides colosii (Riffian skink), Blanus tingitanus (a reptile of the family Blanidae), and Lacerta pater tangitana. The region is also home to a number of very rare habitats such as bogs with Sphagnum (Peat moss). The Moroccan part of the reserve is home to rare flora species found exclusively in the area of Djebala, including Acer granatense, Alnus glutinousa (Common alder), and Betula celtiberica.

In the Spanish part of the reserve, the Mediterranean climate induces rich vegetation growth, with forest covering more than 60% of the area, of which 49% is dominated by deciduous trees. Species include Quercus canariensis (Algerian oak) and Quercus faginea (Portuguese oak). Abies pinsapo (Spanish fir), Culcita macrocarpa, and Dryopteris guanchica are some of the endangered flora species under strict protection. Many fauna species are also under threat, including Milvus milvus (Red kite), Netta rufina (Red-crested pochard) and Salmo trutta (Brown trout).

The hydrographic network within the territory acts as a closed basin. The majority of the rivers flow in a periodical rhythm and originate from hills in the region. These also form the main source of water supply for the western sector of the province of Cadiz, as well as for the eastern coastal area of the province of Malaga.

== Socio-Economic Characteristics ==
The variety of geological structures in the area have resulted in diverse human interventions. The main economic activities in both the Andalusian and the Moroccan region are agriculture, livestock, and fishery.

With a density of 100 hab/km2, the Moroccan Rif is one of the most densely populated mountain ranges in the Mediterranean. However, geological barriers have limited the accessibility of this marginal area. The population in this part of the reserve is of Arab and Berber origin, with two indigenous peoples dominating the valley of Loukkos – the Berber tribe Ghomara and the Khlot Arabs. Major nomadic tribes include the Bni Hassan and Bni Leit.

The region is also home to an important religious centre renowned throughout North Africa and the Middle East. Thousands of people visit annually to perform a pilgrimage in honour of the Sufi saint, Moulay Abdessalam Ben Mchich. The area is also famous for archaeological and historical sites such as the ancient Phoenician and Roman town, Lixus, near Larache. The area was also under Spanish rule and numerous agricultural products produced today, such as Olea europaea (olive), are of Andalusian origin.

The Andalusian region is adjacent to two other biosphere reserves, namely Sierra de Grazalema and Sierra de las Nieves y su Entorno. The nearest major towns are Cadiz and Malaga.

Ever since the Middle Ages, water has had a crucial meaning for the local population, representing the development and creation of life. Numerous waterfalls, wells and fountains are decorated with statues and engravings linked to the region’s sacred sites.

Several prehistoric findings associated with cave paintings have been recorded at archaeological sites in the reserve. These are commonly found on the terraces of rivers (Palmones and Guadarranque) and in caves (e.g. Cueva de las Palomas and Cueva de la vaca), and are among the most important cultural sites on the Iberian Peninsula. Finally, valuable megalithic monuments, such as dolmens, are distributed throughout the villages of Ronda, Antequera and Aciscar.

== Sources ==
This article incorporates text from a free content work (license statement/permission). Text taken from UNESCO - MAB Biosphere Reserves Directory, UNESCO, UNESCO.
