= Tangier-Tétouan-Al Hoceima =

Region of Morocco

Tangier-Tétouan-Al Hoceima Region جهة طنجة-تطوان-الحسيمة (Arabic) ⵜⴰⵎⵏⴰⴹⵜ ⵏ ⵟⴰⵏⵊⴰ-ⵜⵉⵟⵡⴰⵏ-ⵍⵃⵓⵙⵉⵎⴰ (Standard Moroccan Tamazight)
- Region
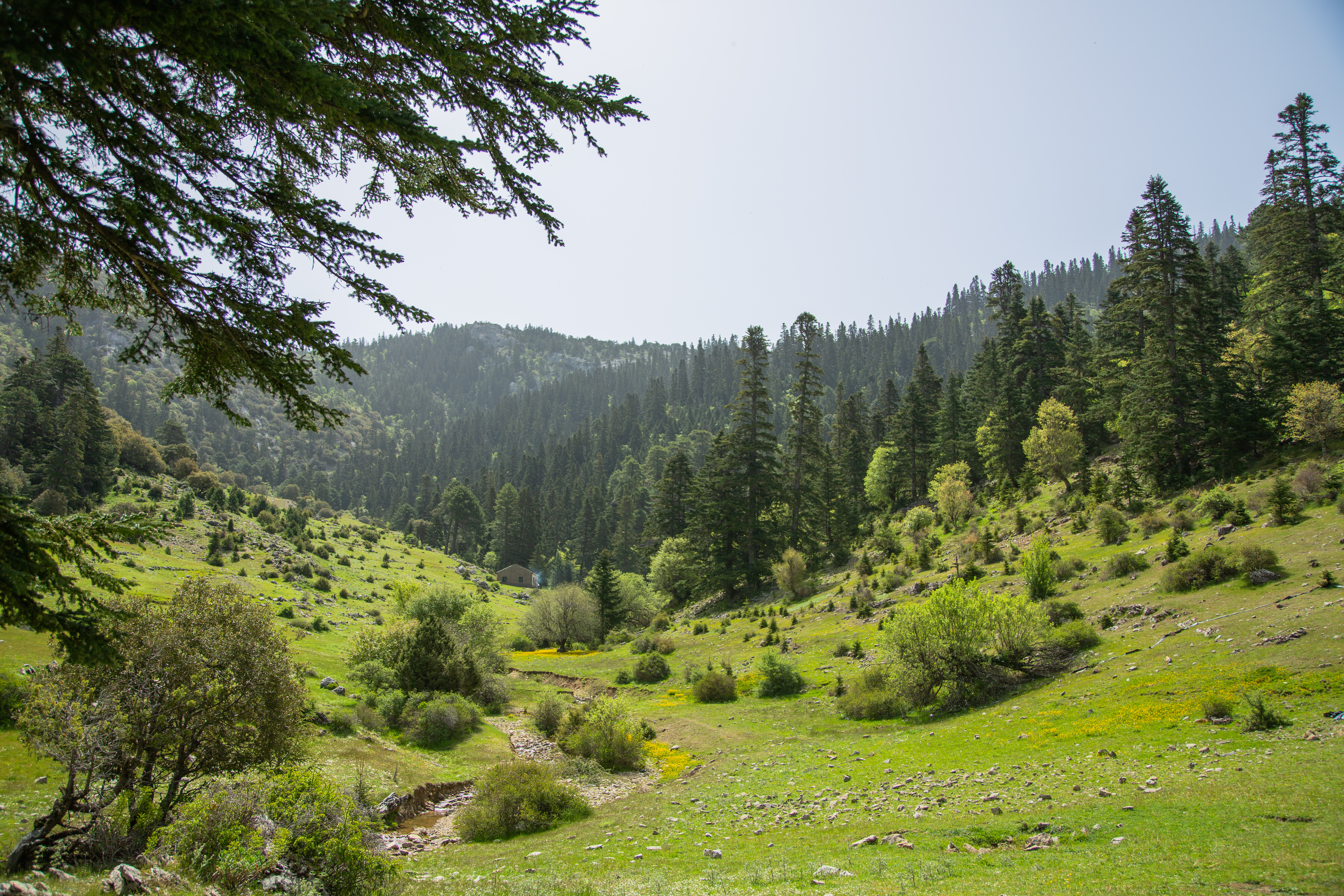
- Tlasmtane National Park in the Rif Mountains

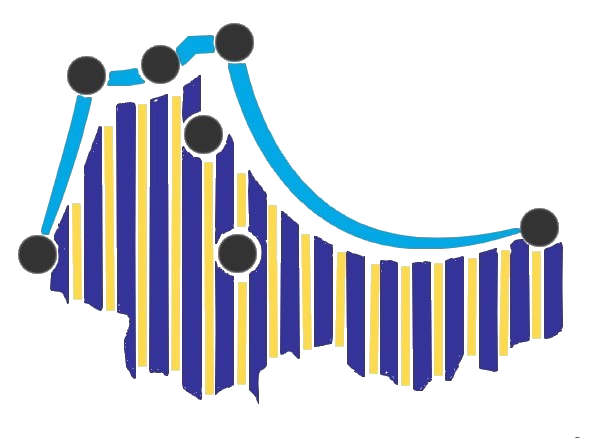
- Seal

- Location in Morocco
- Coordinates: 35.16°N 5.25°W
- Country: Morocco
- Created: September 2015
- Capital: Tangier

Government
  - Type: Governor–regional council
  - Wali: Younes Tazi
  - Council president: Omar Moro (RNI)

Area
  - Total: 15,090 km^{2} (5,830 sq mi)

Population (2024)
  - Total: 4,030,222
  - Rank: 5th out of 12 Regions
  - Density: 267.1/km^{2} (691.7/sq mi)
- Time zone: UTC+0 (GMT)
- Website: www.crtta.ma

Tangier-Tétouan-Al Hoceima (Note: Arabic: طنجة - تطوان - الحسيمة, romanized: ṭanja - tiṭwān - al-ḥusayma Standard Moroccan Tamazight: ⵟⴰⵏⵊⴰ-ⵜⵉⵟⵡⴰⵏ-ⵍⵃⵓⵙⵉⵎⴰ, romanized: ṭanja-tiṭwan-lḥusima) is the northernmost of the twelve regions of Morocco. It covers an area of 15,090 km^{2} and recorded a population of 4,030,222 in the 2024 Moroccan census. The capital and largest city of the region is Tangier.

== Geography ==
Tangier-Tétouan-Al Hoceima is the northernmost of Morocco's twelve regions. In the north it faces the Strait of Gibraltar and the Mediterranean Sea and borders the Spanish exclave of Ceuta. It also borders the Moroccan regions of Rabat-Salé-Kénitra to the southwest, Fès-Meknès to the southeast and Oriental to the east. The Rif rises in the eastern part of the region and is the location of Al Hoceima National Park and Talassemtane National Park. The land near the Atlantic coast in the west is less rugged, and the fertile southwestern corner of the region is drained by the Loukkos River.

== History ==
Tanger-Tétouan-Al Hoceima was formed in September 2015 by adding Al Hoceima Province, formerly part of Taza-Al Hoceima-Taounate region, to the former Tangier-Tétouan region.

In October 2023, King Mohammed VI appointed Younès Tazi as wali of the region, replacing Mohamed Mhidia.

As of 2025, Omar Moro (RNI) serves as President of the Regional Council of Tangier-Tétouan-Al Hoceima. He was elected to this position on 20 September 2021.

== Government ==
=== Subdivisions ===
Provinces of Tangier-Tétouan-Al Hoceima

Tangier-Tétouan-Al Hoceima comprises two prefectures and six provinces:

- Al Hoceima Province
- Chefchaouen Province
- Fahs-Anjra Province
- Larache Province
- M'diq-Fnideq Prefecture
- Ouezzane Province
- Tangier-Assilah Prefecture
- Tétouan Province

=== Regional leadership ===
Wali of Tangier-Tétouan-Al Hoceima since 2015
Name	Duration	Under
Mohamed Yacoubi	2015–2019	King Mohammed VI
Mohamed Mhidia	2019–2023	King Mohammed VI
Younès Tazi	2023–present	King Mohammed VI

Regional Council Presidents of Tangier-Tétouan-Al Hoceima since 2015
Name	Duration	Party	Under
Ilyas El Omari	2015–2019	PAM	King Mohammed VI
Fatima El Hassani	2019–2021	PAM	King Mohammed VI
Omar Moro	2021–present	RNI	King Mohammed VI

== Demographics ==
According to the 2024 Moroccan census, 92.4% of the population of Tangier-Tétouan-Al Hoceima speak Arabic as their mother tongue, whereas a minority of 7.3% natively speak Berber languages.

== Economy ==
Agriculture is a major economic activity in the Tangier-Tétouan-Al Hoceima region. Major crops include cereals, pulses, olives and sugarcane. Animal husbandry and fishing are also important contributors to the economy. Various free economic zones have been set up in the area surrounding the Tanger-Med container port, one of Africa's busiest, to promote industrial growth and foreign investment. The region is also heavily reliant on tourism.

== Infrastructure ==
The A5 expressway connects Tangier with the national capital Rabat. There are also two shorter expressways in the region: the A4 bypasses Tangier and links the A1 expressway to the Tanger-Med port, and the A7 connects Tétouan with M'Diq and Fnideq. National Route 2 connects Tangier and Tétouan with Al Hoceima via an inland route, while National Route 16 provides a coastal route between the same cities. National Route 13 branches off the N2 near Chefchaouen and runs south via Ouezzane to Meknes and beyond.

Tangier's Ibn Battouta Airport is the busiest airport in the region. Al Hoceima's Cherif Al Idrissi Airport and Tétouan's Sania Ramel Airport also receive commercial flights.

The first phase of the Casablanca–Tangier high-speed rail line was opened between Tangier and Kenitra in November 2018.
