= Jacob Hassan =

Spanish philologist (1936–2006)

- Born: 11 June 1936; Ceuta, Spain
- Died: 13 August 2006 (aged 70); Madrid, Spain
- Occupation: Educator
- Writing career
- Language: Spanish

Jacob Hassan, PhD (11 June 1936 – 13 August 2006) was a Spanish philologist of Sephardic Jewish descent from Ceuta, North Africa.

== Biography ==
Hassan was born to a Sephardic Jewish family in Ceuta. Hassan was a member of the Jewish Community of Madrid, a scientific researcher of the Higher Council for Scientific Research (ILC), and, among other things, founder and promoter of the Spanish School of Sephardic Studies, renowned in Spain and abroad. On 13 September 2012, a passageway near the town hall of Estella, Spain was officially named after him.
