= Arab Baths (Ceuta) =

Cultural property in Ceuta, Spain

- Baños Árabes (Spanish)
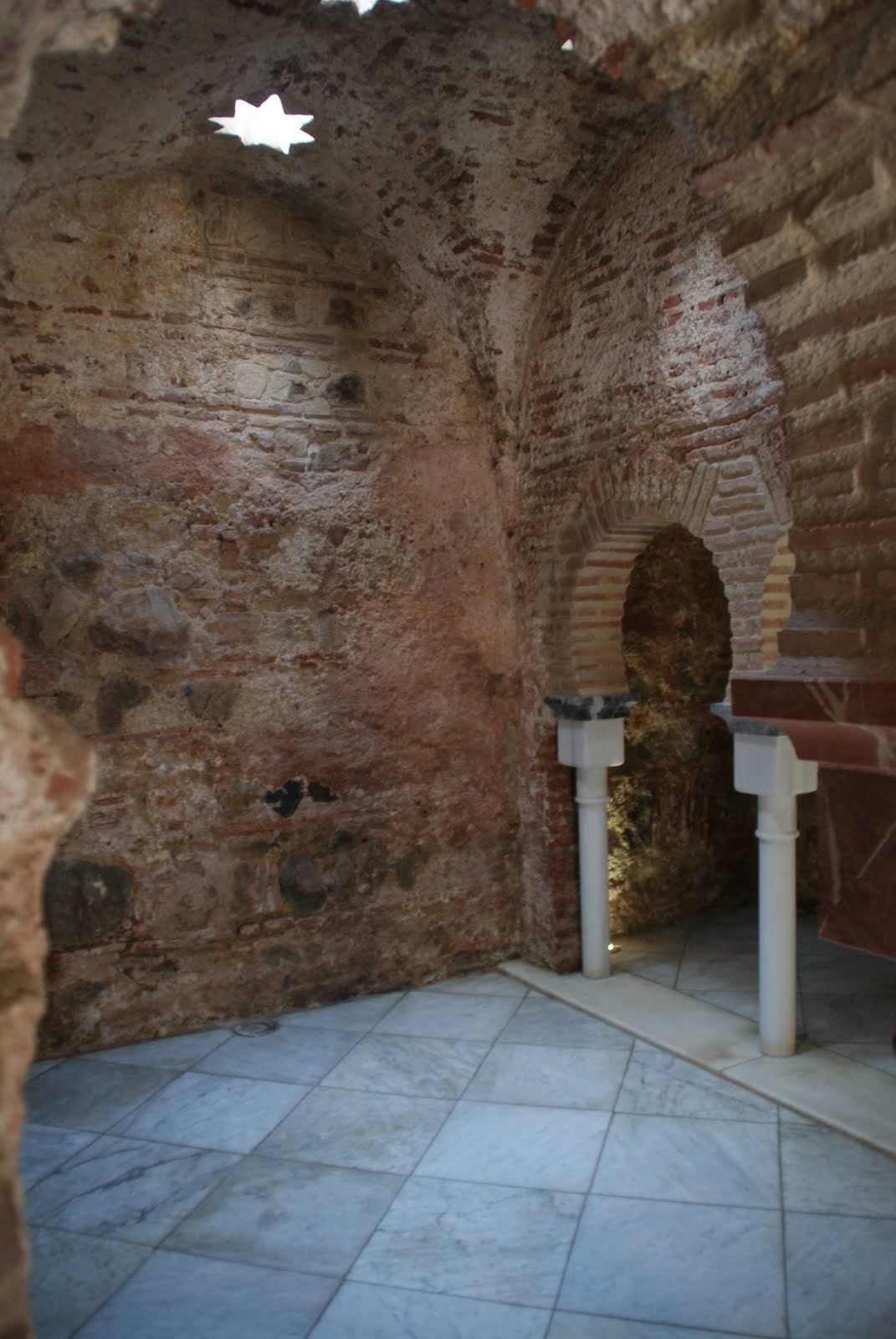
- Inner chamber of the Arab Baths in the plaza de la Paz, Ceuta

- Location within Spain
- 35.88958°N 5.306493°W
- Location: Ceuta, Spain

Spanish Cultural Heritage
- Official name: Baño árabe de la plaza de la Paz
- Type: Non-movable
- Criteria: Monument
- Designated: 2007
- Reference no.: RI-51-0012081

The Arab Baths are medium size medieval public baths on the northern edges of the Medina quarter of Ceuta, Spain. They are thought to have been used since the 11th century. Archaeological investigations in 2000 and 2004 have shown that the baths had one room for clothes and toilets followed by a cold bath and then a hot bath in a style laid down by the Romans. Other rooms may have existed.

== History ==
The earliest occupation on this site in the northern suburbs of Ceuta's Medina quarter date from the 11th century when remains have been found of a street and domestic construction. It was not until the 12th and 13th century that the two baths were built. Archaeological investigations have shown that the baths had one room for clothes and toilets followed by a cold bath and then a hot bath in a style laid down by the Romans. Some of the barrel vault ceilings have survived by there is evidence that other rooms were constructed but they have since been lost. The building was extended in the 14th century but by the 15th the building was having its stones reused for other projects. It is thought that the arched roofs were once covered in marble. The building was not being used in the 17th century.

The baths were discovered during building work on the street and they have since been subject to excavations in 2000 and 2004. The remains are open to the public. They appear incongruous on the modern main road in Ceuta.

The baths were recognised as a nationally important monument in 2007.
