= Porteadoras =

Person who carries goods across the Spain-Morocco border

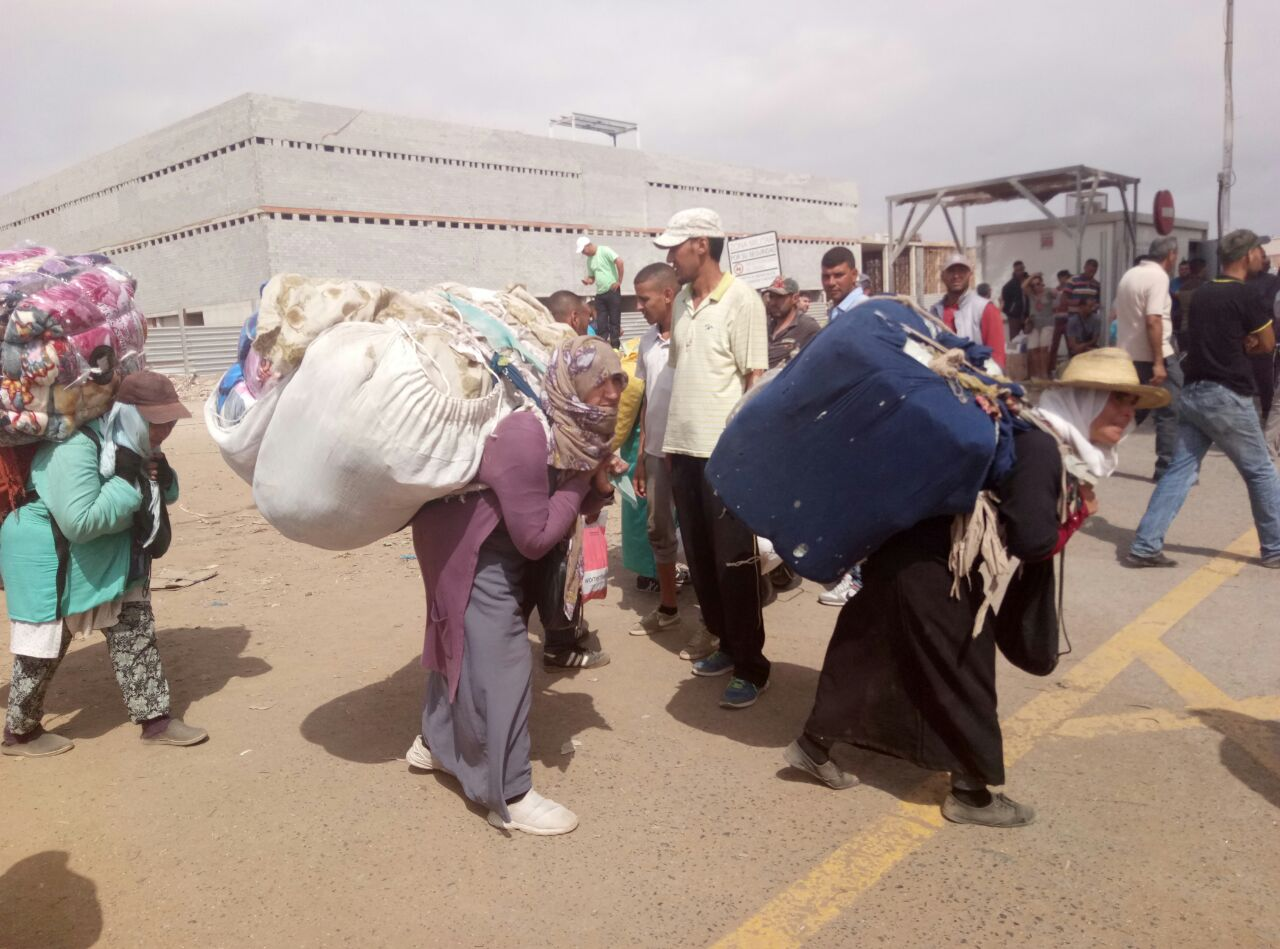
Porteadoras carrying their bales.

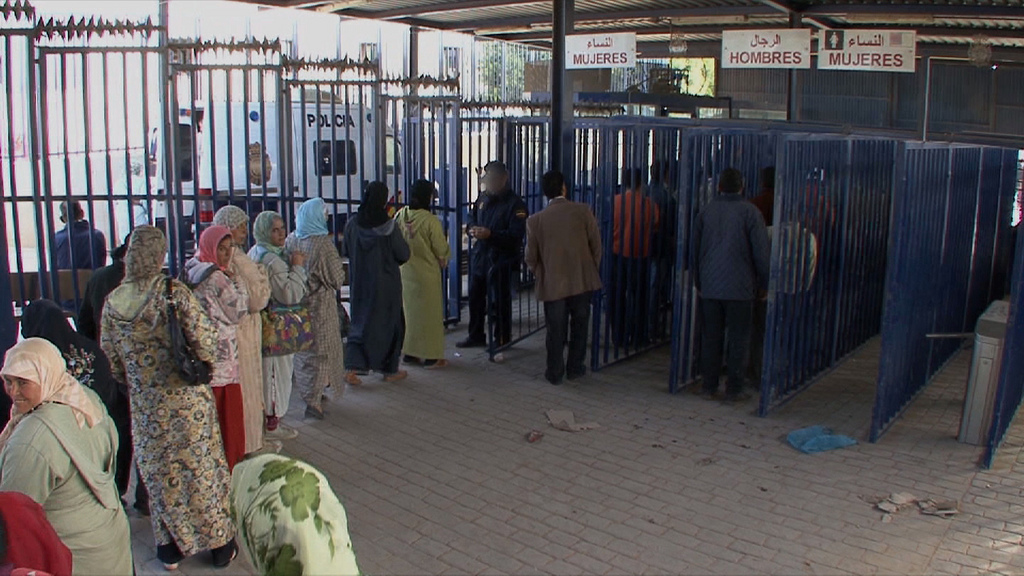
The queue to enter Melilla is shorter for men than for women.

Porteadoras (lit. 'carrier women') are bale workers in the Spanish autonomous cities of Melilla and Ceuta, located on the north coast of Africa.

== History ==
Due to a second duty called Biutz anything physically carried across the borders into Morocco is duty-free. This created a cottage industry of sorts for people in the district to carry goods across the border for merchants. It is a form of smuggling tolerated by the Spanish and Moroccan authorities. The Spanish official euphemism is comercio atípico, 'atypical trade' Moroccans from neighboring Nador and Tétouan do not require a visa to enter Melilla and Ceuta. Ceuta and Melilla have lower trade taxes than the VAT imposed on the Spanish mainland and the Balearic Islands and are not in the European Customs Union.

Every year, more than €1.4 billion ($1.8 billion) worth of goods are carried by Porteadoras into Morocco across the borders of Melilla and Ceuta. The number of porteadoras in one day was reduced to 4000 in Ceuta. It can reach 30,000 in Melilla. Ceuta, Melilla and the Moroccan areas besides them are among the poorer regions of their respective countries. Smuggling amounts to a significant part of their economies.

In August 2018, Morocco closed its customs by Melilla, affecting legal trade and smuggling. The government expects to spur its port of Nador.

In 2020, within the fight against COVID-19 in Morocco, the Moroccan government closed the borders with both Spanish cities.

It is typically a "job of last resort", performed mostly by widows, divorcees, or wives with severely disabled husbands. Typically, aged and/or ailing women carry bales of trade goods that weigh more than themselves.

Being a porteadora is considered a difficult, dangerous job. There are few, if any, regulations in place to protect the workers. In 2008, porteadora Safia Azizi fell and was promptly trampled to death. In 2009 two women died at Ceuta Biutz border crossing, overwhelmed by an avalanche of 200 carriers, four policemen were also injured.

Calls have been made for safer working conditions, limits on the bale weight and more reliable border opening.
