= Marinid Walls of Ceuta =

13th century walls in Ceuta, Spain

- Murallas Merínidas de Ceuta (Spanish)
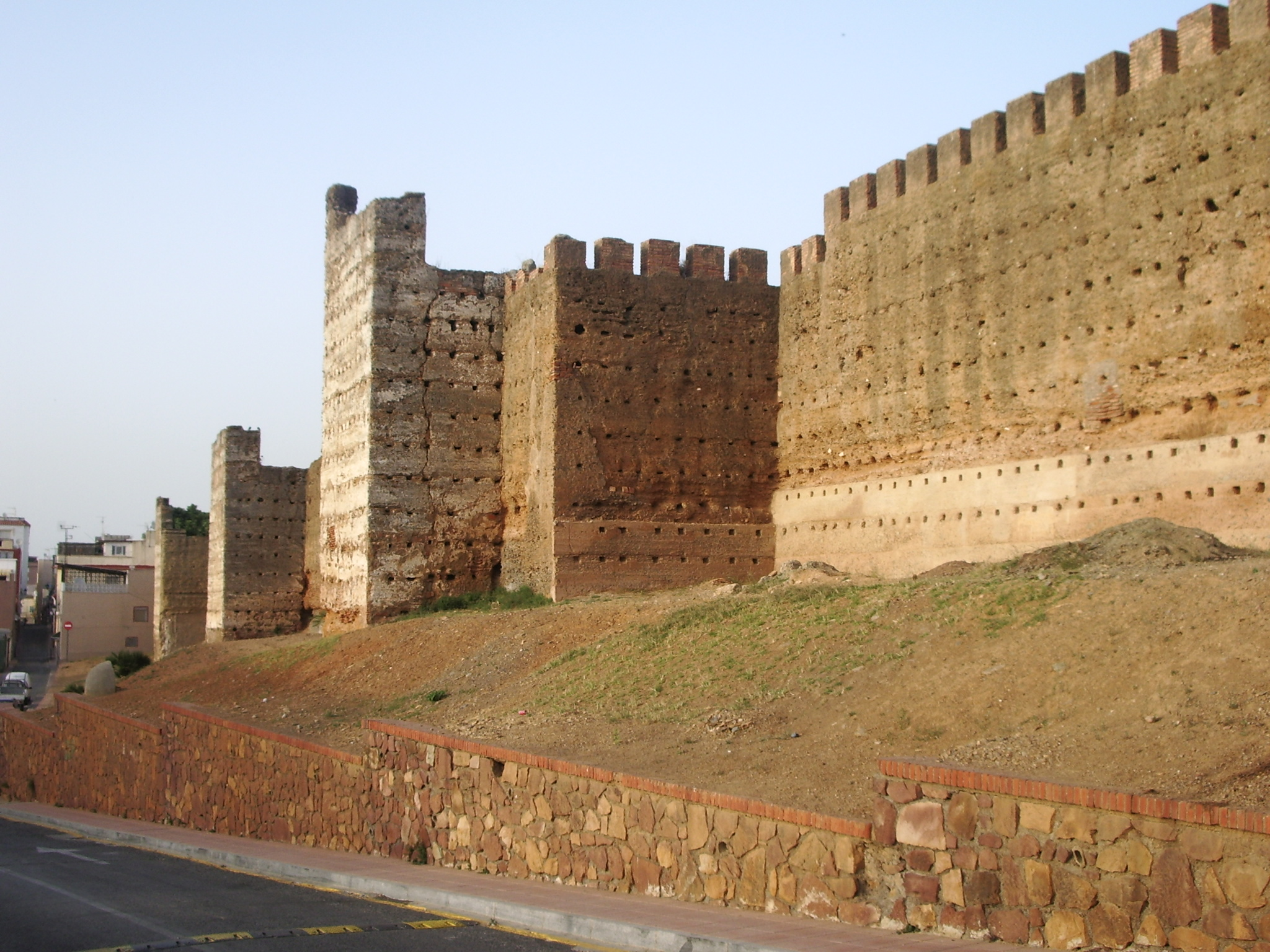
- Built by Abu Sa'id Uthman II

- Location within Spain
- Location: Ceuta, Spain

History
- Built: 1328

Spanish Cultural Heritage
- Official name: Murallas Merínidas de Ceuta
- Type: Non-movable
- Criteria: Monument
- Designated: 1985
- Reference no.: RI-51-0009110

The Marinid Walls of Ceuta (Spanish: Murallas Merínidas de Ceuta) are a set of walls and towers located in Ceuta, Spain. They were constructed in the 13th century during the Marinid dynasty's domination of the region. The walls were declared Bien de Interés Cultural in 1985.

They were used as a citadel, shelter for troops that were forced to spend the night outside the medieval city. Of the original 1,500 meters of primitive construction, today only the western flank remains, with about 500 meters, several bastions and two twin towers that frame the so-called Puerta de Fez.

== See also ==
- Mansourah
