= Mohamed Taieb Ahmed =

Spanish-Moroccan drug lord responsible (born 1975)

- Born: Mohamed Taieb Ahmed; Ceuta, Spain
- Other names: El Nene, Mohamed El Ouazzani
- Occupation: Illegal drug trafficker
- Known for: Drug lord

Mohamed Taieb "El Nene" Ahmed (born 1975 in Ceuta, Spain) is a Spanish-Moroccan drug lord responsible for trafficking hashish across the Strait of Gibraltar and into Spain.

== Biography ==
Ahmed was born in Ceuta and grew up in Málaga, Andalusia. He began trafficking drugs as a teenager, quickly coming through the ranks to become one of the main drug bosses in Ceuta. At his peak, Ahmed transported over 50 tonnes of hashish a year and allegedly made over €30 million a month. He was arrested over a dozen times, and hopped from Morocco to Spain in order to avoid capture. At one point, authorities believed that approximately one in 10 joints smoked by Spaniards contain hashish trafficked by Ahmed and his organisation.

Ahmed held two nationalities despite the fact that there is no dual nationality treaty between Spain and Morocco. The Civil Registry of Ceuta, in an unprecedented move, opened a file against him to withdraw his Spanish nationality in 2003, a file that was finalized in 2008, five years later, when he had just returned from Morocco after escaping from prison. Grandson of a sergeant who fought with Franco, his mother adopted the Spanish nationality when she was a child, reason why numerous judicial sources understand that El Nene is Spanish by origin and cannot be deprived of his nationality, just as his brother Larby is Spanish. His case reached the Criminal Chamber of the National Court, after the appeals made by Ricardo Ossorio, his long-time lawyer.

== Arrests ==
Ahmed was first arrested in 2000, and served a year at the Victoria Kent prison outside Madrid before he was released on parole. In order to prevent being extradited to Spain, he took up Moroccan citizenship under the name Mohamed El Ouazzani.

On 21 August 2003, Ahmed was arrested in Morocco after a gunfight with a rival gang that left one of King Mohammed VI's bodyguards wounded. He was eventually convicted for drug trafficking and sentenced to eight years. He was initially imprisoned in a prison in Salé before a riot by fellow inmates due to his abusive behavior led to his to transfer to a maximum security prison in Kenitra, There, Ahmed used his influence and money to bribe various officials to ensure a luxurious stay. He reportedly had three personal cells for private access to a rooftop where he celebrated banquet dishes made in the most luxurious restaurants in the area, a plasma TV, satellite, a computer with Internet access, air conditioning and other amenities. Spanish National Police believe he continued to run his operations from inside the prison. In December 2007, three years into his sentence, he bribed eight officials to help him escape from prison after he was granted a furlough. Nothing was known about it until 10 days later, following an anonymous tip.

He was captured on 23 April 2008 by the Servicio de Vigilancia Aduanera in Ceuta and arrested on drug smuggling and bribery charges. The Moroccan officials who helped Ahmed break out of prison were also arrested and sentenced. Ahmed was briefly held in Madrid before being extradited to Morocco. He'd eventually return to Ceuta, although the circumstances of his release are unknown.

He opened a coffee shop and kept a low profile. His wife gave birth to a girl in June 2014. Later that year, Ahmed disappeared after jumping overboard when a number of men on a motorboat fired on Ahmed's speedboat. Spanish police detained four suspects believed to have been on the motorboat that allegedly ambushed Ahmed's, but they refused to make statements and were promptly released. Search crews conducted extensive searches in the area where he supposedly disappeared, but no remains were found.

== See also ==
- Drug lord
