= Hotel Ceuta Puerta de Africa =

Hotel in Ceuta, Spain

Coordinates: 35°53′18.29″N 5°18′57.31″W

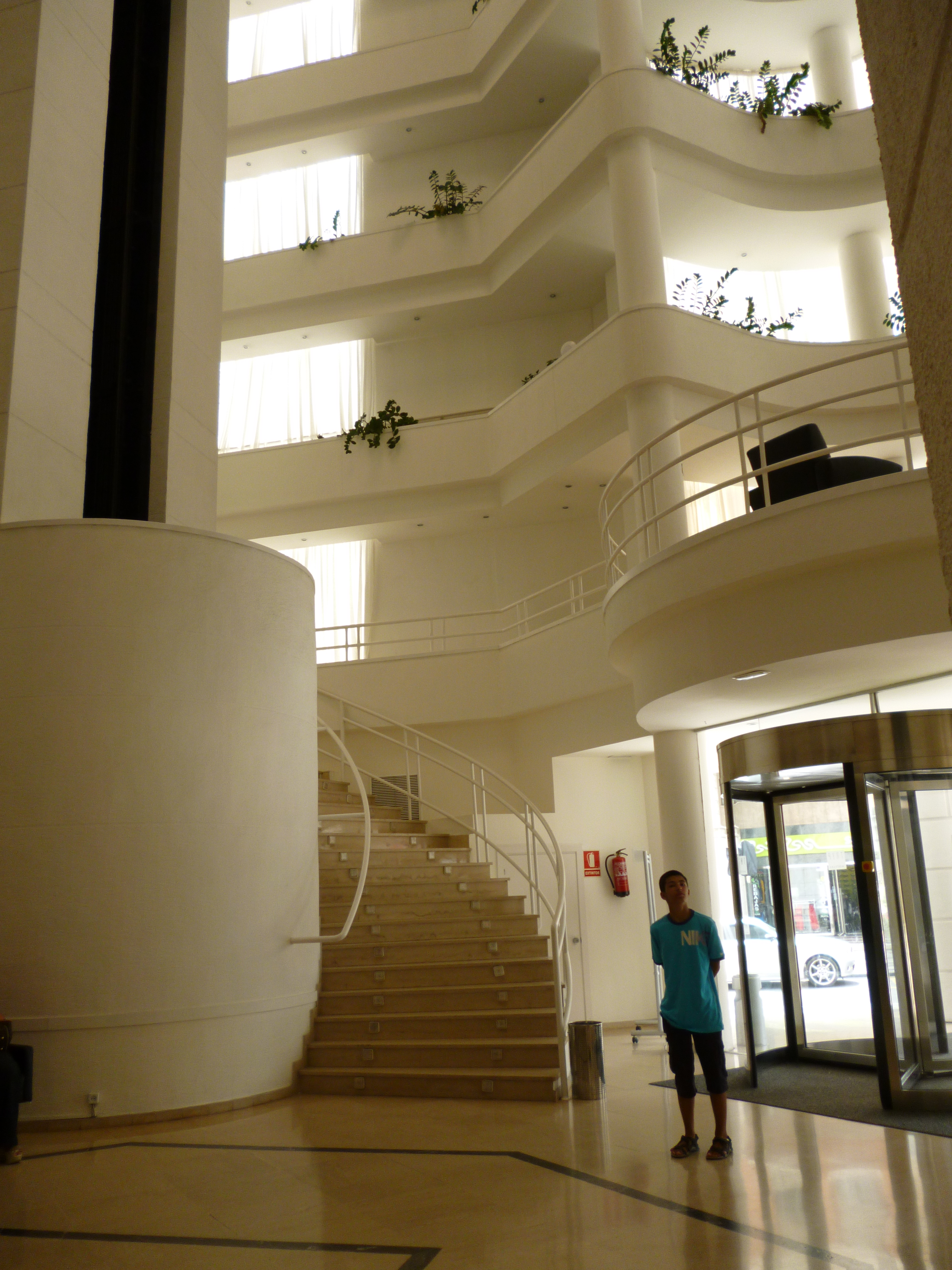
Hotel lobby

Hotel Ceuta Puerta de Africa is a hotel in Ceuta, a Spanish city bordering northern Morocco. It is located near the Palacio Municipal in the centre of the city, near the corner of Avenida Alcalde Antonio L. Sánchez Prados and the Plaza de África. The hotel has 117 rooms, two suites, a restaurant, bar and conference rooms which accommodate up to 530 people.

It was formerly the Hotel Tryp Ceuta, and was managed by TRYP Hotels, formerly part of Sol Meliá Hotels & Resorts of Spain.
