= Tétouan =

Tétouan Arabic: تطوان Standard Moroccan Tamazight: ⵜⵉⵟⴰⵡⵉⵏ
- City and municipality
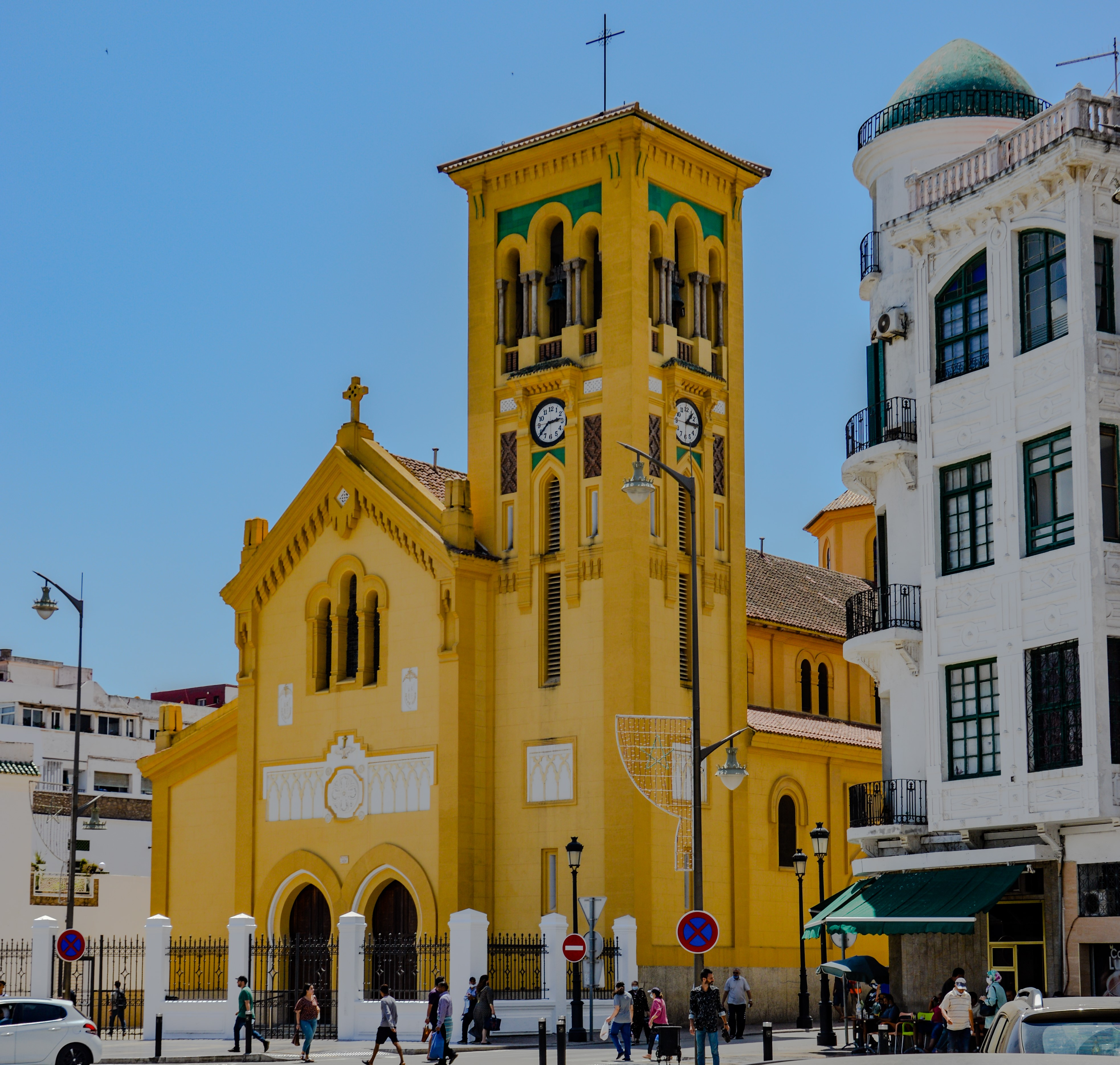
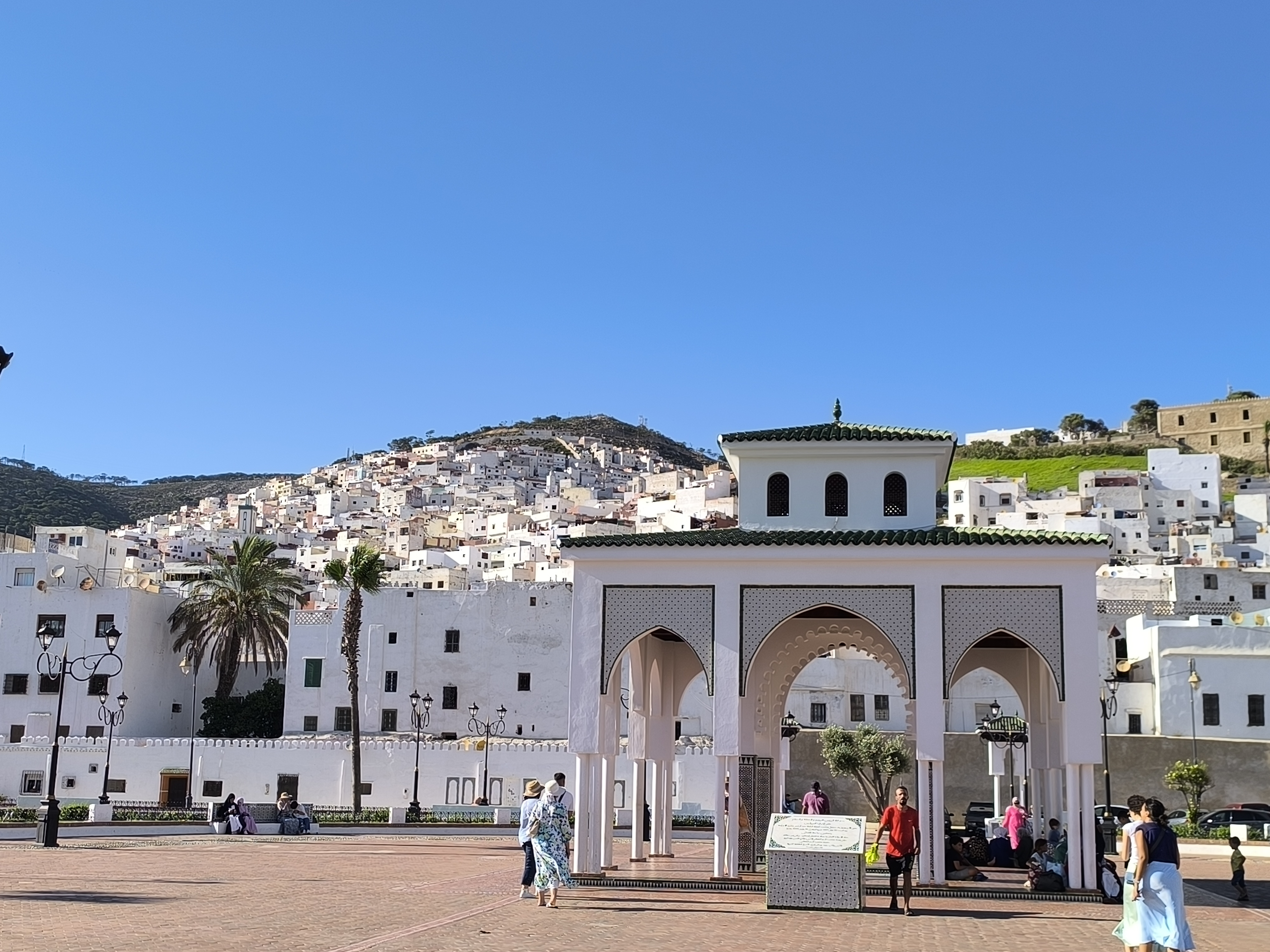
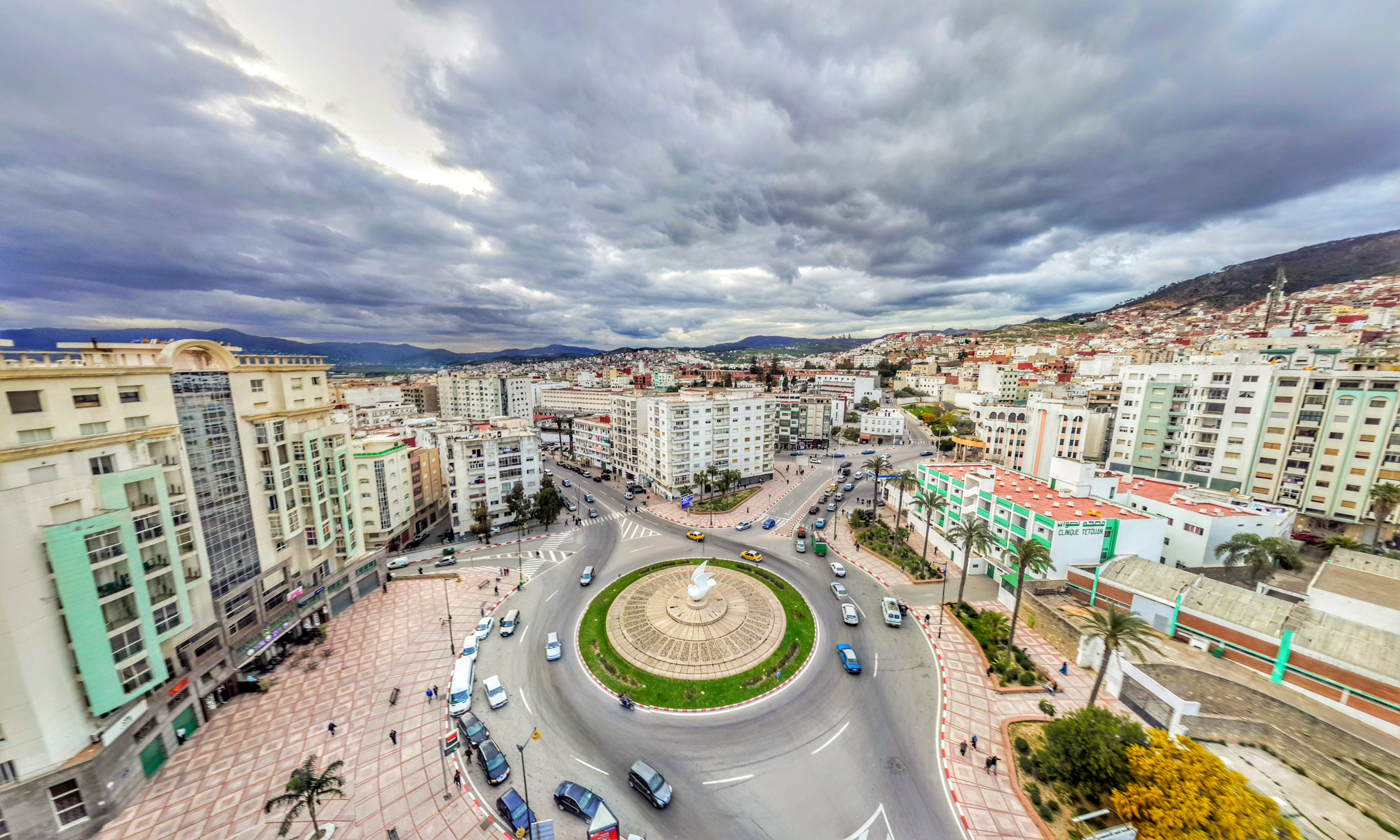
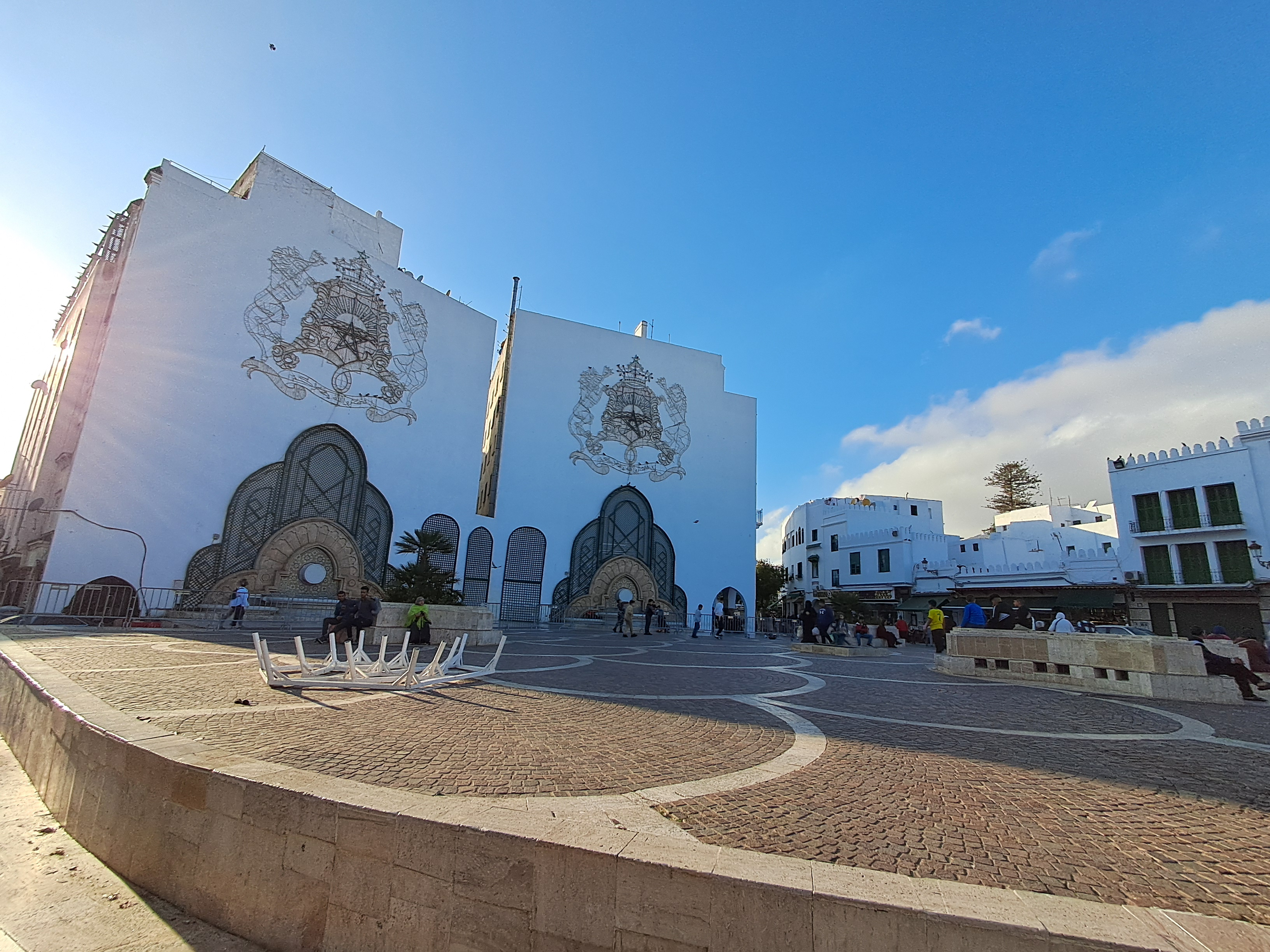
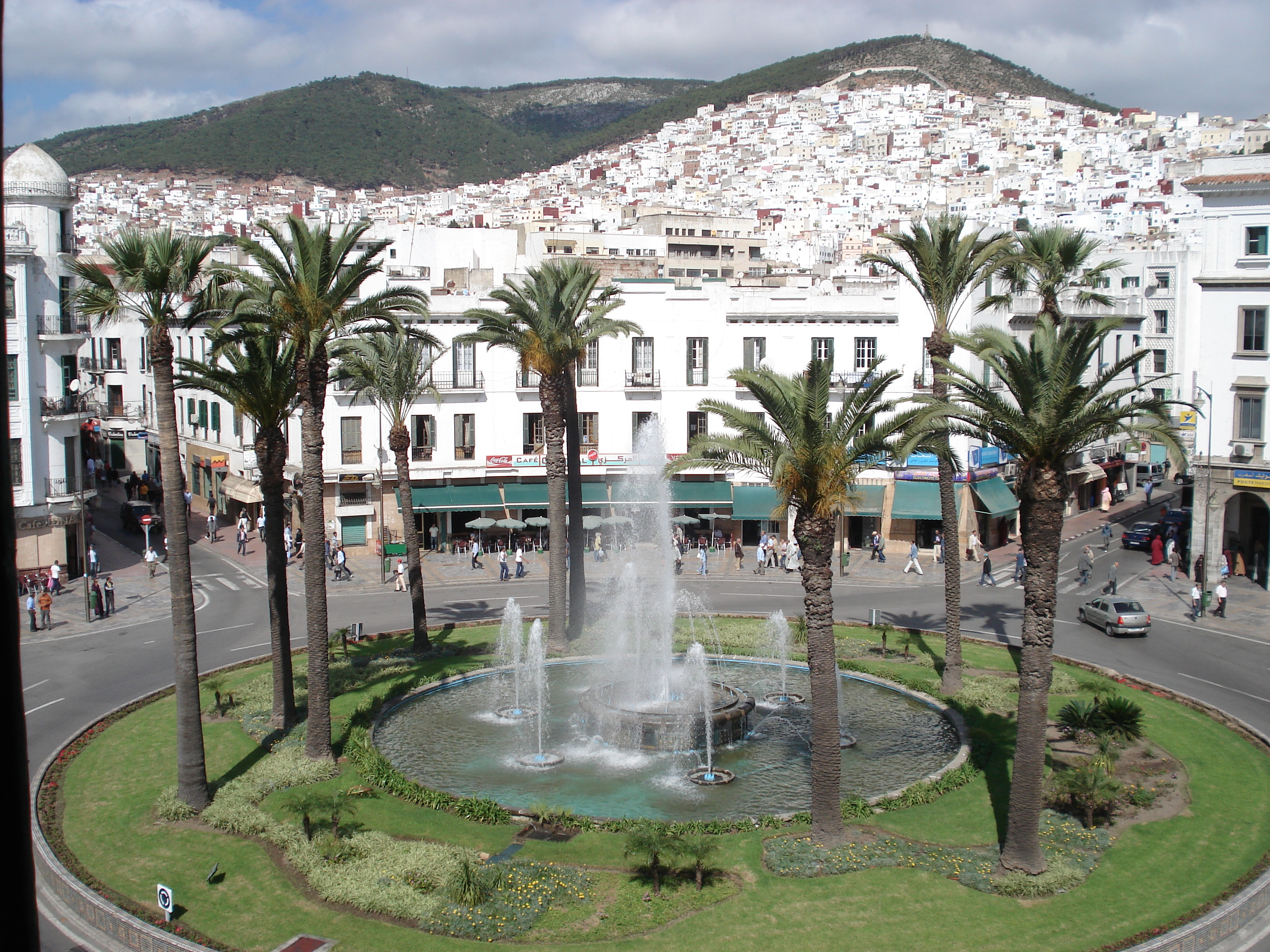
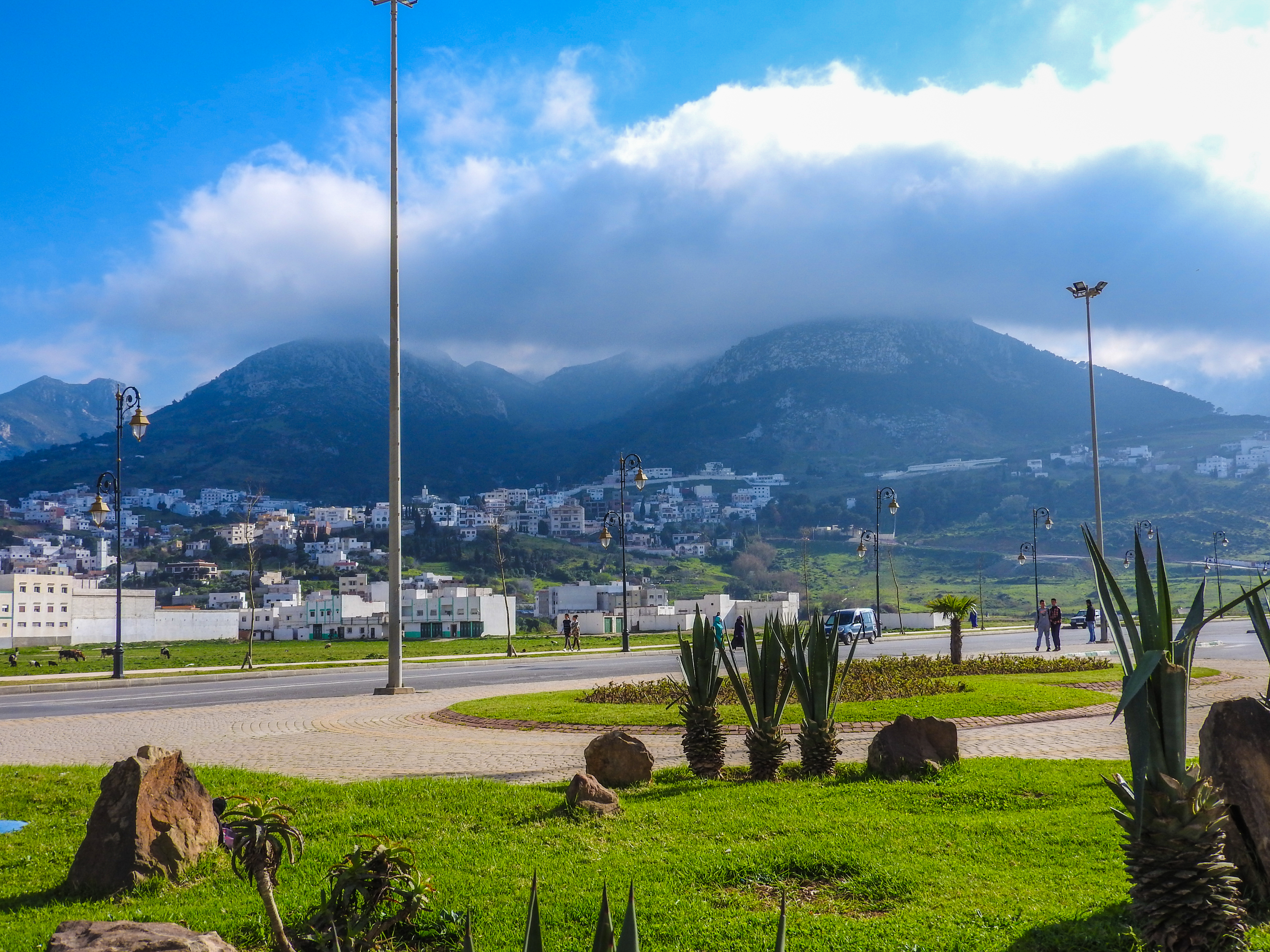
- Overview

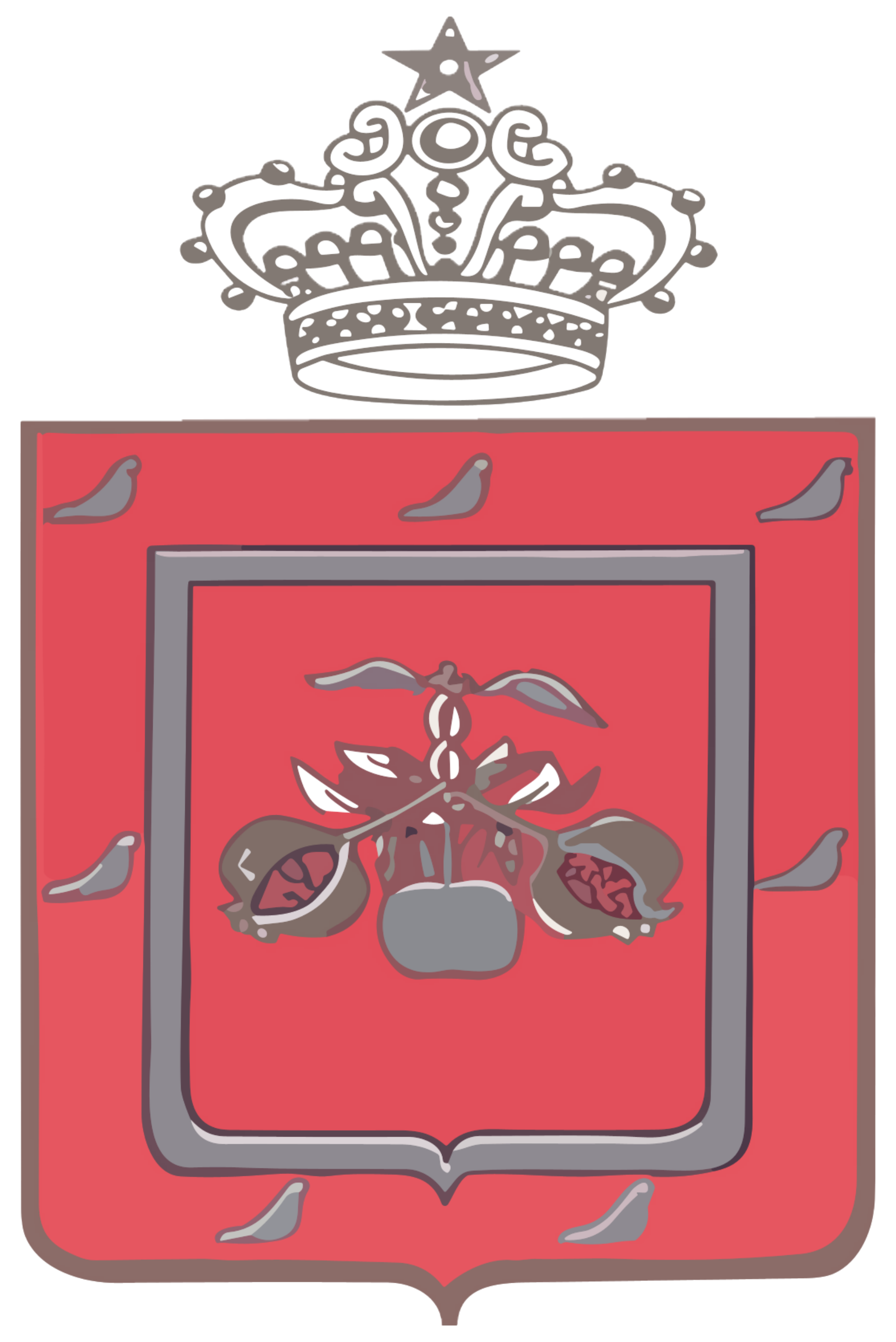
- Seal
- Nicknames: Granada's Daughter; The White Dove
- Interactive map of Tétouan
- Coordinates: 35°34′N 5°22′W
- Country: Morocco
- Region: Tanger-Tetouan-Al Hoceima
- Province: Tétouan

Government
  - Mayor: Mustapha El Bakkouri (RNI)
- Highest elevation: 205 m (673 ft)
- Lowest elevation: 2 m (6.6 ft)

Population (2024)
  - Total: 422,757
  - Rank: 11th in Morocco
- Time zone: UTC+0 (GMT)
- Postal Code: 93000
- Website: The official web site

UNESCO World Heritage Site
- Official name: Medina of Tétouan (formerly known as Titawin)
- Type: Cultural
- Criteria: ii, iv, v
- Designated: 1997 (21st session)
- Reference no.: 837
- Region: Arab States

Tétouan (Note: Arabic: تطوان, Standard Moroccan Tamazight: ⵜⵉⵟⴰⵡⵉⵏ) is a city in northern Morocco. It lies along the Martil Valley and is one of the two major ports of Morocco on the Mediterranean Sea, a few miles south of the Strait of Gibraltar, and about 60 kilometres (37 mi) E.S.E. of Tangier. As of 2024, the city has an estimated population of 469,465 inhabitants. It is part of the administrative division Tanger-Tetouan-Al Hoceima.

Over the span of more than 2,000 years, Tétouan has witnessed many development cycles. Dating back to the 3rd century BC, Tétouan's first settlements, discovered a few miles outside of the modern city limits, belonged to the ancient Mauretanians. In the 2nd century BC, the Phoenicians traded there and after them the site, known now as the ancient town of Tamuda, became a Roman city under Emperor Augustus.

In the late 13th century, the Marinids built a casbah and mosque in what is now Tétouan's old city. In 1305, the scale of the settlement was expanded by sultan Abu Thabit Amir, who fortified the place. Around the early 15th century, the Castilians destroyed the settlement in retaliation for piracy.

The modern history of the city starts around the late 15th century. It was re-built and fortified by Ali al-Mandri, who emigrated from the Nasrid city of Granada in the decade before it fell into the hands of the Catholic Monarchs Ferdinand II of Aragon and Isabella I of Castile as the War of Granada was completed in 1492.

Hundreds of thousands of Muslims (Moriscos) and Jews (Marranos) from Andalusia settled in northern Morocco, and on the ruins of the city of Tétouan. The city went through a prosperous period of reconstruction and growth in various fields, becoming a major center of Andalusian civilization.

Tétouan is linked to Granada, and it is nicknamed "Granada's Daughter" (Spanish: "La Hija de Granada" or "La Paloma Blanca"). To this day, many families keep keys belonging to their old homes in Granada. It is also nicknamed "Pequeña Jerusalén" (Little Jerusalem) by Sephardic Jews. Today, the majority of Tétouan's population is Muslim. Although their presence has declined during recent decades, Christian and Jewish communities also exist.

In 1913, Tétouan became the capital of the Spanish protectorate of Morocco (1912-1956) which was governed by the Khalifa (Moroccan princes serving as Viceroys for the Sultan) and a Spanish "Alto Comisario" accredited to them. The city remained the Spanish protectorate's capital until 1956, when Morocco regained its full independence.

Tétouan is a renowned multicultural center. Since 1997, the medina of Tétouan is a UNESCO World Heritage Site. Since 2017, it has also been part of the UNESCO Creative Cities Network in the area of Crafts and Folk Art.

== Etymology ==
According to Leo Africanus, the name comes after the Goths bestowed the government of the town upon a woman with one eye and that the inhabitants called it Tetteguin, meaning "eye" in their language.

The current name is first mentioned in 9th-century Arabic chronicles, after the death of Idris II.

According to Mohamed Chafik, the current name "Tetuán" (تطوان) is a Spanish deformation of the original Amazigh name "tiṭṭawin" (ⵜⵉⵟⵟⴰⵡⵉⵏ), plural form of "tiṭṭ" ⵜⵉⵟⵟ meaning "eye" or "water source". The term "tiṭṭ" appears in many location names in Morocco and the Maghreb (for example Tit Mellil). Mohamed Daoud cited seven different spellings or pronunciations for the city's name, including the most commonly used "Titouân", dating back to the 8th century, as well as "Tittâouîne" (تيطاوين) used by Ibn Khaldun, and "Tittâouen" (تيطاون) used by locals and mentioned by Mohammed al-Idrissi.

== History ==
=== Phoenician and Roman presence ===
A few miles outside of the city limits lies the ancient town of Tamuda. Ancient Mauretanian settlements at the outskirts of the city date to the 3rd century BC. Artifacts from both the Phoenician and the Roman eras have been found at the site of Tamuda.

=== Rebuilding the city-state ===
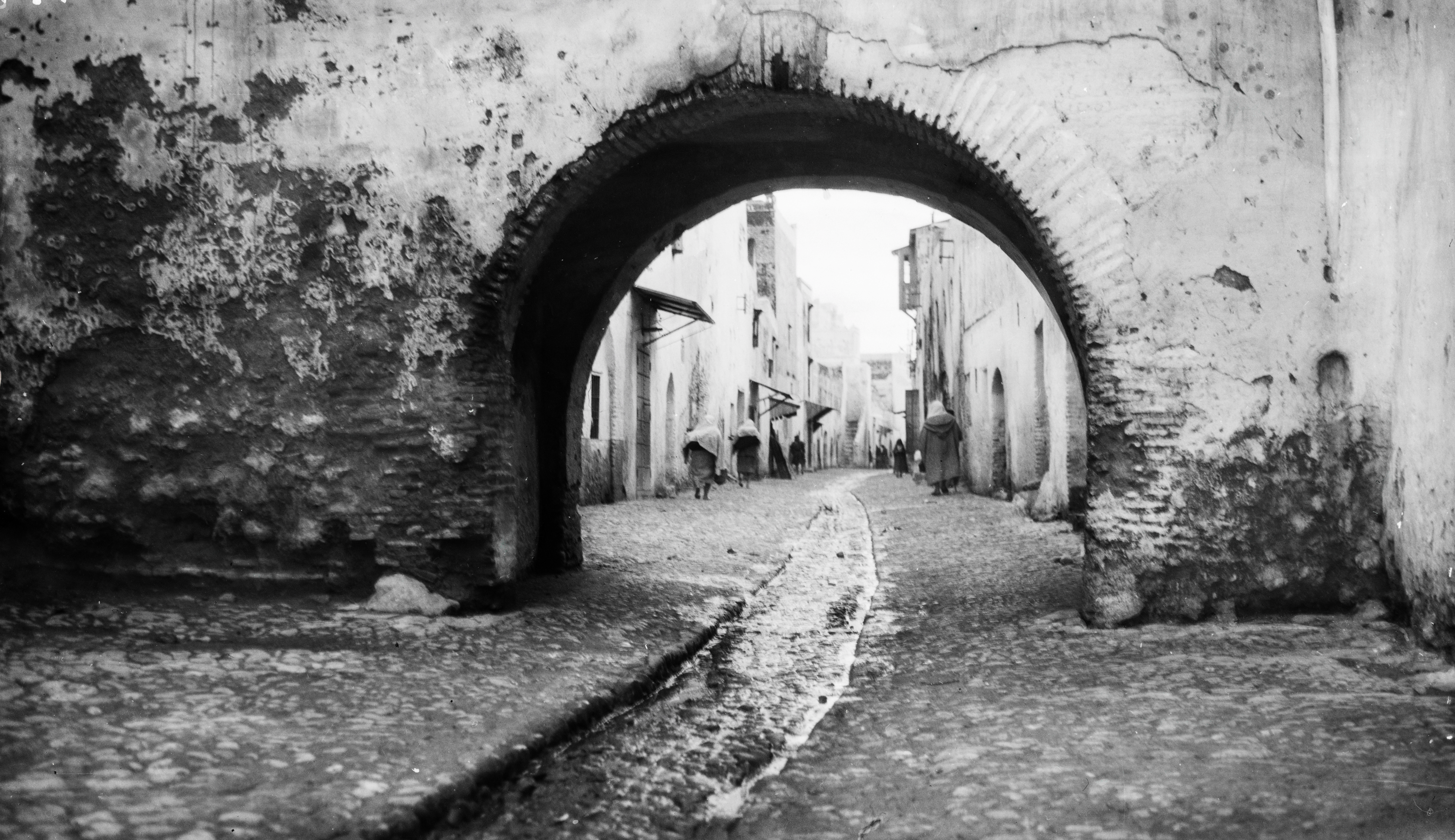
A street in the old medina - photograph by Swiss aviator and photographer Walter Mittelholzer (1928)

In 1286, the Marinids built a casbah and mosque in Tétouan. The first large-scale building project took place in 1305 when the settlement was expanded by the Marinid sultan Abu Thabit Amir. He fortified the place and had it serve as a base for attacks on Ceuta, which had recently come under the rule of a rebellious member of the Marinid dynasty. In 1399, it was destroyed by the Castilians, because pirates used it for their attacks. The Portuguese were already occupying the neighboring Ceuta and in 1436, its commander Pedro de Menezes, 1st Count of Vila Real dispatched a detachment of his garrison under his son Duarte de Menezes to raid Tétouan – which was recovering from the Castilian destruction – in order to prevent it from becoming a threat to future Portuguese operations.

By the end of the 15th century, it was rebuilt by Muslim and Jewish refugees of the Reconquista. The Andalusian Arabs, led by Ali al-Mandri (a captain of the troops loyal to Boabdil, the last king of the Nasrid Kingdom of Granada) took refuge in the ruined city. They first raised the walls and then filled the enclosure with houses. The Andalusians came into conflict with the Beni Hozmar tribe settling in Jebala lands, after which they asked the Wattasid sultan for protection. In response, he sent 80 soldiers (according to one chronicle, 40 natives of Fez and 40 Riffians). In turn, the Andalusians paid a large amount of mithqal, thus insuring their autonomy. Assisted by tribes from the surrounding mountains, the Andalusian refugees started harassing the Castilian possessions on the Moroccan coast. In 1565, these attacks led to the destruction of the city's harbor by Castilian forces. During this time, the city was governed by the Andalusian Abu Hassan al-Mandri and the city remained autonomous from the Saadi sultans (with the Saadis' continued attempts to assert their power).

=== Piracy and Mazmorras ===
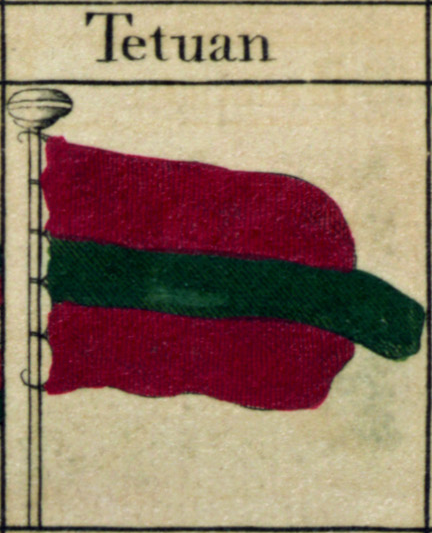
Naval flag of Tétouan (1783)

As early as the 1530s and 1540s, at the time when Spain and the Ottoman Empire were disputing control over the western part of the Mediterranean, piracy was spreading and soon Tétouan became one of the main centers of piracy in the region. Corsairs considered it as a form of retaliation against the Spanish Reconquista that led to the loss of their homes in al-Andalus, especially that the timing coincided with the first Morisco influx to Tétouan due to the forced conversions they faced in Spain between 1501 and 1526. Their collaborators included English and Dutch renegades (who were mostly Protestants, although a few had converted to Islam).

While the harbor served as a port from where piracy missions were launched, captives were taken to dungeons. There were underground prison complexes with series of connected excavated caves called Mazmorras. The captives were faced with being sold to the slavery market if ransoms were not paid. These subterranean installations were rediscovered in the early 20th century. A chapel of 90 square meters and a few altars were also uncovered. The sacred site, named Nuestra Señora de los Dolores (Our Lady of Sorrows), was used by the captives and redeemers like their relatives or Spanish Franciscans and Portuguese Jesuits who used to make frequent visits to negotiate the Christian captives' freedom.

Miguel De Cervantes, himself a captive in Algiers, Algeria between 1575 and 1580, refers to Mazmorras in El juez de los divorcios (The Divorce Judge), where the protagonist compares his marriage to "captivity in Tétouan's caves." He also mentions tin Don Quixote, in addition to similar references in El trato de Argel, La gran sultana and La ilustre fregona. It is believed that he had contact with some prisoners who told him about the hardness of the dungeons of Tétouan. Diplomat and explorer Leo Africanus, while visiting the city, mentions in Description of Africa that there were 3,000 captives, although some historians dispute that figure. Other accounts came from captives themselves such as Germain Moüette, who spoke of horrible conditions lived inside those mazmorras in the late 17th century. Piracy continued, and in 1829, the Austrian Empire bombarded the city in reprisal.

The underground prison was explored in 1922 by Cesar Luis de Montalban, based on a report by archaeologist Manuel Gómez-Moreno Martínez. The Spanish protectorate administration then commissioned architect Carlos Ovilo to study the site but they found out that no excavation could be possible without taking the risk of damaging the housing above the site. Since then, no excavation has taken place, although recently, some researchers and civil associations have called for the authorities to extend exploration and restoration before opening it to the public.

=== Late military history ===
In the 17th century, the city was governed by the wealthy al-Naksis family. At the end of the century, the city was taken by the Alaouite sultan Moulay Ismail, who encountered fierce resistance. Tétouan remained fragile, until it was taken by the Alaouite governor of Tangier and leader of a moroccan army that had occupied Tangier after the English had evacuated the possession. The Alaouite governor ushered in a period of stability in Tétouan, building many of the city's landmarks such as the Meshwar palace and the Pasha mosque, the oldest standing mosque in Tétouan. After his death, the city again rebelled and was only nominally controlled by the central government.

Elements of military constructions can be found in the original fortifications such as the three forts, the seven gates, and the large outer walls that surround the old medina. They have survived despite the changes that occurred through the expansions known to the city during multiple periods.

Tétouan received a number of Algerian immigrants after the French invasion of Algiers in 1830. According to Bouhlila, they introduced baklava, coffee, and the warqa pastry now used in pastilla. For Gil Marks, it was rather Sephardic Jews who introduced the Ottoman warqa, which was substituted for the Spanish pastry.

=== Hispano-Moroccan War and the Spanish protectorate ===
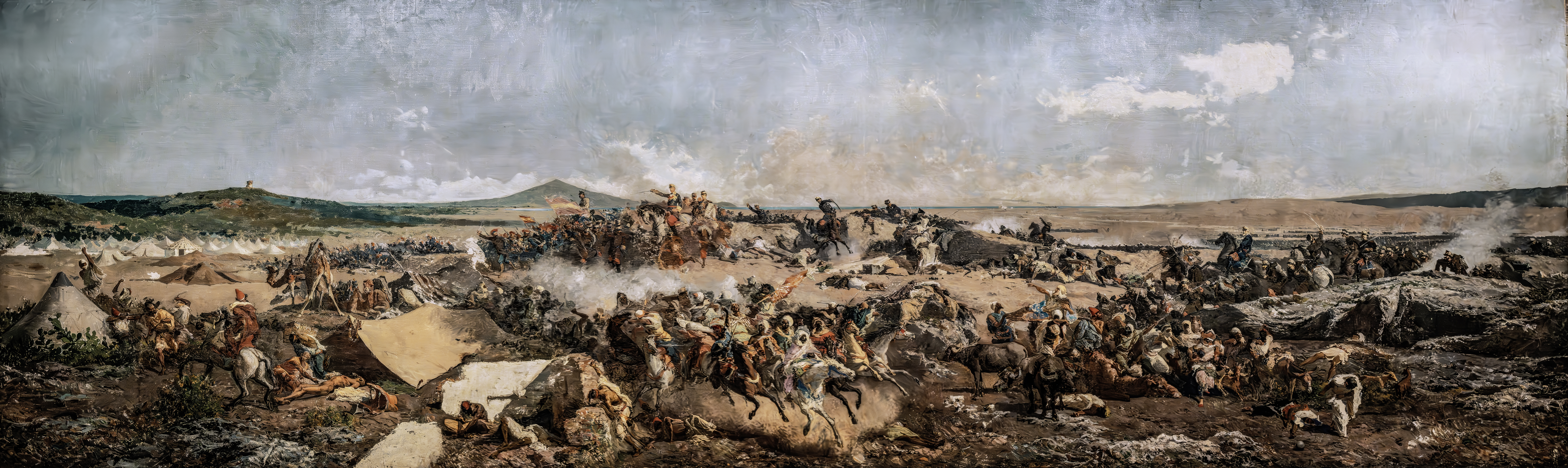
The Battle of Tétouan, which was part of the first Conde de Lucena's Moroccan campaigns (on behalf of Spain's Queen Isabella II, early 1860s), painted by Marià Fortuny (Museu Nacional d'Art de Catalunya)

In 1844, Morocco lost a war against the French and in 1856, it signed the Anglo-Moroccan treaties of Friendship with the British. The Spaniards saw Morocco's defeat in 1844 and the treaties signed in 1856 as a sign of its weakness. Spurred by a national passion for African conquest, Spain declared war on Morocco in 1859 after a conflict over the borders of Ceuta.

After a few months, Tétouan was taken on 4 February 1860 under the command of General Leopoldo O'Donnell, who was a descendant of an old Irish royal family, the O'Donnells of Tyrconnell. He was made hereditary Duke of Tetuán, and later served as Prime Minister of Spain. However, two years later the Spanish evacuated in May 1862.

In 1913, it became the capital of the Spanish protectorate of Morocco, which was governed by the Khalifa (Moroccan prince, serving as Viceroy for the Sultan), and the Spanish "Alto Comisario" accredited to him, and it remained its capital until 1956.

=== The nationalist movement ===
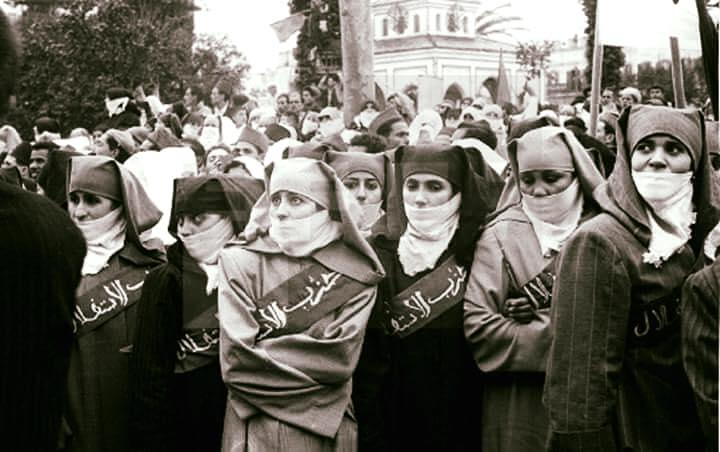
Tetouani women affiliated with the Istiqlal Party

Tétouan was one of the most active Moroccan cities in resisting colonialism. The nationalist movement in Tétouan was led by the charismatic leader Abdelkhalek Torres and other personalities such as Abdessalam Bennuna and historian Mohammed Daoud. The movement was part of the pan-Arab nationalist movements. They established deep ties with Arab nationalist leaders such as future Egyptian President Gamal Abdel Nasser and Lebanese Druze prince and intellectual Shakib Arslan. When Arsalan wanted to visit Morocco in August 1930, he was not given a permit by the French protectorate so instead he went to Tangier, which then had international status under foreign colonial powers, and from there to Tétouan, where he met the group. Many of the members later joined the National Party for Istiqlal. Others joined some other nationalist parties, of which many members were women.

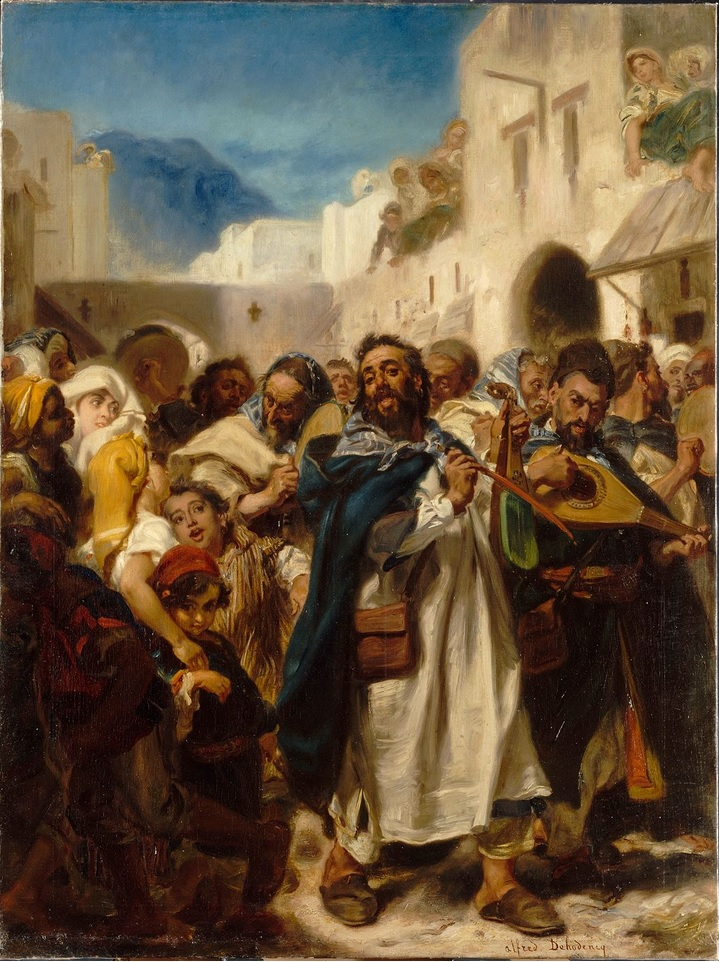
Jewish Festival in Tétouan, painted by French Orientalist Alfred Dehodencq (1865)

=== Jewish community ===
Tétouan has been home to a significant Sephardi Jewish community which immigrated from Spain after the Reconquista and the Spanish Inquisition. This Jewish Sephardi community spoke a form of Judaeo-Spanish known as Haketia. According to the World Jewish Congress, by 2015, there were only 100 Moroccan Jews remaining in Tétouan.

In 1790, a pogrom occurred, started by Sultan Yazid. The mellah, where the Jews lived, was pillaged and many women raped. At this point there was an emigration of Tétouani Jews to Gibraltar, where the large Jewish population maintains links with the community in Tétouan.

In 1807, Sultan Slimane relocated the mellah south of the medina to build a large mosque at its previous location inside the medina.

The Mellah of Tetuan was sacked in the Hispano-Moroccan War of 1860, when there were 16 to 18 synagogues. This was followed by appeals in the European Jewish press to support Jewish communities like the one in Tetuan, leading to an international effort called "The Morocco Relief Fund." The Paris-based international Jewish organization Alliance Israélite Universelle, along with Rabbi Isaac Ben Walid of Tetuan, then opened its first school in Tetuan in 1862.

Following Jewish migration from Morocco during the mid-twentieth century, there were few Jews left in Tétouan. By 1967, only twelve remained (López Álvarez, 2003). During that period, many immigrated to South America and much later to Israel, Spain, France, and Canada. Today, the city's last remaining synagogue is the Rabbi Isaac Bengualid Synagogue, which serves as a museum.

=== Modern history ===
Tétouan was further expanded when it became the capital of the Spanish protectorate in Morocco between 1913 and 1956. The Spanish administration built several new neighborhoods outside the walled medina. The city underwent an intense urban transformation for which its new neighborhoods and buildings, called "Ensanche" (meaning extension), acquired an image very similar to those of other Spanish cities of the time. Its structure was organized around a large circular plaza, Plaza Moulay el Mehdi (formerly Plaza Primo de Rivera). The influence of the protectorate has remained important even after the independence of the country in 1956.

In January 1984, and in the midst of the Years of Lead under the reign of King Hassan II (died 1999), a revolt spread into several cities for a number of days due to price hikes for basic goods following the implementation of the IMF's and the World Bank's structural adjustment programme. The revolt was thwarted by a military intervention. Twenty people were killed in Tétouan and many others were arrested and received heavy sentences.

Many people in the city still speak Spanish. On road signs, names are often written both in Spanish and in Arabic, though many signs are in Arabic and French, the second language of modern Morocco.

== Culture ==
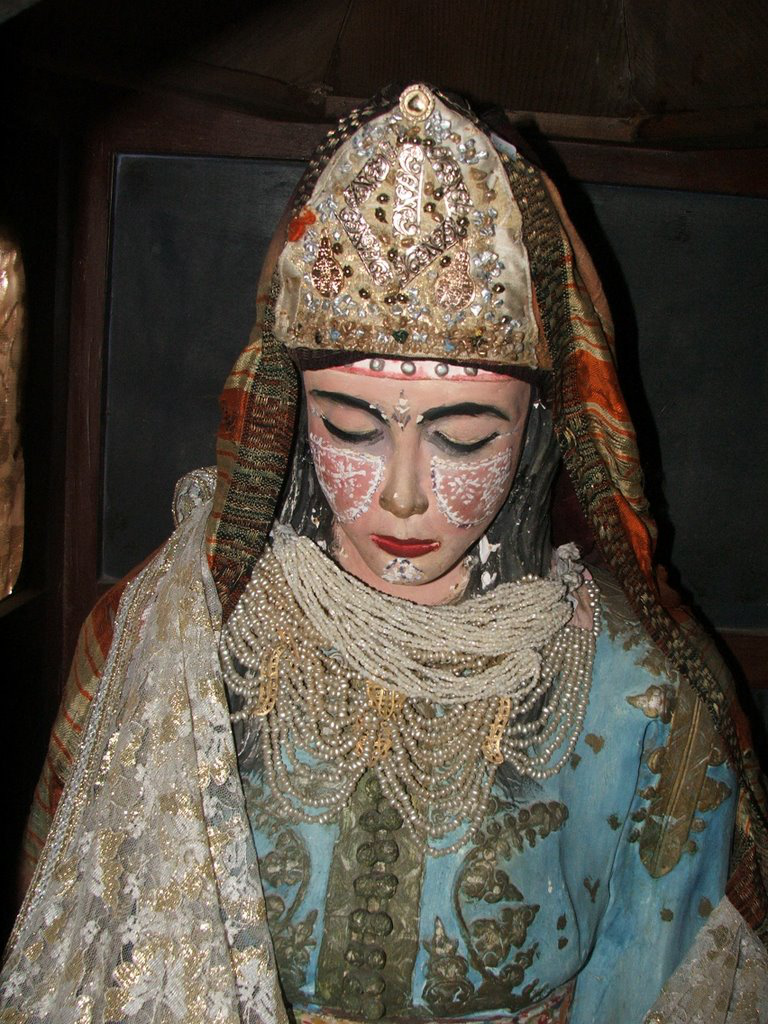
An exhibit at the Tetouan Ethnographic Museum.

=== Culture ===
Tétouan is famed for its fine craftsmanship and musical delicacy and has been part of the UNESCO Creative Cities Network in the area of Crafts and Folk Art since 2017. Its cultural heritage is the product of the interaction between different cultural influences throughout centuries. It is mainly characterized by its Andalusian style and ways of living; Berber, Jewish, and Spanish influences are also present.

=== Literature ===
The city has produced many scholars in different disciplines throughout centuries. One of the first newspapers in Morocco, El Eco de Tetuan, was published in the city in 1860. During the protectorate period, whereas French authorities took measures to censor publications in Arabic in the area under its control, Tétouan, the capital of the northern Spanish area, became a center of publishing and the capital of Moroccan literary life. Many historic newspapers were published in Tétouan, including the first nationalist publication in Morocco, as-Salaam October 1933, followed by al-Hurriya and others. These were published by members of this intellectual circle in Tetuan that included figures like Abdesalam Bennuna, Muhammad Daoud, Abdelkhaleq Torres, and Abdellah Guennoun.

=== Religion ===
The vast majority of Tétouan's population is Muslim. There is a small Christian community. During recent decades, the numbers of Tétouan's Jewish community have declined. By 2014, the Jewish community numbered no more than one dozen people. Notable spiritual leaders include Sufi saint Ahmad ibn Ajiba, as well as Jewish Rabbis Yosef Maimon and Isaac Ben Walid. Tétouan also had a vibrant Sephardic Jewish community with strong ties to Al-Andalus.

=== Architecture ===
The streets are fairly wide and straight, and many of the houses belonging to aristocratic families, descendants of those expelled from Al-Andalus by the Spanish Reconquista, possess marble fountains and have groves planted with orange trees. Within the houses and riads the ceilings are often exquisitely carved and painted in Hispano-Moresque designs, such as are found in the Alhambra of Granada, and the tilework for which Tétouan is known may be seen on floors, pillars, and dados. The city has seven gates which were closed at night up until the early 20th century. Many Sufi Zawiyas are scattered inside the walled old city.

=== Food ===
Tétouan has rich culinary traditions unique in Moroccan cuisine, and the influence of, Arab, Amazigh, Andalusi, Turkish, and Spanish cuisines are noted in the variety of dishes and pastries.

Amazigh and Arab cuisine are present in staples of Moroccan cuisine such as cuscus and rafissa or thrid, respectively.

As in other Moroccan cities (for examples, Rabat, Salé, Fes, and Tangier), Tétouan inherited Andalusi culinary traditions through the waves of migration (terminating with the arrival of the expelled Moriscos 1609–1614). This manifests itself in classic dishes, such as pastilla. However, the pastilla traditionally made in Tétouan is more savory than sweet, with more preserved lemon and no sugar or almonds.

Tétouan has been also influenced by Algerian and Ottoman cuisine, and this is due to the wave of migrants from Algeria following the French conquest of Algeria. This influence manifests itself prominently in the sweets of Tétouan, which include qatayef and baklava.

=== Crafts ===
Traditional craftsmanship is concentrated in the old medina where every industry has its own quarter with the same name where workshops and shops are found. Among them are Zellige (tilework), pottery, plaster engravings, embroidery, inlaying with silver wire, the manufacture of thick-soled yellow slippers, much-esteemed flintlocks, and artistic towels used as capes and skirts by Jebala women in rural areas.

=== Museums and festivals ===
The Lucas Museum of Religious Heritage (متحف لوقش للتراث الديني) is housed in the historic Madrasat Lucas in Tétouan. In addition to archaeological, traditional, and modern art museums, as well as an archival library, Tétouan hosts a school of music and many artisan schools. Different music genres of local or regional origins can be found in Tétouan. Traditional Andalusian classical music is the most popular and folk singers such as Abdessadeq Cheqara are widely known in Morocco. Other popular local genres like Taktoka Jabaliya also exist and are usually played at weddings.

Tétouan hosts many international festivals such as the International Mediterranean Film Festival, and the International Oud and Women's Voice (أصوات نسائية) Festival.

On November 20, 2013, the city's Centro de Arte Moderno (Center of Modern Art) was launched and currently holds between 180 and 200 artworks from both self-trained artists and graduates of the city's National Institute of Fine Arts.

=== Languages and Dialects ===
According to the 2024 Moroccan census, 97.20% of the population of Tétouan spoke Arabic as their native language, while 2.50% spoke Berber languages natively. The Arabic of Tetouan has its own dialect, a particular citadin variant of pre-Hilalian Arabic which is distinct from Jebli Arabic. However, Jeblia, which is a dialect of Darija, is predominant since people from the neighboring rural areas settled in the city during the 20th-century rural flights. The use of Spanish and French is widespread, especially among professionals and intellectual elites, due to past historical ties and coastal Morocco's close geographic proximity to Europe.

== Geography ==
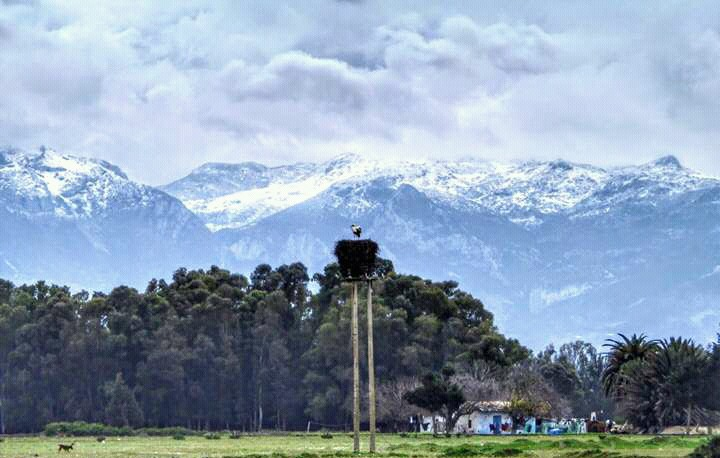
A view of the Rif mountains in Tétouan

The city is situated about 60 km east of the city of Tangier and 40 km south of the Strait of Gibraltar. To the south and west of the city, there are mountains. Tétouan is situated in the middle of a belt of orchards that grow oranges, almonds, pomegranates, and cypress trees. The Rif Mountains are nearby, as the city is located in the Martil Valley. It is picturesquely situated on the northern slope of a fertile valley down which flows the Martil River, with the harbour of Tétouan, Martil, at its mouth. Behind rise rugged masses of rock, the southern wall of the Anjera country, once practically closed to Europeans; across the valley are the hills which form the northern limit of the still more impenetrable Rif.

=== Climate ===
Tétouan features a Mediterranean climate with Köppen climate classification of Csa. Located along the Mediterranean Sea, the weather in Tétouan is mild and rainy during the winter, hot and dry in the summer months.

Climate data for Tétouan 1991–2020 normals, 1961–present extremes
Month	Jan	Feb	Mar	Apr	May	Jun	Jul	Aug	Sep	Oct	Nov	Dec	Year
Record high °C (°F)	25.4 (77.7)	27.5 (81.5)	31.0 (87.8)	30.3 (86.5)	35.1 (95.2)	38.9 (102.0)	42.5 (108.5)	43.1 (109.6)	36.2 (97.2)	34.8 (94.6)	34.0 (93.2)	30.1 (86.2)	43.1 (109.6)
Mean daily maximum °C (°F)	17.4 (63.3)	17.7 (63.9)	19.0 (66.2)	20.7 (69.3)	23.4 (74.1)	27.1 (80.8)	30.0 (86.0)	30.3 (86.5)	27.6 (81.7)	24.2 (75.6)	20.5 (68.9)	18.2 (64.8)	23.0 (73.4)
Daily mean °C (°F)	13.4 (56.1)	13.9 (57.0)	15.3 (59.5)	16.7 (62.1)	19.1 (66.4)	22.5 (72.5)	25.1 (77.2)	25.9 (78.6)	23.6 (74.5)	20.3 (68.5)	16.6 (61.9)	14.4 (57.9)	18.9 (66.0)
Mean daily minimum °C (°F)	9.3 (48.7)	10.0 (50.0)	11.5 (52.7)	12.9 (55.2)	15.2 (59.4)	18.4 (65.1)	20.7 (69.3)	21.4 (70.5)	19.5 (67.1)	16.4 (61.5)	12.7 (54.9)	10.5 (50.9)	14.9 (58.8)
Record low °C (°F)	−2.3 (27.9)	−1.0 (30.2)	−0.5 (31.1)	0.0 (32.0)	4.0 (39.2)	7.0 (44.6)	10.4 (50.7)	5.4 (41.7)	10.9 (51.6)	0.0 (32.0)	0.0 (32.0)	0.0 (32.0)	−2.3 (27.9)
Average precipitation mm (inches)	93.4 (3.68)	86.6 (3.41)	73.1 (2.88)	62.4 (2.46)	30.1 (1.19)	7.6 (0.30)	0.6 (0.02)	4.7 (0.19)	28.8 (1.13)	74.8 (2.94)	92.2 (3.63)	100.4 (3.95)	654.7 (25.78)
Average precipitation days (≥ 1 mm)	7.6	7.4	7.4	6.8	4.4	1.0	0.2	0.6	3.1	6.8	7.7	8.7	61.7
Average relative humidity (%) (at 7:00)	83	83	86	85	79	78	75	77	84	85	86	82	82
Mean monthly sunshine hours	186.0	170.8	226.3	246.0	294.5	318.0	344.1	325.5	258.0	226.3	183.0	182.9	2,961.4
Percentage possible sunshine	58.8	55.5	60.8	63.1	67.9	72.6	77.6	77.8	69.4	64.6	59.2	59.0	65.6
Source 1: NOAA
Source 2: Deutscher Wetterdienst (humidity, 1961–1990), Weather-2-Visit (sunshine duration and percentage), Météo climat (extremes)

== Education ==
=== Education and the national movement ===
During the 1920s, activists belonging to the national movement in northern Morocco, especially in Tétouan under Spanish protectorate, made science and education a supreme goal of their struggle to combat colonialism. In 1924, and after considerable effort and determination, they established a primary school and named it the "Al Madrasa al-Ahliyah" (Arabic: المدرسة الأهلية meaning National School). Among them were historian Mohammed Daoud, Abdel Salam Bennouna, and Mustafa Afilal. To this end, members of the National Movement carried out a popular campaign under the leadership of the Special Education Committee established in 1934. In the summer of 1935, a group of activists met at the house of Mustafa Afilal, and after a long debate about educational dimensions, material resources, and other things, the group concluded by approving the establishment of a special secondary educational institution. The name of the institution remained suspended until the end of the year. After additional meetings, nationalist leader and Professor Abdelkhalek Torres, being impressed with the role played by the "free men" in the era of the Second Spanish Republic, said to his colleagues: most of the men of science, thought and liberation in Spain, graduated from Madrid's Instituto Libre. Therefore, I hope and suggest that you call our institute the Free Institute (Arabic: المعهد الحر). After this was approved, the Free Institute was established on November 5, 1935.

The students of the Institute were among the first to demonstrate and protest against the Spanish administration. The year 1948, in which bloody events took place between the citizens demanding independence and the Spanish colonialism, in which a student of the institute was killed by colonial agents, was a milestone in its history. The Spanish administration began to take over the institute. All the staff were arrested and imprisoned in Ceuta. However, weeks later, historian Tuhami al-Wazzani, who was then the director of the elementary school, joined the institute and asked the college students to help teach the younger ones so that the institute would not stop teaching altogether. Since then, secondary education has ceased and has been limited to primary education up to this day. Many graduates continued their higher education in Spain, Cairo, and Baghdad.

=== Other schools and institutions of higher education ===
Tétouan is home to l'Institut National des Beaux-Arts (National Institute of Fine Arts), the only national arts institution of higher education in Morocco. It was founded in 1945. Its promoter and first director was the Spanish Orientalist painter Mariano Bertuchi. The city also hosts the Ecole Nationale d'Architecture, a public architecture school.

Tétouan's public Abdelmalek Essaâdi University was founded in 1993. The 16th-century Moroccan sultan Abu Marwan Abd al-Malik I Saadi is the university's namesake. The university has a student body of 86,000, one of the largest in Morocco. The Faculty of Theology (Arabic : كلية أصول الدين) was established in 1963 and was an affiliate of the prestigious Al Quaraouiyine University in Fez until 2015, when it was annexed to Abdelmalek Essaâdi University.

- Artisan School
- Puerto School
- California School
- Aya Al Madina
- ITSN-Institut Technique des Sciences
- School Hala Andalucia
- Al-Qadi Ibn Al-Arabi

There are also some Spanish international schools operated by that country's Ministry of Education:

- Colegio Español Jacinto Benavente
- Instituto Español Juan de la Cierva
- Instituto Español Nuestra Señora del Pilar
- Instituto Cervantes

=== Foreign cultural centers ===
Several foreign cultural centers are located in Tétouan :

- Spanish Instituto Cervantes
- French Institut Français
- American Language Center

== Economy and infrastructure ==
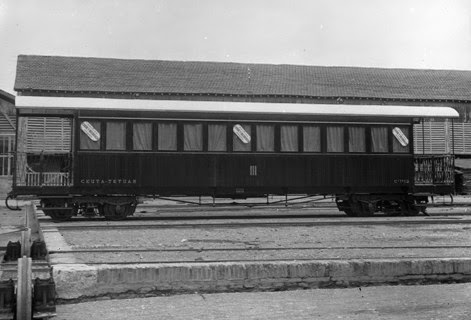
3rd-class carriage of the Ceuta-Tetuán Railway, circa 1930

The economy of the city is based mainly on tourism and commerce. Other sectors of income include fishing and agriculture. Tétouan's civil airport Sania Ramel Airport, which became an international airport that operates flights to western Europe, is operated by the Moroccan Airports Authority and is located 6 km (4 mi) to the east.

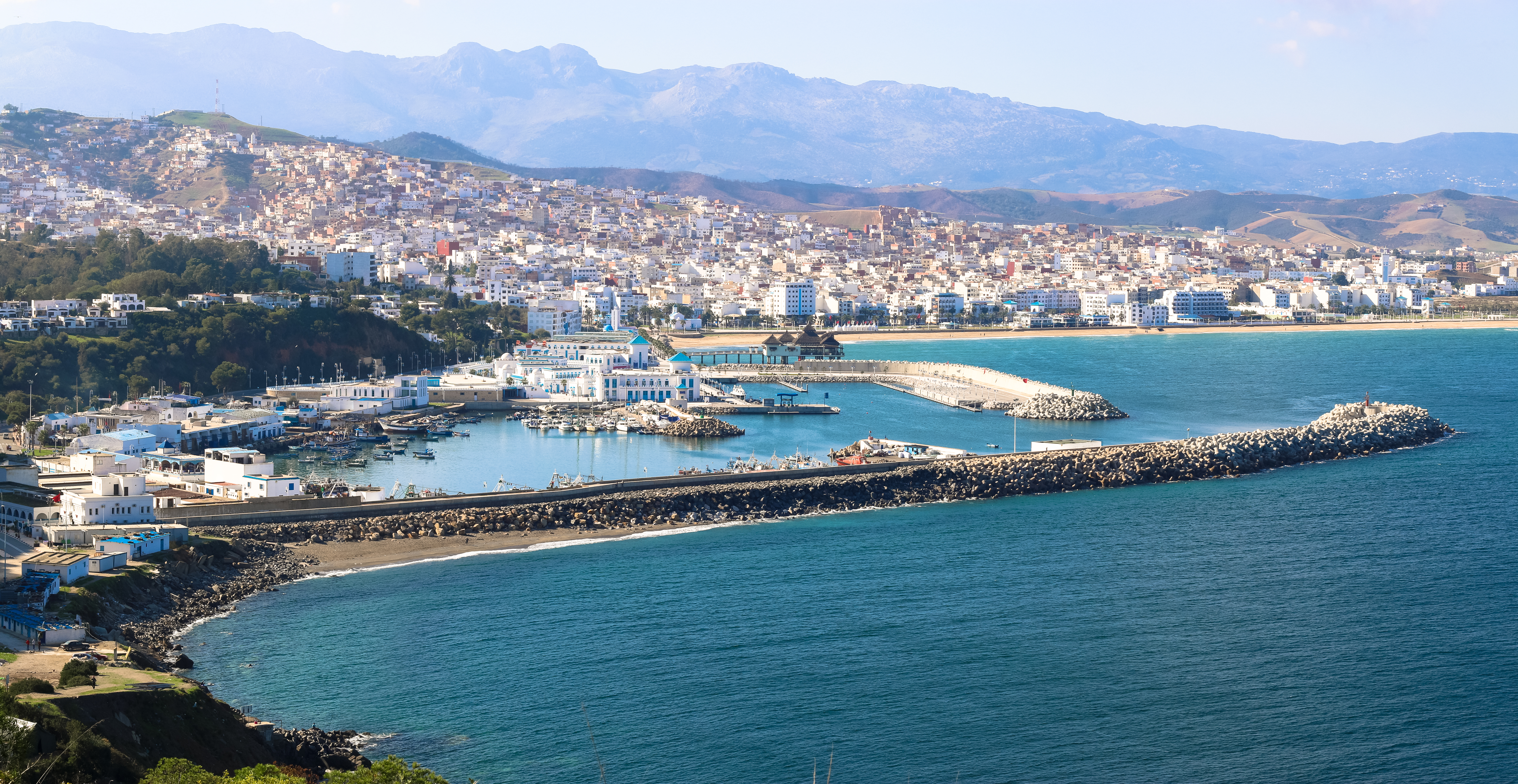
M'diq harbour - Fishing and leisure port at Tamuda Bay

The Ceuta-Tetuán railway line (es) was the first Spanish international railway line that would unite the cities of Ceuta and Tétouan. It was inaugurated on March 17, 1918, by Carlos de Borbón and Khalifa Mohammed Mehedi Uld Ben Ismael. The line is no longer in use. Tétouan is linked to Tangier, Ksar el Kebir, Larache, Chefchaouen, Bab Sebta (border with Ceuta), and Oued Laou via modern national motorways. The 28 km Tetouan–Fnideq expressway was completed in 2005.

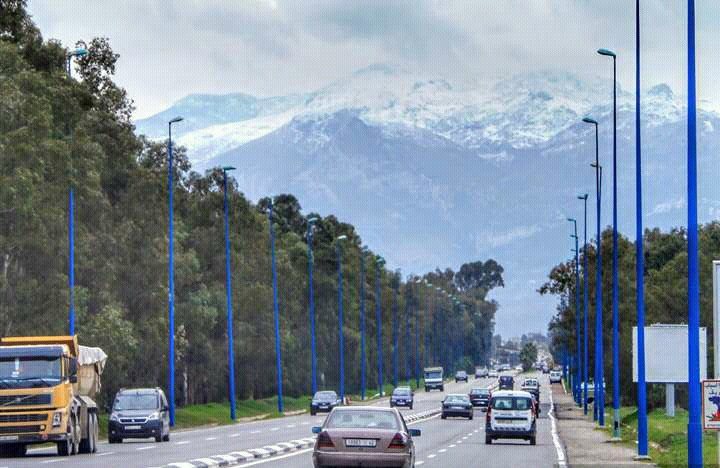
Road linking Tetouan to M'diq

The coastal area is a major tourist destination during the summer period. It stretches from Fnideq, a small city near Ceuta, to the beaches of the small village of El Jebha on the route to Al Hoceima. Several marinas and beach resorts are spread between different villages along the coast. The M'diq port is the main fishing port serving the city. M'diq has another port dedicated to leisure. Both have been expanded recently in order to improve tourist offerings and to increase the harbour's capacity. Boats up to 50 metres long with a depth of nearly five metres can be moored.

Cultural tourism has also been developed during recent years. Many historical sites and monuments are found within and outside the old city (medina).

During the 20th century, Tétouan had a few flourishing industries such as paper manufacturing, which was led by the Papelera de Tetuán company. The company was later merged with its competitor Cellulose du Maroc, having its operations stopped in Tétouan and its headquarters transferred to Casablanca.

=== Skoundo water distribution system ===
The historic center is equipped with a subterranean piping system for water distribution through its streets. In fact, until the early 1970s, drinking water supply in the old medina was mainly provided through this traditional network called "Skoundo" (El Abdellaoui, 1986). It was developed around the 16th century in parallel with the construction of the first houses during its renewal by Andalusian refugees. It penetrates the ancient city from the far north to the far south. It starts at the top of Mount Dersa and extends underground under channels and pipes made of clay. Although it is not the only ancient water system in Morocco, others having been located in Fez and Chefchaouen, it remains the only one still operating. However, the bad state of the clay pipes combined with neglect and other technical issues make the water undrinkable, although some restorations are underway. Skoundo had a clear impact on various socioeconomic aspects of the city. The system did not serve only houses but also mosques, public toilets, hammams, tanneries, and public mural fountains found in each neighborhood in the old medina.

=== Contraband controversies ===
Since a few decades, and because of the proximity of the city to the Spanish enclave of Ceuta, many people have been relying on contraband activities. Residents of Tétouan do not need a visa to enter Ceuta. Before the 1990s, no passport was needed and a Moroccan ID card was sufficient. In recent years, the border has known many incidents such as stampedes. Human rights groups have often criticized the situation in which women carry heavy loads of goods - giving rise to the epithet "Mule women"- before cases of investigation were opened. In 2018, Morocco suspended commercial customs with the Spanish enclaves of Ceuta and Melilla in order to crack down on the smuggling of illegal products into Morocco from the two cities affecting the country's economic growth. Moroccan customs officials previously estimated the value of the products entering Morocco through the Ceuta border between MAD 6 billion and MAD 8 billion (between €550 million and €730 million) per year. Morocco's government has long maintained that the situation needs a "radical" solution to permanently put an end to contraband border crossings with Melilla and Ceuta."

In 1917, Tetouan saw the appearance of its first football clubs, "Sporting of Tetuán" and "el Hispano-Marroquí" ("The Spanish-Moroccan"). One year later, these two clubs, and a third one called "el Radio", merged and that gave the birth to the "Athletic Club Tetuán". The new club was established in 1922 by Basque Atlético Madrid fans who lived in Tétouan. In the early days, it was known as Athletic Club Tetuan—based on the Spanish spelling of the city. After the Spanish Civil War and according to General Franco's demands (banning non-Spanish names), it became known as Club Atlético Tetuan. This is why the team has always played in red and white stripes and blue shorts, just like their counterparts from Madrid they were supposed to emulate. Under the Spanish protectorate of Northern Morocco, Tétouan was a part of the Spanish Liga for 33 years until Morocco regained its independence in 1956. The highlights of that era were their surprising win of the Spanish Segunda División (the southern group) in the 1950–51 season and their promotion to the Primera Division of 1951–52. The club remains, to this day, the only team from the African mainland ever to play in a top division in Europe.

Today, the city has one professional football club, Moghreb Athletic Tétouan, which competes in the Botola, the top-tier of Moroccan football. The team plays their home games at the Saniat Rmel stadium, the oldest football stadium in Africa. As of the 2018–19 season, the team will play at the new Tétouan Stadium, which will have a seating capacity of more than 41,000. Moghreb Athletic Tétouan won its first league title in the 2011–12 Botola League season, becoming the first Chamali club to ever win the league title. Today, MAT is considered one of the five biggest football clubs in Morocco along with Raja Casablanca, Wydad Casablanca, FAR Rabat, and Maghreb Fès. A new football stadium in the Mediterranean city of Tétouan is currently being built across 36 hectares north of the residential areas, along the new A6 highway. It will occupy former farmlands and become the central sports arena of the agglomeration, replacing the severely dated Stade Saniat Rmel. The stadium is meant to seat 60,000 spectators; original plans called for a capacity of 40,000 but this was increased to 60,000 in order to meet latest FIFA regulations. Construction on the Grand Stade De Tétouan, which was designed by Moroccan architect Nawfal Bakhat, began in 2015 and was initially scheduled for completion in 2018. The project has stalled a number of times, been mired in controversy regarding the authorship of its design plans, and the completion date has been postponed as well. As of January 2020, it is still not finished. The Kingdom of Morocco has submitted a bid to FIFA to host the 2030 World Cup, which will be held in three different countries.

== Sights in and around Tétouan ==
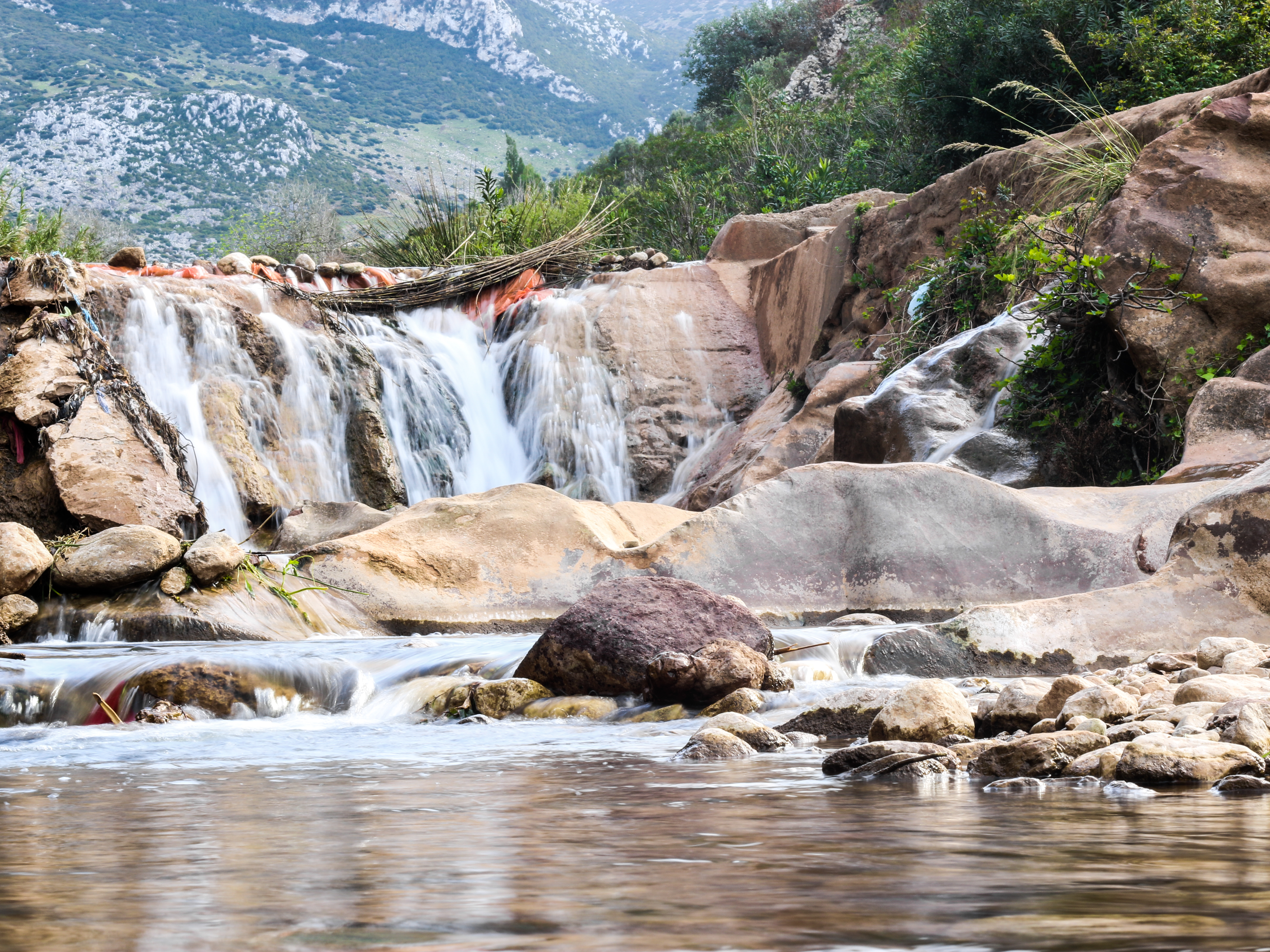
Zerka natural spot in Mount Ghorghiz - Rif Mountains.

- The medina (old town) of Tétouan is on UNESCO's World Heritage List. The inner city is very characteristic and traditional. One can find many white houses there, especially low houses. Everywhere in the city there are people performing their craftsmanship, like weavers, jewellers, leather workers. Street sellers often try to sell carpets to tourists as well. Tétouan is part of the UNESCO Creative Cities Network and was named "City of Crafts and Folk Art" in 2017.
- The Tetouan Archaeological Museum is located in the city center a hundred meters away from the Royal Palace. The museum exhibits artifacts from different periods belonging to indigenous, Phoenician, Roman, Jewish, and Arab cultures. The museum was constructed in 1943.
- The Museum of Modern Art is located in front of Riad Al Ochak garden.
- The Mechouar of the Royal Palace is situated just outside and by one of the entrances to the old medina. There is a public square in front of it.
- Riad Al Ochak (literally meaning "Lovers' Garden"), officially known as Moulay Rachid Garden, is a public garden designed in the moorish style. It is located at the bottom of the hills on the road down to the Martil Valley.
- The kasbah at the top of Mount Dersa, with the ruins of the former barracks of the Regulares, is located alongside a cemetery of indigenous martyrs.
- Tétouan enjoys a large coastline that spans from the border with Ceuta to the road to Al Hoceima. It is usually very busy in the summer time and hosts many international clubs, hotels, golf resorts, and marinas such as Club Med, Sofitel, and the Ritz-Carlton located in the Tamuda Bay area between M'diq and Fnideq. The nearest beach is the popular city of Martil. Other villages include Cabo Negro, Oued Lao, El Jebha.
- Tétouan is surrounded by two mounts: Dersa and Ghorghiz. Several natural spots are available and hiking activities are popular.
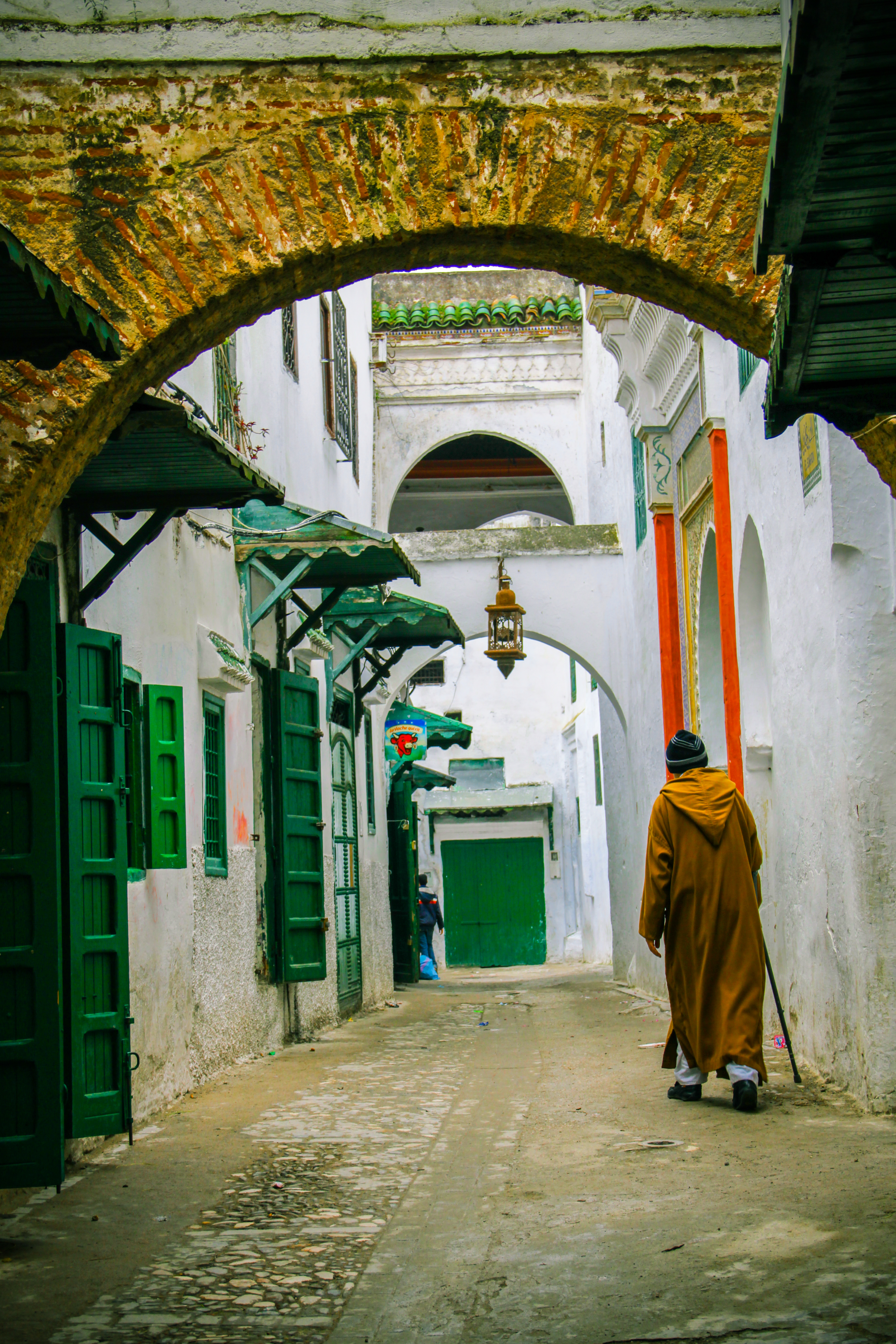
A scene from the narrow streets of the old medina

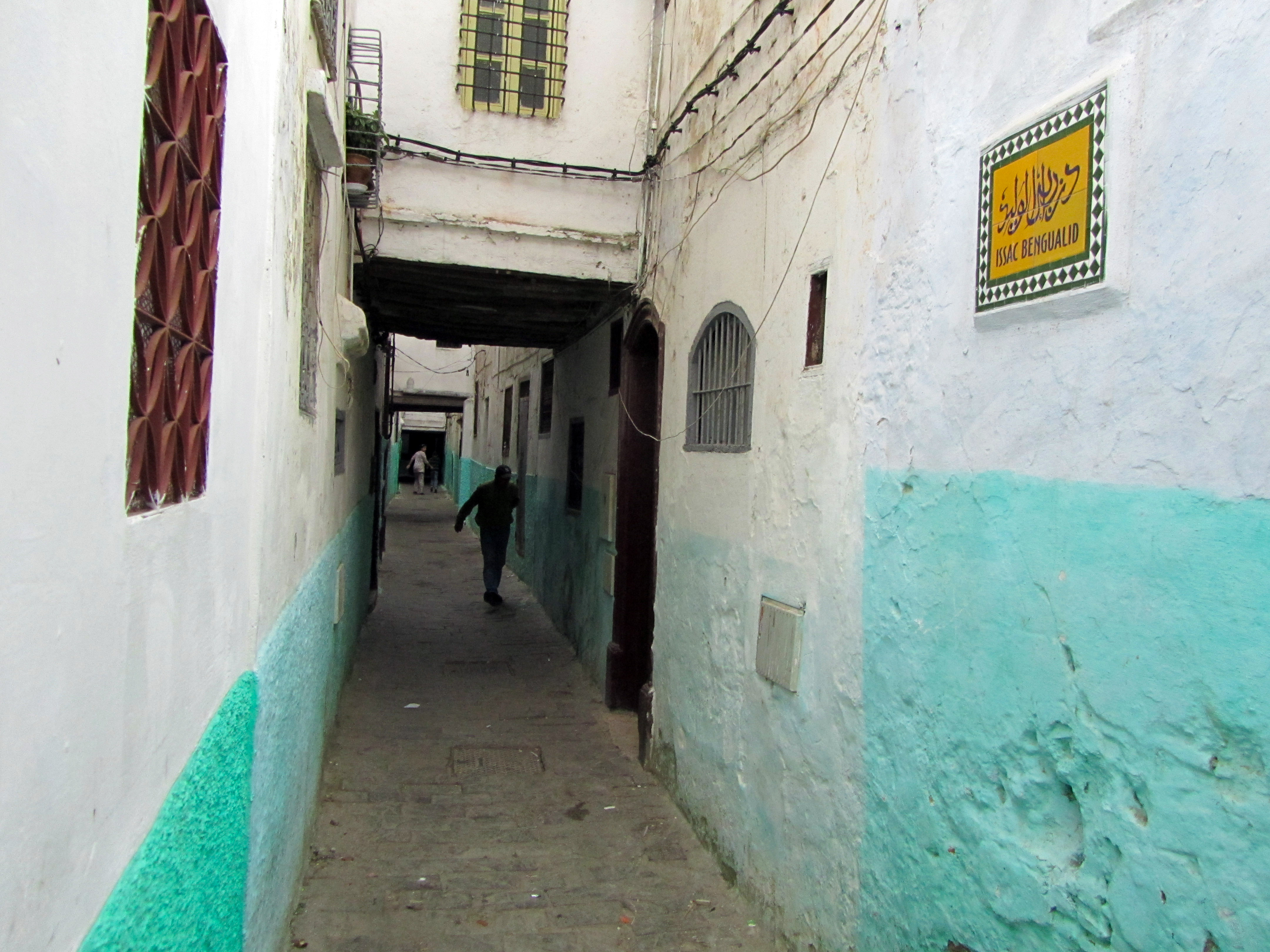
A street in the mellah, the former Jewish quarter

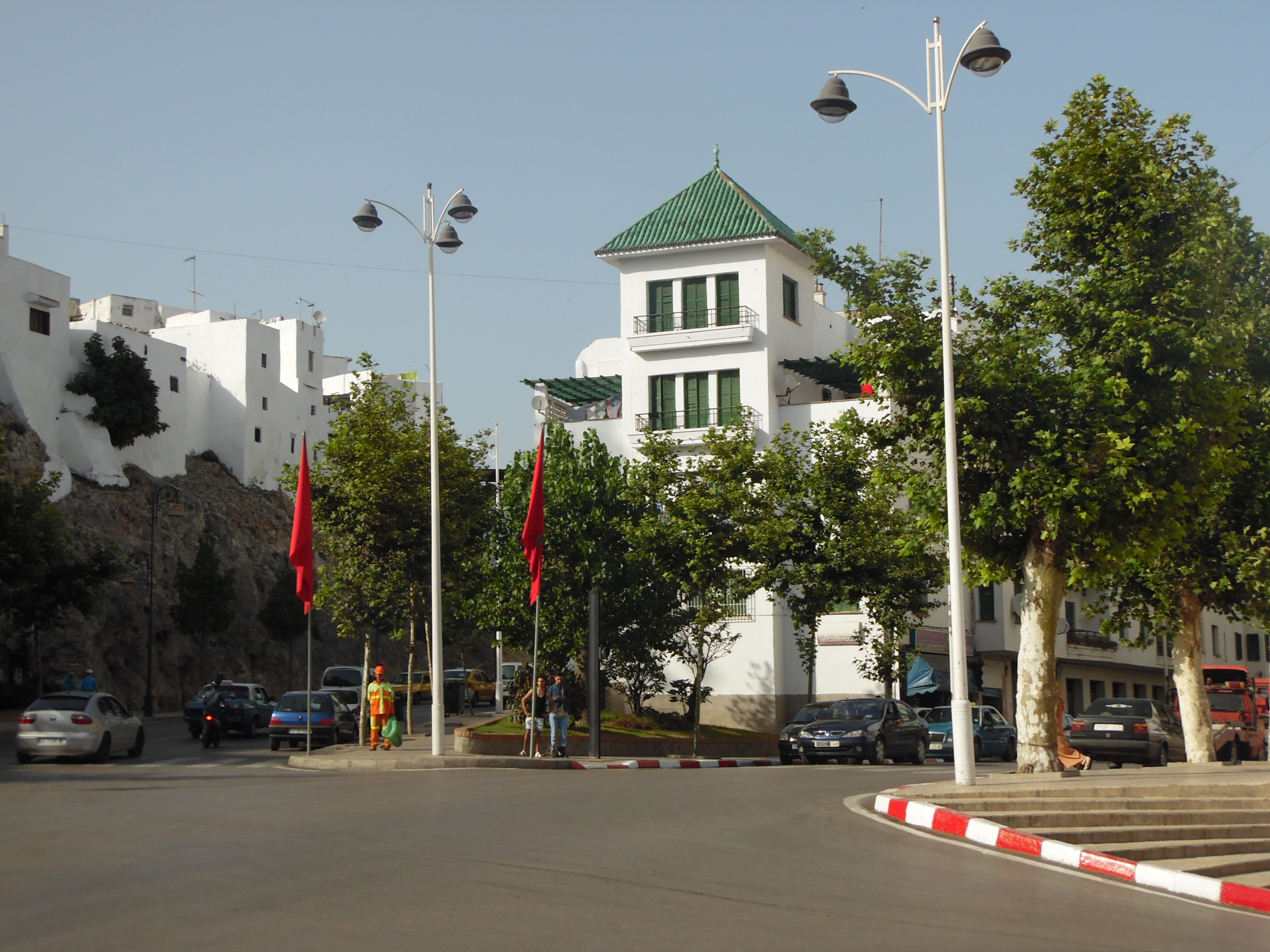
An edifice near Bab Okla, one of the 7 main gates of the city

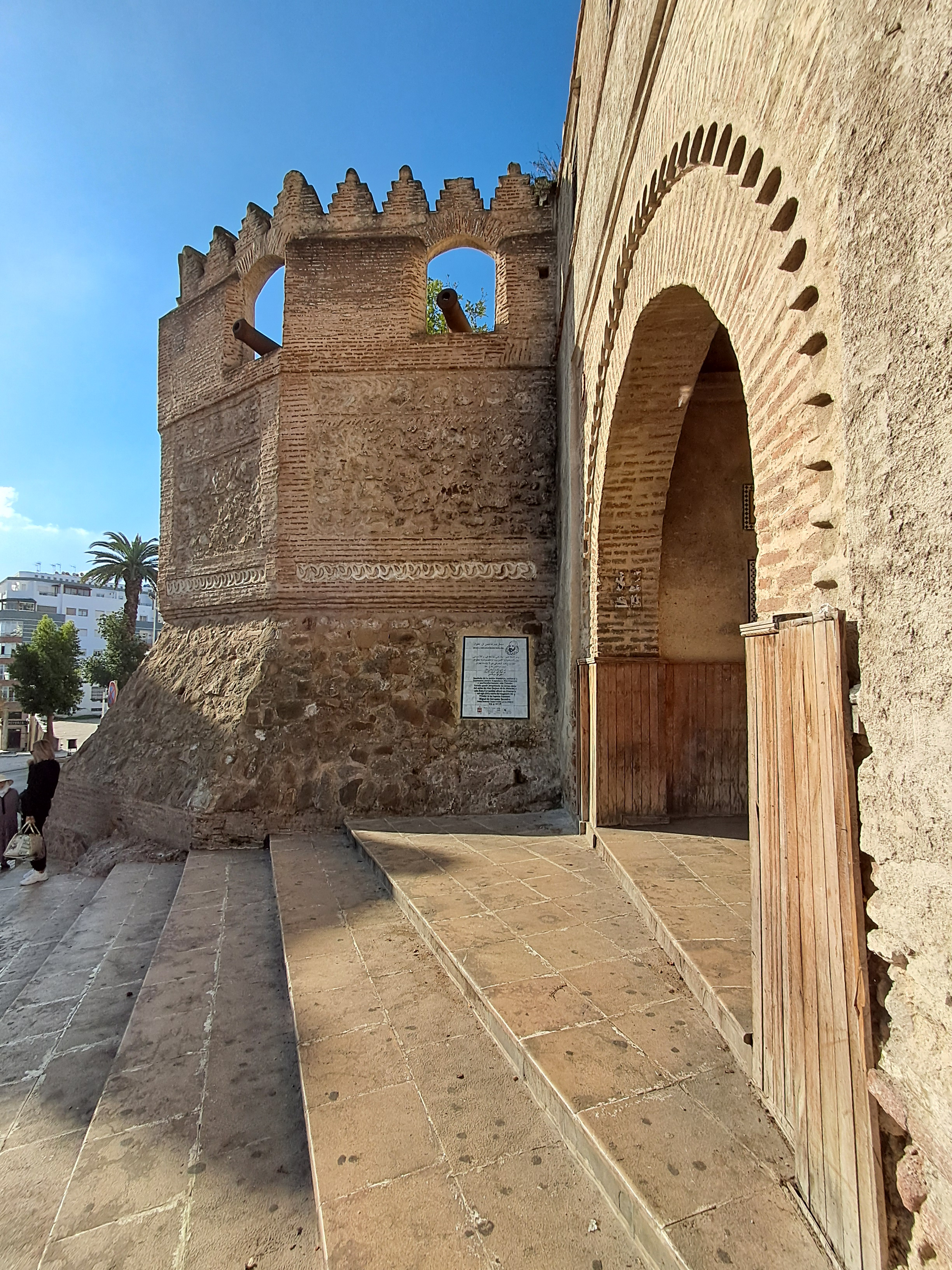
Bab Okla

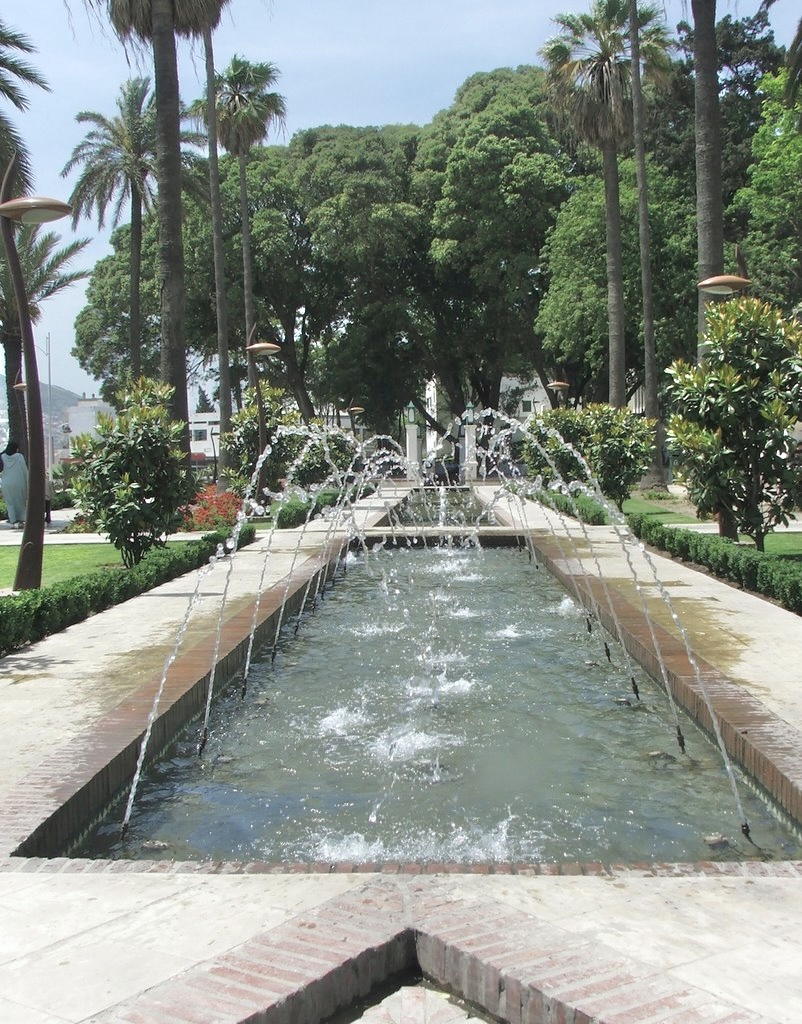
Riad Al Ochak public garden

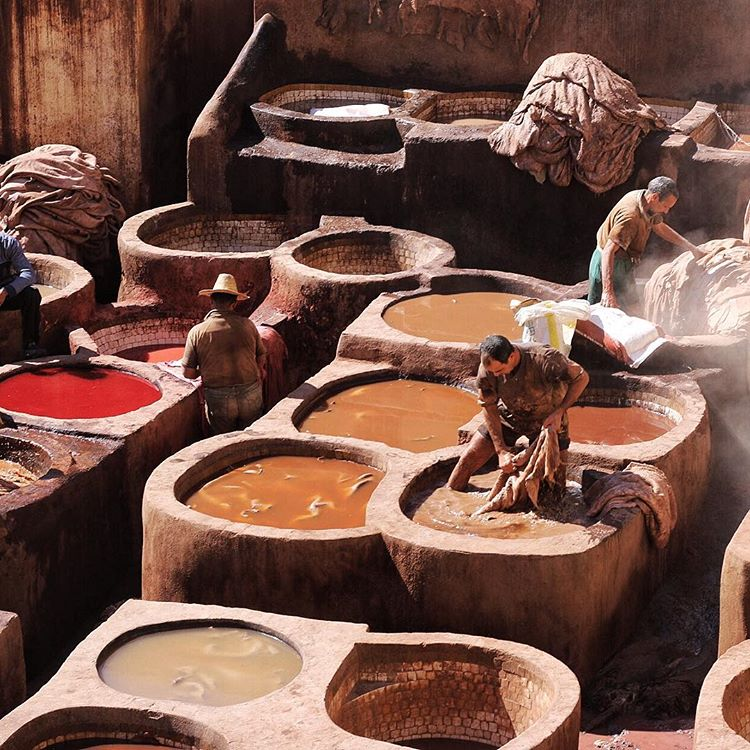
Tanneries of Dar Dbagh

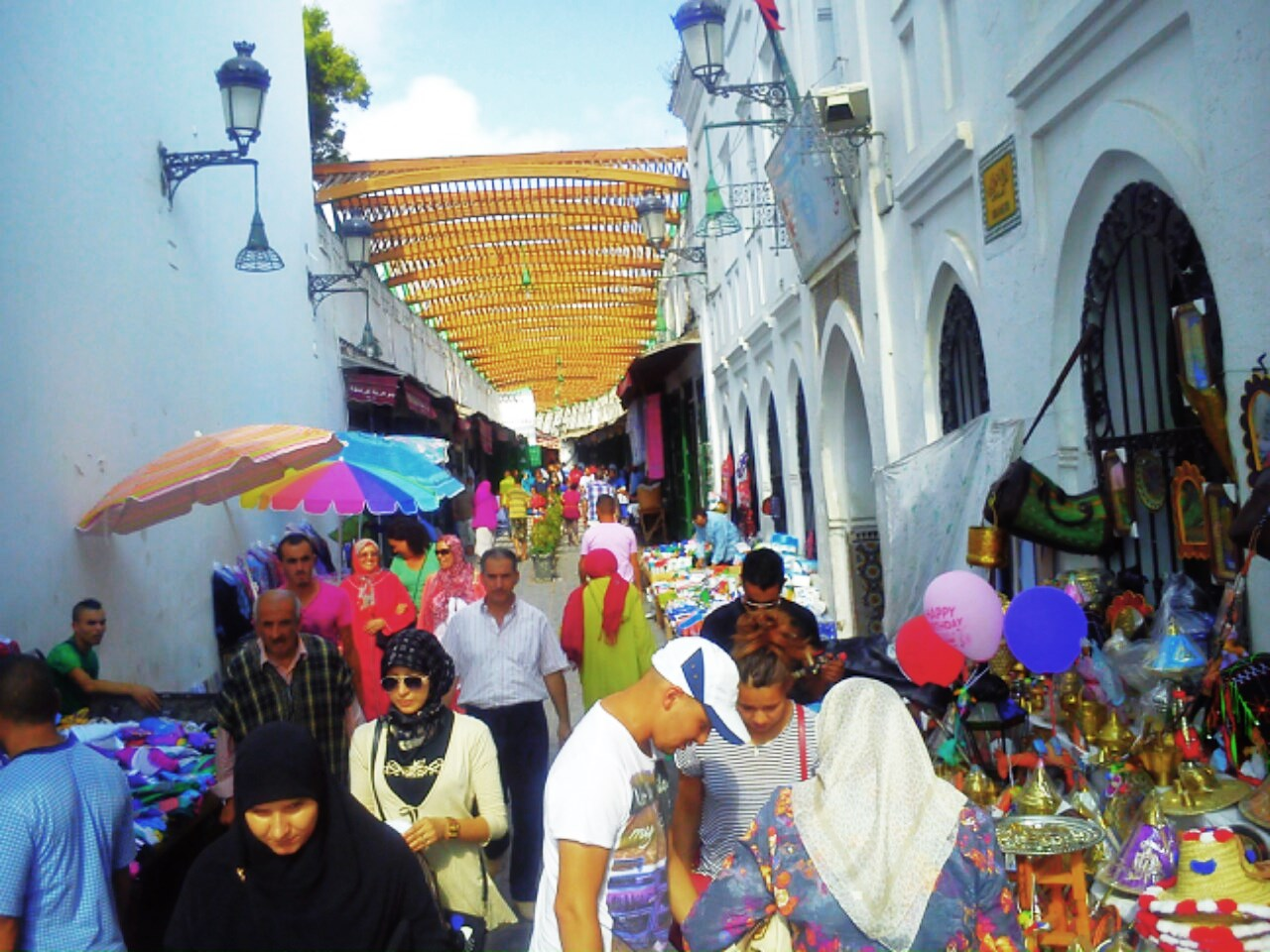
Souk in Tétouan (popular market)

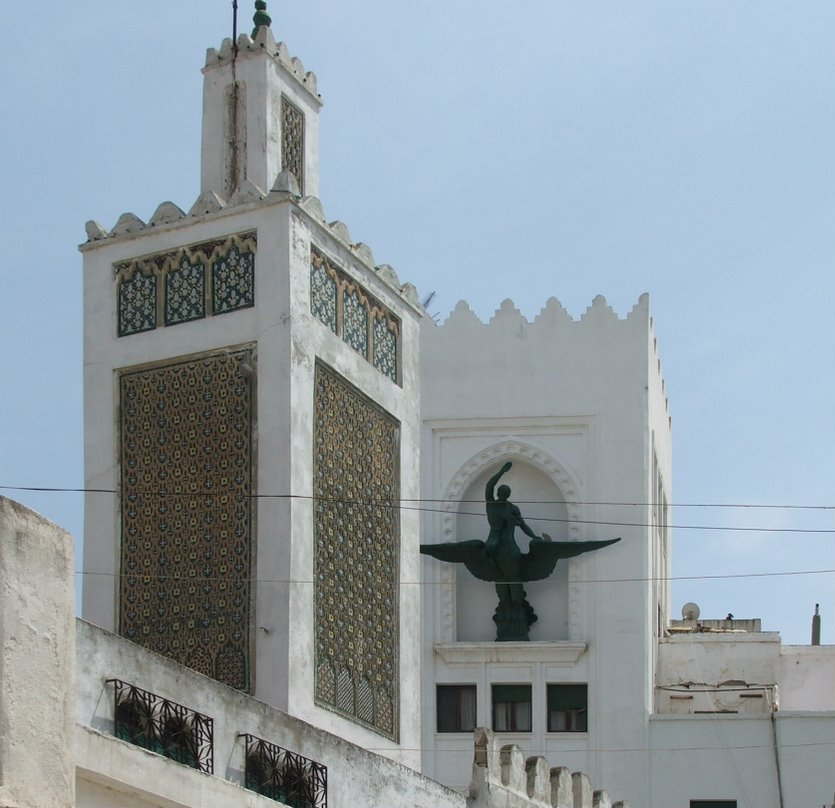
Minaret of Zawya Moulay Abdelkader adjacent to the Phoenix building near the Royal Palace

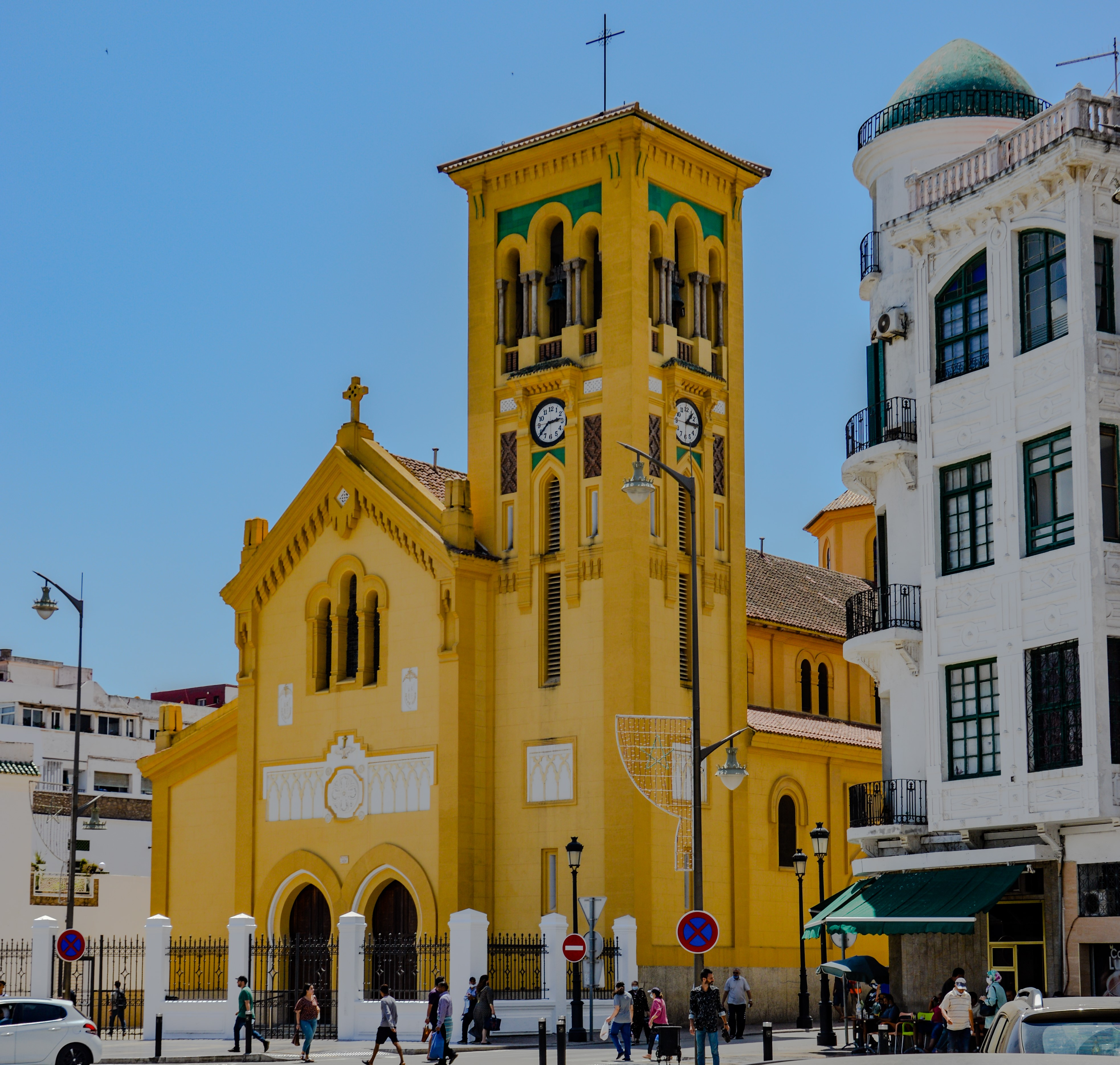
Tétouan Catholic Church, built during the Spanish protectorate in Morocco, and still active today, it is considered one of the best examples of the Spanish influence and heritage on Tétouan

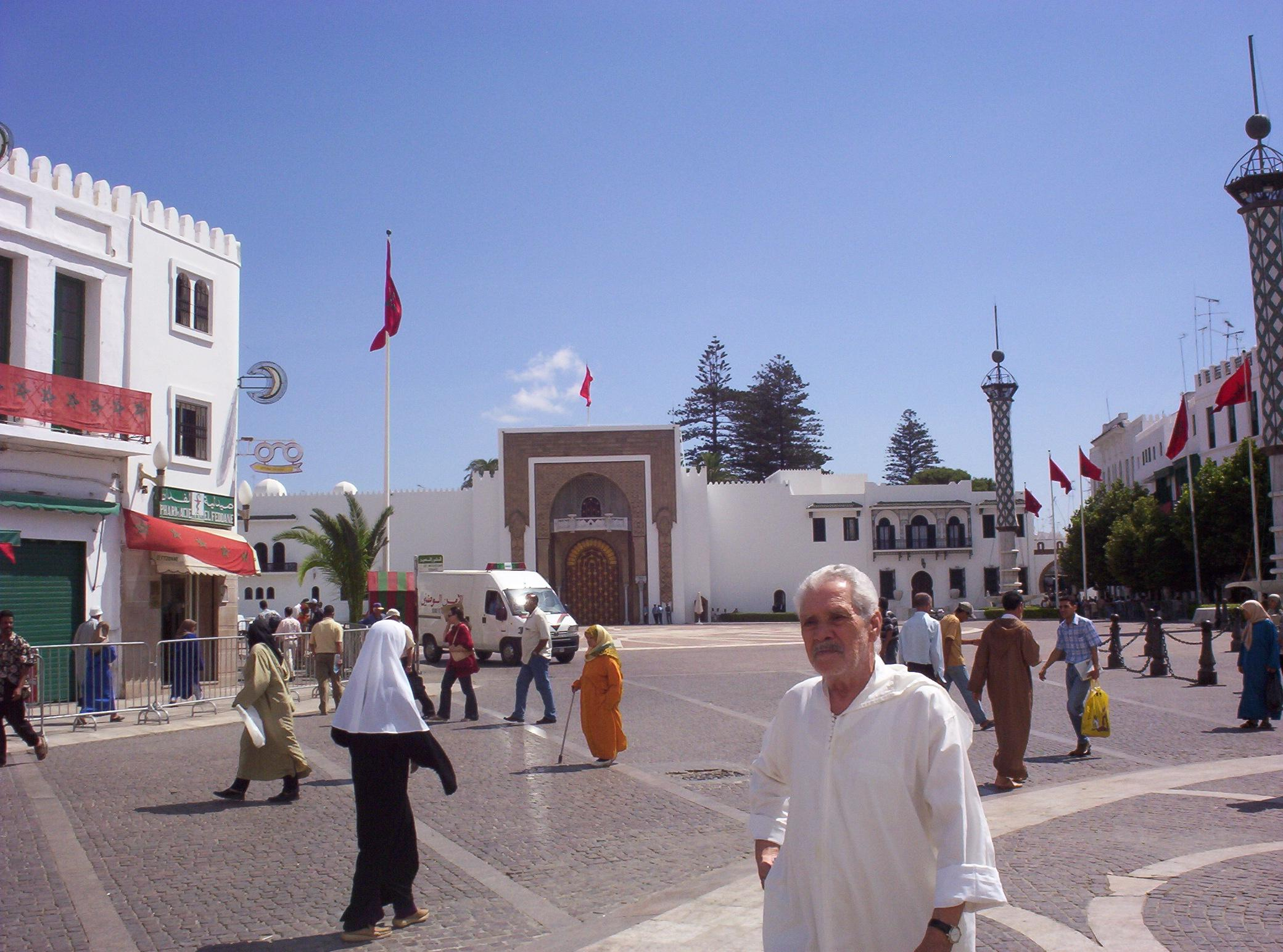
Mechouar of the Royal Palace (Formerly al-Feddan)

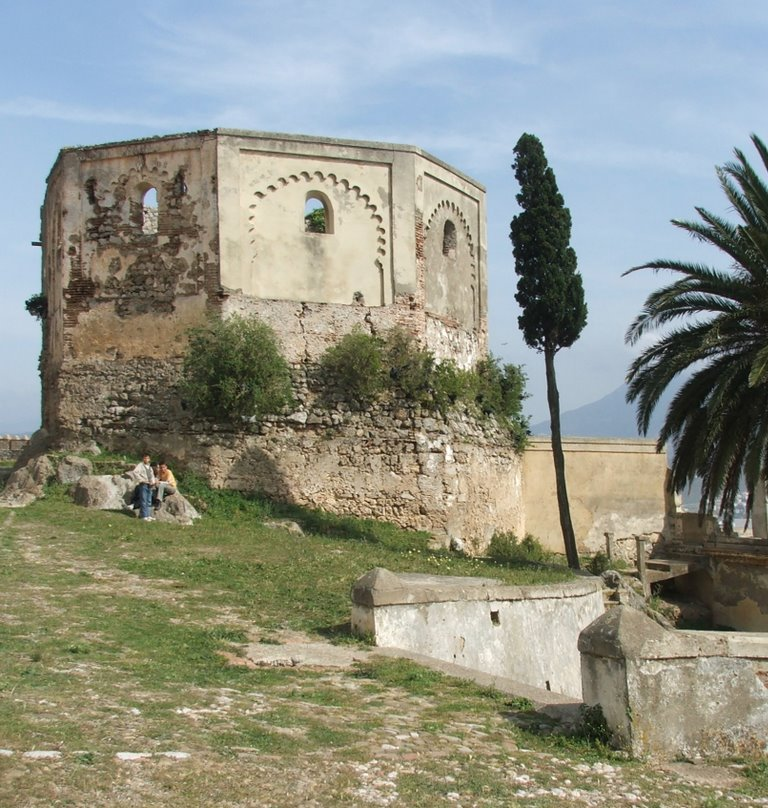
Ruins of Alcazaba de los Adives near the former barracks of the Regulares

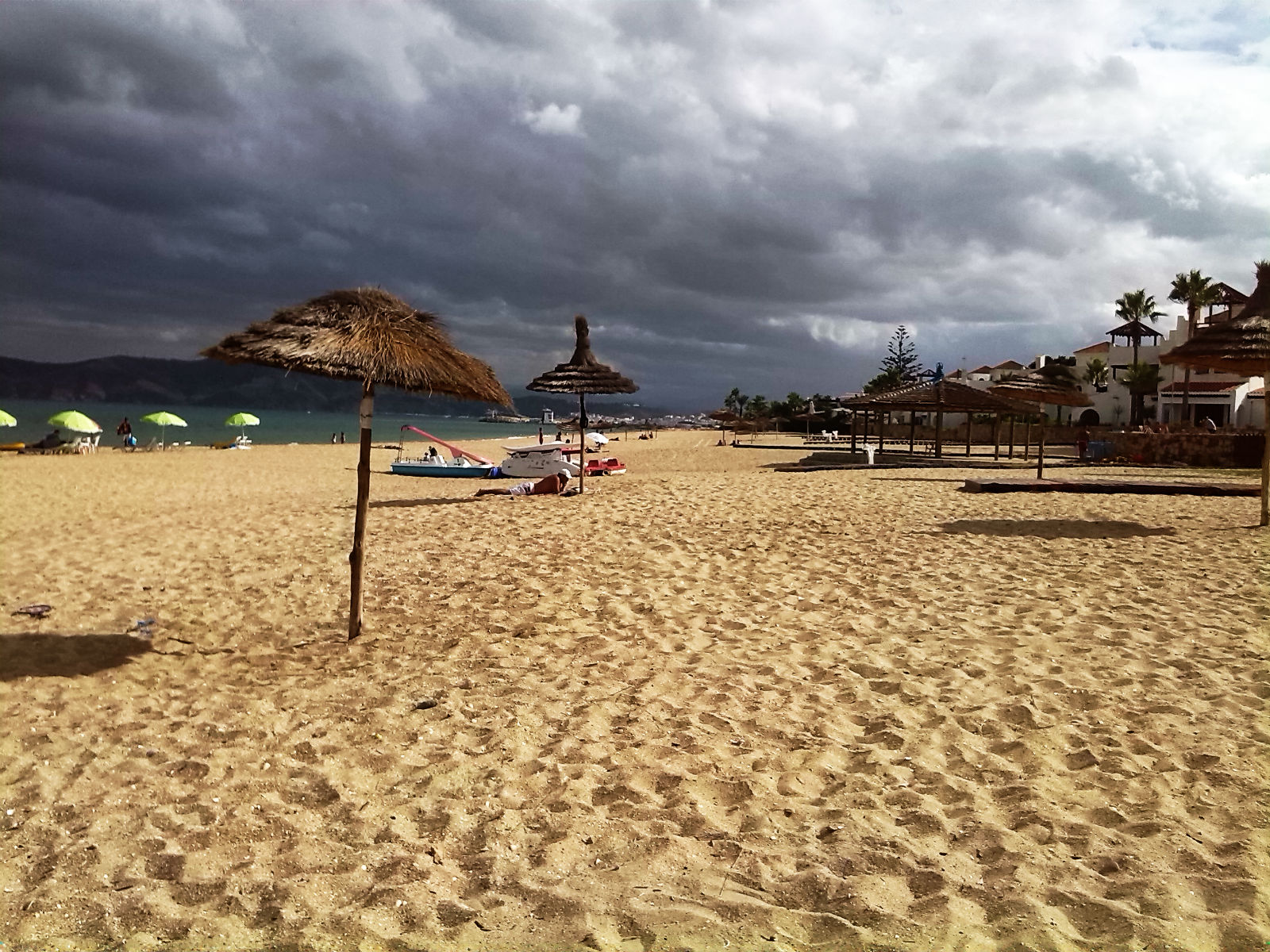
Kasr Rimal beach in Tamuda Bay between Fnideq and M'diq

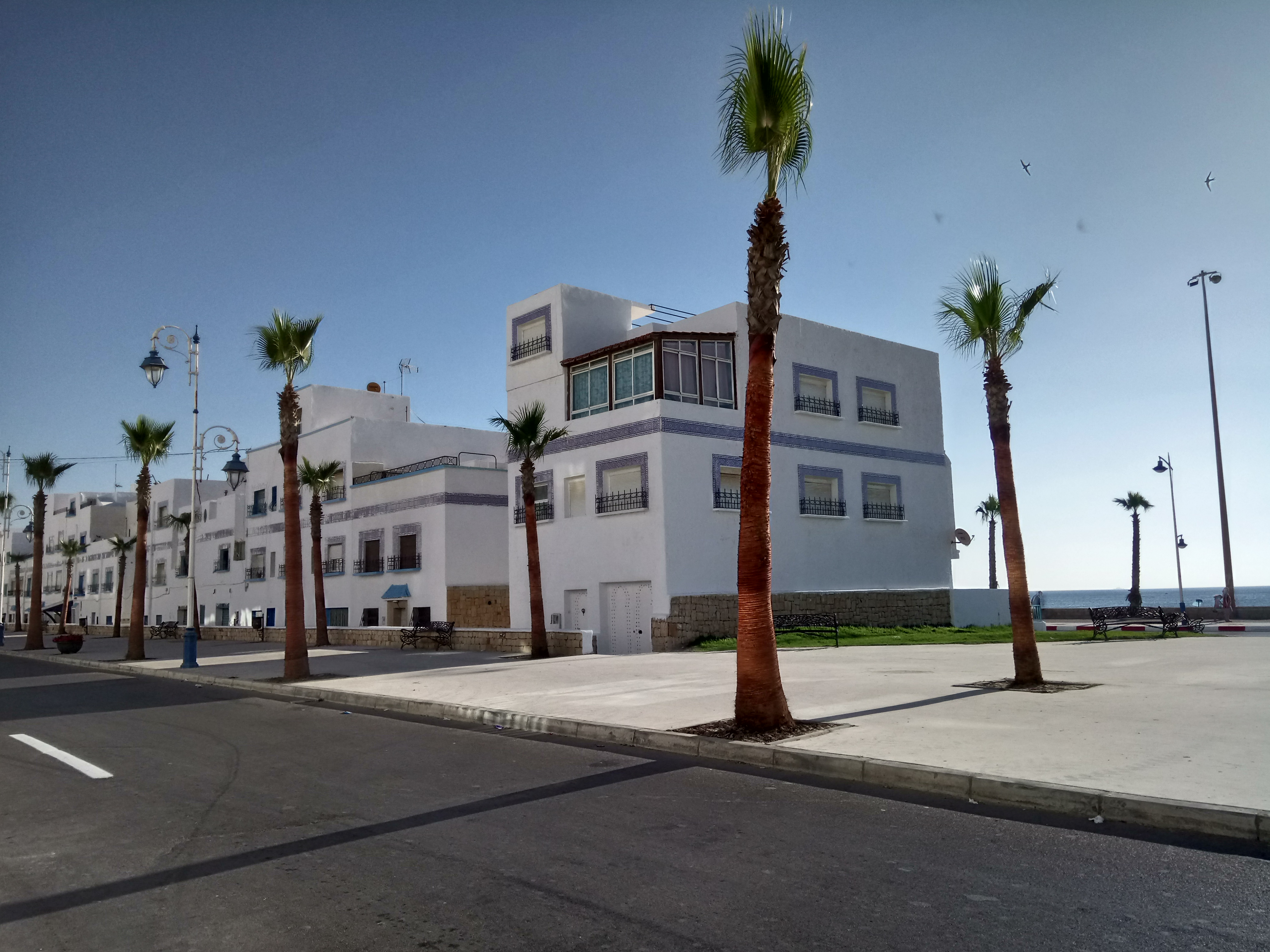
Corniche of Martil

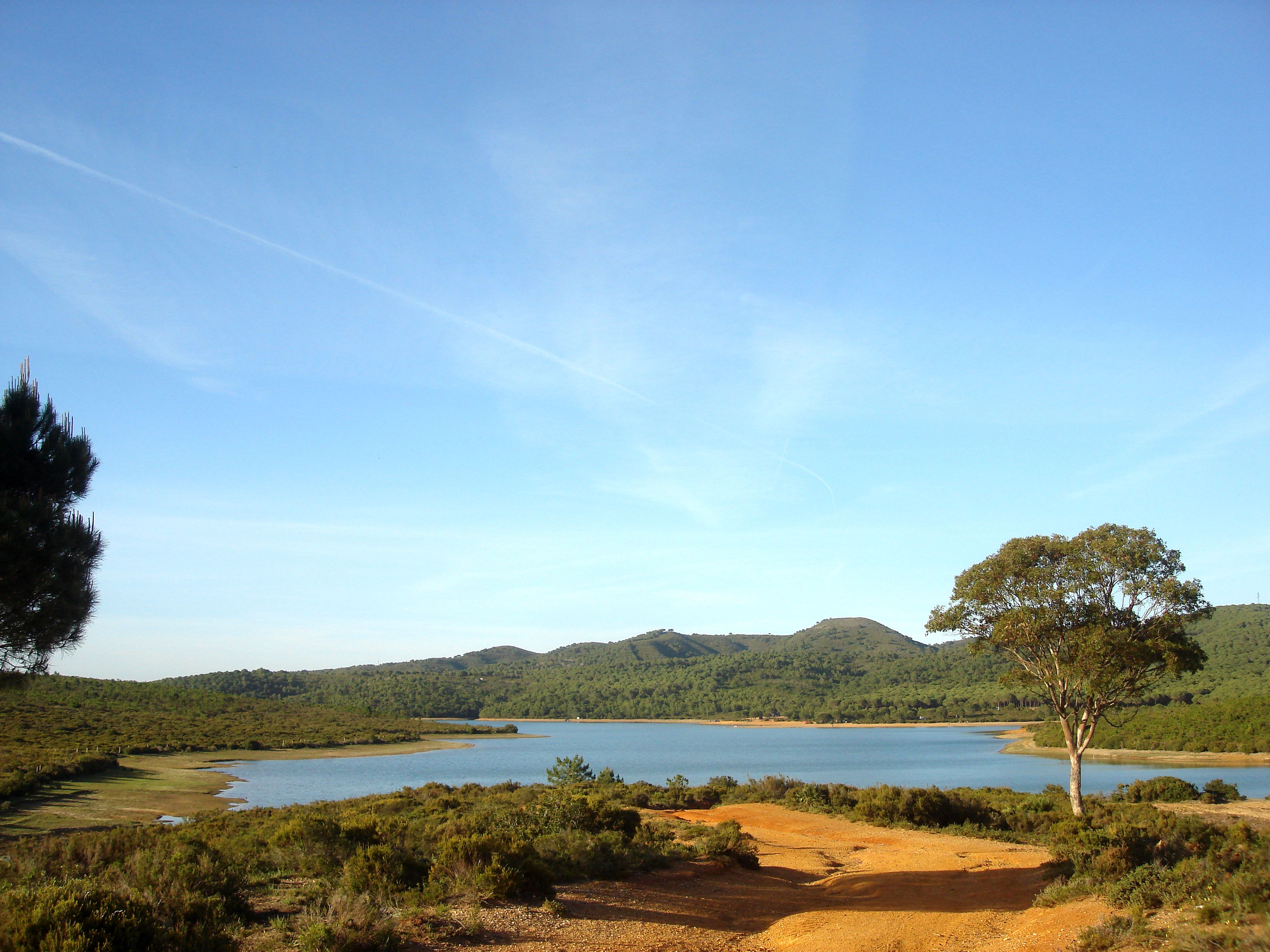
Smir Dam near M'diq

== Notable people ==
- Amina, bint al-Hajj ʿAbd al-Latif (fl.1802-12), Moroccan jurist and scribe
- Abdelkhalek Torres (1910–1970), Moroccan nationalist leader
- Abdessadeq Cheqara (1931–1998), Moroccan musician
- Ahmad ibn Ajiba (1747–1809), Sufi saint.
- Ahmed Chawki (born 1982), Moroccan singer and songwriter.
- Ali al-Mandri (15th century), the city refounder
- Btissam Sadini (born 1998), Moroccan karateka
- Fayçal Azizi (born 1986), Moroccan singer and songwriter
- Isaac Ben Walid (1777–1870), prominent Moroccan rabbi and chief rabbi of Tétouan for four decades
- Leopoldo O'Donnell, 1st Duke of Tetuan (1809–1867), Spanish statesman and descendant of the old Irish royal family, the O'Donnells of Tyrconnell.
- Lolo Sainz (born 1940), Spanish basketball player and coach
- Mohamed Abarhoun (1989-2020), Former international footballer
- Mohammed al-Haik, 18th-century poet and musician
- Mohammed Daoud (1901–1984), Moroccan historian
- Mohamed Yalouh (born 2005), Moroccan inventor
- Mois Benarroch (born 1959), poet
- Omar Azziman (born 1947), royal advisor
- RedOne (born 1972), music producer
- Sayyida al Hurra (1485–1561), Pirate Queen of Tétouan and Queen of Morocco
- Tuhami al-Wazzani (1903–1972), Moroccan historian
- Yosef Maimon (1741–1822), Jewish spiritual leader.
- Zakaria El Wardi, Moroccan footballer
- Zouhair Feddal (born 1989), Moroccan footballer

== Twin towns ==
- Monastir, Tunisia
- Granada, Spain
- Santa Fe, Argentina
- Terrassa, Spain

== See also ==
- Titouan
- Atlético Tetuán team
- Spanish Morocco

== Notes and references ==
- www.tetouanet.com Tetouanet - Tétouan City Guide
