= Oued Laou =

Oued Laou واد لاو
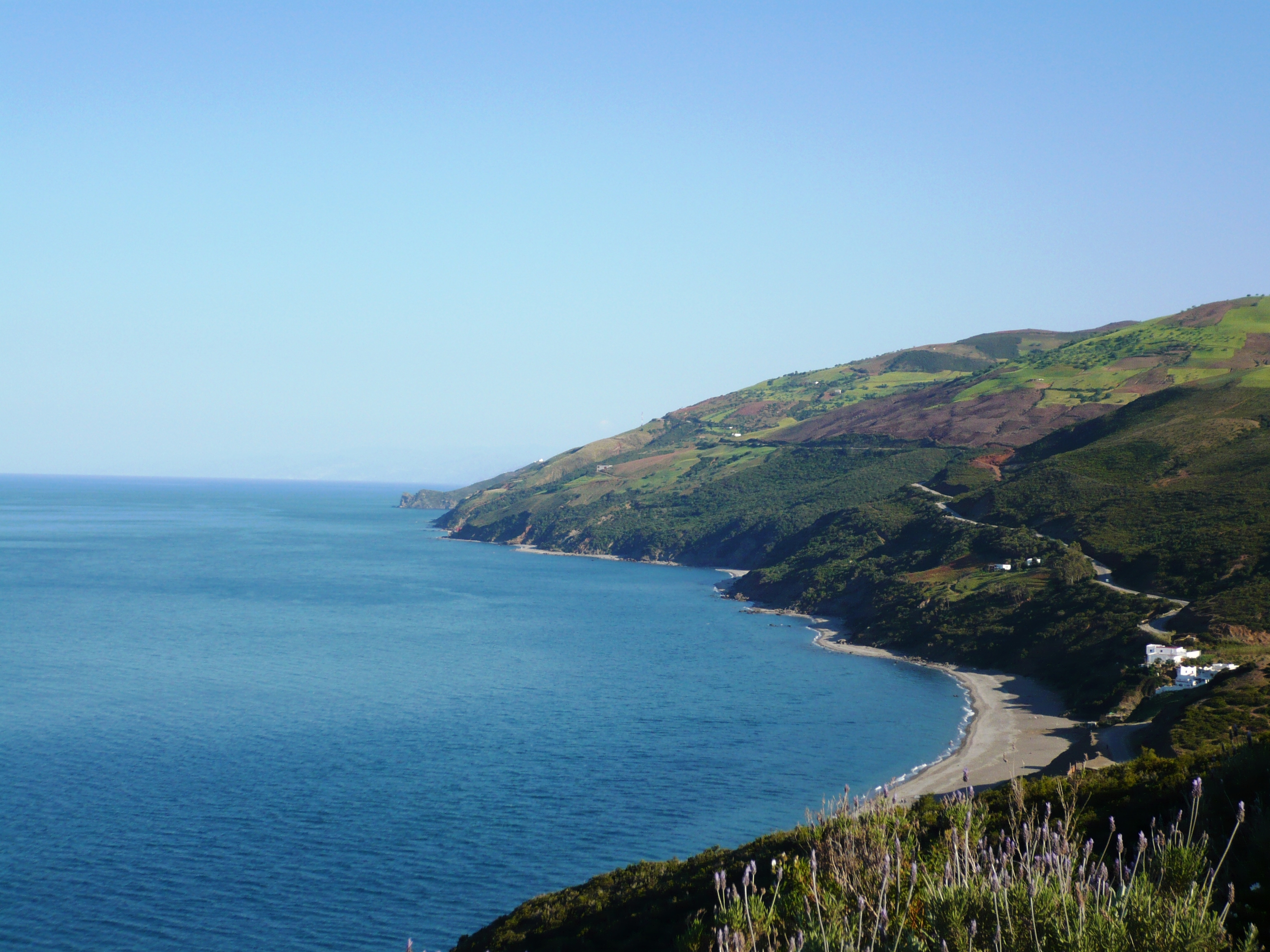
- Interactive map of Oued Laou
- Coordinates: 35°27′N 5°6′W
- Country: Morocco
- Region: Tanger-Tetouan-Al Hoceima
- Province: Tétouan

Population (2004)
  - Total: 8,383
- Time zone: UTC+0 (GMT)
- Postal code: 93252

Oued Laou (Arabic: واد لاو) is a small coastal city located in Tétouan Province in northern Morocco on the Mediterranean coast. The two main cities nearby are Tetouan to the northwest and Chefchaouen to the southwest. In 2024 the city had 11 838 inhabitants.

== Description ==
The city draws its name from the Laou river, a small watercourse that empties in the Mediterranean.

The river is 65 km long and its headwaters are located near Bab Bered in the western Rif Mountains; it passes near Chefchaouen before receiving water from its tributaries such as Akchour. The average flow of the river is 12 m3/s and drains an area of about 1,000 km2.

Oued Laou was mentioned by Pliny the Elder as flumen Laud and described it as navigable: flumen Laud et ipsum navigiorum capax (river Laud, which is also navigable for vessels).

The river Laou forms a fertile valley as it approaches its mouth; the valley is known for its fruit orchards.
