= Tuhami al-Wazzani =

Moroccan historian

Tuhami al-Wazzani (1903–1972) was a Moroccan historian from Tétouan. He is especially well known for his autobiography Al-Zawiyya. This book was first published in episodes in the magazine Al-Rif (founded by him August 27, 1936), beginning in 1939. Al-Wazzani translated Cervantes' Don Quixote into Arabic.
