= Instituto Español Nuestra Señora del Pilar =

Instituto Español Nuestra Señora del Pilar Arabic: مدرسة العذراء سیدتنا بیلار
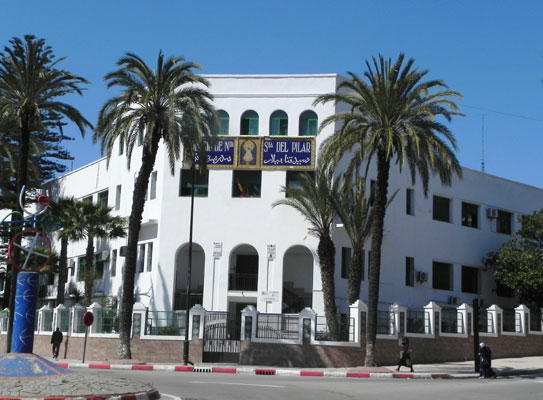

Location
- Tétouan; Morocco

Information
- School type: International School
- Established: 1914
- Founder: Francisco Javier Delmas
- Language: Spanish

Instituto Español Nuestra Señora del Pilar (Arabic: مدرسة العذراء سیدتنا بیلار) is a Spanish international secondary school in Tétouan, Morocco. Operated by the Spanish Ministry of Education, it serves obligatory secondary education (middle school) and bachillerato (senior high school).

It was first founded by Francisco Javier Delmas, a Marianist, in 1914.

The center offers compulsory secondary education and baccalaureate programs in science and humanities, based on the Spanish curriculum with adaptations to the social environment of Morocco (in addition to the Spanish curriculum, all students study Arabic at all levels).
