= Instituto Español Juan de la Cierva =

- Arabic: المعهد الإسباني خوان دي لا سیوفا بتطوان; French: Institut Espagnol Juan de la Cierva
- Tétouan; Morocco

Information
- School type: International School
- Language: Spanish

Instituto Español Juan de la Cierva (Arabic: المعهد الإسباني خوان دي لا سیوفا بتطوان; French: Institut Espagnol Juan de la Cierva) is a Spanish international secondary school in Tétouan, Morocco. Operated by the Spanish Ministry of Education, as per Decree 3533/70 of 3 December it is a vocational school.
