= Mohamed Yalouh =

Moroccan inventor

- Born: Mohamed Yalouh; January 12, 2005 (age 21); Morocco
- Organization: The International Federation of Inventors' Associations
- Known for: Hexa-Stroke Engine

Mohamed Yalouh is a Moroccan inventor known for his works in Artificial Intelligence, Machine Learning, and Engineering. He won the International Invention Innovation Competition in Canada (iCAN) in 2020. Yalouh's Hexa-Stroke Engine was named the invention with the best design and conceptualized representation. He won numerous other titles from innovation expositions and contests around the world, such as the International Innovation & Invention Competition in Taiwan. Yalouh was recently recognized on IFIA's list of notable inventors for his innovations.

== Early life ==
Yalouh was born in Tetuan, Morocco and currently lives in Abu Dhabi, United Arab Emirates where he attends the American Community School of Abu Dhabi.

He co-founded Waind, a student-led research and development project aimed at exploring innovative solutions to global problems through Artificial Intelligence, Machine Learning, and Computer Vision. The startup aims to build a R&D network of student communities worldwide to explore new hard-tech innovations.

== Career ==
At 14 years old, Mohamed learned about different elements of Automotive and Mechanical Engineering. At 15 years old, he drafted his own patent application for “The Hexa-Stroke Engine” (H.R.R.E). This invention is a 6-stroke and multi-powerstroke diesel automotive engine, predominantly relating to Felix Wankel’s Triangle Rotary Engine from 1954. Yalouh's H.R.R.E stands distinctive with few similar models. Some of the features it possesses include low fuel consumption, powerful coordinated power strokes, lighter in weight, environment friendly, lower weight-to-power ratios, neutral temperature across its housing, and so on. These were set to bring a conceptual, innovative solution to minimize emissions and reduce the carbon footprint, and yet perform more efficiently with an overall far exceeding performance than its previous versions.
