= M'diq-Fnideq Prefecture =

M'diq-Fnideq المضيق - الفنيدق
- Prefecture
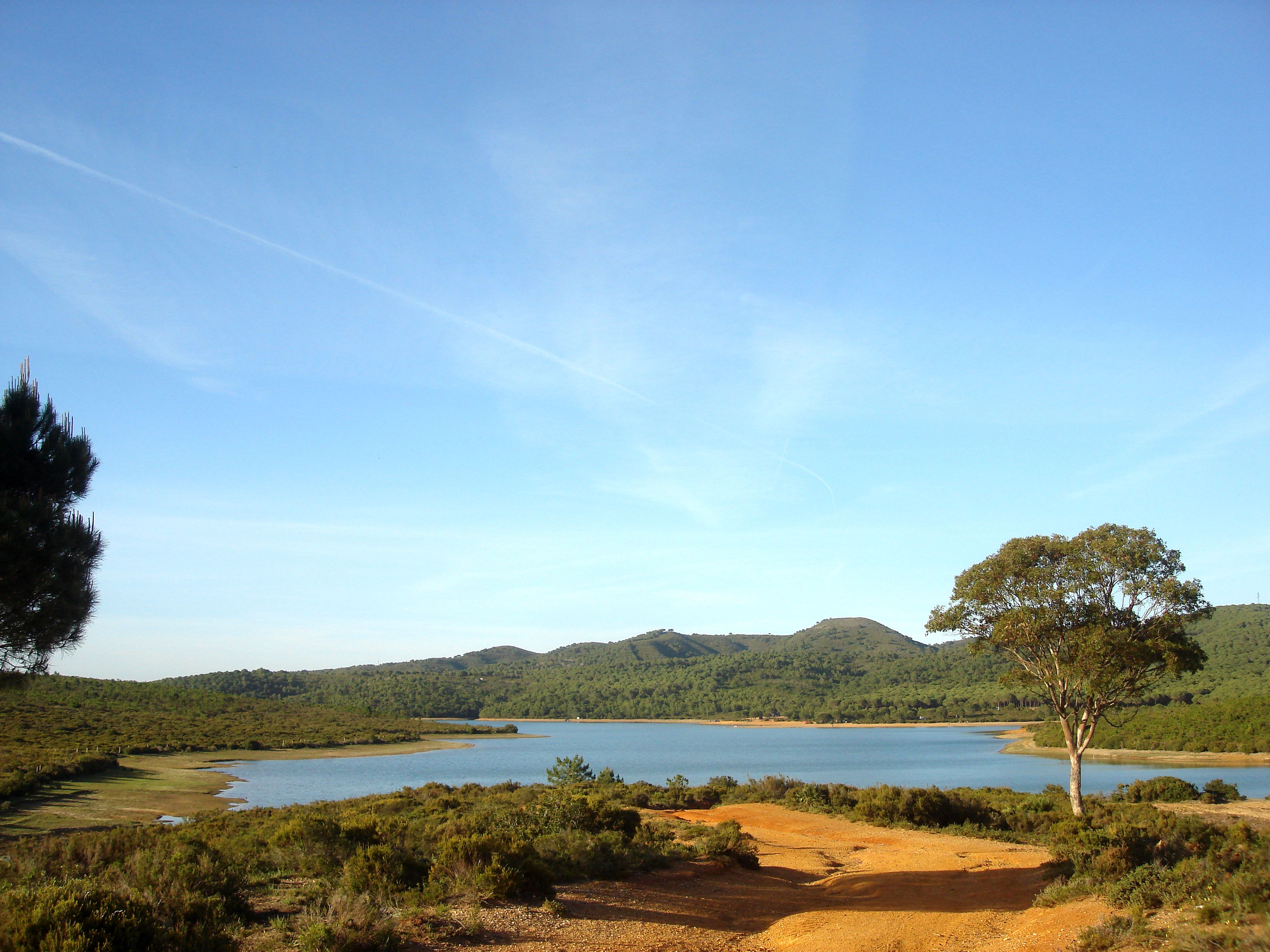
- Smir Dam
- Interactive map of M'diq-Fnideq
- Coordinates: 35°41′29″N 5°19′55″W
- Country: Morocco
- Region: Tanger-Tetouan-Al Hoceima
- Created: 2004
- Seat: M'diq

Government
  - Governor: Yassine Jari

Area
  - Total: 178.5 km^{2} (68.9 sq mi)

Population (2024)
  - Total: 254,064
  - Density: 1,423/km^{2} (3,686/sq mi)
- Time zone: UTC+0 (GMT)

M'diq-Fnideq (Arabic: المضيق - الفنيدق) is a prefecture in Tanger-Tetouan-Al Hoceima, Morocco. It covers an area of 178.5 square kilometres (68.9 sq mi) and recorded a population of 254,064 in the 2024 Moroccan census. The seat of the prefecture is M'diq.

The Prefecture is an almost continuous seaside resort, with the major cities and towns being :

- Martil
- Cabo Negro
- M'diq
- Fnideq
- Belyounech

== Geography ==
M'diq-Fnideq borders Fahs-Anjra Province to the west, Tétouan Province to the south, the Mediterranean Sea to the east, the Spanish exclave of Ceuta to the northeast and the Strait of Gibraltar to the north. Jebel Musa, located in the northern part of the prefecture, is its highest point at 851 metres. The coastline at the base of Jebel Musa is a Ramsar site, and this area and portions of the mountainous interior are part of the Intercontinental Biosphere Reserve of the Mediterranean.

The prefecture is drained by five wadis or seasonal rivers: Oued Smir, Oued Negro, Oued Fnideq, Oued Rmel and Oued Martil. The coastal lagoon of Oued Smir and its reservoir upstream were designated a Ramsar site in 2019.

The prefecture experiences a Mediterranean climate. The easterly prevailing wind in the prefecture is known as the chergui.

== History ==
M'diq-Fnideq was created in 2004 from the municipalities of M'diq and Fnideq and the rural commune of Allyene, all formerly part of Tétouan Province. Martil was annexed to the prefecture from Tétouan Province in 2010.

== Government ==
The following people have served as governors of M'diq-Fnideq:

- Mohamed Yacoubi, 2005–2010
- Abdelmajid Hankari, 2010–2012
- Mohamed Mrabet, 2012–2014
- Abdelkrim Hamdi, 2014–2016
- Hassan Bouya, 2016–2018
- Yassine Jari, 2018–

=== Subdivisions ===
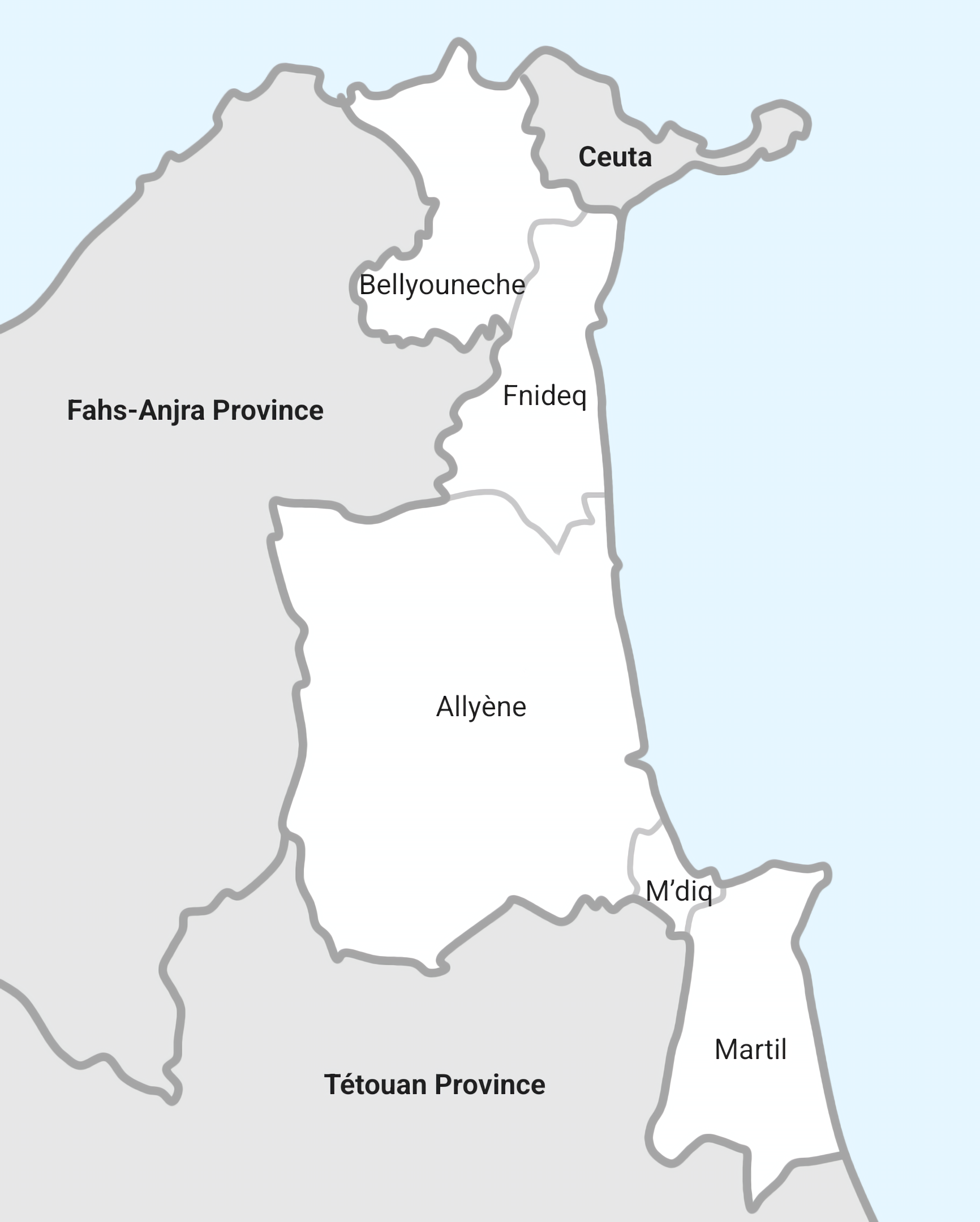
Communes of M'diq-Fnideq Prefecture

M'diq-Fnideq comprises three urban communes, M'Diq, Fnideq and Martil; and two rural communes, Allyene and Belyounech.

== Infrastructure ==
The Tetouan–Fnideq expressway connects Tetouan with M'Diq and Fnideq and was opened in 2008.

First built in the 1970s, the port at M'Diq was expanded in 2009 and 2012 to accommodate recreational and fishing activities. In 2012 it ranked third by tonnage of fish landed among fishing ports in Tanger-Tetouan-Al Hoceima.

From 1918 to 1958, a railway connecting Tetouan and Ceuta ran through M'diq and Fnideq.

The Smir Dam, located west of M'diq, was built in 1991. It has a capacity of 40.7 million cubic metres and supplies potable and industrial water to the prefecture.

Three of the eleven schools affiliated with Abdelmalek Essaâdi University are located in Martil: the Poly-disciplinary Faculty, the École Normale Supérieure, and the Faculty of Letters and Humanities.

The prefecture has two hospitals at M'diq and Fnideq.
