= Jebel Zem-Zem =

Mountain in Morocco

Jebel Zem-Zem جبل زمزم
- Location within Morocco

Highest point
- Elevation: 435 m (1,427 ft)
- Coordinates: 35°44′N 05°21′W

Geography
- Location: Morocco
- Parent range: Atlas Mountains

Climbing
- First ascent: Unknown
- Easiest route: From M'diq or Fnideq

Jebel Zem-Zem (Spanish: Monte Sem-Sem) is the name given to a mountain located north of M'diq below Fnideq in northern Morocco below the Spanish enclave of Ceuta. It is 3 kilometres (2 mi) south west of the tourist resort Punta Restinga on the eastern coast. On its northern lower slopes lies an abandoned and ruined fort called Fortín Negrón.
