= Narrow-gauge railways in former Spanish Morocco =

There have been narrow-gauge railways which used 1,000 mm (3 ft 3 3/8 in), 750 mm (2 ft 5 1/2 in) and 600 mm (1 ft 11 5/8 in) gauges.

The older rail network was in Melilla–Nador area, only later to join with another, the Ceuta–Tetuan railway line and short harbour construction lines at the Larache Harbour on the Atlantic seaboard.

After the Treaty of Algeciras signed in April 1906, where the northern part of Morocco was placed under Spanish administration, the Spanish started to develop this mineral-rich area. The Spanish Line (Compañía Transatlántica Española) had been formed in Spain as early as in 1881 by Spanish businessman Antonio López y López. The main idea was to develop the harbours in northern Morocco to carry more Spanish–Moroccan trade via harbours of Larache, Tanger, Ceuta and Melilla.

== Melilla area ==
=== Junta de Obras del Puerto de Melilla ===
At Melilla the Junta de Obras del Puerto de Melilla started at ones extensive building of harbour to carry mineral traffic overseas, mainly to Spain. With new harbour installations the company built also 750 mm (2 ft 5 1/2 in) gauge local 4.1 km harbour line from Melilla Harbour to Sidi-Musa, later extended to the total length of 7 km as demanded by Spanish military.

The Junta de Obras and the Compañía Transatlántica were merged to form a new company, the Junta de Fomento de Melilla in December 1911.

=== Compañía Española de Minas del Rif ===
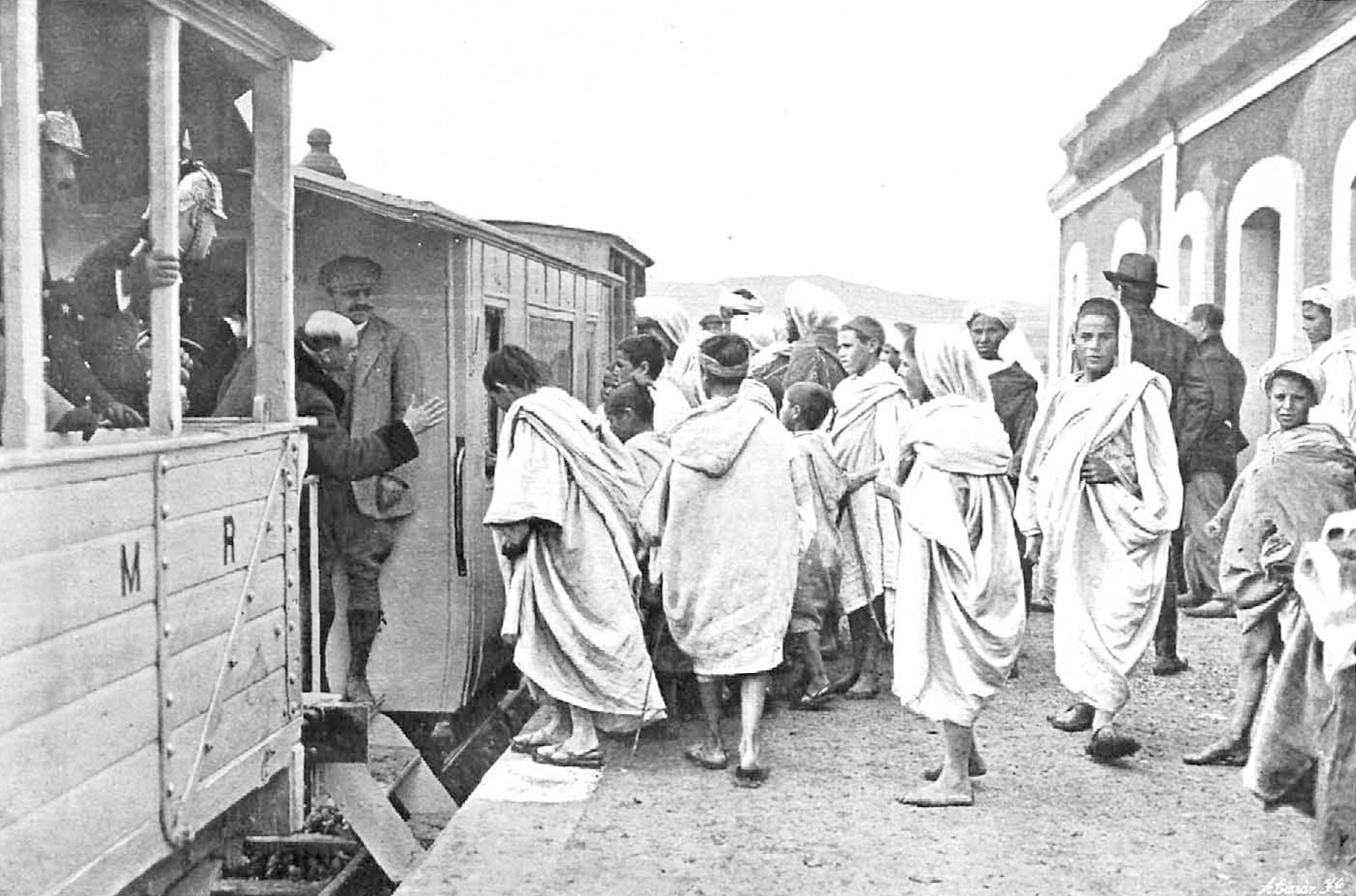
Segangan station in 1911

The Compañía Española de Minas del Rif was founded in July 1908. It had obtained mining rights at Idem, Beni-Sidel and Mazuza areas. The company built an extensive railway network in the Melilla area. The 1,000 mm (3 ft 3 3/8 in) gauge main line Melilla–Beni Ensar–Tizi Tavessart–Atalayon–Nador–Segangan–San Juan de las Minas–Minas de Jebel Uisai (Ulad Canem) 31,5 km was the first common carrier railway in Spanish Morocco between Melilla and San Juan de las Minas.

In spring 1914 the Compañía Española de Minas del Rif operated three daily passenger trains to Nador of which two continued to San Juan de las Minas with corresponding return workings to Melilla.

=== Ferrocarril Nador–Tistutin ===
Another company, the Ferrocarril Nador–Tistutin, built a 1,000 mm gauge 36 km Nador–Tinequemart–Zeluan–Monte Arruit–Tistutin–El Batel line.

There was continuous unrest in the area and the Rif Cabyle rebellionists attacked against the railways. The Spanish Army concentrated nearly 100.000 soldiers to pacify the Rif area and built extensions westward from:

- El Batel to Laababda and Zoco el Had
- El Batel to Ben Tiep
- Laababda to Dar Tafersit

The lines were operated by locotractors which could haul 200 tons with three locotractors.

Later, it had been decided to be built to standard 600 mm (1 ft 11 5/8 in) gauge field railways and the Spanish Army bought a number of surplus former German built World War I locomotives and rolling stock from Germany. The following lines were constructed:

- El Batel–Dar Driuch 23.5 km
- El Batel–Ulad Candussi–Dar Quebdani 23 km
- Dar Driuch–Tafersit 12 km

When the area was finally pacified in 1926 the lines were lifted and the rolling stock transferred elsewhere.

=== Compañía del Norte Africano and the Compañía Minera Setolazar ===
There were also two other companies which operated their own mining railways. The Compañía del Norte Africano and the Compañía Minera Setolazar, both of 600 mm (1 ft 11 5/8 in) gauge. Both companies had a common locomotive shed at Beni Ensar. Their 600 mm gauge line run parallel with Compañía Española de Minas del Rif 1,000 mm (3 ft 3 3/8 in) gauge line between Nador and Melilla Harbour.

=== Compañía del Norte Africano ===
Compañía del Norte Africano 600 mm (1 ft 11 5/8 in) gauge industrial railway served the lead mines at Monte Afra with company's Melilla–Nador–Monte Afra line on the north coast. This company was founded in August 1907. The length of this lead carrier was 19 km.

== Ceuta area ==
=== Ferrocarril Ceuta–Benzu (Junta de Obras del Puerto de Ceuta) ===
Farther west the Junta de Obras del Puerto de Ceuta was founded in October 1904. It built Ceuta Harbour and later a short branch line from Ceuta to nearby Benzú. The company used 1,000 mm (3 ft 3 3/8 in) gauge line.

=== Ferrocarril Ceuta–Tetuan ===
The Ferrocarril Ceuta–Tetuan was founded in September 1912 to connect Ceuta to Tetuan with 41 km 1,000 mm (3 ft 3 3/8 in) gauge railway. The line was opened March 1918. Ferrocarril Ceuta–Tetuan built stations at Ceuta (0.5 km), Miramar (2.9 km), Castillejos 8.0 km), Dar Riffen (11.1 km), Negro (13.8 km), Rincon del Medik (24.9 km), Malalien (38.1 km), and terminal station Tetuan (41.0 km).

=== Ferrocarril Tetuan–Rio Martin y prolongaciones ===
When Spanish General Alfau occupied Tetuan in 1913 it was decided to build an 18 km 600 mm (1 ft 11 5/8 in) gauge railway to Rio Martin using the trackbed of the former lifted standard-gauge railway. The 10 km Ferrocarril Tetuan–Rio Martin y prolongaciones was opened in May 1915 for public service. The extensions south to Benkarrir and Zina 18 km was opened in March 1921 and west to Laucien 8 km, when the railway bridge at Mogote was finally completed, on the same day.

== Larache area ==
=== Larache harbour installations ===
The Austrian company Sager & Wörner had obtained from the Spanish Government the contract to build the harbour installations at Larache on the Atlantic coast in 1911. The harbour was built in 1911–1914 with a 600 mm (1 ft 11 5/8 in) railway but World War I delayed the 34 km standard-gauge railway line to Larache to 1922.

== Narrow-gauge locomotives delivered to former Spanish Morocco ==
ALCo

- 6 ALCo 1,000 mm (3 ft 3 3/8 in) 2C-h2 17x20, built 1917, 48 Delivered to the Spanish Colonies

Avonside

- Avonside 1,000 mm (3 ft 3 3/8 in) Ct-n2, built 1906, ex FC de Sierra Nevada, sold to Minas del Rif " MELILLA "

Borsig

- 1 Borsig 600 mm (1 ft 11 5/8 in) Bt-n2, built 1906 Arthur Koppel AG, Berlin f. Tanger, Marokko
- 2 Borsig 1,000 mm (3 ft 3 3/8 in) 1Ct-n2, built 1911, Ferrocarril Nador–Tistutin No 1 " TISTUTIN "

Carels

- 1 Carels 750 mm (2 ft 5 1/2 in) Ctr-n2, built 1887, ex Baix Emporda, Tranvia del Bajo Ampurdan a Palamos No 2 -> FC Minas del Rif

CUA

- 2 Couillet 600 mm (1 ft 11 5/8 in), Bt-n2, built 1899, ex Chemins de Fer Espagne sp. Maroc, Melilla
- 2 CUA (Christop & Unmack Aktiengesellschaft)1,000 mm (3 ft 3 3/8 in), B´2 Motor wagon, built 1943, f. Ferrocarril Ceuta a Tetuan

Deutz

- Deutz, 750 mm (2 ft 5 1/2 in), B type ML 116-Tr, built 1925, Compania Espanola de Minas del Rif
- 5 Deutz, 750 mm, B type ML 128-F, built 1925–1926, Compania Espanola de Minas del Rif
- 4 Deutz, 750 mm, B type MLH228-F, built 1927–1928, Compania Espanola de Minas del Rif
- 8 Deutz, 750 mm, B type MLH233-F built 1928–1929, Compania Espanola de Minas del Rif
- 3 Deutz, 750 mm, B type MLH230-F built 1930, Compania Espanola de Minas del Rif
- 7 Deutz, 750 mm, B type MLH332-F, built 1934–1938, Compania Espanola de Minas del Rif
- 1 Deutz, 1,000 mm (3 ft 3 3/8 in), BB type OMD130-F, built 1934, Compania Espanola de Minas del Rif No 301
- 2 Deutz, 750 mm, B type GG66-B, built 1965, Compania Espanola de Minas del Rif

Falcon

- Falcon 144 / 1887 1000 C-n2 originally Ct-n2 origin unknown 1909 to FC Nador–Tistutin No 6 " EUSKALLERIA "

General Motors

- 2 General Motors, 1,000 mm (3 ft 3 3/8 in), CoCo type GL22CU, built 1971, Societe d´Exploitation des Mines du Rif

Henschel

- 20 Henschel, 600 mm (1 ft 11 5/8 in), Bt-n2, built 1918, ex Tigris Kriegsbahn delivered in 1921 to Spanish Morocco
- 2 Henschel, 1,000 mm (3 ft 3 3/8 in), 1C1t-n2, built 1920, Minas del Rif, Melilla
- 3 Henschel, 1,000 mm, 1D1t-n2, built 1921, Minas del Rif
- 3 Henschel, 600 mm, Dt-n2, built 1922, Metallges. Frankfurt am Main for Spanish Morocco
- 2 Henschel, 1,000 mm, Ct-n2, built 1922, Metallges. Frankfurt am Main for Spanish Morocco, for FC Nador–Tistutin
- 1 Henschel, 750 mm (2 ft 5 1/2 in), Ct-n2, built 1923, Minas del Rif No 11, Spanish Morocco
- 1 Henschel, 1,000 mm, 2D2t-n2, built 1924, Minas del Rif, No 203 Melilla, Spanish Morocco
- 2 Henschel, 600 mm, Dt-n2, built 1924–1925, Spanish Morocco
- 3 Henschel, 1,000 mm, Ct-n2, built 1925, Delegation de Romento, Spanish Morocco
- 1 Henschel, 1,000 mm, Bt-n2, built 1925, Delegation de Romento, Spanish Morocco
- 2 Henschel, 600 mm, Dt-n2, built 1928, Ferr. Sideguza, Madrid for Spanish Morocco
- 3 Henschel, 750 mm, Ct-n2, built 1928–1929, Minas del Rif, Spanish Morocco
- 2 Henschel, 1,000 mm, 2D2t-n2, built 1934, Minas del Rif, Spanish Morocco

Kerr Stuart

- 2 Kerr Stuart, 1,000 mm (3 ft 3 3/8 in), 1C-n2, built 1911–1912, Minas del Rif

Krauss-Maffei

- 2Krauss, 750 mm (2 ft 5 1/2 in), Ctr-n2, built 1887, ex Tram Bajo Amburdan–sold Minas del Rif
- 4 Krauss, 600 mm (1 ft 11 5/8 in), Bt-n2, built 1911–1912, Sager & Wörner, Munchen f. Hafenbau Larache, Spanisch Marokko

MAN

- 2 MAN, 1,000 mm (3 ft 3 3/8 in), B´2 Motor wagon, built 1955, for Ferrocarril Ceuta a Tetuan No 1

Manning Wardle

- 2 Manning Wardle, 1,000 mm (3 ft 3 3/8 in), Ct-n2, built 1915, Minas del Rif

MTM

- 2 MTM, 1,000 mm (3 ft 3 3/8 in), 1C-n2, built 1913, Ferrocarril Nador (MTM = La Maqiunista Terreatre y Maritima SA, Barcelona)

La Meuse

- 5 La Meuse, 600 mm (1 ft 11 5/8 in), 1D-n2, built 1929, S.A. Minera Setolazar, Maroc Espagne
- 2 La Meuse, 1,000 mm (3 ft 3 3/8 in), Dt-n2, built 1941, built for Krauss–Maffei for Spanish Morocco
- 1 La Meuse, 600 mm (1 ft 11 5/8 in), B, built 1957, Compania Minera Setolazar, Beni Enzar, Melilla

Orenstein & Koppel

- 2 Orenstein & Koppel, 750 mm (2 ft 5 1/2 in), Bt-n2, built 1907, Obras del Puerto Melilla
- 2 Orenstein & Koppel, 600 mm (1 ft 11 5/8 in), Dt-n2+2T, built 1912, Mining exploration Massenet KLA Compania del Norte Africano
- 1 Orenstein & Koppel, 600 mm, Bt-n2, built 1909, Messenet Marokko
- 1 Orenstein & Koppel, 1,000 mm (3 ft 3 3/8 in), built 1909, Minas del Rif, Melilla, Spanish Morocco
- 1 Orenstein & Koppel, 1,000 mm, built 1911, Compania Espanola de Minas del Rif
- 1 Orenstein & Koppel, 600 mm, built 1911, Compania Transatlantice, Melilla, Spanish Morocco
- 1 Orenstein & Koppel, 750 mm, built 1911, Junta del Torento de Melilla, Spanish Morocco
- 1 Orenstein & Koppel, 1,000 mm, built 1912, Empresa Constructora del Puerto de Ceuta, Marokko " CEUTA 1 "
- 1 Orenstein & Koppel, 600 mm, built 1912, Spanische Regierung (Spanish Morocco)
- 2 Orenstein & Koppel, 1,000 mm, built 1912, F.C. de Nador et Tistutin
- 1 Orenstein & Koppel, 1,000 mm, built 1913, Empresa Constructora del Puerto de Ceuta, Morocco " CEUTA 2 "
- 3 Orenstein & Koppel, 600 mm, built 1913, Spanisches Kriegsministerium Madrid, for Spanish Morocco
- 1 Orenstein & Koppel, 1,000 mm, built 1914, Auststellung Lyon, sp. FC Nador a Tistutin No 5 " NADOR "
- 1 Orenstein & Koppel, 600 mm, Ct-n2, built 1913, Ministerio de la Guerra, Spanish Morocco
- 2 Orenstein & Koppel, 600 mm, built 1913, durch Schneider & Co, nach Marokko
- 2 Orenstein & Koppel, 600 mm, Dt-n2, built 1916, Compania del Norte Africano No 11 " YOUKSEN I "
- 3 Orenstein & Koppel, 600 mm, Bt-n2, built 1919, Transatlantic GmbH, Melilla, Spanisch Marokko
- 4 Orenstein & Koppel, 600 mm, Dt-n2+2T, built 1922, Kriegsministerium Madrid, f. Spanisch Marokko
- 1 Orenstein & Koppel, 600 mm, Ct-n2, built 1922, Kolonialministerium Madrid, f. Spanisch Marokko
- 1 Orenstein & Koppel, 1,000 mm, Ct-n2, built 1923, Compania Espanola de Minas del Rif, Span. Marokko
- 3 Orenstein & Koppel, 1,000 mm, Bt-n2, built 1925, Empresa Constructora Puerto de Ceuta
- 1 Orenstein & Koppel, 600 mm, Bt-n2, built 1929, Compania Espanola de Minas del Rif, Marokko
- 1 Orenstein & Koppel, 1,000 mm, Ct-n2, built 1931, Ste Nationale d´Travaux Publics, Ceuta, Morocco
- 1 Orenstein & Koppel, 600 mm, built 1938, S.A. Minera Setolazar, Bilbao f. Spanish Morocco
- 1 Orenstein & Koppel, 600 mm, MVO B, built 1955, Compania Espanola de Minas del Rif

== Literature ==
- Jose Manuel Vidal Perez & Joan Alberich Gonzales: Los Ferrocarriles en Protectoradas y Colonias Espanolas en Africa ISBN 84-930930-9-2
- E.D.Brant: Railways in North Africa ISBN 0-7153-5254-7
- A.E.Durrant, A.A.Jorgensen, C.P.Lewis: Steam in Africa ISBN 0-600-34946-2
- Klaus Fricks, Roland Bude, Martin Murray: O&K Steam Locomotives Works List 1892–1945 ISBN 0-9506092-3-4
- Bernhard Schmeiser: Krauss-Lokomotiven ISBN 3-900134-36-7
- Unpublished locomotive builder lists (mostly originally compiled by Dr. Ing. Bernhard Schmeiser and added with later obtained supplementary information)
- American Locomotive Company (ALCo) Works List (Harward Business School copy 1948)
- Anjubault / Corpet Louvet Works List
- Baldwin Works List (copy 1833–1956 compiled from original Baldwin order list)
- Batignolles Châtillon, Nantes, St. Joseph Works List
- Borsig Works List
- A.Cail Works List
- Carels Works List
- Chrzanów Works List
- Couillet Works List
- Decauville Works List
- Elsässische Maschinenbau Gesellschaft / Societe Alsacienne de Construction Mecaniques Belfort, Graffenstaden, Mulhouse Works List
- Esslingen Works List
- Falcon Works List
- Fives Lille Works List
- Gouin / Batignolles Works List
- Henschel Works List
- Jung Works List
- Kerr Stuart & Co, LD Works List by Frank Jux 1991
- J.A.Maffei Works List
- La Meuse Works List
- Etablissement A. Pinguely Works List
- Schneider & Cie, Le Creusot Works List
- Schwartzkopff (BMAG) Works List
- Tubize Works List
- Weidknecht et Compagnie Works List
