= Belyounech =

Belyounech Beliones
- Rural commune
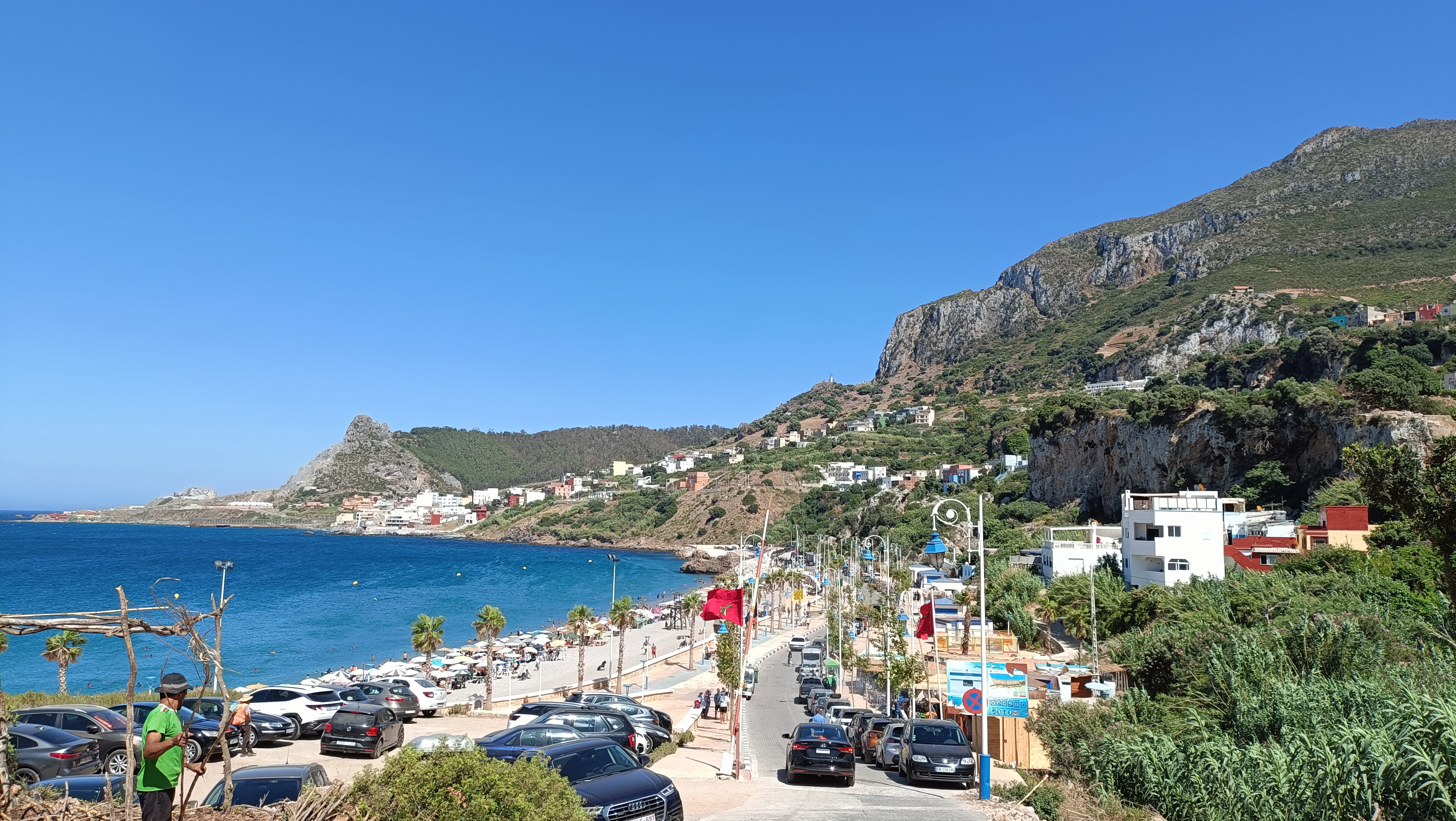
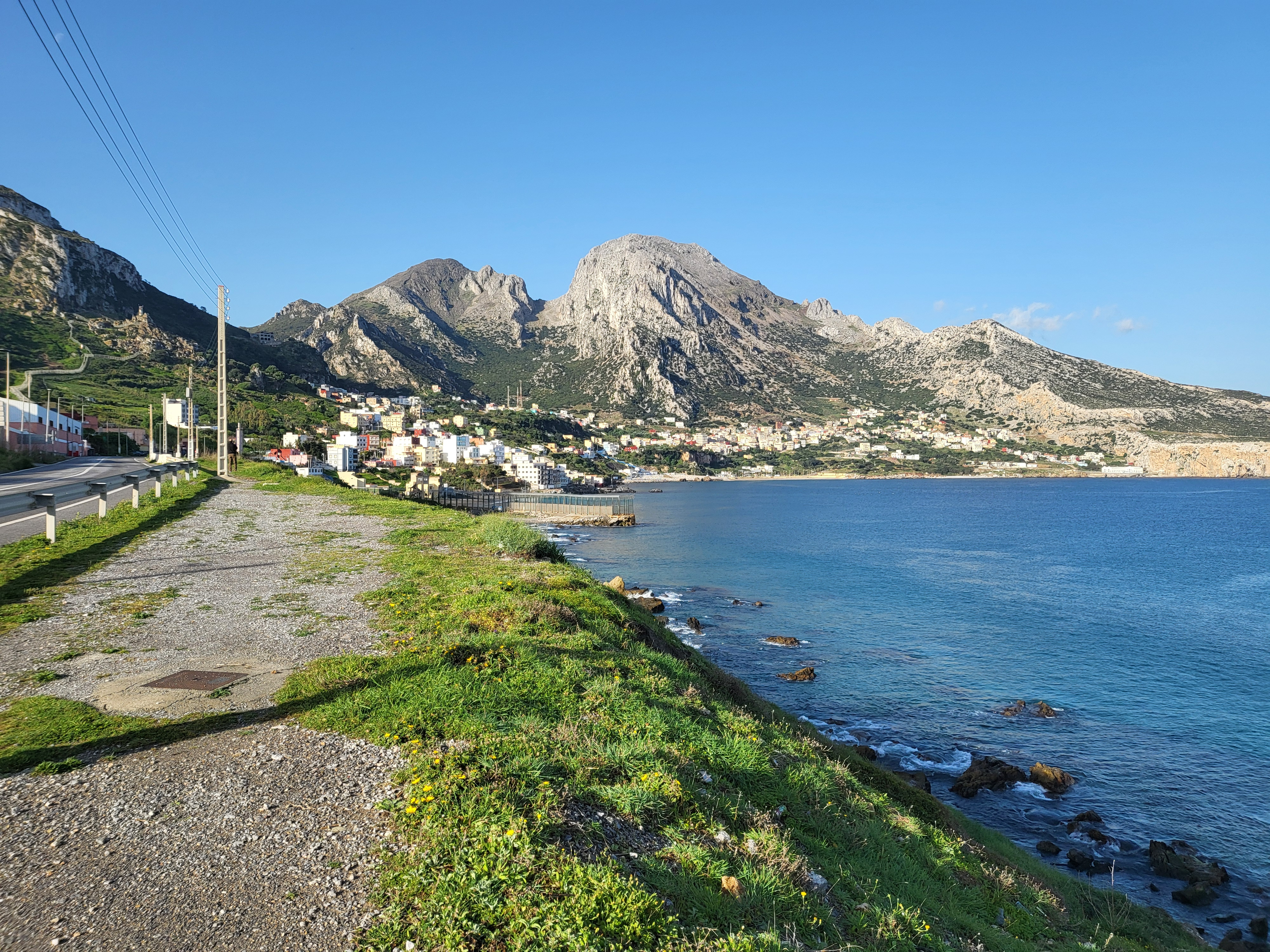
- Belyounech Beach View of the town with "Sleeping Woman" Mountain seen in the background
- Interactive map of Belyounech
- Coordinates: 35°54′17″N 5°23′32″W
- Country: Morocco
- Region: Tanger-Tétouan-Al Hoceïma
- Prefecture: M'diq-Fnideq

Population (2014)
  - Total: 5,296
- Time zone: UTC+0 (GMT)

Belyounech (Spanish: Beliones, Arabic: بليونش) is a town and rural commune in the Tanger-Tétouan-Al Hoceïma region of Morocco. The city has many alternate transliterations, including Beliunech and Bel Younech.

Belyounech borders the community of Benzú in the Spanish autonomous city of Ceuta, and is located 7 kilometres (4.3 miles) from the city of Ceuta. Incidents involving the Ceuta border fence have had people trying to cross the border from the west side of the fence in Belyounech into Ceuta.

The community is a popular stop for people looking to ascend Jebel Musa because it is the nearest town to the base of the mountain.

== History ==
=== Fishing ===
The town has a strong fishing heritage, as it is situated on the coast of the Mediterranean Sea. The first women's fishing cooperative in Morocco is from Belyounech. There are also beaches available for recreation along the waters in Belyounech.

=== World heritage ===
Belyounech was listed on the tentative list of sites considered for UNESCO's World Heritage Site designation in Morocco, but was removed in 1994.

== See also ==
- Fnideq, Morocco, 16 kilometres (9.9 miles) away.
