= Cape Negro =

Cape Negro (French: Cap Negre, "Black Cape") may refer to

- Cape Negro, Tunisia
- Cape Negro, Nova Scotia
- Cabo Negro, Morocco
