= Martil =

Town in Tanger-Tetouan-Al Hoceima, Morocco

Martil مرتيل ⵎⴰⵔⵜⵉⵍ
- City
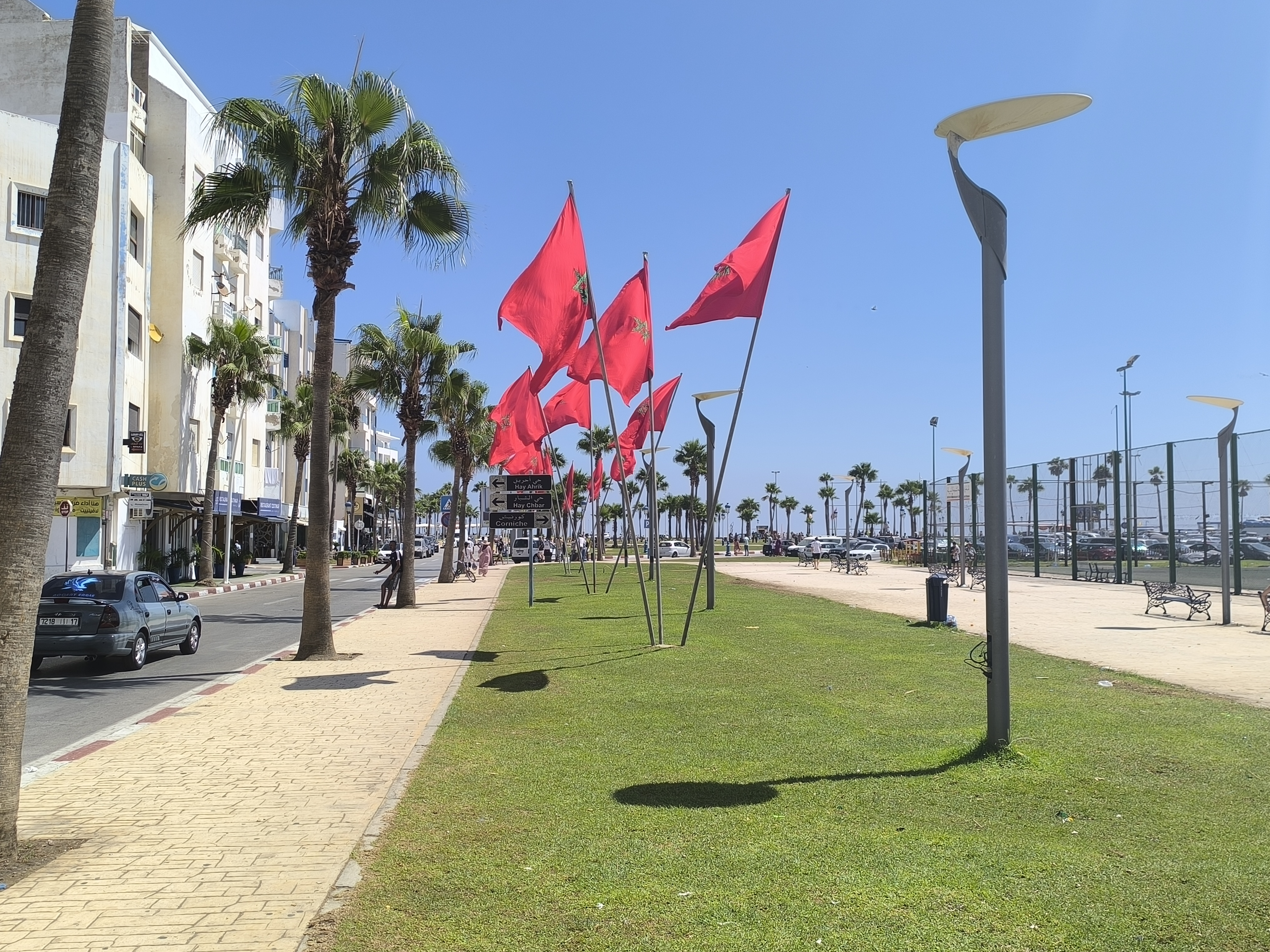
- Interactive map of Martil
- Coordinates: 35°37′N 5°16′W
- Country: Morocco
- Region: Tanger-Tetouan-Al Hoceima
- Prefecture: M'diq-Fnideq

Population (2024)
  - Total: 95,480
- Time zone: UTC+0 (GMT)

Martil (Arabic: مرتيل, romanized: Martīl; Standard Moroccan Tamazight: ⵎⴰⵔⵜⵉⵍ, romanized: Martil) is a coastal city in M'diq-Fnideq Prefecture, Tanger-Tetouan-Al Hoceima region, Morocco. It is located on the Mediterranean Sea northeast of Tetouan.

The name Martil comes from the Spanish name of Río Martín at the time of the Spanish protectorate of Northern Morocco. To the north is the golfing resort of Cabo Negro.
