= Tétouan–Fnideq expressway =

Expressway in Morocco

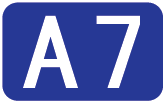
A7 motorway

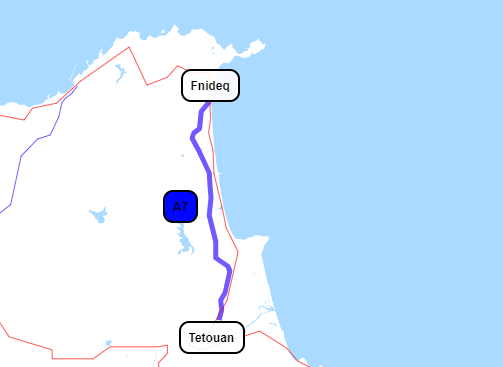

Route information
- Length: 29 km (18 mi)
- Existed: 2007–present
- History: Completed in 2008

Major junctions
- North end: Fnideq
- South end: Tétouan

Location
- Country: Morocco
- Major cities: Tétouan

Highway system
- Transport in Morocco

The Fnideq-Tétouan expressway is an expressway in Morocco. It begins in Morocco's northern city of Fnideq, and connects to the city of Tétouan, totalling 29km in length. The expressway's identity marker is "A7".
