= Ermita de San Antonio =

- Chapel of St. Anthony of Padua
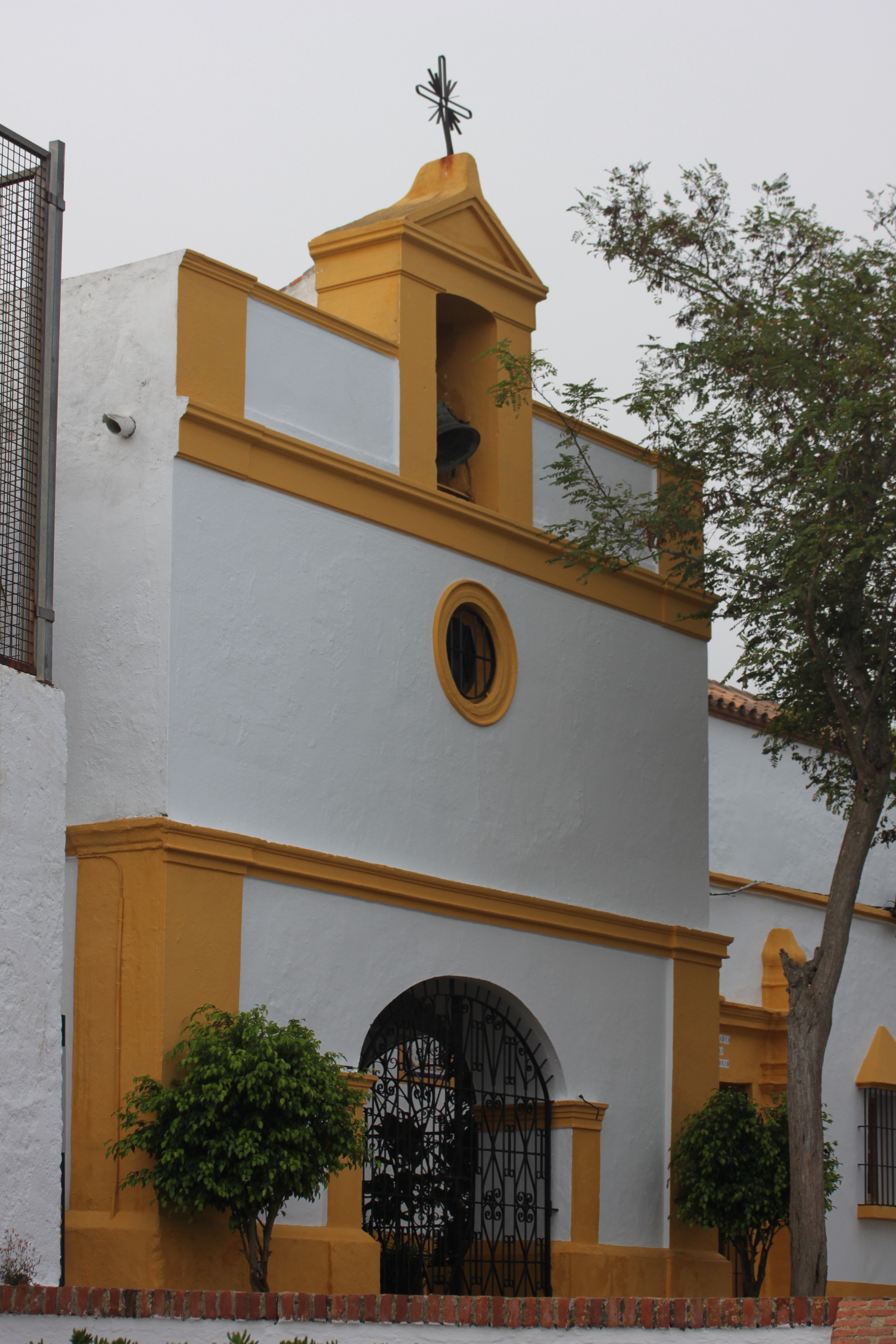
- Ermita de San Antonio
- 35°53′58″N 5°17′38″W
- Location: Ceuta
- Denomination: Roman Catholic

The Ermita de San Antonio de Padua ("Chapel of St. Anthony of Padua") is a chapel located on the slopes of Monte Hacho in Ceuta, one of Spain's cities in the North of Africa.

It was originally built in the 17th century by the Portuguese, but was extensively renovated and reconstructed in the 1960s. A festival is held at the hermitage every June 13 to mark Saint Anthony's Day.
