= Smir Dam =

Dam in Morocco

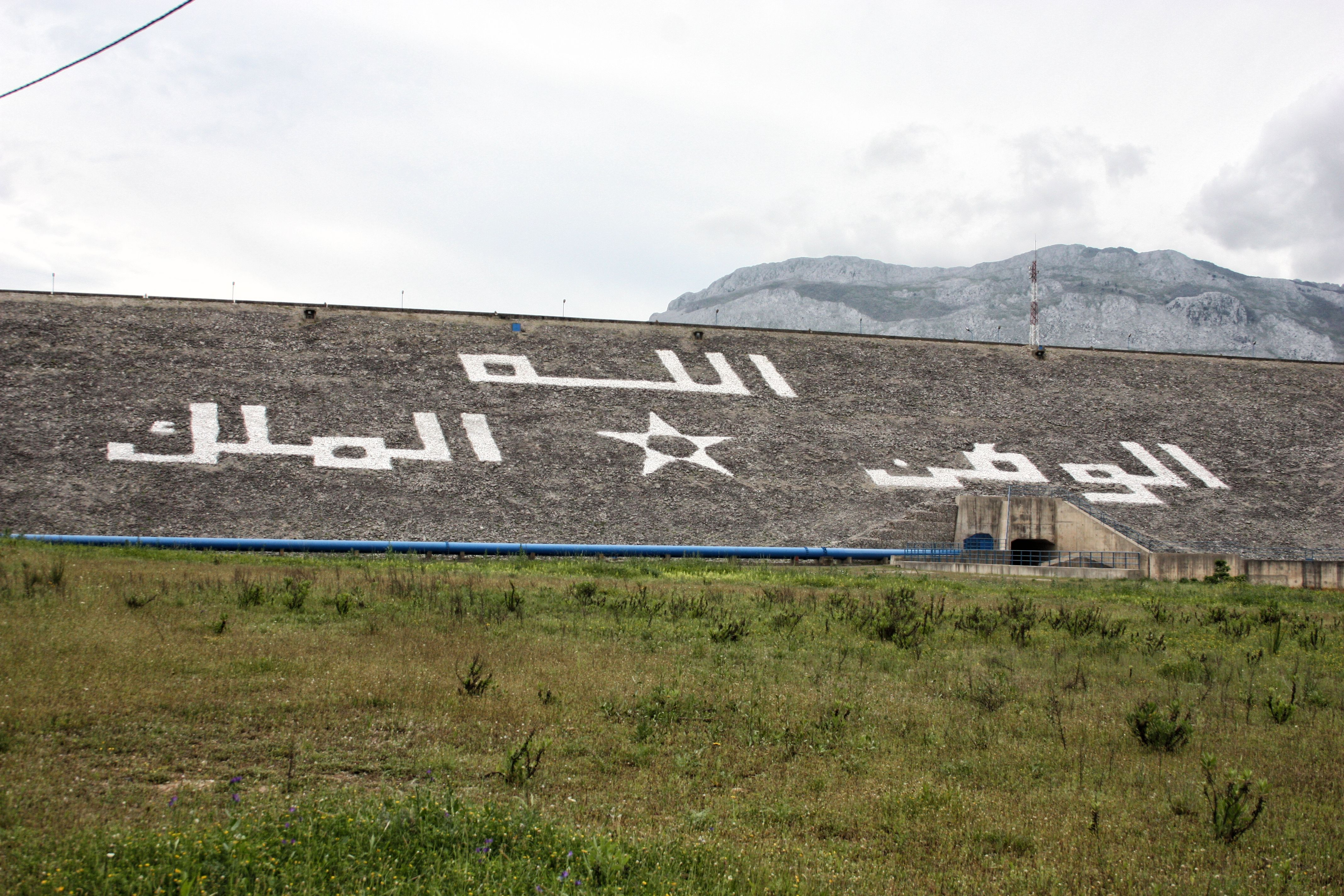
- Interactive map of Smir Dam
- Official name: Smir Barrage
- Country: Morocco
- Location: M'diq
- Coordinates: 35°41′05.73″N 5°23′07.03″W
- Purpose: Water supply, irrigation
- Status: Operational
- Opening date: 1991

Dam and spillways
- Type of dam: Embankment, earth-fill
- Height: 45 m (148 ft)
- Length: 600 m (2,000 ft)
- Dam volume: 710,000 m^{3} (930,000 cu yd)
- Spillway type: Uncontrolled bell-mouth

Reservoir
- Total capacity: 43,500,000 m^{3} (35,300 acre⋅ft)
- Catchment area: 75 km^{2} (29 mi^{2})

Ramsar Wetland
- Official name: Lagune et barrage de Smir
- Designated: 22 May 2019
- Reference no.: 2380

Smir Dam (Arabic: سد أسمير) is an earth-filled embankment dam in northern Morocco, to the southeast of Nakhla Dam and 5 km (3.1 mi) west of M'diq. It is at the confluence of the Smir and El-lile wadis and has a 17 m (56 ft) saddle dam adjacent to the main dam. The primary purpose of the dam is water supply to the city of Tetouan, 12 km (7.5 mi) to the south. The dam was completed in 1991. The reservoir impounded by the dam has been designated as part of a Ramsar site since 2019.
