= Alfau =

Alfau is a surname. Notable people with the surname include:

- Arturo Pellerano Alfau (1864–1935), Dominican merchant, publisher, and journalist
- Felipe Alfau (1902–1999), Spanish-born American novelist and poet
- Luis Ortiz Alfau (1916–2019), Basque militiaman

== See also ==
- Alfa (disambiguation)
