= Monte Hacho =

Mountain in Spain

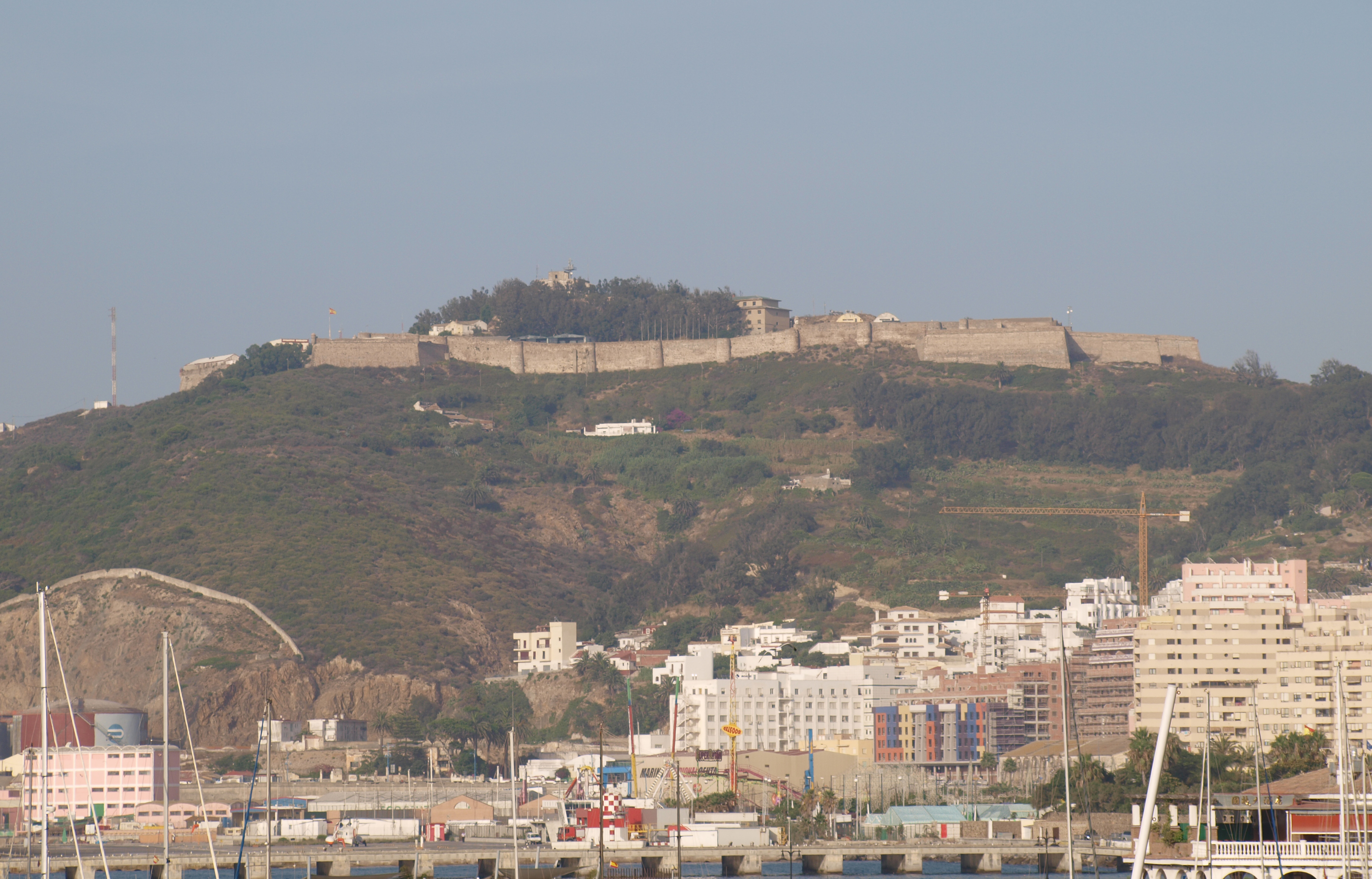
- Monte Hacho, with Ceuta harbour in the foreground. Fortaleza de Hacho can be seen at the top of the hill.

Highest point
- Elevation: 204 m (669 ft)
- Coordinates: 35°54′N 5°17′W

Geography
- Location: Ceuta (Spain)

Monte Hacho is a low mountain that overlooks the Spanish city of Ceuta, on the north coast of the Maghreb. Monte Hacho is positioned on the Mediterranean coast at the Strait of Gibraltar opposite Gibraltar, and along with the Rock of Gibraltar is claimed by some to be one of the Pillars of Hercules (the other southern Pillar candidate being Jebel Musa). According to the legend, Hercules pushed apart the two mountains, and created a link between the Mediterranean and the Atlantic.

During antiquity, Monte Hancho could have been possibly known as Mons Abila (Mount Abila or Abyla); although this title is contested with Morocco’s Jebel Musa.

Monte Hacho is located on the Península de Almina and topped by a fort, the Fortaleza de Hacho, which was first built by the Byzantines, after which the Arabs, the Amazighs, the Portuguese, and the Spaniards added to its construction. It is now occupied by the Spanish army. Monte Hacho also has a convent, Ermita de San Antonio, and it contains Monumento del Llano Amarillo (for Generalisimo Francisco Franco and the start of the Spanish Civil War, which began in Mediterranean North Africa in 1936).
