= Benzú =

- Population unit
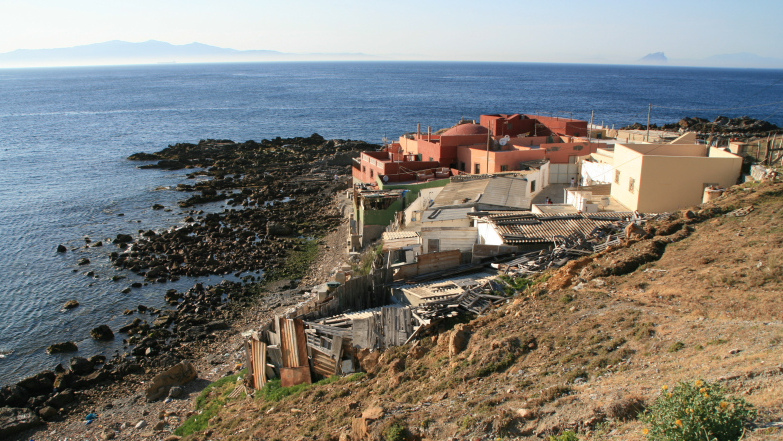

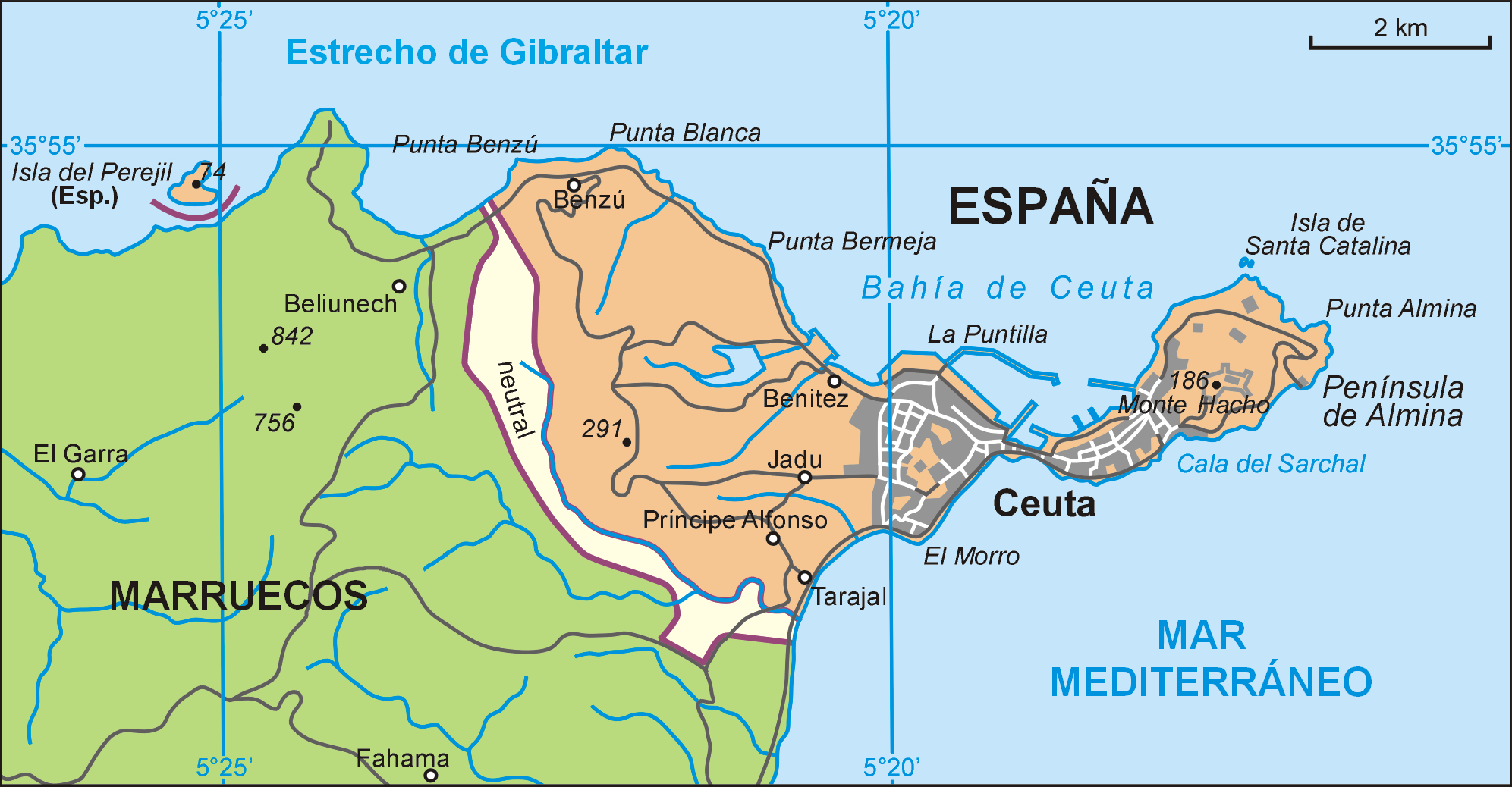
- Location of Benzú within Ceuta

- Location within Spain Location within Morocco
- Coordinates: 35°54′58″N 5°22′23″W
- Country: Spain
- Autonomous city: Ceuta

Population (2019)
  - Total: 1,221
- Demonym(s): Benzueño (male); Benzueña (female)
- Time zone: UTC+1 (CET)
  - Summer (DST): UTC+2 (CEST)
- ISO 3166-2: ES-CE
- Postal code: 51004
- Official language: Spanish

Benzú is a small settlement within the Spanish autonomous city of Ceuta. It has a population of 1,987 according to the 2011 census, divided into two units with Ceuta as its municipality.

== Description ==
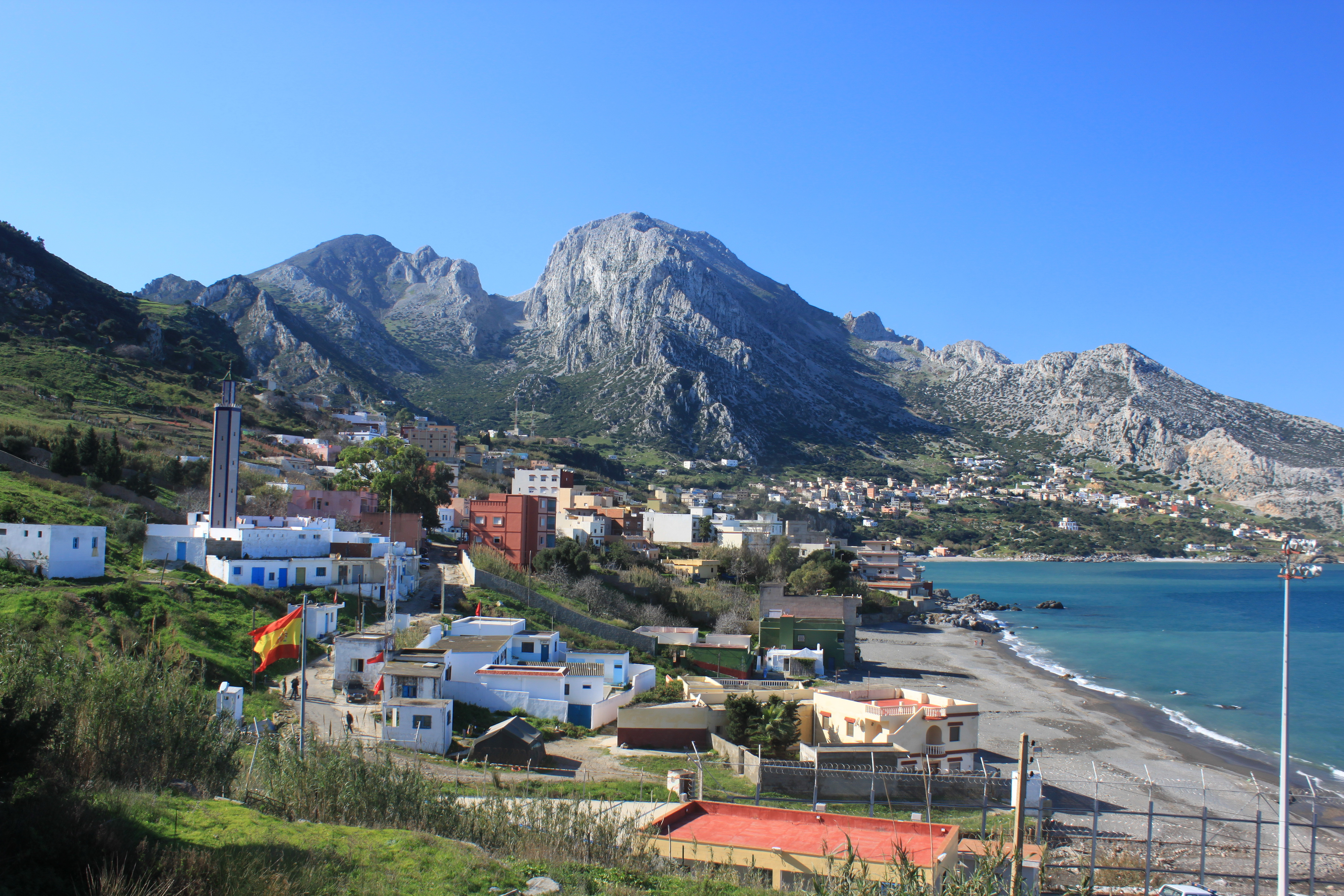
The Moroccan mountain of Jebel Musa, as viewed from Benzú.

Benzú is in the northwest of the Spanish exclave, with a northern coastline of the Mediterranean Sea. It lies close to the border with Morocco. The small town has about 1,200 inhabitants in 2011 and the population has risen only slightly in the last decade.

The town has the last beach before the border and the small community of Belyounech in the Moroccan region of Tanger-Tetouan-Al Hoceima. From this area the nearby mountain of Jebel Musa, which is known locally as the "Dead Woman" as the profile of the mountain is of a similar shape to a woman lying down, can be seen.

== History ==
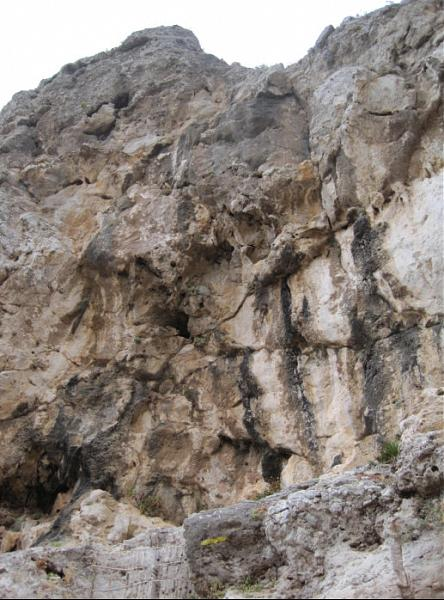
Access to the archaeological site of the cave of Benzú

It has rock shelters and caves which have evidence of occupation during the palaeolithic and neolithic periods. Researchers have found seven levels of human occupation dating back to 250,000 years ago. The evidence they have found has led them to think of the Straits of Gibraltar not as a barrier but a bridge to early humans. The different levels within the cave show the development of stone tools. The tools are made from flint, sandstone and radiolarite with scrapers used for working both wood and hide. Comparison of the technology used during the Pleistocene and Holocene periods by early humans shows that there was a very similar civilisation in caves excavated in Gibraltar, mainland Spain and around Tangier to caves around Benzú.

The population was given as 1,127 in 2000 and it has risen to 1,170 in 2010.

The N-354 and N-362 roads link Benzú to the city of Ceuta.

== Demographics ==
Historical populations
2000	2001	2002	2003	2004	2005	2006	2008	2009	2010	2012
1,127	1,187	1,187	1,123	1,077	1,085	1,055	1,134	1,125	1,170	1,326
