= Cabo Negro =

Beach resort in northern Morocco

Coordinates: 35°39′3″N 5°17′8″W

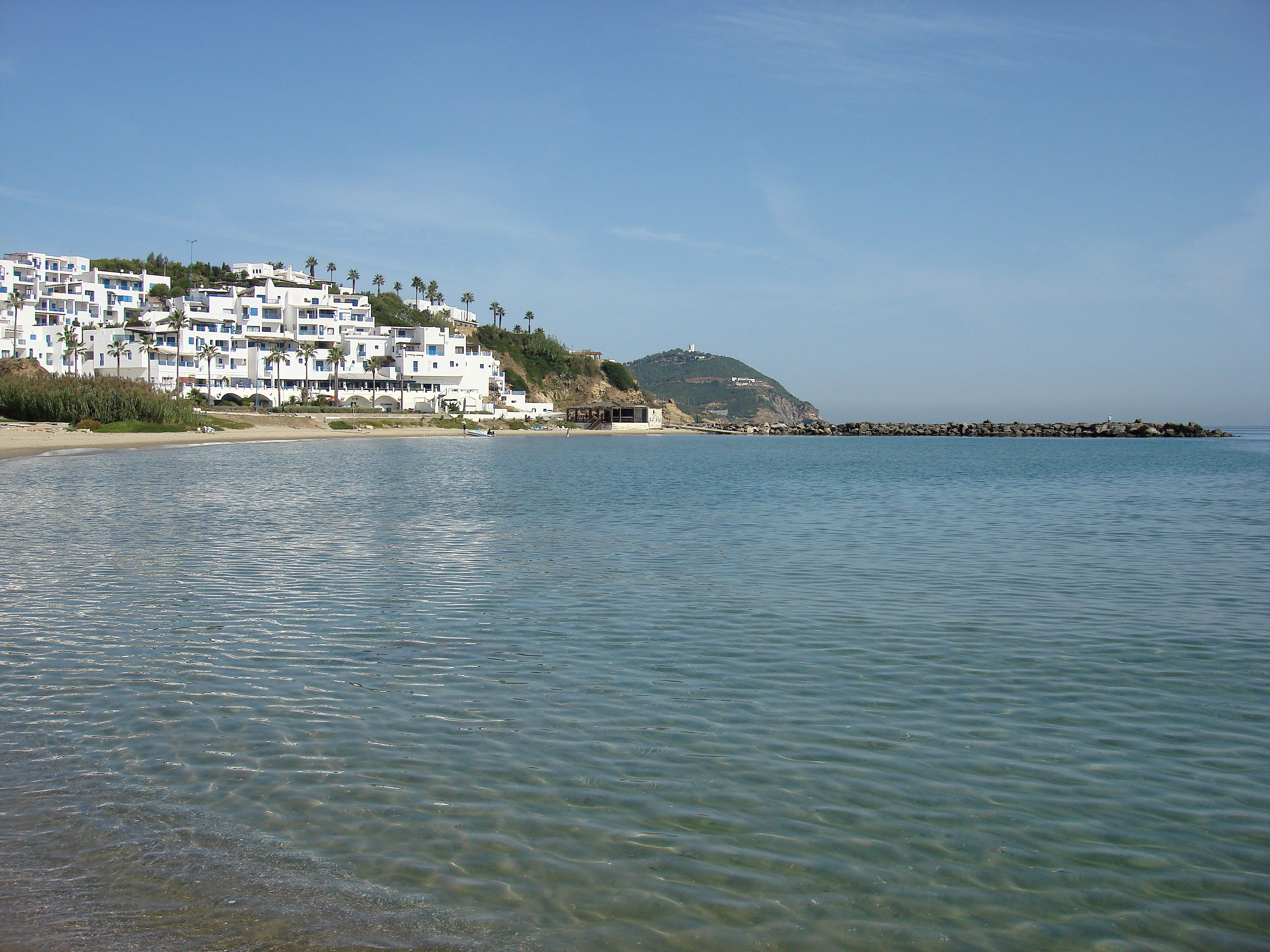
Cabo Negro beach, Tétouan, Morocco

Cabo Negro, also known as Golf Beach Cabo Negro or Cabo Negro Beach and Golf Resort, is a beach resort in northern Morocco, to the north of Tetouan, southeast of M'Diq, just north of Martil. The club originally had 9 holes, designed in 1978 by M. Cabell and B. Robinson, but has since been expanded into a full golf course. The resort of Cabo Negro is described by Baedeker as "the most modern and exclusive of the three towns [in the Tetouan area], with two large beaches of fine-grained sand. Along with restaurants, hotels and holiday houses, there are also nightclubs, tennis courts, horse-riding facilities and a 9-hole golf course."
