= Luis Ortiz Alfau =

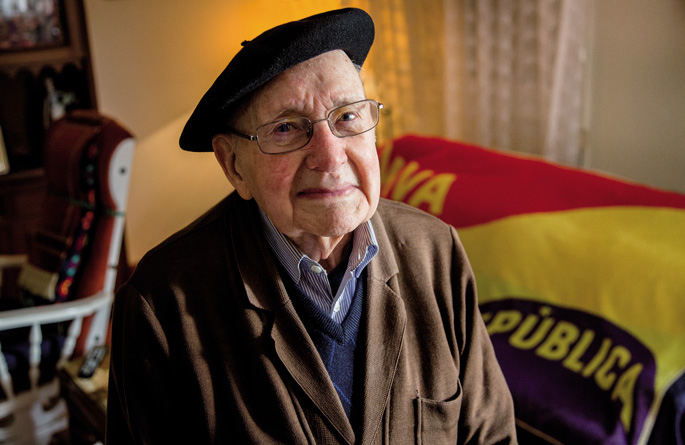
- Born: 13 October 1916
- Died: 8 March 2019 (aged 102)
- Occupation: Activist
- Military career
- Allegiance: Basque Army
- Battles / wars: Spanish Civil War

Luis Ortiz Alfau (1916–2019) was a Basque militiaman, also known as "gudaris", who defended the Second Republic during the Spanish Civil War (1936–1939). After the end of Francoism and what was later the boom of historical memory at the end of the 20th century, Luis participated in the recuperation of the memory of the Spanish Civil War.

== Participation in the Spanish Civil War ==
When the Spanish Civil War began, Luis enlisted in the leftist Republican Casero battalion, where he worked as a messenger and achieved the rank of lieutenant. In April 1937, during the bombing of Guernica, his battalion happened to be in the area and he collaborated in the aid efforts.

With the falling of Bilbao some months later in June 1937, he moved to Cantabria where he was injured by a bomb. He had to abandon the hospital because of the advances of the Francoist troops, and he got on board a boat to France. He would later return to Barcelona. After fighting again in the ranks of the Spanish Republican army, he was exiled in France at the end of the battle. It has been said that he didn't fire a single bullet throughout the war.

== Exile and postwar ==
Luis was one of the first Republican exiles to enter the Gurs concentration camp in the spring of 1939. This first group consisted of about 18,000 refugees, with the majority being Basques and members of the International Brigades. When WWII began, Luis decided to return to the Basque Country where he was born, but he was detained in Hendaia when crossing the border. He was then sent to various Francoist labor camps (Deusto and Miranda de Ebro) and to a battalion of enslaved workers in the Pyrenees mountains. Some years later, in 1943, he returned to Bilbao and was able to get work at the Uralita company, from where he retired in 1977.

== Historical memory and the 21st century ==
After the end of Francoism, Luis started to speak about his experiences during the war and the dictatorship. He won a case against the Basque government about compensation of victims of war who, like him, did not have documents that verified that they had been in the Francoist forced labor camps. He testified in various documentaries about the French Gurs internment camp, and he was one of the plaintiffs of a lawsuit in Argentina against the crimes of the Franco regime.
