= Allyene =

Coordinates: 35.7810°N 5.4011°W

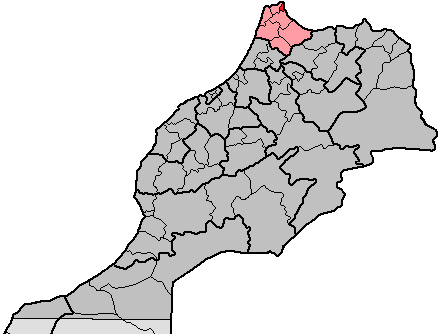

Allyene is a rural commune located in M'diq-Fnideq Prefecture, Morocco. The settlement has a population of 6126.
