= M'diq =

M'diq المضيق Rincón
- City
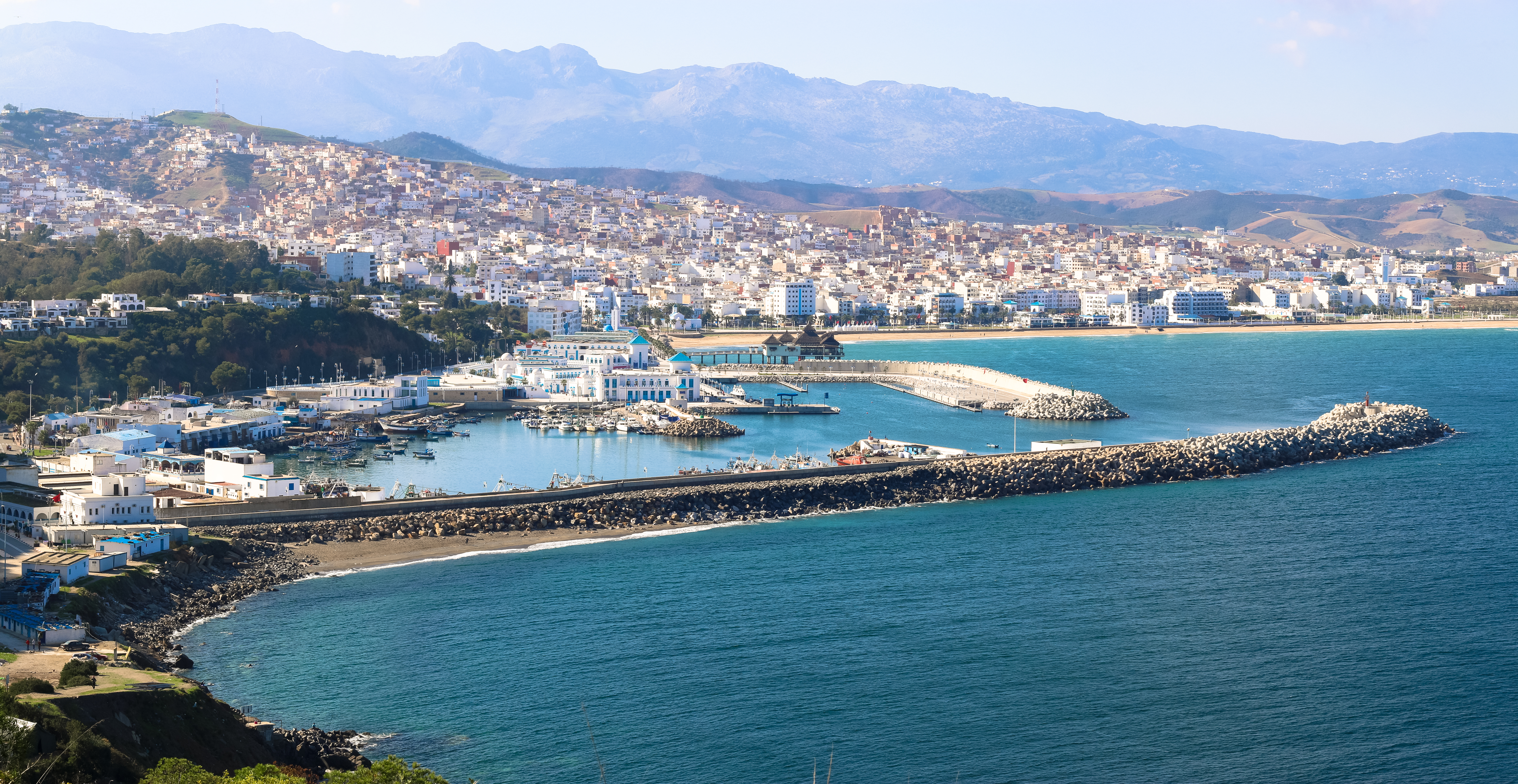
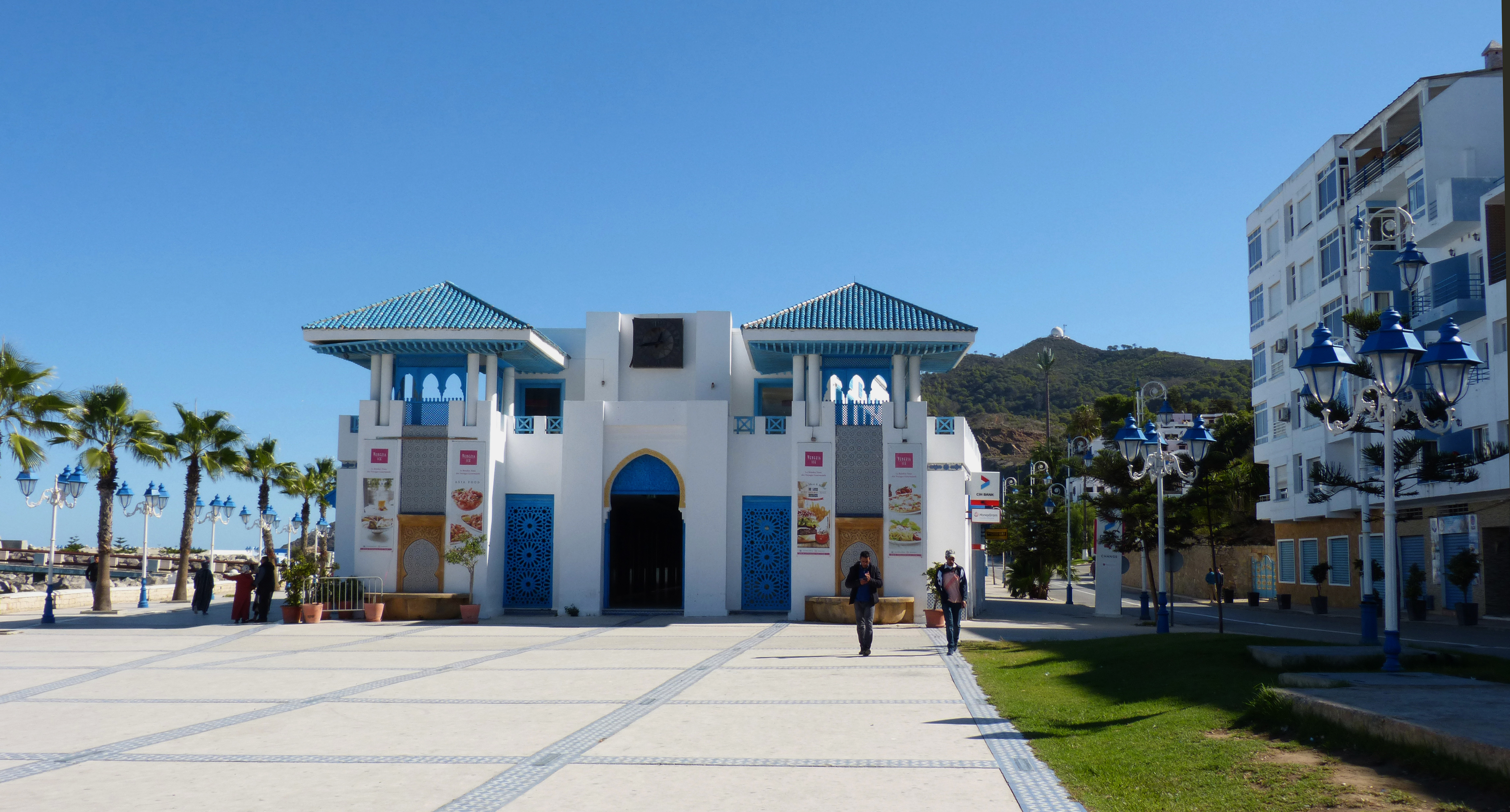
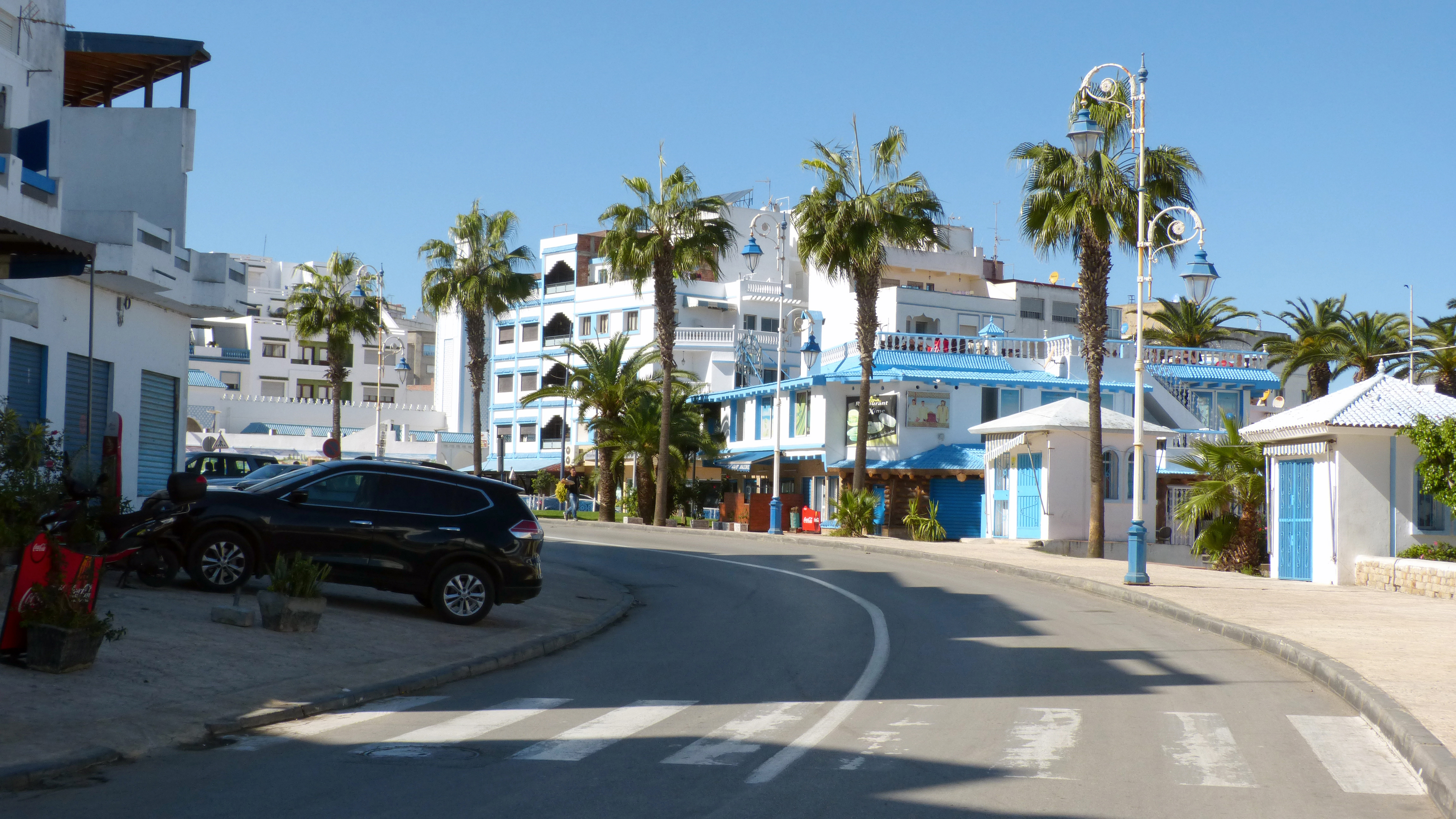
- Interactive map of M'diq
- Coordinates: 35°41′9″N 5°19′31″W
- Country: Morocco
- Region: Tanger-Tetouan-Al Hoceima
- Prefecture: M'diq-Fnideq

Population (2024)
  - Total: 67,599
- Time zone: UTC+0 (GMT)

M'Diq or Medieq (Arabic: المضيق, romanized: al-Maḍīq, lit. 'the Strait') is a Mediterranean town in northern Morocco located between Fnideq and Tétouan. The town is also known under the Spanish name Rincón. It borders Mellaliyine in the south and Allyene in the west. It is the seat of M'diq-Fnideq Prefecture.

M'diq covers an area of 480 hectares (1,200 acres), of which 153 hectares (380 acres) is urbanised. It recorded a population of 67,599 in the 2024 Moroccan census and hosts more than 100,000 tourists each year.

SNIM (M'Diq's Sailing Week/Semaine nautique internationale de M'Diq) is one of the most important tourist attractions. It is organised once a year by the M'Diq Royal Yachting Club and sponsored by several commercial firms. It is also significant to all the surrounding socio-cultural activities.

== Harbour ==
The town's harbour is split into two parts: one for tourism and the other for fishing. Both have been expanded recently in order to improve tourist offerings and to increase the harbour's capacity. M'Diq is a popular weekend destination for residents of nearby Ceuta. Boats up to 50 metres long with a depth of nearly five metres can be moored.
