= Jebel Musa (Morocco) =

Mountain in Morocco

- Jbel Musa, Djebel Musa
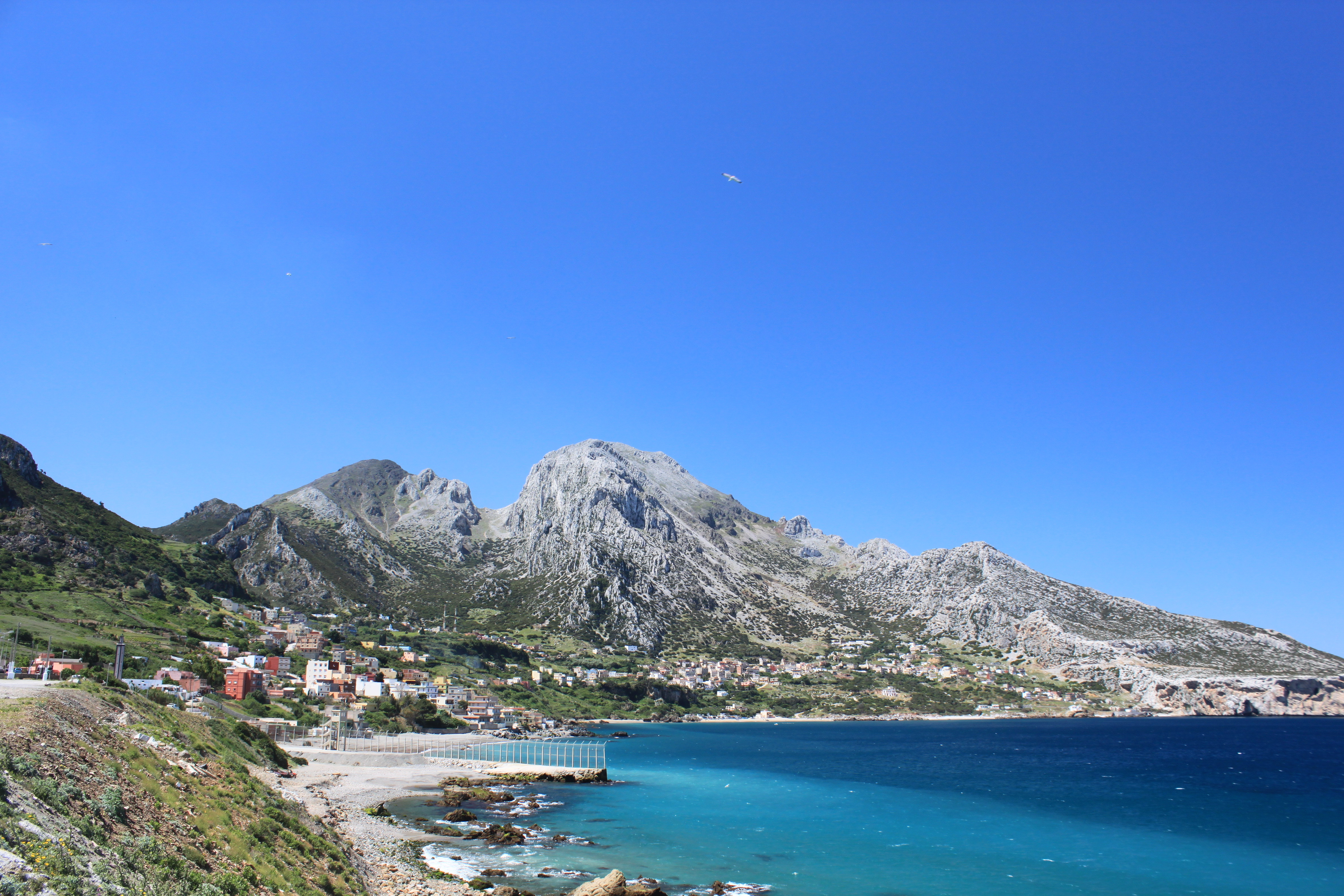
- View of Jebel Musa from Benzú, in the Spanish enclave of Ceuta.

Highest point
- Elevation: 842 m (2,762 ft)
- Listing: List of mountain ranges in the world named The Sleeping Lady
- Coordinates: 35°54′N 05°25′W

Geography
- Location: Morocco
- Parent range: Rif Mountains

Climbing
- First ascent: Unknown

Ramsar Wetland
- Official name: Littoral de Jbel Moussa
- Designated: 16 April 2019
- Reference no.: 2381

Jebel Musa (Arabic: جبل موسى, Jabal Mūsā; Berber languages: Adrar n Musa; meaning "Mount Moses") is a mountain in the northernmost part of Morocco, near of the Strait of Gibraltar. Jebel Musa is part of the Rif mountain chain, and is along with nearby Monte Hacho one of the two mountains considered as candidates to be the southern Pillar of Hercules, Mons Abila (Mount Abila or Abyla).

== History ==
Jebel Musa, named, according to the 14th-century Berber Muslim geographer Ibn Battuta, in honour of Musa ibn Nusayr, to whom the conqueror of Andalusia Tariq ibn Ziyad owed fealty, was known to the ancient Greeks and Phoenicians as Mount Abyla and to the Romans as Columna. Together with the Rock of Gibraltar to the north, it is generally identified as one of the Pillars of Hercules. (This title is also claimed for Monte Hacho in the Spanish exclave of Ceuta, to the east of Jebel Musa.)

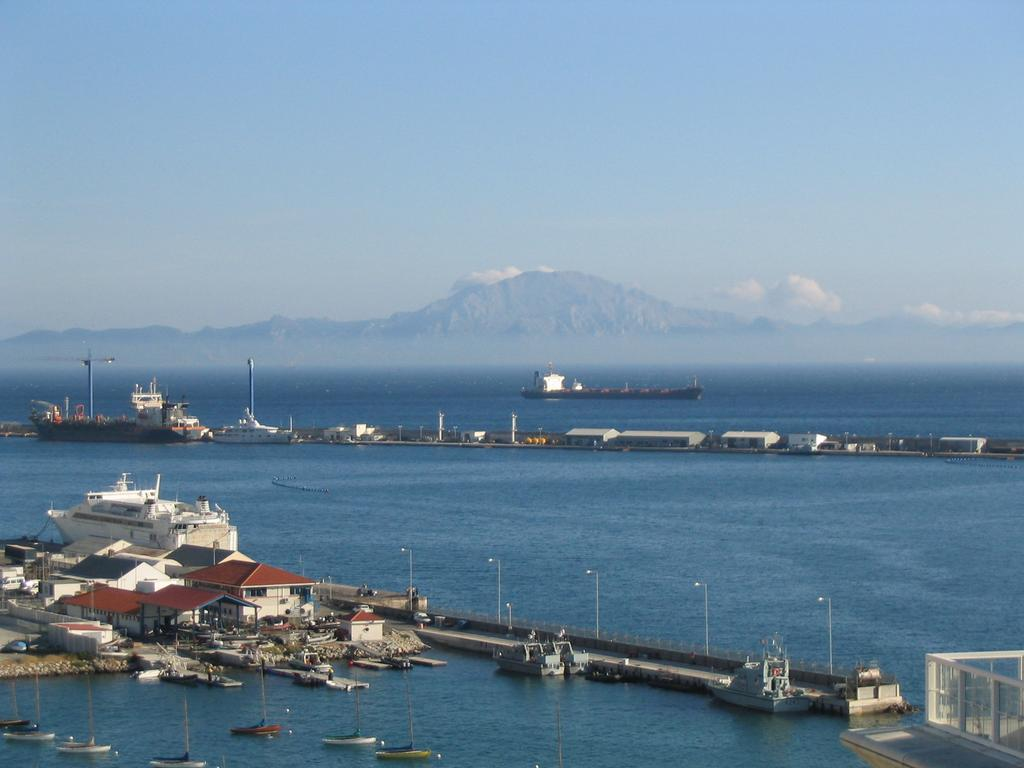
View of Jebel Musa as seen from Gibraltar

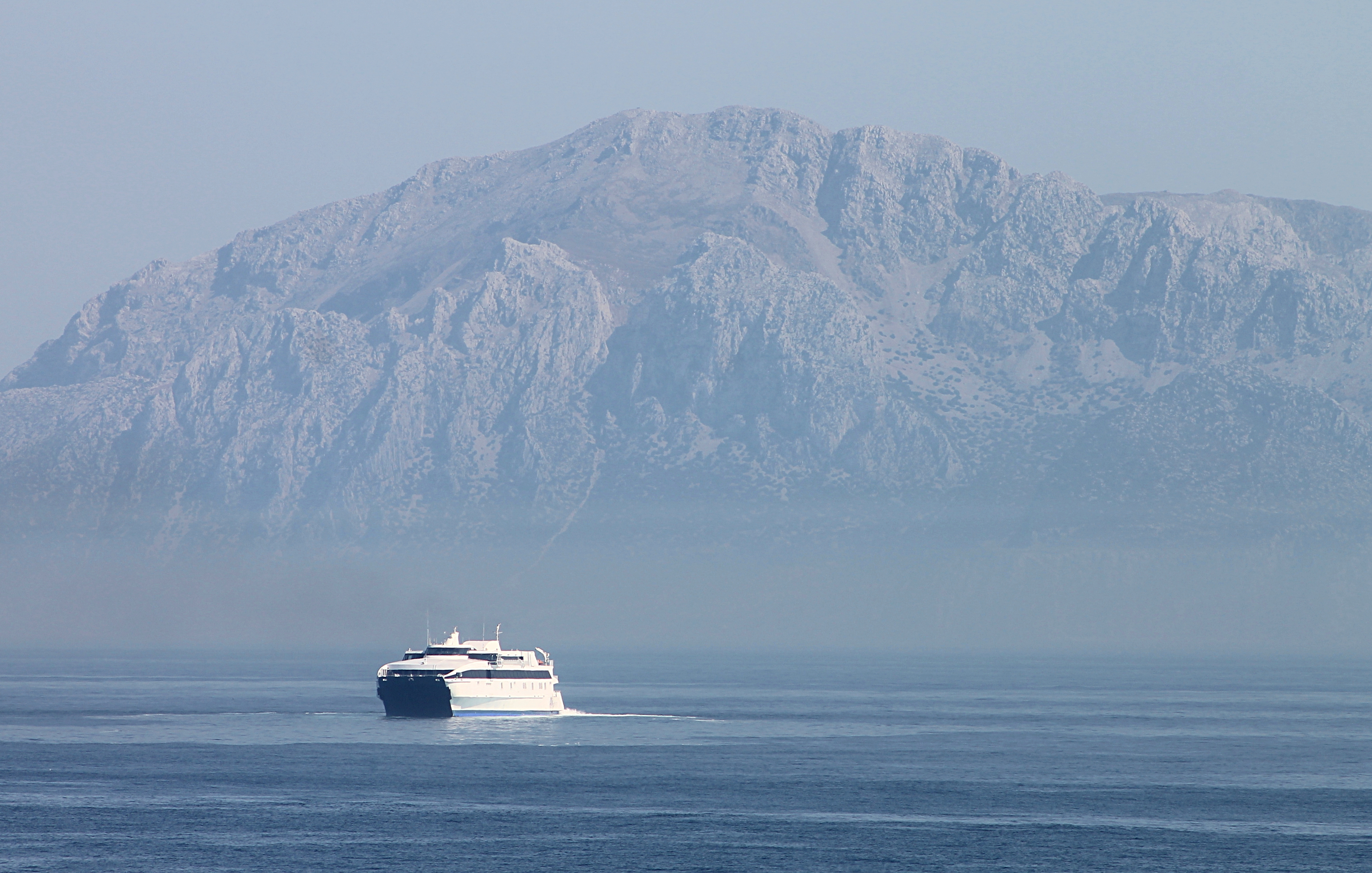
Jebel Musa, viewed in telephoto lens from the shore of Cadiz Province, Spain

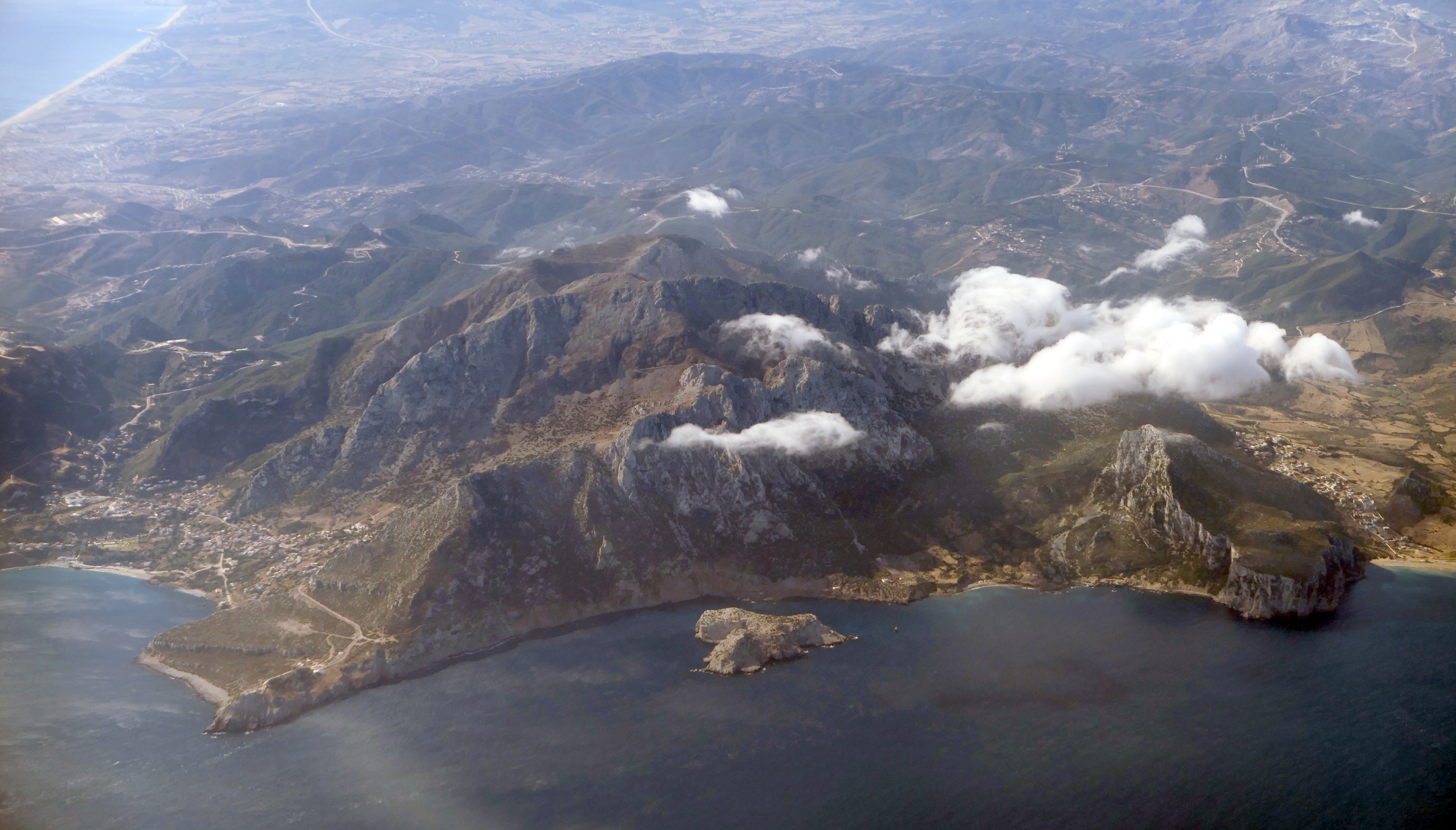
An aerial view of the mountain

The name "pillars of Hercules" derives from one of the twelve labours assigned by the Greek hero Heracles. Perseus had defeated the Titan Atlas by showing him the head of the Gorgon. Atlas was petrified; his hair became a forest and his shoulders became cliffs. Heracles was then directed to get the Cattle of Geryon and deliver them to Eurystheus. Heracles' way was blocked by the mountain that Perseus had created; to clear a way, he used his mace to split the mountain in half, one part becoming the Rock of Gibraltar and the other becoming a mountain in Morocco. According to the myth, this split in the mountain created a sea link between the Atlantic and the Mediterranean Sea. This link was the Strait of Gibraltar.

== Geography ==
Jebel Musa is 842 metres (2,762 ft) high. To the north, across the Strait of Gibraltar, lie Spain and the British Overseas Territory of Gibraltar. To the east is Ceuta, a Spanish exclave, and to the west and south is Morocco. By road, the mountain is about 22 kilometres (14 mi) west of Ceuta and about 72 kilometres (45 mi) east of Tangier.

Jebel Musa is opposite the Rock of Gibraltar at the entrance to the Mediterranean Sea from the Atlantic Ocean. It is an important landmark in the region of Tanger-Tetouan-Al Hoceima on the north coast of Morocco. The coastlines around the mountain show evidence of having had varying sea levels through the ages. These highstands are at 120–130 metres; 80 to 90 metres; 40 to 60 metres and from 0 to 25 metres above the present sea level.

In Ceuta, around the town of Benzú, the mountain is known as The Dead Woman (Spanish: la Mujer Muerta), because from that direction it resembles a woman on her back.

== Ecology ==
The mountain is a site for birdwatching. Migratory birds use the updraughts and thermals from Jebel Musa to gain height before attempting to cross the Strait of Gibraltar. The Strait of Gibraltar is "one of the world's most prominent" migration bottlenecks and raptor watching is popular in the fall, though the best observation points may be north of the Strait. The site has been designated an Important Bird Area (IBA) by BirdLife International because it supports significant populations of migrating soaring birds, especially raptors, cranes and storks, as well as passerines and waders. The shoreline at the foot of the mountain has been designated as a protected Ramsar site since 2019.

The area around the mountain has over 200 caves that attract visiting cavers. The area around the mountain is mainly forest and is identified in the Plan for Protected Areas in Morocco as a Site of Biological and Ecological Interest (SIBE).
