= Fnideq =

Fnideq الفنيدق ⵍⴼⵏⵉⴷⵇ Castillejos
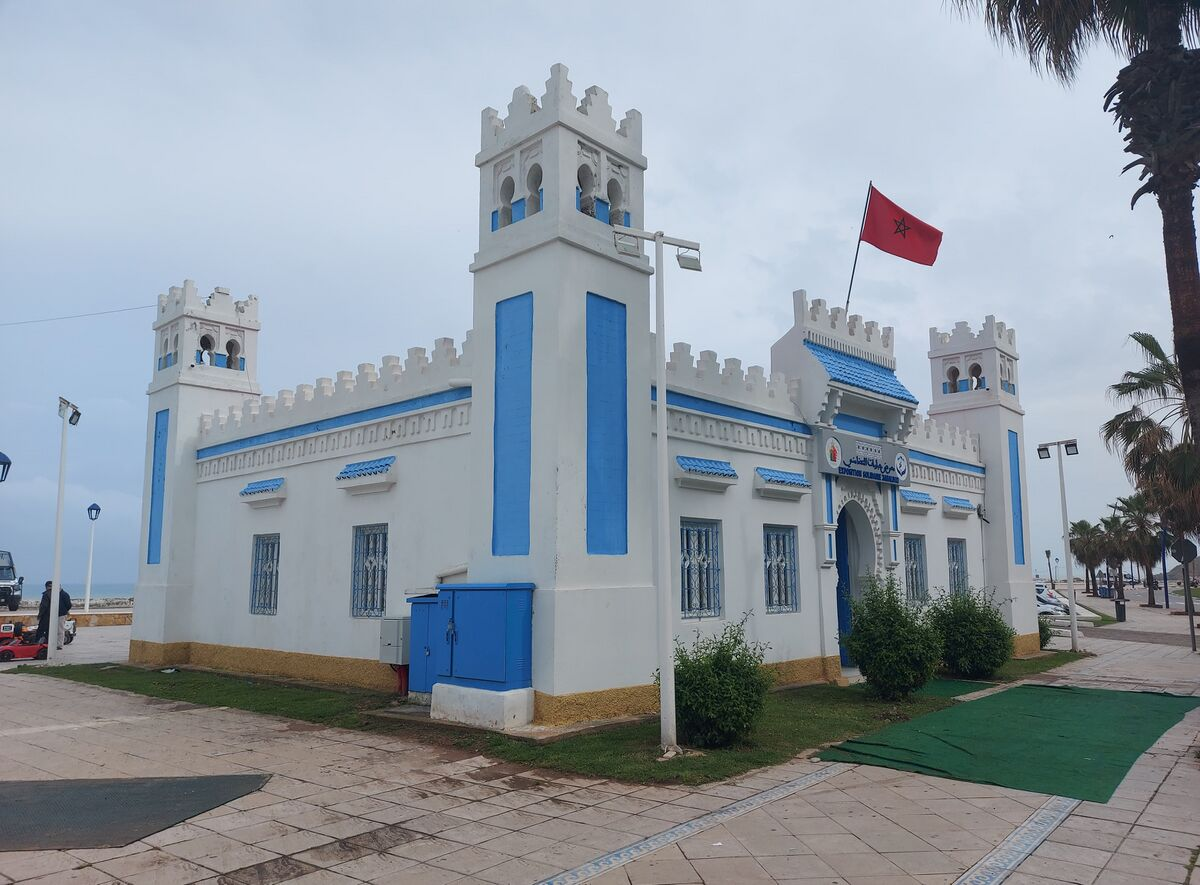
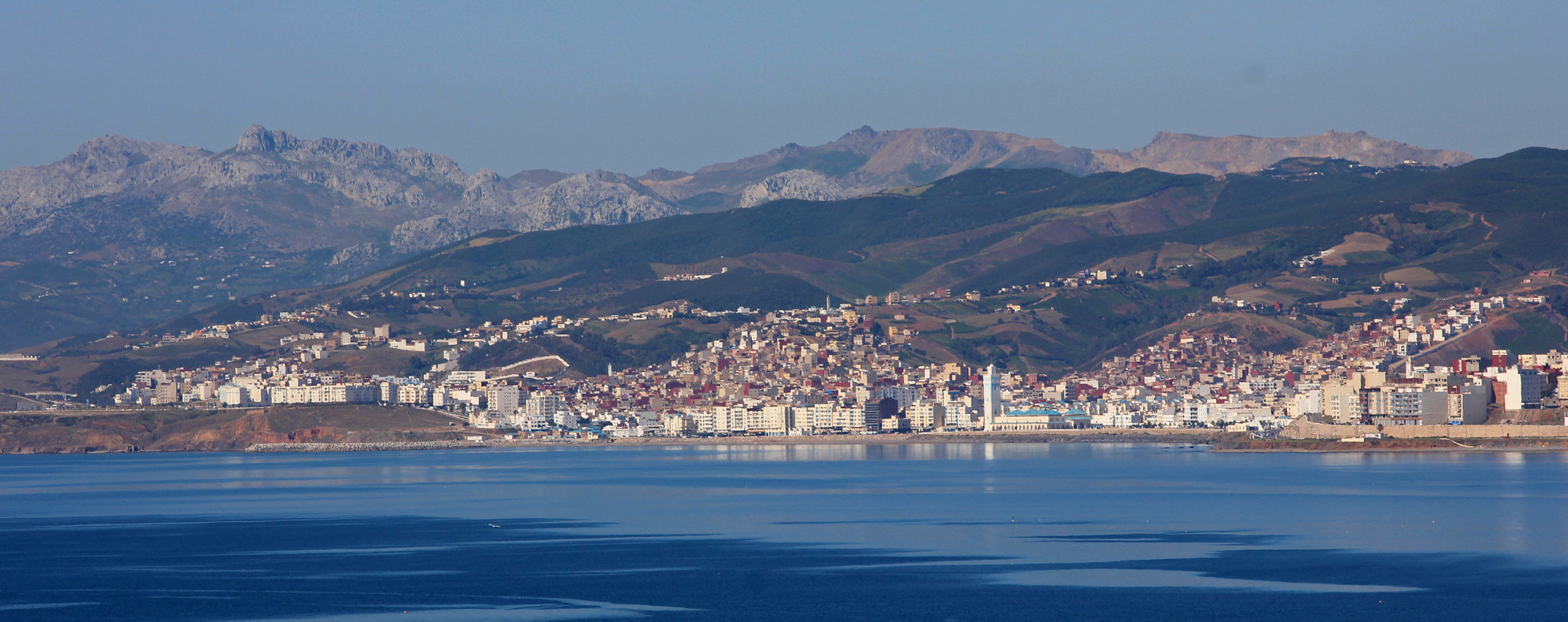
- Interactive map of Fnideq
- Coordinates: 35°50′33″N 5°21′33″W
- Country: Morocco
- Region: Tanger-Tetouan-Al Hoceima
- Prefecture: M'diq-Fnideq

Population (September 2014)
  - Total: 77,436
- Time zone: UTC+0 (GMT)

Fnideq (Arabic: الفنيدق) is a town in northern Morocco, on the Mediterranean coast of M'diq-Fnideq Prefecture, 31 kilometres (19 mi) north of the city of Tétouan. The town is also known under the Spanish name Castillejos.

It is the closest Moroccan urban commune to the Spanish exclave of Ceuta, although the rural commune of Belyounech is closer.

During the Hispano-Moroccan War of 1859, it was the location of the decisive Battle of Castillejos.

== Notable people ==
- Hamza El Moussaoui, international footballer
- Amin Erbati, former international footballer
- Abd al-Salam ibn Mashish, Sufi saint
