= Rabat Ring Road =

Road in Morocco

Rabat Bypass motorway
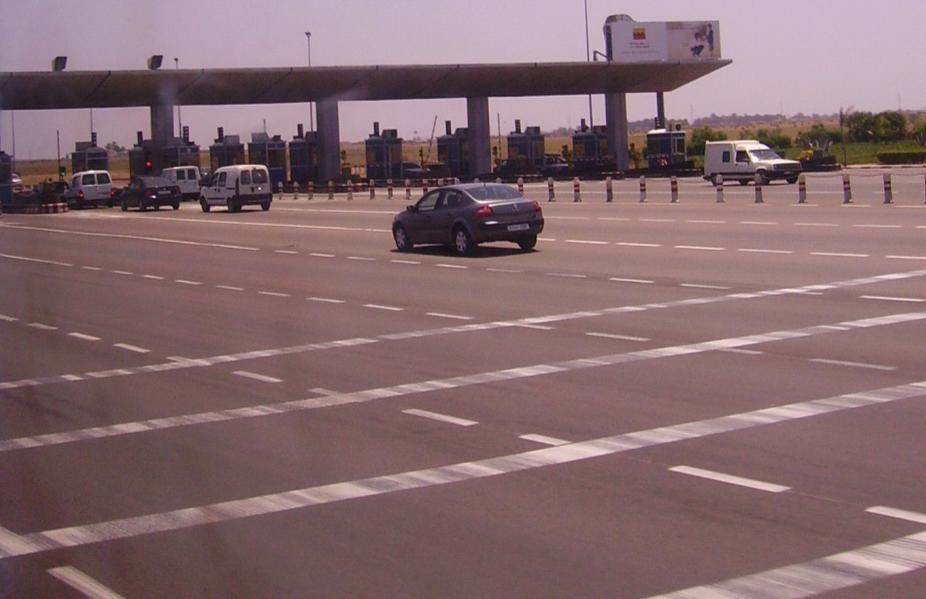

Route information
- Length: 41.7 km (25.9 mi)
- Existed: 2016–present
- History: Construction started in 2011, opening since 2016

Major junctions
- North end: Rabat North
- local roads: Technopolis, Salé, Rabat, Tamesna
- South end: Rabat-Casablanca expressway A1

Location
- Country: Morocco

Highway system
- Transport in Morocco

The Rabat Ring Road or Rabat Bypass is a Moroccan expressway around the capital Rabat. Like all ring roads, it was built to allow drivers to have an alternate route around the city to other destinations without having to drive into the city and increase traffic.

== Background ==
The road is constructed to relieve the city of Rabat and Salé from passing-through traffic. Like all Moroccan expressways the road is being constructed by the ADM or in full the Société Nationale des Autoroutes du Maroc. This new by-pass will shorten traveling times for ongoing traffic between Casablanca and the North and it will also decrease the number of accidents as the Moroccan expressways have better safety records than local and national roads.

== The route ==
The new ring road will connect to the existing motorway from Casablanca in the South and finally connect to the existing A5 and A2 towards the North and North-East of the country.

=== Characteristics ===
The total length of the ring road will be 41,1 km: 36 km main-route and 5,1 km upgrade of existing roads. There will be 5 interchanges with other roads - one of them the junction with the A1 expressway from Casablanca.

There will be one 'service area' with petrol-station, restaurant and a place for praying at KP26 (KP=kilometre numbering, so at 26 km from the start point). Other nearby service-points are at KP 27 of the Casablanca-Rabat expressway and at KP28 of Rabat-Kenitra expressway.

Three bridges are being built over the Bou Regreg, Yoem and Akkrach rivers or streams. Apart from that a total of 38 structures are projected: 14 overpasses, 16 underpasses, 5 road-tunnels (5×5 metre) and two pedestrian crossings.

There will be one single toll-barrier. Some 15 million cubic metres (m^{3}) of earth will be moved during the construction: 7 million m^{3} cuttings and 8 million m^{3} embankments.

== Costs ==
The projected costs for this bypass 2762 million dirhams without tax, averaging at 66,4 MDH/km.

Construction began in 2011 and the motorway has been open since 2016.

== See also ==
- Mohammed VI Bridge
