= Autoroutes of Morocco =

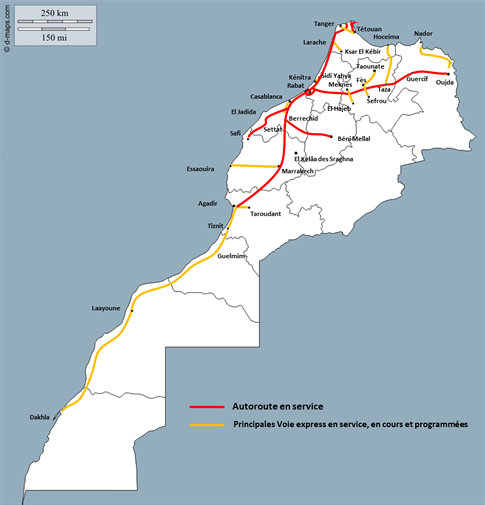
Map of Moroccan highways and expressways

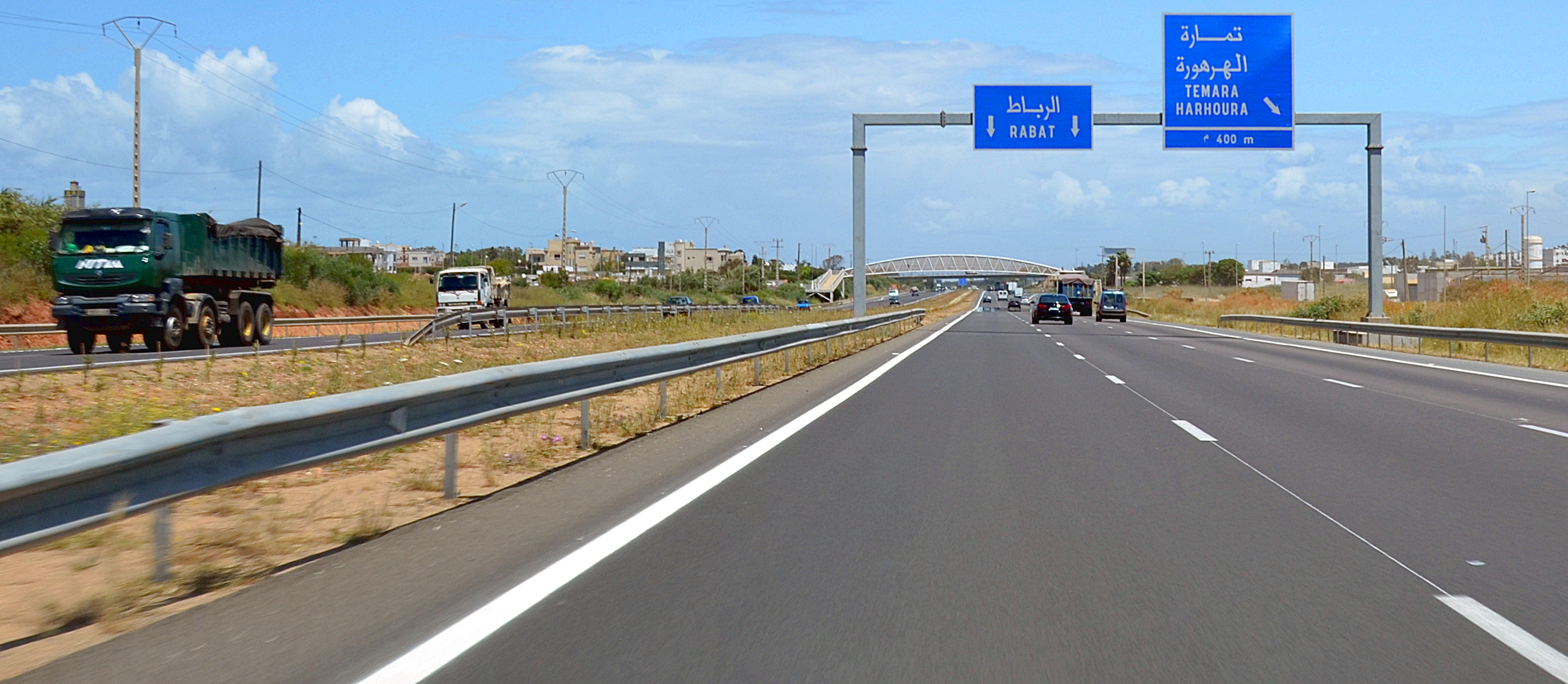
Casablanca-Rabat expressway (A1) going northbound near Temara

Morocco's network of motorways is administered by the state-owned company Autoroutes du Maroc (ADM). It runs the network on a pay-per-use basis, with toll stations placed along its length. The general speed limit is 120 km/h.

== History ==
The first expressway in the country was the A1 Casablanca-Rabat. Construction of the first section started in 1975. Completion of this road between the economic and the administrative capitals took 13 years. Originally, use of the road was free of charge. The toll-road system was introduced as one measure to prevent lengthy construction times, as happened with this first road. Finding investors for new roads would be easier if these roads generated their own revenue to repay investors.

== Realized ==
In 2006, it was announced that ADM would be investing 6.18 billion dirhams ($859 million) to develop its highway network in 2007. These investment packages were part of the objective that aimed to complete 1,500 km by 2012.

As of August 2016, ADM managed 1808 km of Morocco's toll roads. As of November 2016 the total length of Morocco's motorways is 1,808 kilometres (paid) and 1,093 kilometres (free) expressways.

== Planned ==
The Kingdom of Morocco is planning investments of around €23 billion in road construction until 2035. The Moroccan government has announced that more than 5,500 kilometres of new highways and expressways are to be constructed, this will be an investment totalling €8.8 billion. This includes 700 km of 3x2 roads that will be constructed.

Also 45,000 km of new rural roads will be created in rural areas and the modernization of 7,000 km of rural roads. It is part of new plan of the Moroccan Ministry of Transport, which will invest 660 billion dirhams in the transport and logistics sector.

Ahead of the 2030 FIFA World Cup, Morocco is taking on a €650 million loan from the African Development Bank to improve the infrastructure of the country to develop air, road and rail connections throughout the country. As of spring 2025, there are 2,177 km of roads in the country. And of the new projects to be built in time for the World Cup, the government unveiled a plan to invest MAD 12.5 billion ($1.25 billion) into its roads infrastructure, a development that already invests MAD 3 billion ($300 million) annually to maintain the roads.

== List of motorways ==
Principal motorways
| Ref | From | To | Via | Length | Notes |
|---|---|---|---|---|---|
| A1 | Rabat | Safi | Mohammedia, Casablanca, El Jadida | 313 km | |
| A2 | Rabat | Oujda | Khemisset, Meknes, Fes, Taza, Guercif, Taourirt | 494 km | |
| A3 | Casablanca | Agadir | Berrechid, Settat, Ben Guerir, Marrakesh, Imintanoute | 429 km | |
| A31 | Tit Mellil | Berrechid | Mediouna, Deroua, A4/A3 Interchange | 31 km | |
| A4 | Berrechid | Beni Mellal | Khouribga | 174 km | |
| A5 | Port Tanger Med | Rabat | Kenitra, Salé | 308 km | |
| A7 | Fnideq | Tétouan | M'diq, Marina Smir | 28 km | |
| A? | Guercif | Nador | | | Under construction as of late 2025 |
| A? | Rabat | Casablanca | | | A second motorway under construction between Rabat and Casablanca to alleviate traffic and pressure |

Bypasses
| Ref | Name | Length | Notes |
|---|---|---|---|
| A101 | Ain Harrouda Bypass | 24 km | |
| A102 | Azbane Bypass | 1.5 km | |
| A103 | El Jadida Bypass | 5.5 km | |
| A201 | Fes Bypass | 11 km | |
| A301 | Marrakech Palmeraie Bypass | 13.5 km | |
| A501 | Tangier West Bypass | 1.5 km | |

=== Under construction ===
Motorways under construction
| Ref | From | To | Via | Length | Notes |
|---|---|---|---|---|---|
| | Guercif | Nador | | | |
| | Rabat | Casablanca | | | |

The construction history of these expressways by segment is as follows:

Moroccan Expressways
| from | | to | length in km | construction period | avg costs MDH/km | notes |
|---|---|---|---|---|---|---|
| Casablanca | | Rabat | 62 | forming the A3 motorway | | |
| using: | Casablanca | Oued Cherrat | 33,5 | 1975–1978 | | |
| and: | Oued Cherrat | Rabat | 25.5 | 1983–1987 | | |
| Rabat | | Larache | 150 | | 13 | |
| using: | Rabat | Kénitra | 40 | 1993–1995 | | |
| and: | Kénitra | Larache | 110 | 1993–1996 | | |
| Larache | | Sidi El yamani | 28 | 1996–1999 | | |
| Sidi El yamani | | Asilah | 15 | 2000–2002 | | |
| Asilah | | Tanger | 30 | 2002–2005 | | |
| | together forming the A1 Rabat-Tangier expressway | | | | | |
| Rabat | | Fès | 167 | | 14.4 | |
| using | Rabat | Khemiset | 66 | 1996–1999 | | |
| and | Fes | Khemiset | 116 | 1995–1998 | | |
| Casablanca | | Settat | 57 | 1998–2001 | 17.5 | |
| Casablanca bypass | | | 27 | 2000–2004 | 25 | built in two phases |
| Casablanca | | Safi | 255.5 | | | |
| using | Casablanca | Had Soualem | 16 | 2001–2004 | 18 | |
| and | Had Soualem | Tnine Chtouka | 35 | 2002–2005 | 20 | |
| and | Tnine Chtouka | El Jadida | 28 | 2004–2006 | 26 | |
| and | El Jadida | Safi | 143 | 2012–2016 | 30 | |
| Settat | | Marrakesh | 162 | 2004–2007 | | |
| Tanger-Med connector | | | 54 | 2004–2008 | 73 | |
| Tétouan | | Fnideq | 28 | 2004–2008 | 36 | last 11 km opened 21-07-08 |

== Road safety ==
In 2007 762 crashes with casualties were reported, a 5% increase on 2006. The crash-rate per 100 million traveled kilometers dropped by 20% from 30.2 to 24.1 between these years, but the total number as well as rate of deaths didn't go down.

A breakdown of these figures:

Moroccan Expressways Safety
| Type crash | 2006 | 2007 | % change | notes |
|---|---|---|---|---|
| serious crashes | 726 | 762 | +5% | is crash with serious inj. or deaths |
| rate per 100 mln km. | 30,2 | 24.1 | -20% | |
| fatal crashes | 74 | 86 | +16% | is crash with at least one death |
| rate per 100 mln km. | 3,1 | 2,7 | -12% | |
| serious injuries | 480 | 535 | +11% | |
| is per 100 mln km. | 20,0 | 16,9 | -15% | |
| deaths | 90 | 127 | +41% | |
| is per 100 mln km. | 3,7 | 4,0 | +7% | |

=== Increasing road-safety ===
Increasing safety is an important goal for the ADM: the new autoroutes are designed to improve safety and the ADM also believes that extending the express-way network will increase overall safety as the through-going (and often high-speed) traffic is moved away from the Route Nationals, that run through the cities and villages along the way. Expressways also use non-level crossings and because there is no oncoming traffic overtaking cars is safer than on normal roads. The ADM also publishes traffic violence figures to increase the attention of the public in road-safety.

In the first quarter of 2011 the number of crashes on expressways with injuries fell 21% compared to the same period in 2010

== See also ==
- List of toll roads
- Société Nationale des Autoroutes du Maroc
