= National Route 2 (Morocco) =

Road in Morocco

National Route 2

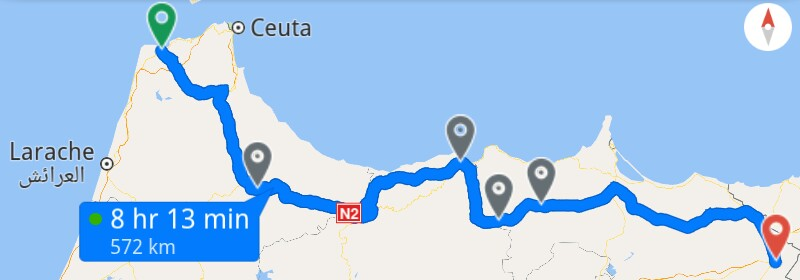

Major junctions
- West end: Tangier
- East end: Oujda

Location
- Country: Morocco

Highway system
- Transport in Morocco

The N2 road is a national road (Route Nationale) in Morocco which connects Tangier in the northwest of the country with Oujda in the Northeast.

The major N routes are toll-free roads. The roads can run through cities along the way, unlike the toll-roads with A-numbers - the Moroccan Expressways - that are built around towns.

The road is one of the main East-West route in the North of the country and roughly follows the Mediterranean coastline some 20 – 40 km inland straight through the Rif Mountains.

== The route ==
From the start in Tangier the road goes Southeast to Tetouan, the uses the N13 south to Derdara. The N2 continues in Eastern direction to Bab Taza, Cheratat and Ketama. From here the road points North-East to Al Hoceima. From this major coastal town the road runs some 30 km South before continuing her Eastern direction to Setouane, and sideroad N15 to Nador, Further East the route goes further inland via Berkane and terminates in Oujda.

The N2 has many side-roads to coastal or inland cities in the North of Morocco

== Alternatives ==
Further south the N6 runs mainly parallel with this N2 but connects Rabat, via Fez and Meknes with Oujda. The existing A2 from Rabat to Fez is extended all the way to Oujda. When completed this Fes-Oujda expressway will be the main East-West route in the North and take over the function of the N6. The N2 will continue to be the main route from Tangier to many cities along the coast.
