= Instituto Español Lope de Vega =

Spanish international school in Nador, Morocco

Location
- Nador; Morocco

Information
- School type: International School
- Established: 1914; 111 years ago

Instituto Español Lope de Vega is a Spanish international school in Nador, Morocco. Operated by the Spanish Ministry of Education, it serves infant education through bachillerato (senior high school/sixth form college).

The Grupo Escolar Lope de Vega was established in 1914, and established a girls' school division in 1917.
