= Khadab =

Village in Morocco

Coordinates: 35.3542°N 3.0228°W

Khadab is a small village close to the town of Nador in Morocco.

== Gallery ==
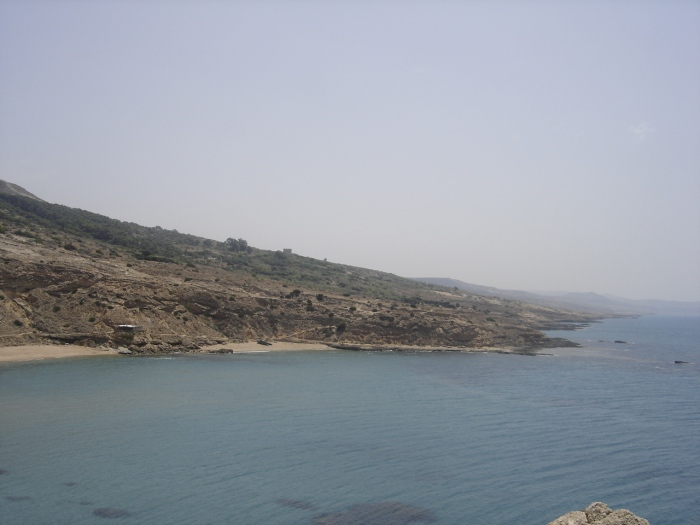

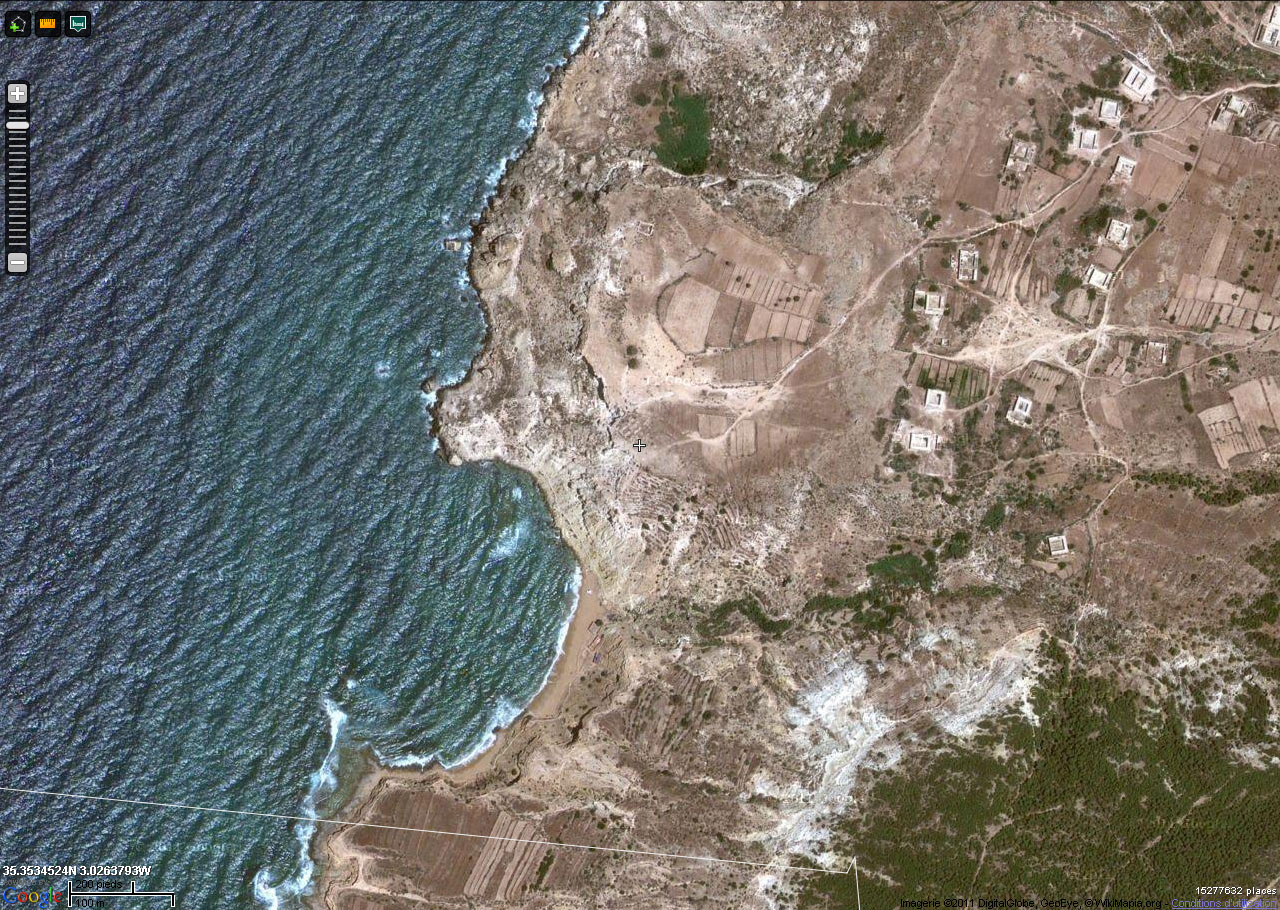

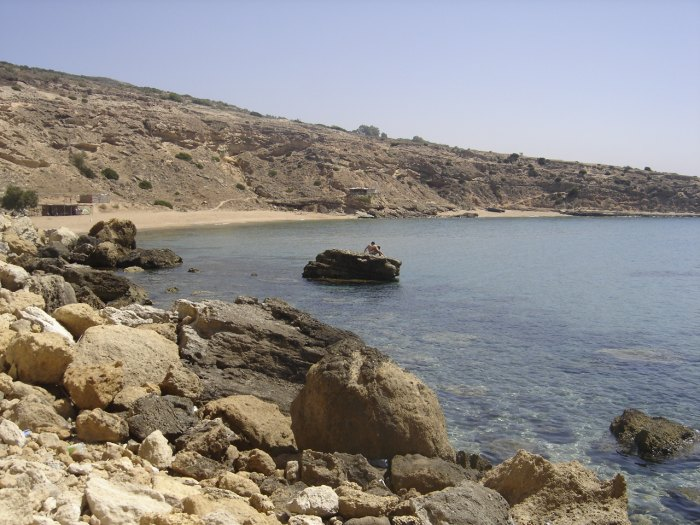

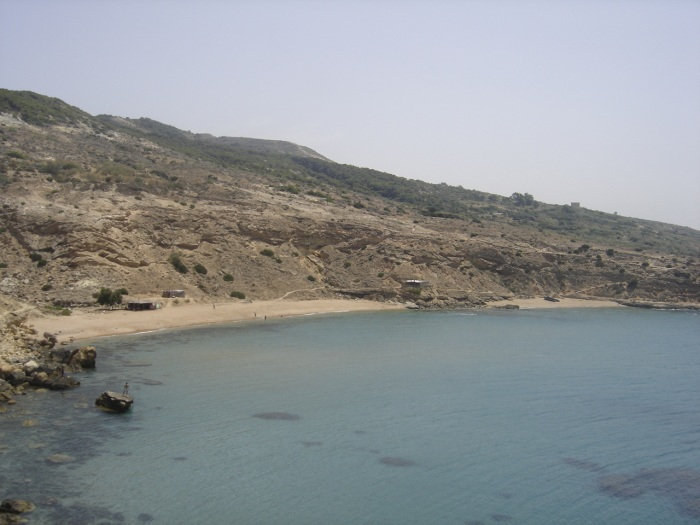
