= Fez–Oujda expressway =

Road in Morocco

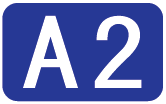
A2 motorway
- A2 motorway extension

Route information
- Length: 306 km (190 mi)
- Existed: 2007–present
- History: Scheduled completed and officially opened 25 July 2011

Major junctions
- West end: Fez
- A2
- East end: Oujda

Location
- Country: Morocco

Highway system
- Transport in Morocco

Fez–Oujda expressway is not an expressway where it is free but a paying 'Motorway' linking Morocco-Algeria with Oujda-Rabat-Casablanca and Southern Morocco and came into operation on 25 July 2011. The road is designated as A2 and is an extension to the Rabat–Fez expressway but in Morocco they tend to use the descriptive name with the city-names at start and finish.

The motorway is an extension on the existing Rabat–Meknes–Fez expressway which is designated as A2 or Rabat–Fez expressway. Work started in 2007 and originally planned opening was for 2011.

== Finance ==
The projected costs for the construction were projected at 9.125 million MDH, excluding costs for buying or acquiring land. but the final costs came to 10.800 MDH, which comes to 33,44 MDH per kilometer road

The ADM signed an agreement with the Hassan II Fund for Economic and Social Development for a financial injection of the ADM of 2000 MDH in 2005 and invited external investors for participation.

The main investors are: (all in million MDH, unless other stated)

- BID – Islamic Bank for Development – 1080
- FADES – Arab Fund for social and economic development – 1800
- FKDEA – Kuwait Fund for Arab and Economic Development – 900
- a fund related to the OPEC – 225
- FEMIP – European Fund Euro-Medit. Inv&Partnersh. – € 180 M
- FAD – Fonds d'Abou Dhabi – 225

== Sections ==
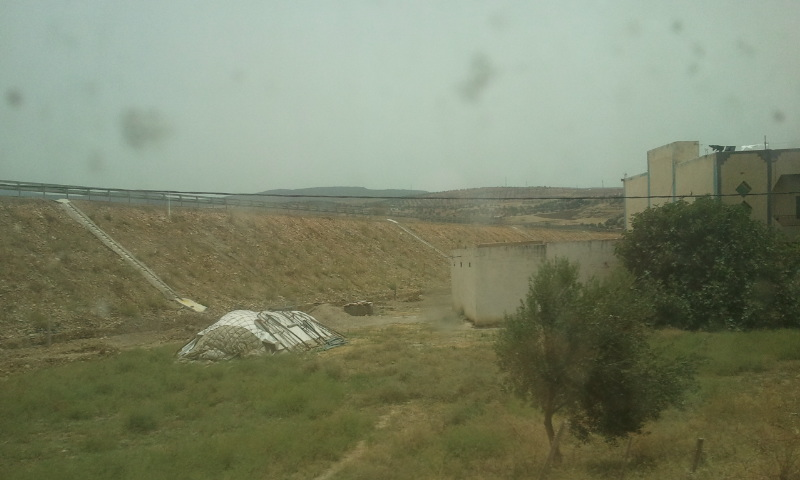
Nearly completed road through the Rif mountains on 12 July 2011 section between Taourirt and Fez

The construction is divided into ten sections:

- 1 : Fez – PK 43,9 (43,9 km)
- 2 : PK 43,9 – Béni Bouzert (28,1 km)
- 3 : Béni Bouzert – Oued Amlil (20 km)
- 4 : Oued Amlil – PK 110 (18 km)
- 5 : PK 110 – Taza (17 km)
- 6 : Taza – Guercif (67 km)
- 7 : Guercif - Taourirt (34 km)
- 8 : Taourirt – Laayoun (53 km)
- 9 : Laayoun – PK 316 (35 km)
- 10 : PK 316 – Oujda (12 km).

Several national and international constructors work on one or more sections of the road. Most international contractors have worked/are working for ADM on other projects such as the Casablanca–Agadir expressway

== Network ==
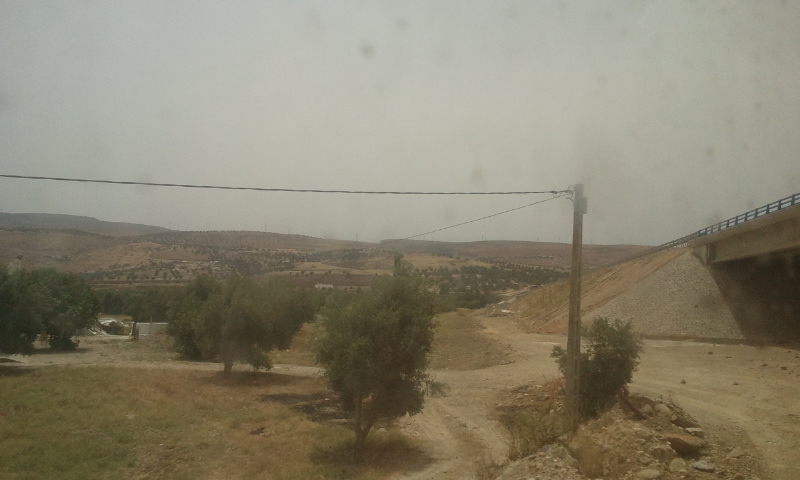
A viaduct for the road between Taourirt and Fez taken one week before opening of the road

This stretch is an important part of the Moroccan East-West corridor and will also be a part of the so-called l’Autoroute Maghrébine which will run from Nouakchott (capital of Mauritania) all the way to Tobruk in Libya.

The road will improve the access to and from many cities along the Mediterranean coast. Another project improving transport in the North is the new railroad to the port of Nador and Spanish enclave Melilla
