= Rabat–Tangier expressway =

Expressway in Morocco

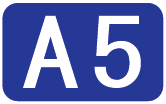
A5 motorway

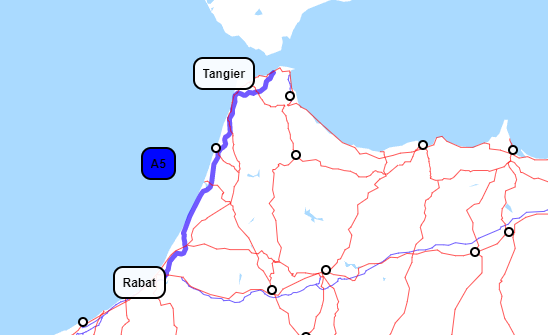

Route information
- Length: 308 km (191 mi)
- Existed: 1995–present
- History: Completed in 2005

Major junctions
- North end: Tanger Med
- A2, A1, N2
- South end: Rabat

Location
- Country: Morocco
- Major cities: Rabat, Salé, Kenitra, Larache, Tangier

Highway system
- Transport in Morocco

The Rabat–Tangier-Med motorway is a motorway in Morocco. It begins in Morocco's capital of Rabat, and connects to the northern port of Tanger Med. The expressway's identity marker is "A5".

The Rabat-Tanger motorway originates at an interchange along the Rabat - Safi motorway, surround Rabat as a bypass until the interchange with Rabat–Oujda motorway .The road then continues to the toll station at the Kénitra centre interchange, before continuing north towards the Kénitra north interchange where it passes under the RP2 road. Just north of here lies the Kenitra north toll station. The expressway then follows the coast past the fishing village of Moulay Bouselham. 30 km north of there is the town of Larache where there is an intersection. Another 30 km along the way is the interchange at Sidi El Yamani, connecting to the road to Tetouan and Ceuta. There is another intersection at Asilah, with 40 km remaining to Tangier. The road then crosses the Tahaddart river estuary before reaching its final destination.

== History ==
Construction started in 1993 and in 1995 the first section, between Rabat and Kénitra north, was opened. The road was prolonged to Larache in 1996. In 2000, the section to Sidi El Yamani was opened, with Asilah being connected in 2002. In July 2005, 12 years after the start of construction, the totality of the axis was completed.

The axis technically comprises also the Rabat bypass, although it does not conform with motorway regulations. Before its opening in 1997, getting to the origin of the road was a hard task for traffic coming from Casablanca, as the centre of Rabat had to be crossed.

== Financial ==
In 2007 the toll-revenues for this road totaled 269 million dirhams (2006: 212 MDh), taking 2nd place in list of top earners in Morocco (Figure includes sections Tangier-RN2 and Tétouan - M'diq).

Figures regarding investments for road-construction: (costs per km. in brackets)

- Rabat – Larache: 1800 million Dh – 13 million Dh/km.
- Larache – Sidi El Yamani: 400 million Dh – 15 million Dh/km.
- Sidi El Yamani – Asilah: 440 million Dh – 30 million Dh/km.
- Asilah – Tanger: 1400 million Dh – 47 million Dh/km.
- Total: 4040 million Dh

and also:

- Desserte du port Tanger Med : 3930 million Dh – 73 million Dh/km.
