= Casablanca–Rabat expressway =

Expressway in Morocco

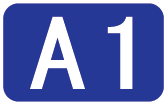
A1 motorway
- الطريق السيار الرباط–الدار البيضاء
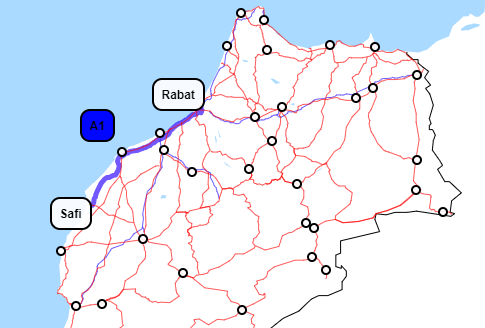

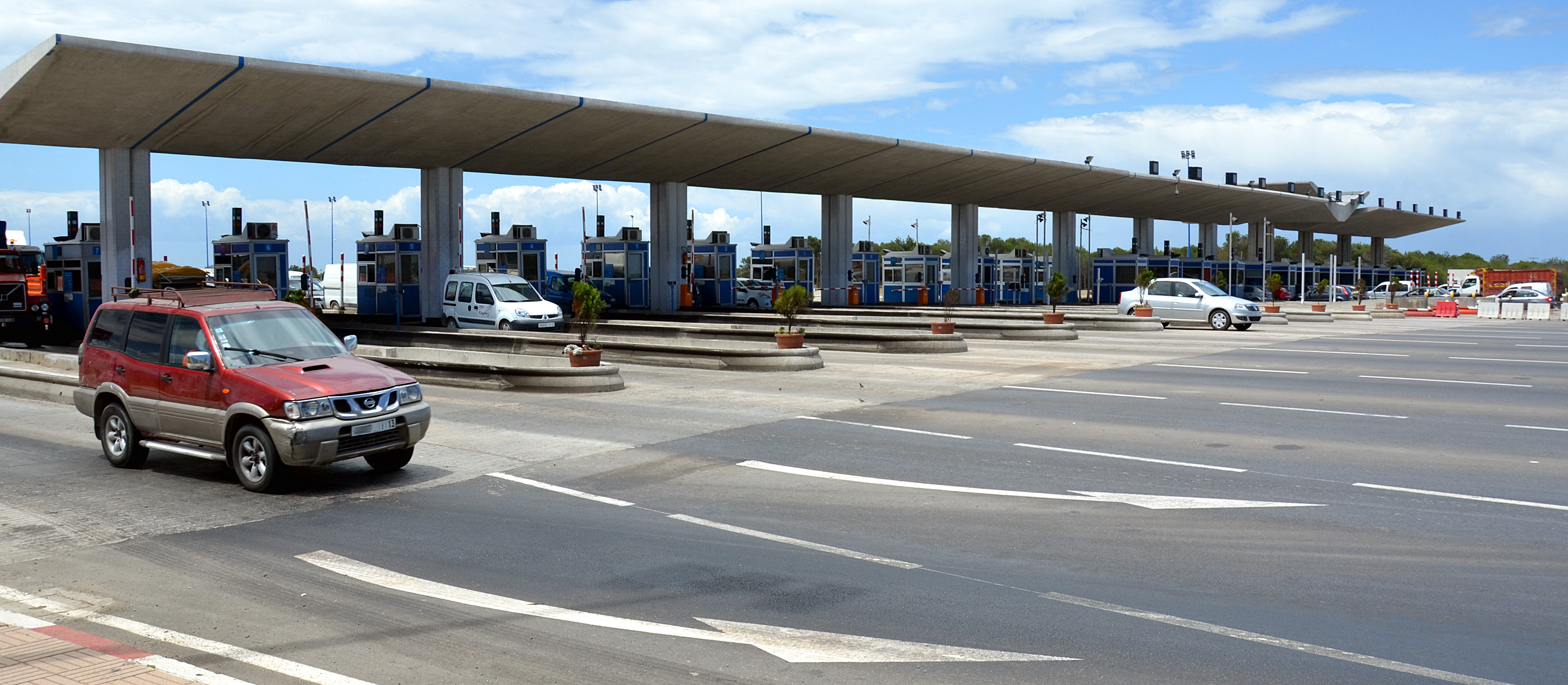

Route information
- Length: 86 km (53 mi)
- Existed: 1975–present
- History: Construction paused for 7 years in 1980s; Completed in 1991

Major junctions
- North end: Rabat Ring Road
- Rabat–Fez expressway Casablanca–Marrakesh expressway
- South end: Casablanca

Location
- Country: Morocco

Highway system
- Transport in Morocco

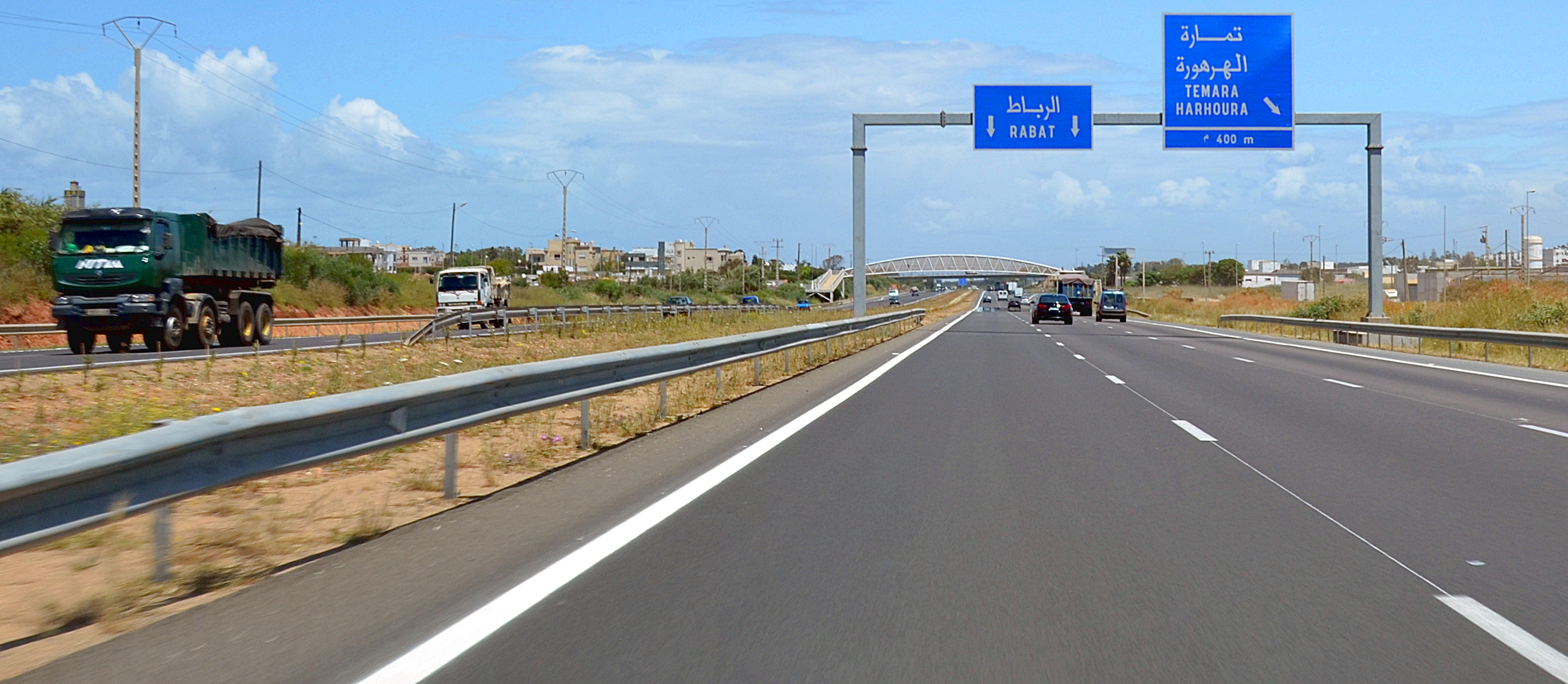

The Casablanca–Rabat expressway, designated A1, was the first expressway to be built in Morocco, with construction starting in the 1970s. It was only completed in 1986 after a 7-year halt.

It was originally free of charge, but a toll station was erected at Bouznika in 1993 as part of a new strategy in Moroccan expressway construction. Traffic between Casablanca and Mohammedia west, as well as from Rabat to Aïn Atiq travel free of charge.

In December 2012 the operator of the road, ADM widened the road to 2 X 3 lanes. Work was started in 2009. Estimated costs for this 58 km long project are 800 Million Dirham. Main reason for expansion is the expected traffic growth, which is calculated at 55-79% between 2010 and 2020, depending on the stretch of road
Toll revenues for the Casablanca–Rabat expressway are the highest in the country, generating 306 million dirhams in 2007 (252 million in 2006), nearly a third of all toll-revenues in Morocco.

The route starts at the centre of Casablanca, and then joins the Casablanca bypass at the junction just before the west Mohammedia interchange. It continues past the east interchange serving Mohammedia before reaching the toll station at Bouznika. After passing Skhirat and Aïn Atiq the road reaches Temara on the outskirts of Rabat. Traffic going to Fez and Tangier then exit at Hay Riad to converge onto the non-expressway Rabat bypass. The motorway regulations end just before the entrance to the city at the Prince Moulay Abdellah sports complex.

In 2016 the Rabat Ring Road was completed and then the road is start/end at this junction.

Originally the motorway regulations also applied to the section west of Aïn Harrouda, through the Casablanca metropolitan area as far as Hay Hassani. These were removed in 1995 an 80 km/h speed limit was imposed on this section.

== See also ==
- Société Nationale des Autoroutes du Maroc
- Moroccan expressways
