= Rabat–Fez expressway =

Expressway in Morocco

A2 motorway

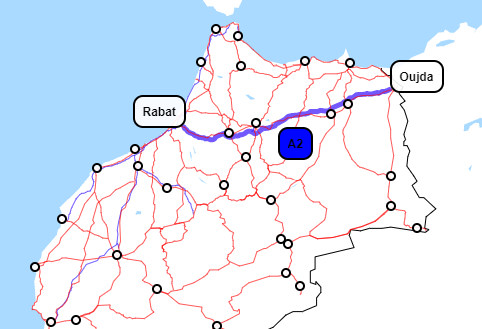

Route information
- Length: 190 km (120 mi)
- Existed: 1998–present
- History: Completed in 1999

Major junctions
- West end: Rabat
- A1, A3, N2
- East end: Fez

Location
- Country: Morocco
- Major cities: Rabat, Khemisset, Meknes, Fez

Highway system
- Transport in Morocco

The Rabat–Fez expressway is an expressway in Morocco; its designated identity marker is A2. Its total length is 190 km.

The Rabat–Fez expressway consists of a four-lane expressway of the non motorway-sort before the toll station at Sidi Allal El Bahraoui. It takes its origin at the interchange with the Rabat–Tangier expressway. After the toll station, motorway regulations apply. The road roughly follows the old RP1 past Tiflet and to Khémisset, before falling down into the valley of the Oued Sebou. The road makes a bypass past Meknes, serving it with two exits, before reaching the target city of Fez. The road will be extended eastward all the way to Oujda, creating the main east–west cross-country link.

The toll income of this road was 146 million dirham (2006: 117 MDh), ranking 4th in toll-revenues in Morocco

The road was constructed during a total of four years, between 1995 and 1999, and opened in three phases:

- Fez–Meknes (May 1998)
- Meknes–Khémisset (October 1998)
- Khémisset–Rabat (May 1999)

The extension of this road, the Fez-Oujda expressway completes the A2 linking of Rabat to Oujda. It was the first road where the ticket system for payment was implemented along the full stretch of the motorway.
