= Nador =

Town in Oriental, Morocco

Nador ⵏⵏⴰⴹⵓⵕ (Standard Moroccan Tamazight) الناظور (Arabic)
- City
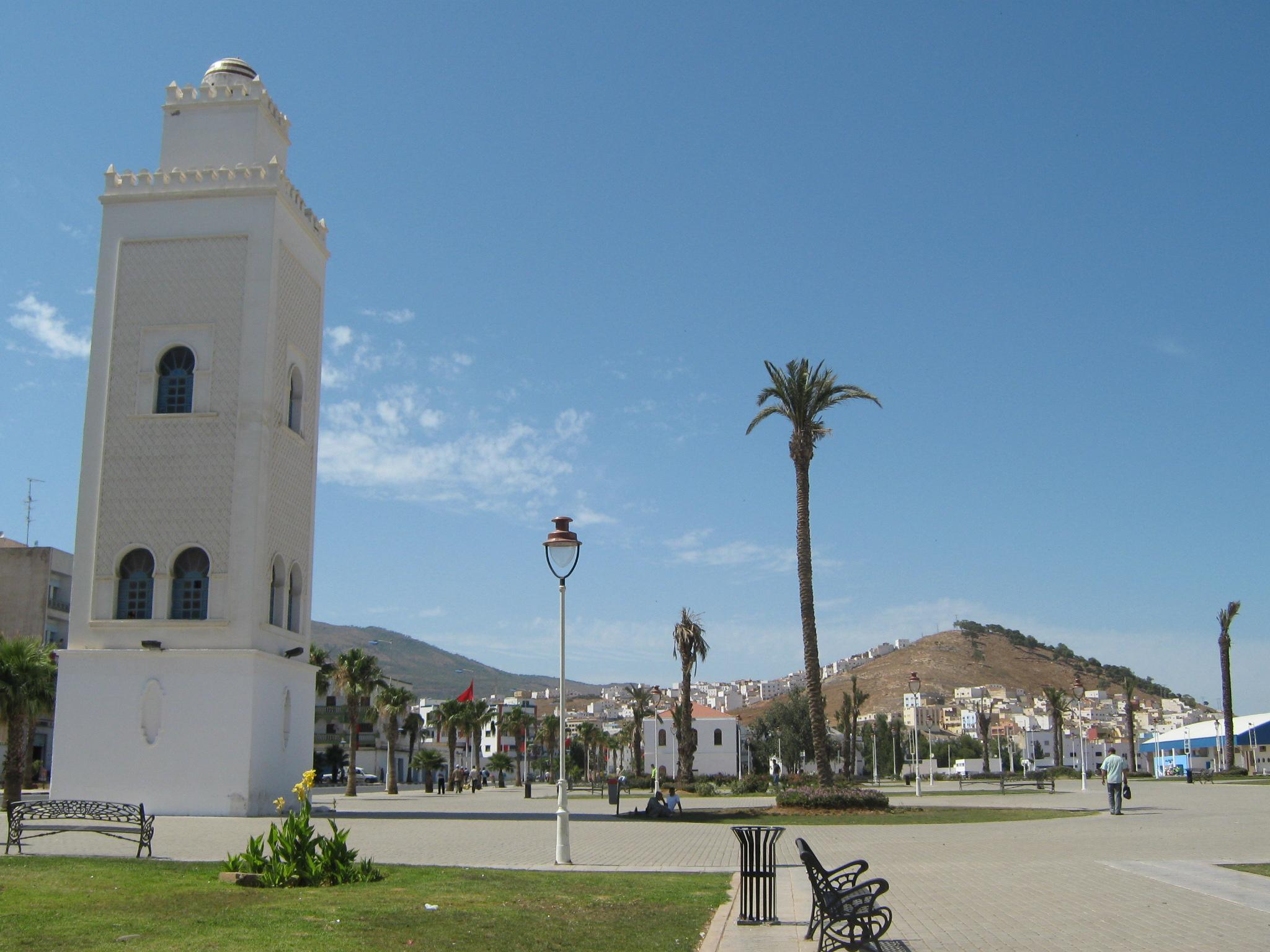
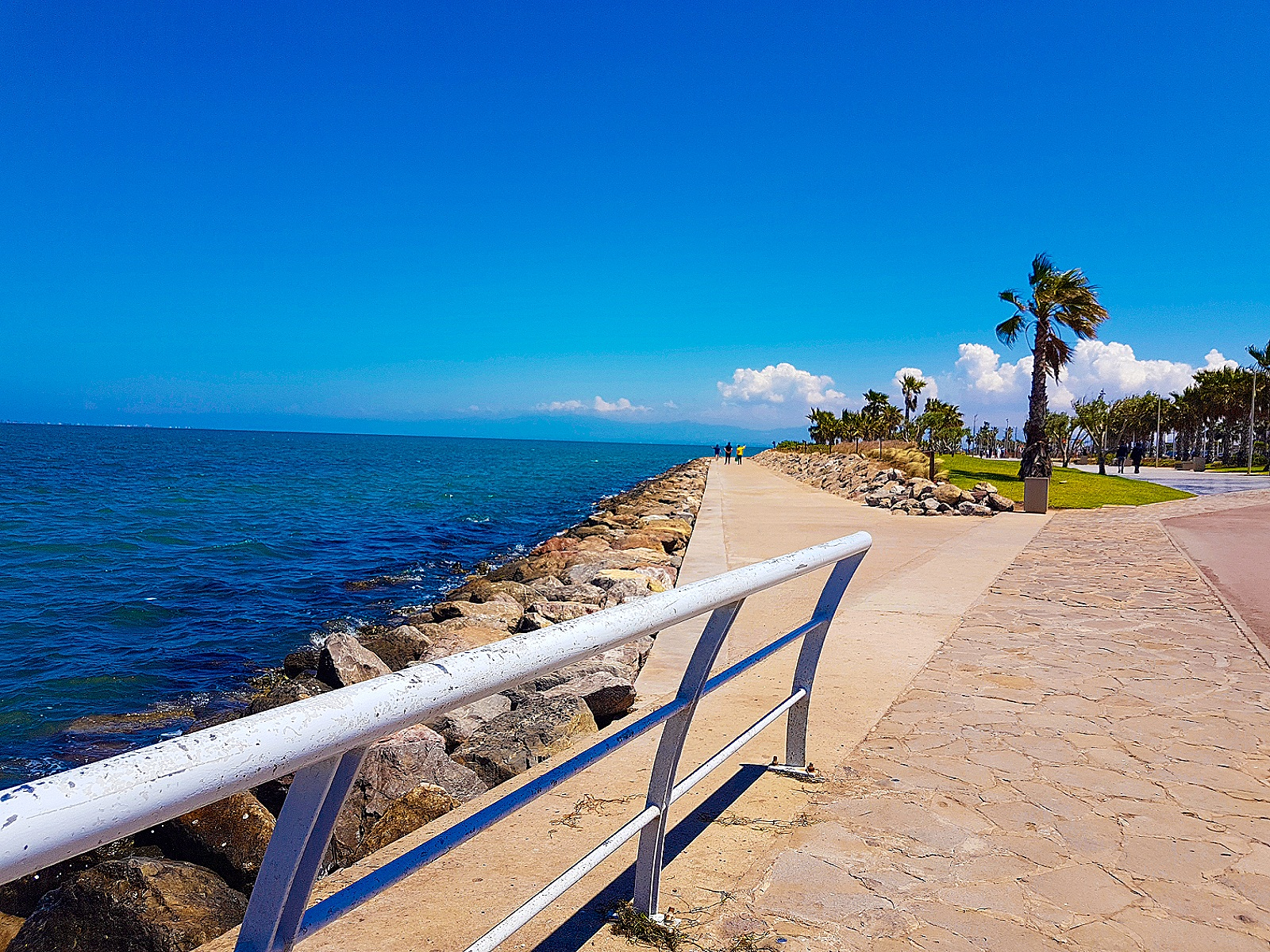
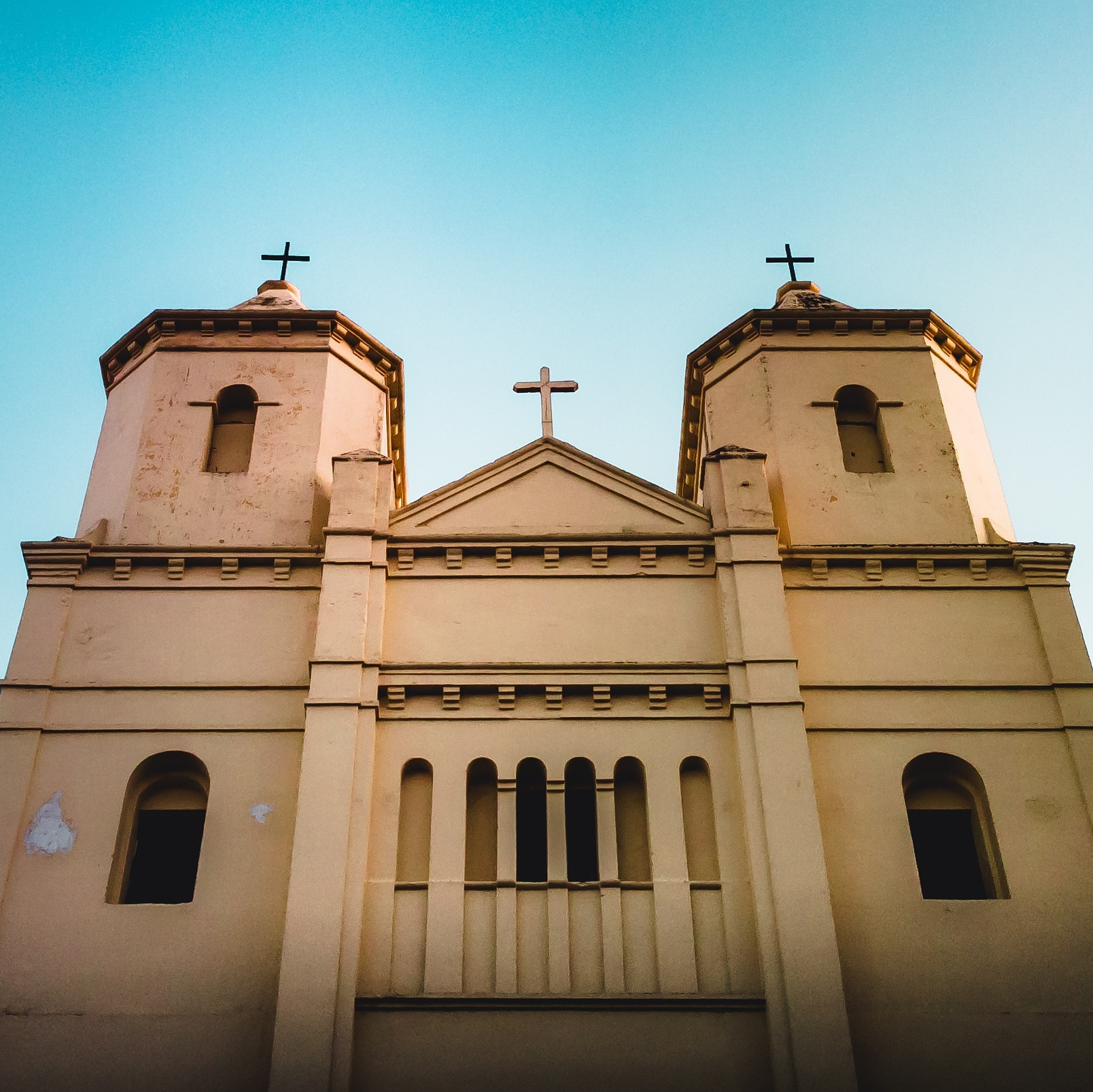
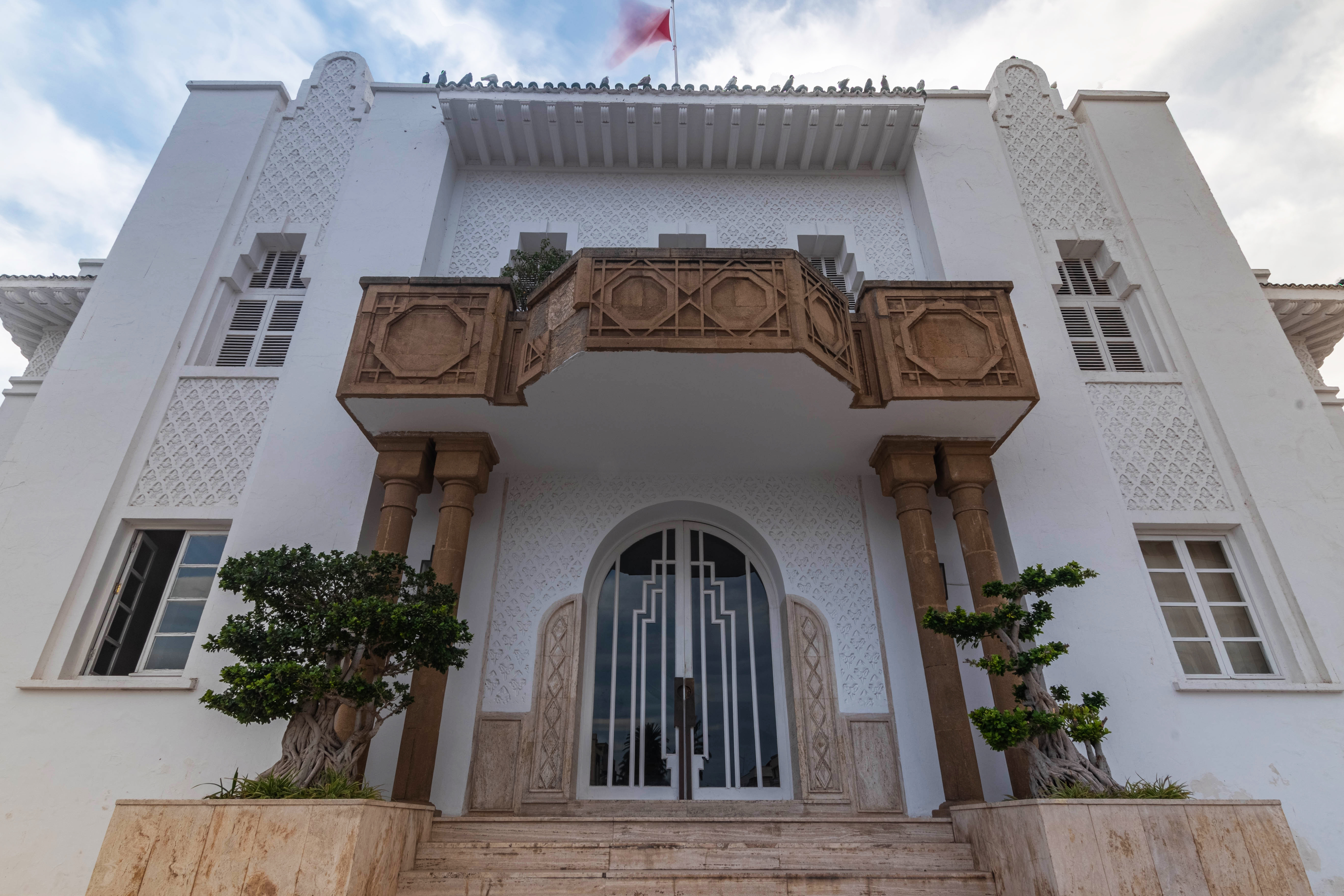
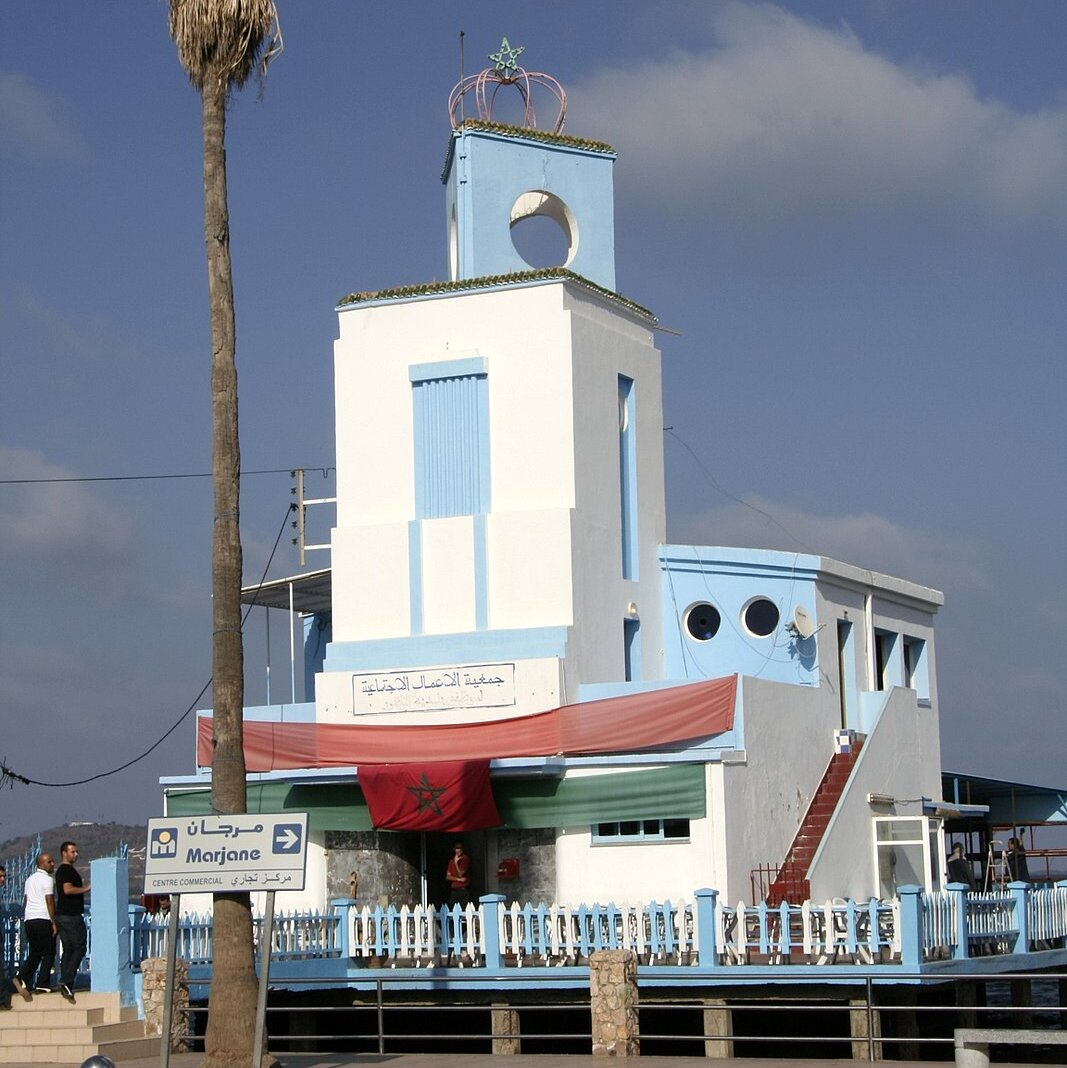
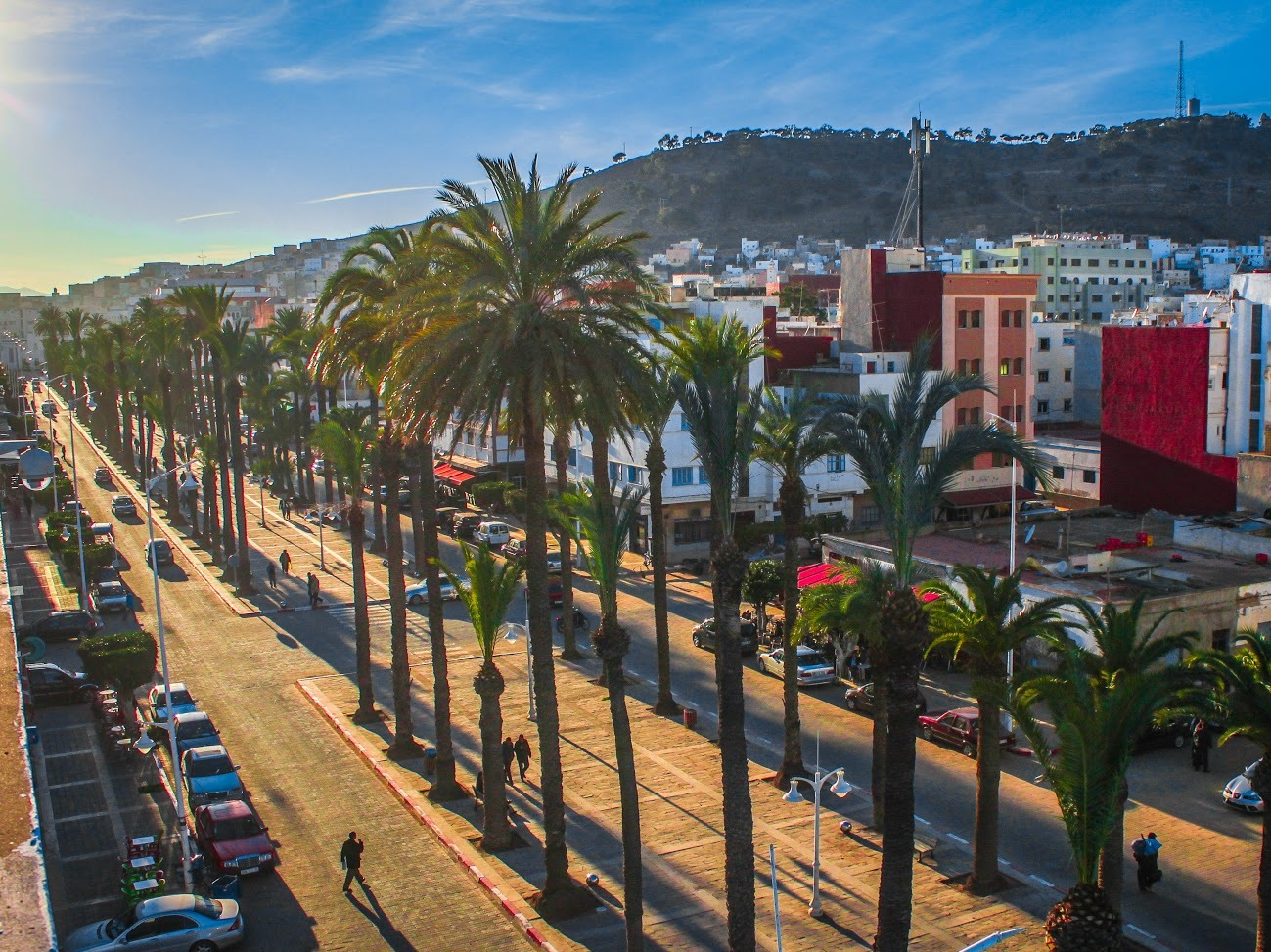
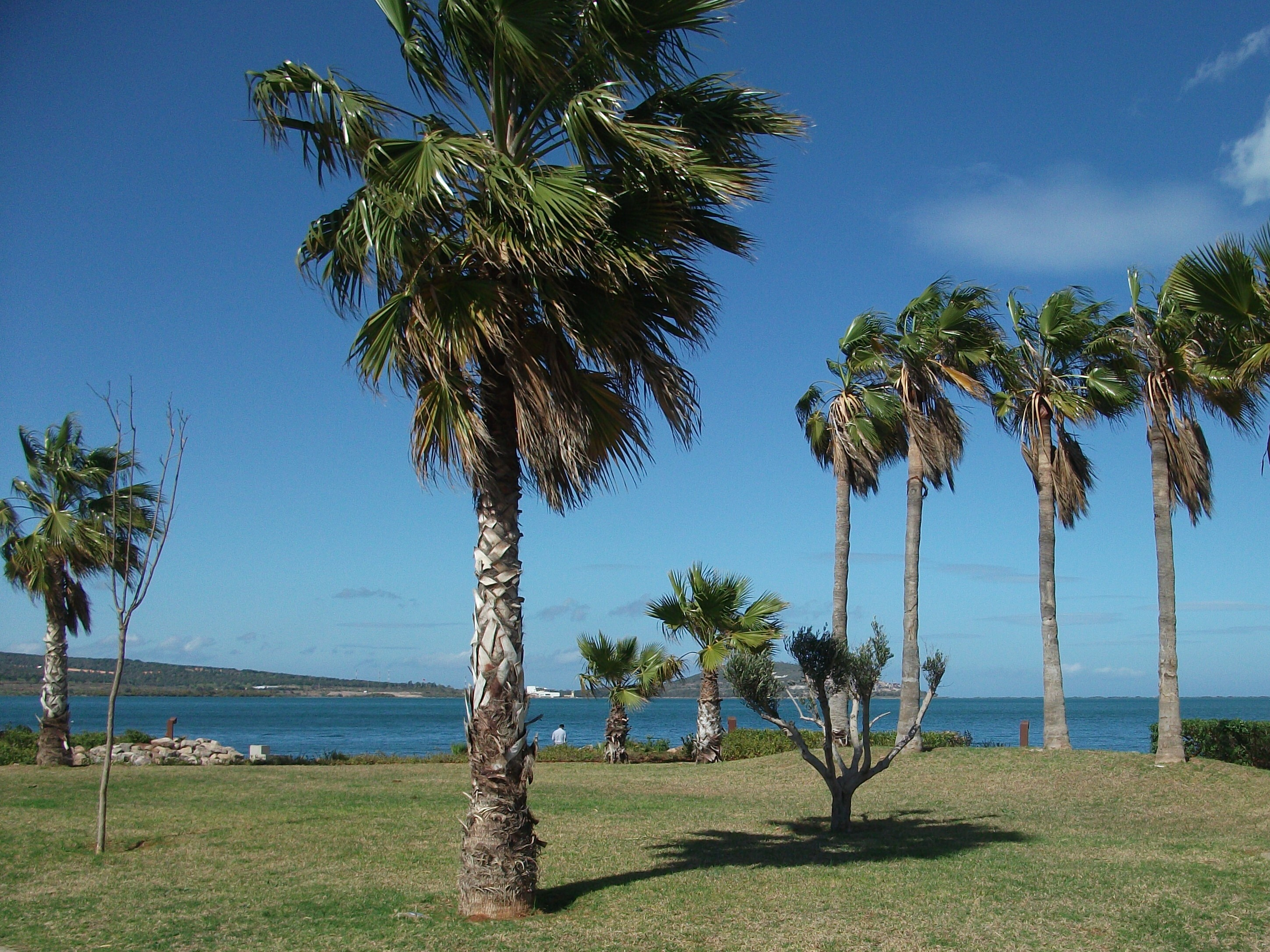
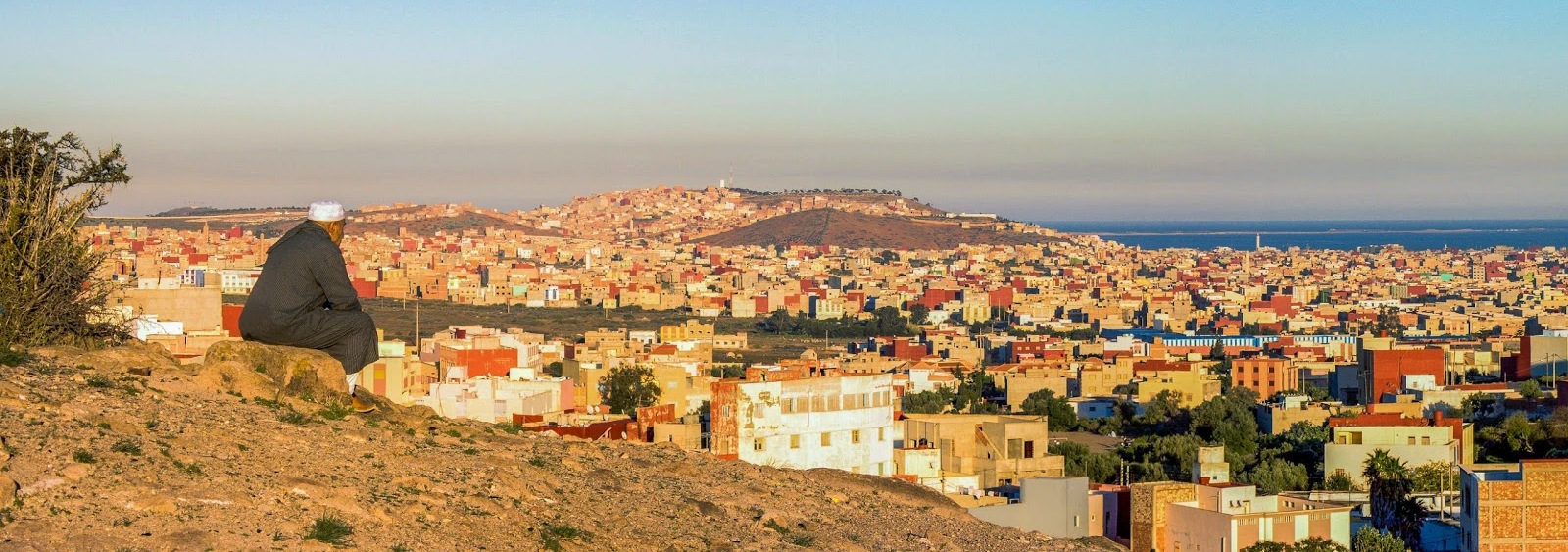
- Interactive map of Nador
- Coordinates: 35°10′0″N 02°56′0″W
- Country: Morocco
- Region: Oriental
- Province: Nador
- Established: 1722

Government
  - Mayor: Soulaimane Azouagh (USFP)

Area
  - Land: 44 km^{2} (17 sq mi)
- Elevation: 0 to 470 m (0 to 1,542 ft)

Population (2024)
  - Total: 158,202
  - Rank: 23rd in Morocco
  - Density: 3,675/km^{2} (9,520/sq mi)
- Time zone: UTC+0 (GMT)
- Postal code: 62000

Nador (Note: Standard Moroccan Tamazight: ⵏⵏⴰⴹⵓⵕ Arabic: الناظور) is a coastal city and provincial capital in the northeastern Rif region of Morocco with a population of about 158,202 (2024 census).

It is the capital of the homonymous Nador Province with more than 500,000 inhabitants and the largest predominantly Riffian city of Morocco.

Nador is considered the second-largest and second-most important city in the Oriental Region after Oujda.

== Overview ==
The economy of Nador and Nador province includes fishery, agriculture, some light and heavy industry.

Every summer, from June to August, thousands of people originating from the Nador area and living in Europe return to the city. The number of these annual visitors may exceed 25,000. They mainly stay with relatives or in rented or owned apartments, rather than staying in Nador's hotels.

Nador city is separated from the Mediterranean Sea by a salt lagoon named Ayřař (Aylal) Ameẓẓyan in Berber (Mar Chica in Spanish) and is 10 kilometres (6.2 mi) south of the Spanish enclave Melilla.

The location of the city on the Mediterranean coast and proximity of the Spanish town Melilla mean there is significant international trade, particularly evident in the widespread sale of Spanish manufactured foodstuffs and household goods in Nador.

== History ==
The area around Nador has been known at least since the 11th century by the name ‘‘Bilād al‑Qulūʿ’’ (Arabic for “Land of the Castles”). From this name, the ethnonym of the local Riffians: Iqelʿiyen (“People of the Castles”) is derived. The City of Nador was founded in the 19th century by local Berber tribes and was under Spanish occupation from 1912 until Morocco's independence in 1956.

The city name originated from the local Berber tribe of Has Nador of the Mazouza, a fraction of the guelaya.

== Demographics ==
Nador has recently become a fast-growing city, despite experiencing a population drop with the departure of the Spanish, when the population decreased from 23,000 in the early 1950s to less than 5,000 in 1960. Nador's population grew by 566% between 1960 and 1971, from 4,806 people in 1960 and 32,000 in 1971. Its population has since grown with over 500% once again, to a total estimated population of 200,000 in 2015. Only eight years previously, in 2007, the city had a population of 120,000. The Amazigh culture is dominant and Nador is the largest Tarifit-speaking city in the world. The population density in the city of Nador is many times that of the larger Nador Province.

== Geography ==
Nador is the 19th largest city in Morocco and is the capital of Nador Province in the Oriental Region of northern Morocco. It is located on the Sebkha Bou Areq lagoon on the Mediterranean coastline. The city sprawls along the coast. It is approximately 75 km (47 mi) west of the Algerian border, 10 km (6.2 mi) south of the Spanish enclave of Melilla, and 380 km (240 mi) east of the Moroccan capital of Rabat. The city center of Nador is largely a grid of streets around the north-south axis of Avenue Hassan II, with the main bus- and taxi stations at its southern end. Avenue Mohammed V runs from the city's waterfront to the city's governmental facilities and town hall on its east end. Mohammed V Boulevard has open plazas and Spanish Iberian-style architecture, particularly seen in the Roman Catholic churches. The administrative city center, main post office, and the Grand Mosque are all located on the Youssef Ben Tachfine Boulevard.

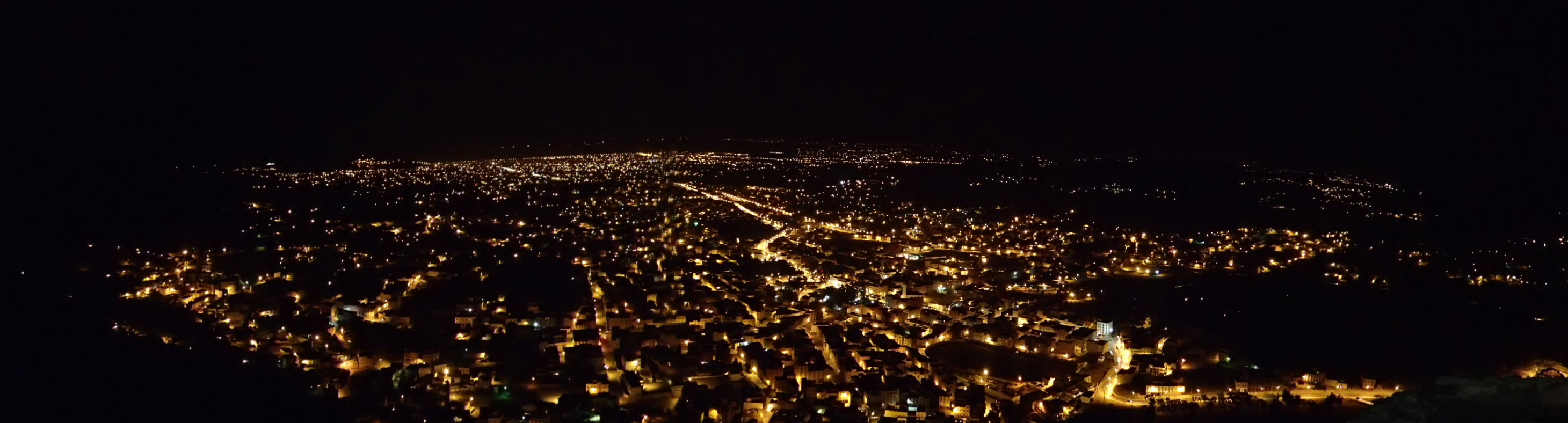
Great Nador by night.

=== Nature ===
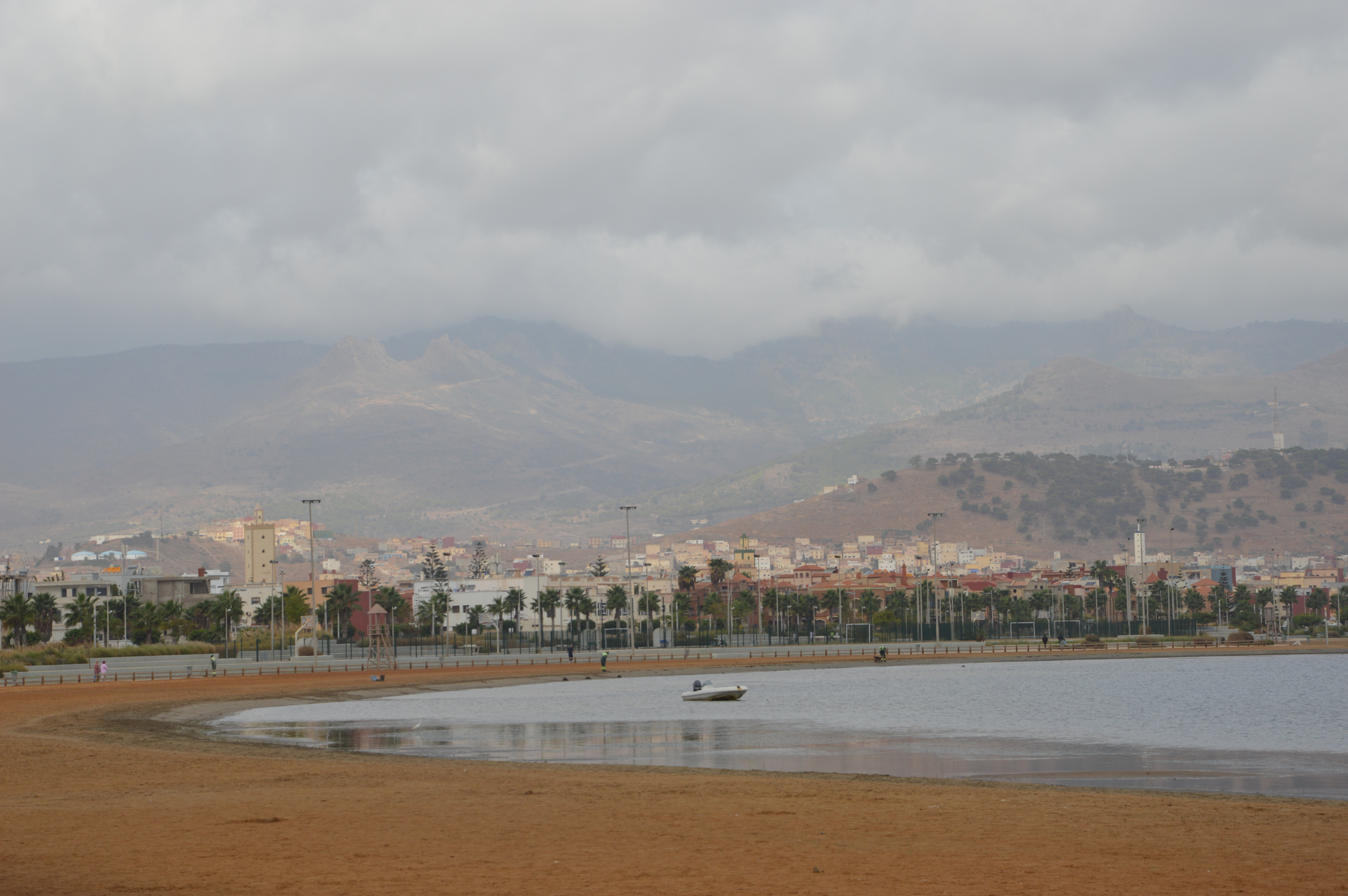
Gourougou mountain seen from Marchica beach

Marchica Lagoon, to the east of the city, attracts wildlife, especially migratory birds The protected wetlands at Oued Moulouya and Kariat Arekman by the Moulouya River mouth are home to greater flamingos, great crested grebes, pied avocets, black-winged stilts, Eurasian coots, dunlins, oystercatchers, Audouin's gulls, grey herons, little egrets, spotted redshanks, black-tailed godwits, common redshanks, kingfishers, black terns, and numerous other species of terns and gulls. As well as being a safe haven for birds, this area is frequently visited by locals because of its natural environment. There are major freshwater and saline sites covering large areas of protected sand dunes, marsh- and swampland. Insects include damselflies, Caelifera, and numerous others. The flora includes marram grass, juniper, Cistus, and more.

=== Climate ===
Nador has a hot semi-arid climate (Köppen climate classification BSh). In winter there is more rainfall than in summer. The average annual temperature in Nador is 18.7 °C (65.7 °F). About 313 mm (12.32 in) of precipitation falls annually.

Climate data for Nador
| Month | Jan | Feb | Mar | Apr | May | Jun | Jul | Aug | Sep | Oct | Nov | Dec | Year |
|---|---|---|---|---|---|---|---|---|---|---|---|---|---|
| Mean daily maximum °C (°F) | 16.6 (61.9) | 17.2 (63.0) | 18.9 (66.0) | 20.8 (69.4) | 23.5 (74.3) | 26.7 (80.1) | 29.6 (85.3) | 30.1 (86.2) | 27.8 (82.0) | 24.6 (76.3) | 20.7 (69.3) | 18.1 (64.6) | 22.9 (73.2) |
| Mean daily minimum °C (°F) | 8.4 (47.1) | 8.9 (48.0) | 10.7 (51.3) | 12.4 (54.3) | 15.0 (59.0) | 18.0 (64.4) | 20.7 (69.3) | 21.8 (71.2) | 19.5 (67.1) | 16.2 (61.2) | 12.4 (54.3) | 10.0 (50.0) | 14.5 (58.1) |
| Average precipitation mm (inches) | 52 (2.0) | 37 (1.5) | 33 (1.3) | 38 (1.5) | 21 (0.8) | 7 (0.3) | 1 (0.0) | 3 (0.1) | 16 (0.6) | 24 (0.9) | 33 (1.3) | 48 (1.9) | 313 (12.3) |
Source: Climate-Data.org, Climate data

=== Neighborhoods ===
Main Nador city quarters and neighbourhoods include:

- Teraqqa'a (حي ترقاع)
- El Khettabi (الخطابي)
- El Kindy (الكندي)
- Laarasi (Laɛraṣi)
- Anafag / Elmatar / New Nador / Ennaḍur Amaynu (الناظور الجديد)
- Laari Shikh (Laɛri n Eccix)
- Ammas n Temdint / Centro / Centre ville (Downtown Nador)

Downtown Nador: a relatively developed area in comparison with the rest of the city. This lies in the centre of the city and was partially developed during the Spanish occupation of northern Morocco.

- Ulad Mimun (Ayt Mimun)
- Isebbanen
- Ichumay (Icumay)
- Aarrid (Ɛarriḍ)
- Ulad Barhim
- Tireqqaâ / Tireqqaɛ
- Ayt Leḥsen
- Erfid / Ibarraqen

== Nador transmitter ==
Near Nador is the transmission site for long- and short-wave Medi 1 Radio which broadcasts to all Maghreb countries. The aerial masts of Medi 1 Radio for long-wave are approximately 380 m (1,250 ft) high and are among the tallest human-made structures in Africa.

== Transport ==
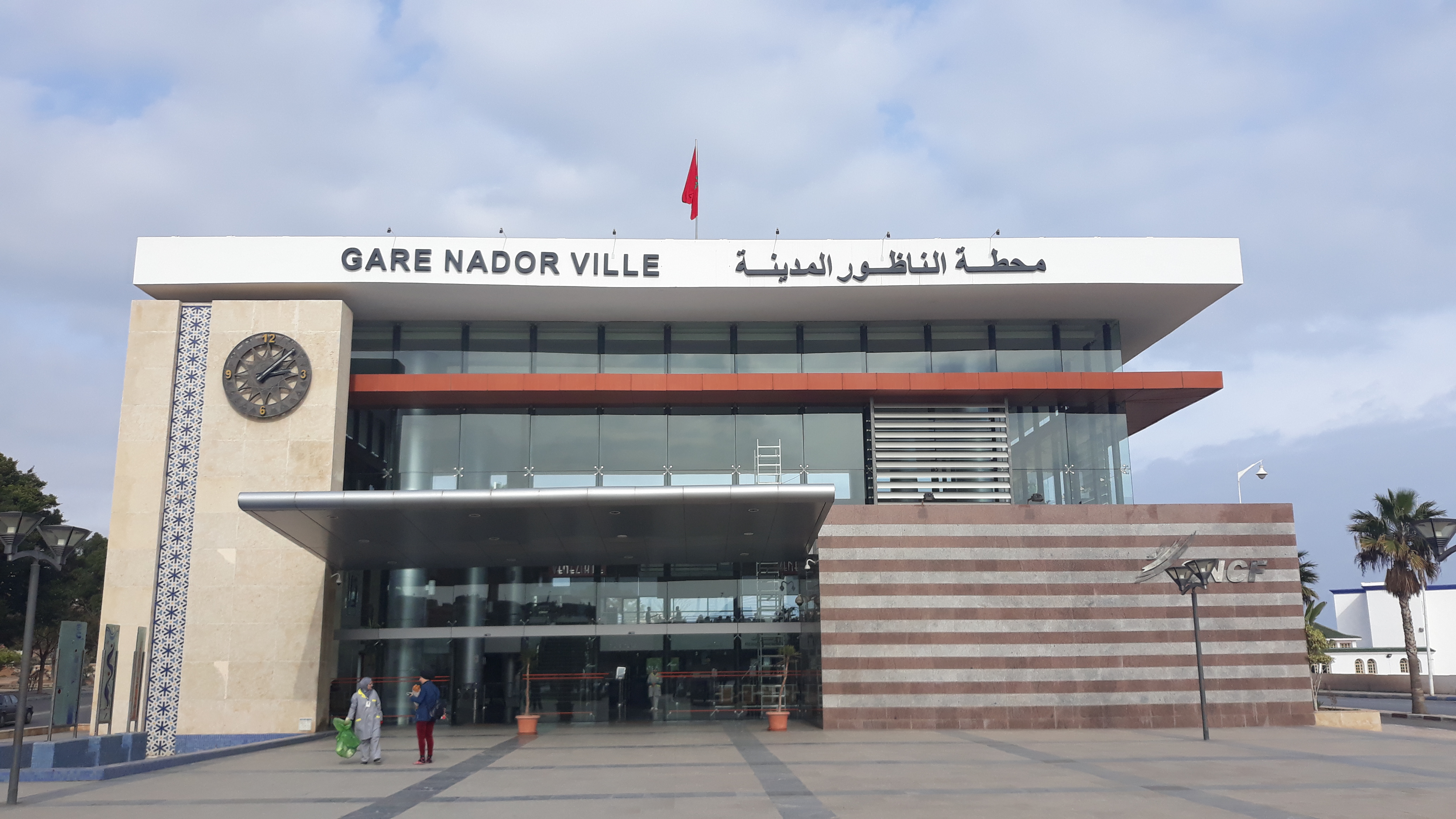
Nador Ville railway station main entrance

A railway linking Nador to Taourirt was opened on 2 July 2009 by king Mohammed VI of Morocco. as part of ONCF's rail projects. Previously, there was a connecting bus link from Taourirt, also operated by railway company ONCF.

In addition, several direct bus links operate between Nador and major Moroccan cities. Daily ferry services link Nador Port with Almeria in Spain and a weekly service to Sète in France.

Nador International Airport offers direct flights to Moroccan and European destinations, such as cities in France and Germany, and acts as a second airport for travellers to and from Melilla.

Roads connect to the Fes-Oujda expressway and to nearby Melilla.

== Economy ==
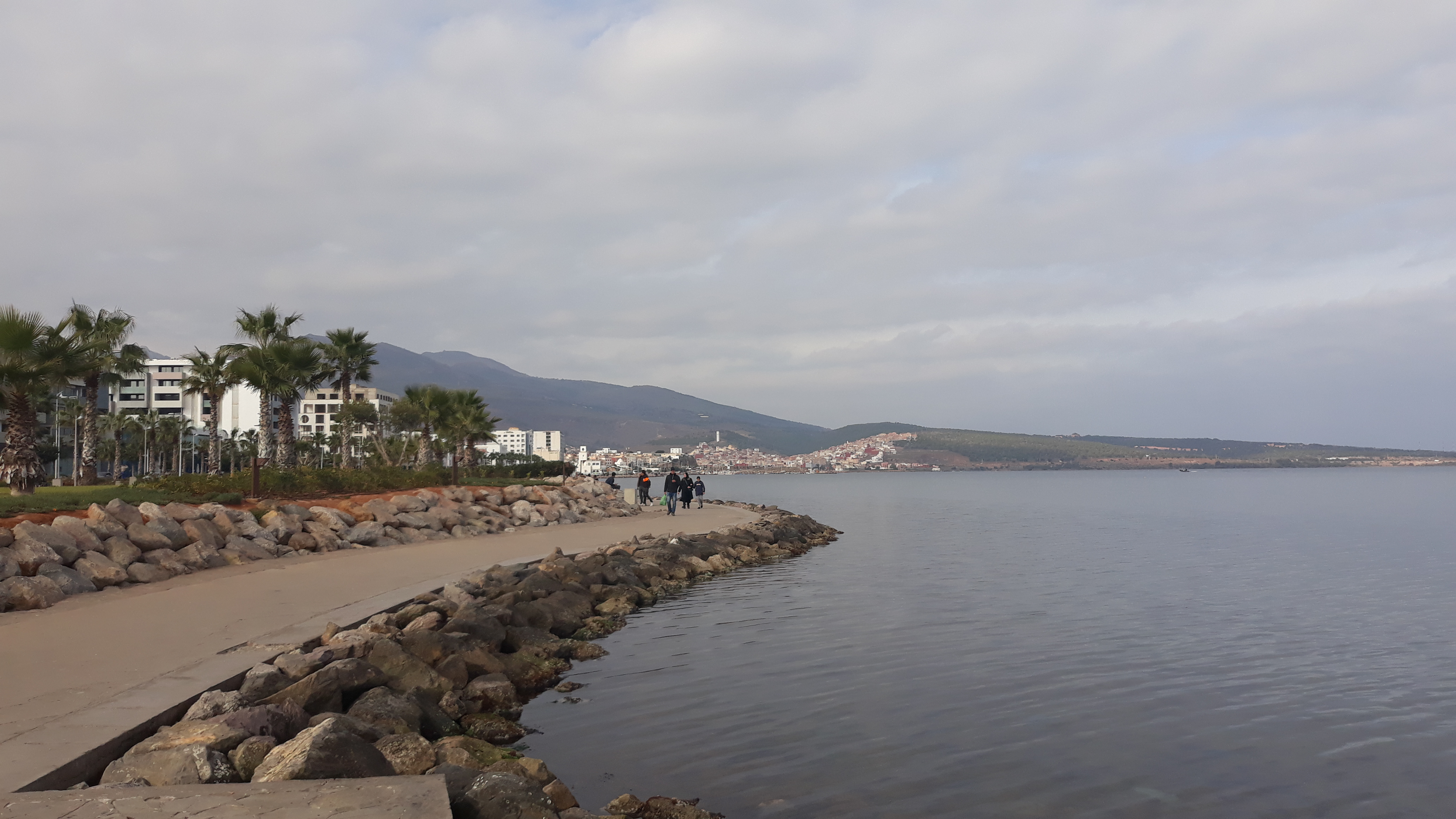
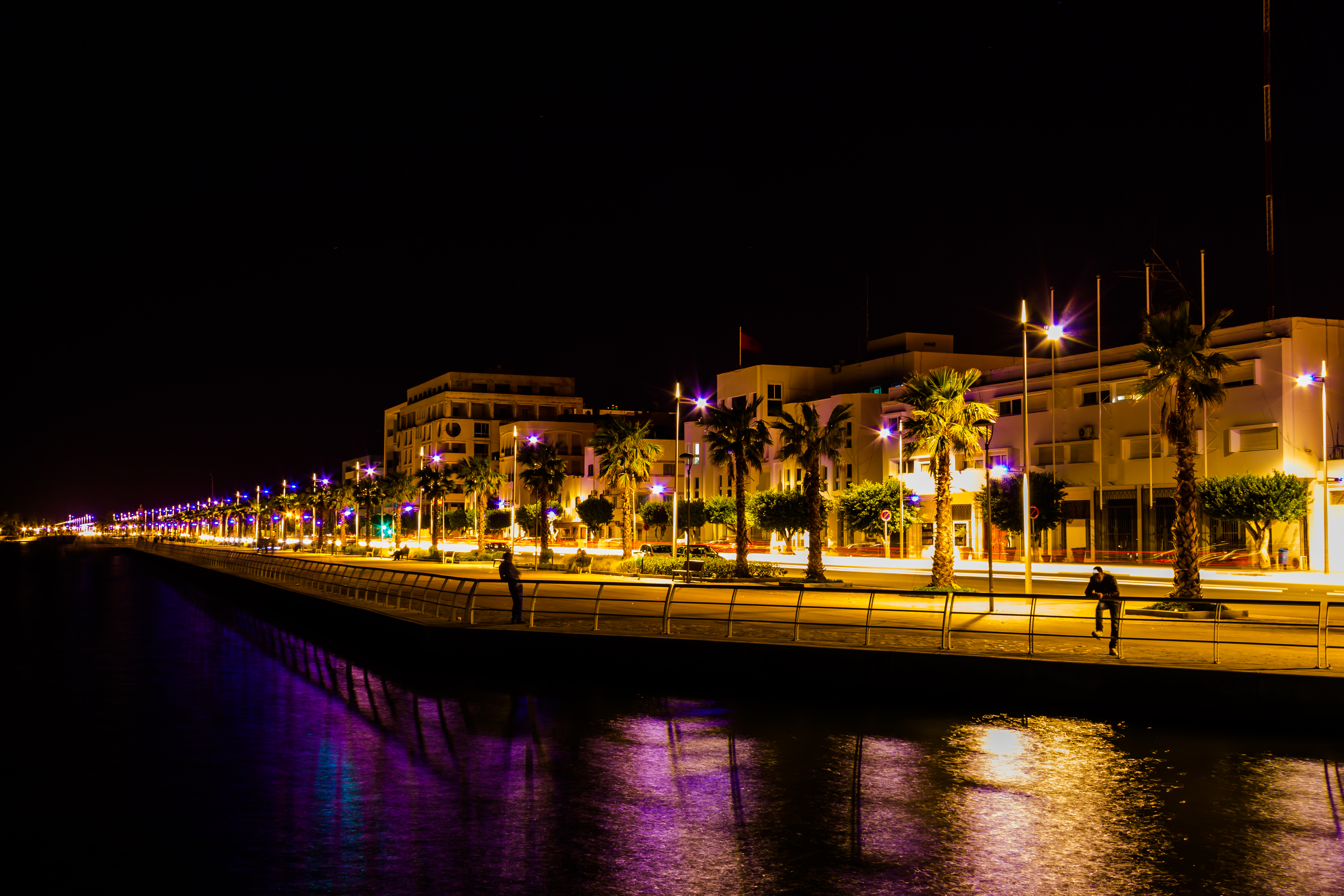
The corniche

The main two economic industries here are fishing and agriculture. Other types of industrial income are generated from textiles, chemicals, and numerous metallurgical industries. Recently, tourism has also become an important factor for the economy.

Most tourists come from other Moroccan cities, but Nador has also an increasing number of European visitors, some through the international ferry connections to Spain and France. Nador International Airport, in which opened in 1999, also serves numerous European cities, including flights to Amsterdam, Brussels, Frankfurt, Marseille, and Barcelona. The two Nador railway stations connect to the rail network of the country of Morocco. The recent boost in tourism here has inspired ambitious tourism plans for the area, endorsed by King Mohammed VI. With its avenues, palm-lined boulevards and brand new marina, hotels, cafés, banks, shops and restaurants press on to make it suitable for the fast-growing tourism industry.

Nador has experienced a dramatic economic growth in recent years, fueled by traditional industries, such as metallurgy, and by modern ones, i.e. electronics, chemicals, and textiles. Older industries as fishing and agriculture are still the most important income for Nadoris. Beni Enzar, on the edge of Nador, is home to Nador Port, which is one of the most crucial fishing ports on the Mediterranean coast. Nador Port also has modern naval dockyards. Nador's farm land is extremely fertile, and the main agricultural resources are fruits, citrus, and wine-grapes.

=== Tourism ===
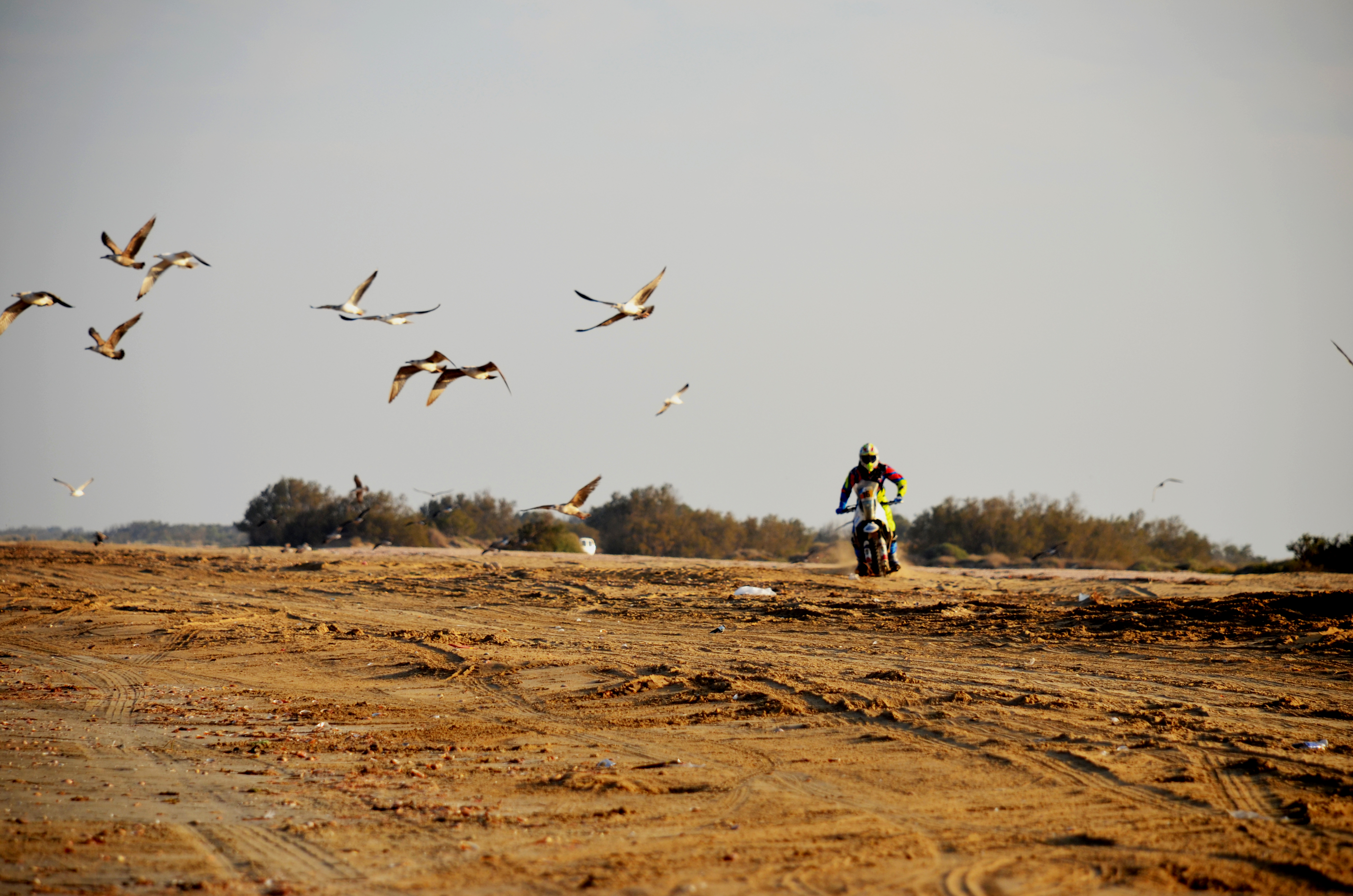
Motocross on the beach

During the summer months, Nador is visited by tens of thousands of Moroccan migrants living in Europe, who are originally from the province or from the city of Nador itself. These summer visitors contribute strongly to the development of the city.

Until early 2008 the city end of the boulevard was formed by the Rif Hotel, but in the spring of 2008 the existing hotel was demolished and the road alongside the boulevard opened and extended. This new road by-passes the city centre and runs directly towards the main roundabout at the entrance of Nador via the road to Tawima. The remaining grounds where the hotel and its facilities were located are being redeveloped into a new hotel complex: after some delay the new development is being built under supervision of Khalid El Adouli. The new Rif complex is being built on the grounds of the former hotel minus the strip of land directly on the coast, as this is now a road and a public boulevard on reclaimed land.

The new hotel will target the high-end tourism market and also cater for business users with congress-facilities. Once re-opened it will offer a discothèque (serving alcoholic beverages) and meeting or party rooms. The hotel itself will offer 110 four-star rooms, including ten suites and also 76 apartment rooms. The budget for the redevelopment of the hotel is 356 million dirham and the total usable floorspace will be 30,000 m^{2} (320,000 sq ft).

Just outside Nador a new ecological resort, Abdouna Trifa, is being developed, including holiday homes, a golf course and a marina. The total size of the new resort consists of 720,000 m^{2} (180 acres) built area on a terrain of 480 ha (1,200 acres). This ten-year development plan was started in 2008 by Mohammed VI, the king of Morocco. Both this project as well as the new RIF Hotel are being developed by Compagnie Générale Immobiliere (CGI), part of the CDG Group. When completed, the resort will consist of approx. 1700 "villas", 1300 apartments, a four-star and a five-star hotel. The development also includes a 27-hole golf-track and several other tourist facilities.

== Notable people ==
- Achraf Ouchen - Karateka
- Ahmed Aboutaleb - Politician
- Elwalid Mimoun - Artist
- Faissal Ebnoutalib - Olympic Taekwondo athlete
- Jamal Benomar - Diplomat, Human rights activist
- Khalid Izri - Artist
- Najat Vallaud-Belkacem - Politician
- Najib Amhali - Comedian, Actor
- Namika - Musician
- Mohammed Benzakour, Writer.
