= Autoroutes du Maroc =

Moroccan state-owned motorway operator

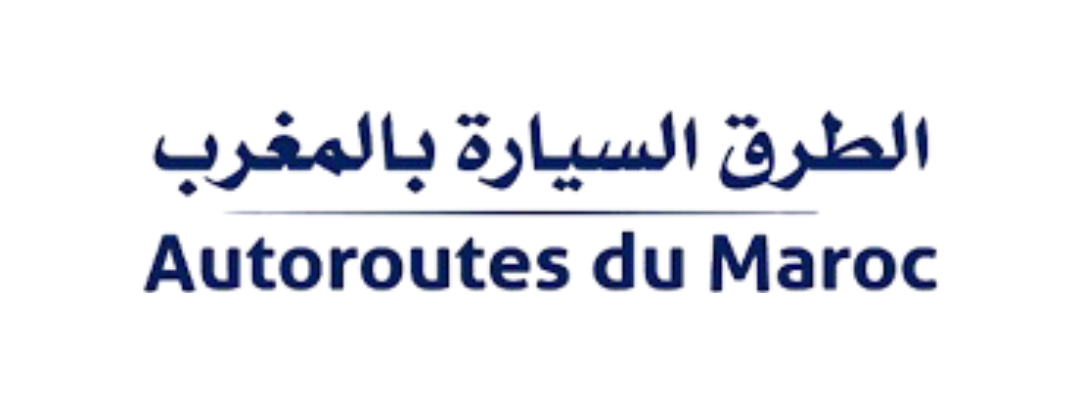

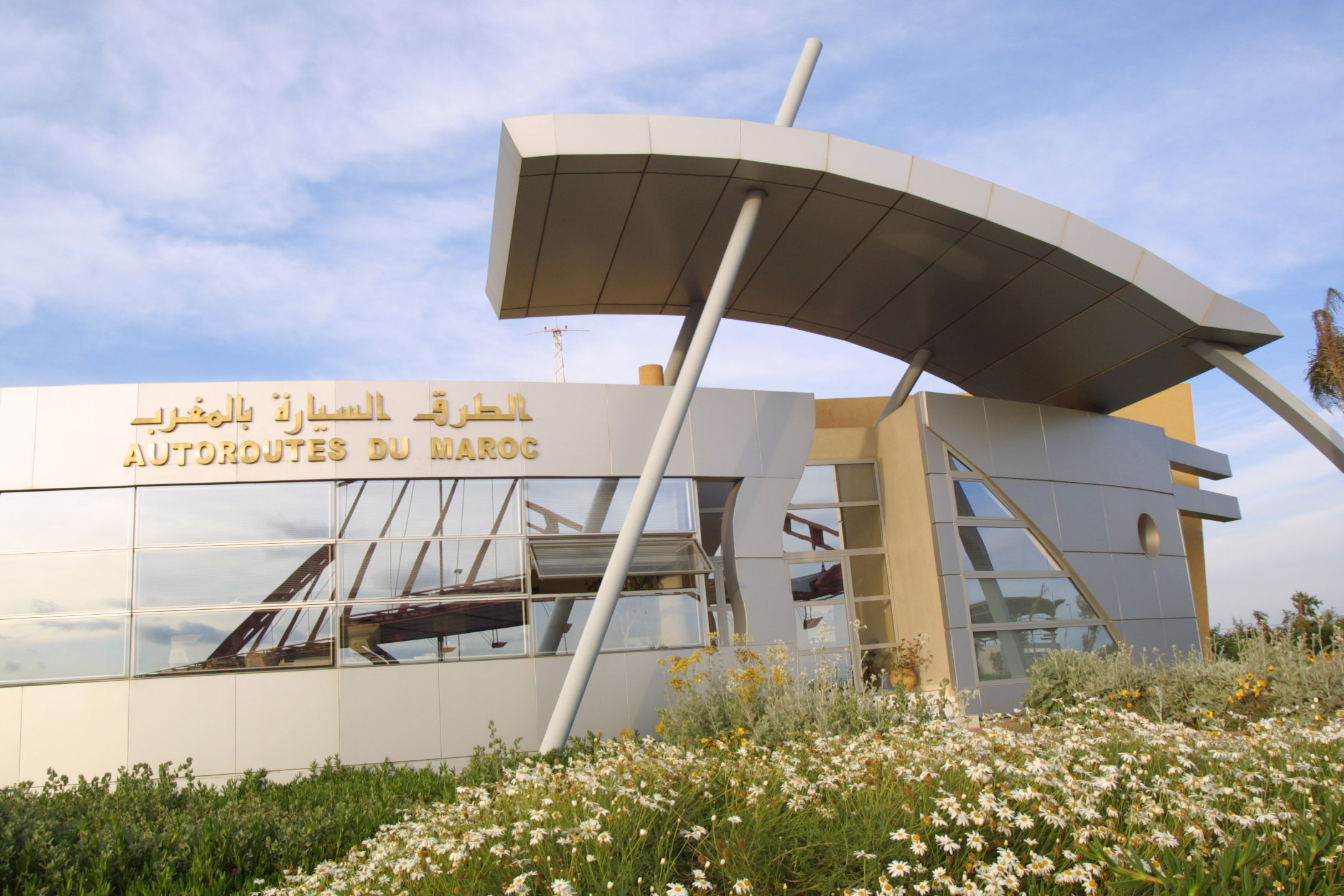
- Board of directors HQ
- Native name: الطرق السيارة بالمغرب
- Industry: Motorway infrastructure and operations
- Founded: 1989; 37 years ago
- Headquarters: Rabat, Morocco
- Area served: Morocco
- Key people: Mohammed Cherkaoui Eddeqaqi (Director General)
- Website: www.adm.co.ma

Autoroutes du Maroc (ADM; English: Motorways of Morocco) is Morocco’s state-owned motorway concessionaire responsible for the construction, operation and maintenance of the national toll motorway network. The company is headquartered in Rabat and operates the motorway system on behalf of the Moroccan state.

The development of the motorway network has been identified by international institutions as a central component of Morocco’s transport and logistics infrastructure, supporting intercity mobility, freight transport and regional integration.

As of 2025, the motorway network operated by ADM extends to approximately 1,800 kilometres, making it the second-largest motorway network in Africa.

== History ==
Morocco’s modern motorway programme began with the Casablanca–Rabat motorway, constructed in stages from the mid-1970s and completed in the late 1980s. ADM was established in 1989 to centralise motorway development and operation under a concession model based primarily on toll revenues and long-term borrowing.

From the 1990s onward, the motorway network expanded significantly, linking major urban centres, ports and border regions. This expansion formed part of broader national infrastructure strategies aimed at improving connectivity and supporting economic growth.

== Role and activities ==
ADM’s responsibilities include:

- construction of motorway sections under concession from the Moroccan state;
- operation and maintenance of the toll motorway network;
- management of tolling systems and customer services; and
- provision of motorway user services, including traffic information, roadside assistance and rest areas.

== Motorway network ==
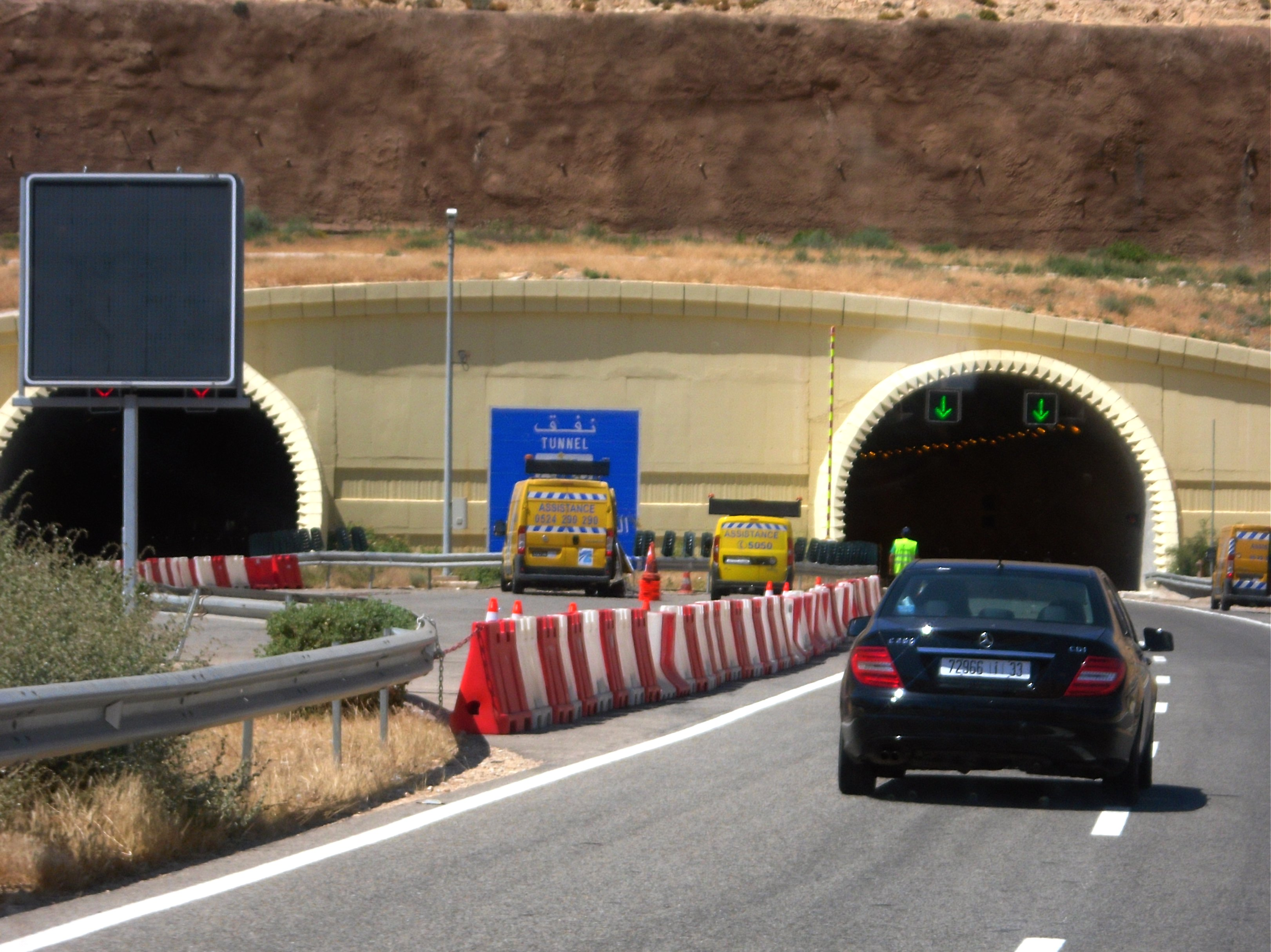
Road tunnel on the A3 motorway near Agadir, Morocco

The national motorway network connects Morocco’s principal cities, ports and logistics hubs, particularly along the Atlantic corridor between Tangier, Rabat and Casablanca, as well as links toward the interior and southern regions. International transport assessments describe the network as a backbone of Morocco’s road transport system, complementing rail and port infrastructure.

=== Tolling ===
Motorways are operated on a pay-per-use basis through toll plazas and electronic toll collection systems. ADM operates an electronic toll pass known as Jawaz, allowing vehicles to use dedicated lanes with reduced stopping times.

== Traffic and operations ==
Traffic volumes on the motorway network have increased steadily since the 2000s, reflecting rising vehicle ownership, intercity travel and freight activity. Studies note particularly high traffic levels around major metropolitan areas, especially Greater Casablanca, where congestion has led to widening projects and interchange upgrades.

Operational activities include routine and major maintenance, traffic monitoring and coordination with emergency services. These functions represent a significant share of ADM’s operating expenditure.

== Governance ==
ADM is governed by a board of directors and managed by an executive committee. As of 2025, the Director General is Mohammed Cherkaoui Eddeqaqi.

ADM operates under concession agreements and regulatory oversight by the Moroccan state, including approval of toll tariffs and major investment programmes.

== Finance ==
The expansion of the motorway network has been financed primarily through long-term borrowing backed by toll revenues, supplemented by loans from international financial institutions.

== See also ==
- Transport in Morocco
- Toll road
- Road pricing
